= The Killing season 2 =

American crime drama

The Killing
- Season 2
- Season 2 promotional poster
- No. of episodes: 13

Release
- Original network: AMC
- Original release: April 1 – June 17, 2012

Season chronology
- ← Previous; Season 1 Next → Season 3

The second season of the AMC American crime drama television series The Killing premiered on April 1, 2012, concluded on June 17, 2012, and consisted of 13 episodes. The series was developed and produced by Veena Sud and based on the Danish series, Forbrydelsen (The Crime). Set in Seattle, Washington, this season follows the continued investigation into the murder of local teenager Rosie Larsen, with each episode covering approximately 24 hours. The season culminated in the closing of the Larsen murder, with the discovery of those involved with the murder.

== Plot ==
Sarah Linden begins the season not trusting Stephen Holder, as she believes he has produced false evidence against Darren Richmond. She again puts her move to California on hold to prove Richmond's innocence. While avoiding Holder, she uncovers the truth about Richmond's location the night of Rosie Larsen's murder. That night, Richmond attempted to drown himself due to lingering grief over his wife's death; a fisherman who pulled him out of the water confirmed his story. Meanwhile, Holder learns he was a pawn in a bigger conspiracy, and his recent promotion to homicide detective had nothing to do with his police merits. The detectives reunite to resume the murder investigation, and trust and rely only on each other. Their focus turns to the casino after Sarah discovers Rosie had worked and spent time there before her death. Sarah gains access to a locked upper floor of the casino that is under construction. There, she finds an access card belonging to someone at City Hall.

Darren Richmond recovers from an attempted assassination. He learns he is now a paraplegic and ponders his political future. Campaign manager Jamie Wright stays by Richmond's side during his recovery, while Richmond's girlfriend and assistant Gwen Eaton has dealt with personal guilt for contributing information that led to Darren's arrest, subsequent shooting, and the discovery that he has been unfaithful. She left Seattle for Washington, D.C. to work for a senator friend of her father's but returned to help Darren distance himself from the murder suspicion. Jamie also steels Darren's campaign resolve by suggesting the current mayor might be behind the false arrest. Darren returns to the campaign race.

Stan Larsen copes with raising his sons Tom and Denny alone, while his wife Mitch has taken time away from the family. Her sister Terry goes through some financial difficulty and, since she has helped tremendously with taking care of the boys since Rosie's death, Stan allows her to stay with them. Terry, in the meantime, tries to save her relationship with married Seattle businessman Michael Ames. He eventually spurns her, vowing not to leave his wife. Mitch returns home after learning Rosie had discovered Stan was not her biological father and had visited the actual one. The man told Mitch that Rosie had spoken of leaving home.

All three storylines merge when the detectives trace the access card, not to the mayor's office, but to Richmond's main office. Two people become prime suspects: Gwen, who had used the campaign car the night of the murder and had lost her access card, and Jamie, who has had dealings with Michael Ames, an apparent supporter of the current mayor. Richmond learns that Jamie has a secret about the night of the murder and questions him about it, while the detectives and Gwen realize the two are missing on election night. They track them to Darren's office, where Jamie has admitted to Darren that, on the night of the murder, Rosie had witnessed a covert meeting between him, Ames, and casino owner Nicole Jackson. The meeting was about an attempt to ruin the current mayor's campaign and seal a Richmond victory. Rosie had accidentally overheard the discussion and was discovered by Jamie, who knocked her out and eventually took her to the lake in the campaign car. He lacked the courage to drive the car into the water and had called Ames to the scene. Ames had planned to leave town with Terry at the time and, instead, Terry drove him to meet Jamie. While Jamie and Ames argued about completing the task of silencing the witness, Terry overheard Ames say he was not going to participate in a murder even if it meant he could not start his own company and leave his wife. During the argument, Terry went to the idling campaign car and shifted it into gear, causing it to go into the lake. Screams could be heard from the trunk of the car.

The detectives learn of Terry's involvement after realizing that her car was the one seen dropping Ames off at home after the fact. They question her in the Larsen house with Rosie's parents present. She breaks down and confesses that she did not know it was Rosie whom Jamie had locked in the trunk of that car.

The season ends with Terry being arrested, the Larsens moving to a new house after viewing a video of Rosie happily preparing to leave town, new-Mayor Richmond accepting the support of Ames and Jackson, and the detectives getting a call about a new case, with which Sarah decides not to help.

== Crew ==
Series developer Veena Sud also served as executive producer and showrunner of the second season, she wrote two episodes, the season premiere and co-writing the season finale. The rest of the writing staff consisted of co-executive producers Dawn Prestwich and Nicole Yorkin, who co-wrote two episodes together; co-executive producer Aaron Zelman, who wrote two episodes; producer Jeremy Doner, who wrote two episodes; and story editor Wendy Riss, who wrote two episodes. The rest of the episodes were written by freelance writers: Eliza Clark, who wrote two episodes, and Nathaniel Halpern, who wrote a single episode. Kristen Campo served as producer, while Mikkel Bondesen, along with producers from the original Danish series, Søren Sveistrup, Piv Bernth, and Ingolf Gabold were executive producers.

Phil Abraham, Ed Bianchi, and Nicole Kassell, each directed two episodes for season. The rest of the episodes were directed by Agnieszka Holland, Dan Attias, Brad Anderson, Kevin Bray, Keith Gordon, series developer Veena Sud, and "Pilot" director Patty Jenkins, who directed the final episode of the season.

== Cast ==
=== Main ===
- Mireille Enos as Sarah Linden, the lead homicide detective
- Billy Campbell as Darren Richmond, politician running for mayor of Seattle
- Joel Kinnaman as Stephen Holder, Sarah's homicide detective partner
- Michelle Forbes as Mitch Larsen, Rosie's mother
- Brent Sexton as Stanley Larsen, Rosie's father
- Kristin Lehman as Gwen Eaton, Darren's lover and his campaign adviser
- Eric Ladin as Jamie Wright, Darren's campaign manager
- Jamie Anne Allman as Terry Marek, Mitch's younger sister and Rosie's aunt
- Liam James as Jack Linden, Sarah's son

=== Recurring ===
- Evan Bird as Tom Larsen, Rosie's brother
- Seth Isaac Johnson as Denny Larsen, Rosie's brother
- Tom Butler as Lesley Adams, the mayor of Seattle
- Mark Moses as Lt. Erik Carlson, the detectives' new boss
- Colin Lawrence as Benjamin Abani, Adams' campaign manager
- Claudia Ferri as Nicole Jackson, the manager of the Wapi Eagle Casino
- Patti Kim as Roberta Drays, the security chief at the Wapi Eagle Casino
- Tyler Johnston as Alexi Giffords, a mob thug of Janek's and reluctant friend to Rosie
- Brian Markinson as Gil Sloane, Holder's NA sponsor
- Don Thompson as Janek Kovarsky, Stan's former mob boss
- Barclay Hope as Michael Ames, Jasper's father
- Katie Findlay as Rosie Larsen
- Garry Chalk as Lt. Michael Oakes, the detectives' former boss
- Alan Dale as Senator Eaton, Gwen's father
- Brendan Sexton III as Belko Royce, Stan's co-worker and close friend (Billed as main cast in season premiere, guest in latter episode)
- Annie Corley as Regi Darnell, Sarah's social worker and mother figure
- Richard Harmon as Jasper Ames, Rosie's ex-boyfriend
- Kacey Rohl as Sterling Fitch, Rosie's best friend
- Lee Garlington as Ruth Yitanes, local senator endorsing Darren's campaign
- Marin Ireland as Liz Holder, Stephen's sister
- Ashley Johnson as Amber Ahmed, Bennet Ahmed's wife
- Brandon Jay McLaren as Bennet Ahmed, a teacher at Rosie's high school
- Callum Keith Rennie as Rick Felder, Sarah's fiancé

== Production ==
The series was renewed for a second season on June 13, 2011, after the twelfth episode aired. Production began on the 13-episode second season in November 2011. Series developer Veena Sud confirmed the Rosie Larsen murder investigation would be solved, and a second case would be introduced. Mark Moses joined the recurring cast as Lt. Carlson, the detectives' new boss overseeing the Larsen investigation. Originally reported as a potential recurring character, Marin Ireland appeared as Holder's sister in an episode of the season.

Mireille Enos (Sarah Linden) spoke about the differences between the series' seasons: "It's been a continuation — we picked up right where we left off. Last year was exciting because it was new, but there was also the anxiety of like, 'Well, did it work?' This year we know that the formula works and there is kind of a calm about that. There haven't been any surprises about working together and letting the story unfold, and I think the writers have done a really incredible job this year."

Joel Kinnaman (Stephen Holder) spoke about the limits he has had with his character portrayal: "Until the eighth episode of the first season, there was an architecture in the storytelling where they didn't want the audience to know if Holder was a good guy or a bad guy. That was very limiting [both in terms of] what they put in the edit and the direction I was given. It wasn't until after the eighth episode that I felt I could be the character 100 percent, that I was allowed to react freely to situations. After they revealed that he wasn't a bad guy, it gave him some more space. It doesn't feel like I've been shooting more material, but it's been a little bit more about Holder's journey in the second season."

Brent Sexton (Stan Larsen) spoke about portraying his character from the first to second seasons: "I don't know if there's anything [different] in terms of the performance, but the conflict is different, and obviously Stan is going to be different. Last year Stan was a bit frozen in inaction. This year, he's trying to take action and get resolution on his past, his present, and his future, but to gain resolution on one of those creates conflict on another."

Billy Campbell (Darren Richmond) spoke about having to play his character from a hospital bed or a wheelchair this season: "It's actually kind of liberating in a strange way, acting-wise. There's not as much blocking to remember, you really can't futz around too much, and it sort of distills everything in a way. And practically speaking, it was actually a little slice of heaven because I came to work and got to lie in bed for eight hours! There were plenty of days when it came to be lunchtime and I would say, 'OK guys, see you later, wake me up when it's time for the scene after lunch!' I was hooked up to a lot of wires and it was a five minute process to get unhooked, so I did a lot of sleeping."

Eric Ladin (Jamie Wright) spoke about portraying a political operative: "I read some books and tried to track down and speak to some political advisers and strategists. There's one book in particular called How to Rig an Election by Allen Raymond — it's a good example of somebody who learned at a young age what it's like behind the scenes of a political campaign. I took specific stories out of that book and spoke with the author briefly over the phone, and I tried to translate them into Jamie's life and shared a lot of them with Veena [Sud] and the entire writers' room." When it was finally revealed to Ladin that his character was involved in Rosie's death, he reflected about the entire character portrayal: "I give a lot of credit to the writers. They did a great job of putting things in and adding to the story line and the back story to facilitate me with what I needed. I went back and reviewed things. I think if I'd known at the very beginning, I would have done some things different. That's probably what they were nervous about. They didn't tell me or Jamie Anne Allman for that reason. They didn't want it to influence our performances."

Jamie Anne Allman (Terry Marek) spoke about the seasonal transition and her view on doing guest appearances and being a regular character: "This season, they've written me some very interesting, unique things that I didn't get to dabble with last year. So, every scene is different and I just take each scene individually. Then when I watch it as a whole I'm like, 'Oh, it was one piece.' I take each scene, look at it, break it down and it's a new experience every time, with every scene. But being with the characters the whole time, for a long period of time really allows you to sink your teeth into something more than if you're just doing a guest star. If you're doing a guest star spot, you come in at the heightened part of your character who's having a breakdown or is having a real moment, and in a show where you're the same character the whole time it's a progression. You have to let it build." She was shocked to learn that her character was Rosie Larsen's killer: "Veena Sud had called me a couple hours before I was going in to read for the table read for episode 13, the last episode, that I was the killer. When she gave me the news, I was upset, I started crying. I actually thought that while I was contemplating, 'What if I'm the killer?,' that I'd be excited but I started crying and started feeling bad for Terry. 'Oh man, this is a really tragic situation.'"

Brian Markinson (Gil Sloane) spoke about his appearance in the first season and the reveal of who his character is in the second: "When I was brought on in the first season, my character name on the page was 'Man in Suit.' And they said, 'You're going to be back,' but they couldn't tell me anything about anything. So I took the job thinking that my character had a history, but that he was a good guy. And then this season, I saw Veena Sud after reading the first two episodes and I said, 'You really pulled the rug out from under me!' I had just made the assumption that I was going to be this great guy who took care of Holder and had these heartfelt conversations over coffee about his addiction. So naïve. Dan Attias, who directed that episode, said, 'This scene is why you took the job.' It was a beautiful and surprising scene. They completely changed tack on me and in that one speech. It just completely turns the tables."

Katie Findlay (Rosie Larsen) spoke about playing a deceased character and about only appearing in the series during flashbacks: "Is there anything not strange about playing a deceased character? I've never done it before. It's interesting when you only have so much time that's in your hands to tell your part of the story. Having to pop in and out of the plot and work with the space that I had was really fun and challenging... I kind of enjoyed the space that I had to work with and I trusted that in the end that they would bring it back around. I don't think it would work if you saw more of her — you're getting what everyone else remembers, and it's sort of all the more haunting for that."

== Episodes ==
No. overall	No. in season	Title	Directed by	Written by	Original release date	Prod. code	US viewers (millions)
14	1	"Reflections"	Agnieszka Holland	Veena Sud	April 1, 2012	BDH201/S201	1.80
Sarah Linden remains in Seattle to try to solve Rosie Larsen's case, after learning partner Stephen Holder's evidence of Darren Richmond was doctored. Belko Royce is arrested for shooting his mother and Richmond. Gwen Eaton and Jamie Wright learn that Richmond recovered from surgery but is paralyzed below the waist.
15	2	"My Lucky Day"	Dan Attias	Dawn Prestwich & Nicole Yorkin	April 1, 2012	BDH202/S202	1.80
Rosie Larsen's bloody backpack is dropped off at the Larsen garage's doorstep — a sign to her father Stan that the police arrested the wrong person. Gwen provides more information to Sarah about Richmond and the night he was suspected of killing Rosie. Holder begins to realize he is a pawn in a bigger conspiracy. Richmond wakes up to learn he is no longer a suspect but is paralyzed.
16	3	"Numb"	Brad Anderson	Eliza Clark	April 8, 2012	BDH203/S203	1.81
Sarah learns of Rosie's backpack and forces herself to confront Holder. Richmond ponders his future as both a paraplegic and mayoral candidate. Mitch Larsen begins her journey.
17	4	"Ogi Jun"	Phil Abraham	Jeremy Doner	April 15, 2012	BDH204/S204	1.65
The detectives learn the identity of the bearer of the Ogi Jun tattoo. Jamie and Richmond discuss the future of the campaign. Stan learns he is not free of his mob past.
18	5	"Ghosts of the Past"	Ed Bianchi	Wendy Riss	April 22, 2012	BDH205/S205	1.59
The detectives obtain a voicemail left by Rosie when she was alive. Mitch talks with a girl the same age as Rosie. Darren learns who may have been behind his previous arrest.
19	6	"Openings"	Kevin Bray	Aaron Zelman	April 29, 2012	BDH206/S206	1.35
The detectives investigate the Larsen family, which leads them to a new suspect. Stan's past still haunts him. Mitch tries to help a runaway girl. Richmond gets a surprise visit from Gwen.
20	7	"Keylela"	Nicole Kassell	Dan Nowak	May 6, 2012	BDH207/S207	1.34
The investigation focuses on the casino. Richmond's renewed campaign holds a press conference with Stan as a surprise supporter.
21	8	"Off the Reservation"	Veena Sud	Nathaniel Halpern	May 13, 2012	BDH208/S208	1.61
Sarah frantically searches for her missing partner. Stan meets with several people regarding his reward to find his daughter's killer. Richmond returns to work.
22	9	"Sayonara, Hiawatha"	Phil Abraham	Nicole Yorkin & Dawn Prestwich	May 20, 2012	BDH209/S209	1.31
Sarah obtains Rosie's keys, which allow access to the casino's tenth floor. Stan learns of son Tommy's bad behavior at school. Mitch meets Rosie's biological father David Rainer and gets to know about Rosie's plan. Richmond asks casino owner Nicole Jackson to assist the police. Sarah makes a new discovery on tenth floor of the casino, but is now in trouble.
23	10	"72 Hours"	Nicole Kassell	Eliza Clark	May 27, 2012	BDH210/S210	1.31
Linden finds herself in a psychiatric ward, while Holder continues the investigation. Stan attempts to repair the damage his past actions have caused. Richmond returns to the Seattle All Stars basketball program.
24	11	"Bulldog"	Ed Bianchi	Jeremy Doner	June 3, 2012	BDH211/S211	1.67
The detectives gain access to the casino's tenth floor, which only causes them to elude the police. Both Stan and Richmond make decisions that affect their futures.
25	12	"Donnie or Marie"	Keith Gordon	Aaron Zelman & Wendy Riss	June 10, 2012	BDH212/S212	1.84
The detectives look to Richmond's campaign staff for suspects, while he gets ready for the election. Mitch and Stan Larsen try to get their family back to normal.
26	13	"What I Know"	Patty Jenkins	Veena Sud & Dan Nowak	June 17, 2012	BDH213/S213	1.45
Jamie takes Richmond back to the office, where he reveals that Rosie had overheard everything between him, Chief Jackson, and Michael Ames about planting the Indian bones on the waterfront and that he had discovered her there after Jackson and Ames had left. When Rosie started screaming, Jamie hit her to quiet her, and she fell. Thinking he had killed her, Jamie drove her to the woods, but Rosie surprised him and ran, and he chased her to the lake where she was eventually dumped. Linden and Holder arrive as Jamie takes out Richmond's gun and points it at Holder; Holder shoots him in self-defense, in a clear case of "suicide by cop." Thinking the case is solved, Linden and Holder go to the Larsens and find them gone and Terry packing up the garage. There, Linden connects Terry to the killing through the broken taillight on her car and Terry makes her confession: she had picked Ames up from the ferry, and they were about to depart for Las Vegas, when Ames received a call from a panicked Jamie. Terry drove them to the lake, where Jamie and Ames get into a fierce argument about what to do with the girl, still alive in the trunk. Terry, not realizing Rosie was there and fearing that she could lose Ames, pushed the car into the lake. Terry is arrested and refuses a lawyer. In Jamie's apartment, they find the missing footage from Rosie's camera, another super 8 film called, What I Know, which Linden anonymously sends to the Larsens. It shows Rosie preparing to depart for her journey, and she professes her love for her parents and brothers, giving the Larsen family closure. Richmond is elected mayor and decides to leave his wife's death in the past. Linden lets go of the Larsen case.

== Reception ==
=== Critical response ===
The early second-season episodes received generally favorable reviews from critics, and received a Metacritic score of 68 out of 100 based on 23 reviews. Lori Rackl of the Chicago Sun-Times stated: "Few television shows are as addictive as this pensive, wonderfully paced suspenser." The Washington Post's Hank Stuever stated: "My own enjoyment of The Killing begins and ends with the gloom so brilliantly conveyed by its pace and performances." Brian Lowry of Variety stated the series remained "compelling," adding "the writers... are adept at overcoming the stodgy pace by dangling tantalizing clues near each hour's end, creating a strong pull to see what transpires next." HitFix's Alan Sepinwall compared this season to the first and called it "better". He added: "The performances are still good, and now the characterization is a bit better. When you add that to the fine atmosphere... and you view the mystery itself as a kind of necessary evil that allows you to see the parts of the show that do work, then it's not bad."

The season finale, "What I Know", received generally positive reviews. Sepinwall stated: "I'd like to say that season 2 of The Killing was an improvement on season 1, and in some ways, it probably was. The second season certainly did a better job of doing what Veena Sud claimed to be doing last year, in that it took advantage of the extra time to sketch in some of the characters... I honestly feel like any kinder feelings I have for the second season came from the complete lack of investment I had in it." Sean McKenna of TV Fanatic rated the finale 4.7 out of 5 stars, but, upon first viewing, "wasn't sure what to feel. I wasn't elated. I wasn't excited," however, after watching it again, was "sucked into the world, mesmerized not by the victory of our hero cops...but by the gut-wrenching moments that unfolded." CraveOnline's William Bibbiani called the finale "an odd duck". After citing Jamie's early revelation as "melodramatic silliness", Bibbiani added: "The rest of the episode gets its job done, with one major, glaring flaw. The characters end up more or less where they need to be, but some nearly ridiculous loose ends remain." Brandon Nowalk of The A.V. Club rated this finale a C−, calling it "so unconvincing", adding "I couldn't believe how little all this resolution affected me after The Killing so thrillingly took my grudging engagement for a ride a few weeks ago. This is the same show that delivered Richmond's hospital nightmare, the hunt for Holder, the anti-Western standoff "Sayonara, Hiawatha", and the crazy train of the last two weeks? No, this is the full-circle episode, the one that takes the show back to its roots. Wah wah."

=== Awards and nominations ===
In 2013, the second season earned two nominations at the 39th Saturn Awards, one for Best Syndicated Cable Television Series and for Best Actress in Television for Mireille Enos.

== Home media releases ==
The second season of The Killing was released on DVD on April 2, 2013, exclusively through Amazon's CreateSpace manufacture-on-demand program. In regions 2 and B, it was released on October 27, 2014.
