= What I Know =

- The Killing episode
- Episode no.: Season 2 Episode 13
- Directed by: Patty Jenkins
- Written by: Veena Sud; Dan Nowak
- Production code: BDH213/S213
- Original air date: June 17, 2012

Guest appearances
- Marcel Maillard as Ted Wright; Seth Isaac Johnson as Denny Larsen; Evan Bird as Tommy Larsen; Claudia Ferri as Nicole Jackson; Katie Findlay as Rosie Larsen; Barclay Hope as Michael Ames; Tom Butler as Mayor Lesley Adams

Episode chronology
← Previous "Donnie or Marie"	Next → "The Jungle"
- The Killing (season 2)

"What I Know" is the twenty-sixth episode of the American television drama series The Killing, and the thirteenth episode and season finale of its second season, which aired on the AMC channel in the United States on June 17, 2012. It is co-written by series developer Veena Sud and Dan Nowak, and is directed by Patty Jenkins. In the episode, the detectives close the Rosie Larsen case, arresting the person responsible; the Larsen family prepares to leave their former home, but not before learning a family member was involved in Rosie's death; and Darren Richmond (Billy Campbell) becomes Seattle mayor only to learn that campaign manager Jamie Wright (Eric Ladin) was involved in Rosie's death. The episode was originally the final episode to air due to show's cancellation, but the show was revived by AMC in early 2013.

== Plot ==
It is October 5, 2010, Tommy (Evan Bird) and Denny Larsen (Seth Isaac Johnson) play with Rosie (Katie Findlay) while Mitch (Michelle Forbes) packs for the family camping trip. Rosie is not going on the trip, so Mitch gives her instructions for after the Halloween dance. Toting her pink backpack, Rosie pauses at the door to watch Stan (Brent Sexton) conduct business on the phone, then she walks out.

In present day, Linden (Mireille Enos) and Holder (Joel Kinnaman) look for Jamie at Richmond's election rally. Gwen (Kristin Lehman) tells them he is late, as is Richmond. Holder calls in a search for Jamie's campaign car. In the parking garage, Gwen tells them that a driver dropped Richmond off at Jamie's grandfather's house. At the house, Jamie finds his grandfather, Ted Wright (Marcel Maillard), talking to Richmond. As Jamie leaves with Richmond, Ted mentions figuring out where Jamie was the night "that girl got killed". Jamie brings Richmond back to the office and informs him that Mayor Adams is conceding. After Richmond demands to know what is really going on, Jamie admits he arranged to plant the Indian bones at the waterfront construction site to hurt Adams' campaign. Chief Jackson and Michael Ames helped and, in exchange, Jamie promised that Richmond would approve the construction of a casino on the site. When Richmond asks what happened to Rosie, Jamie admits to an "accident".

In a flashback to the night of October 5, on the Wapi Casino's tenth floor, Jamie, Ames (Barclay Hope) and Chief Jackson (Claudia Ferri) discuss the Indian bones. All prepare to leave, but Jamie stays behind after hearing the noise of a phone ringing. As he walks back, he discovers Rosie. Jamie questions Rosie, who insists she did not hear anything. Rosie then accidentally drops her camera. As Jamie suspiciously walks to pick up the camera, Rosie tries to escape, but Jamie grabs her. Rosie starts screaming, but Jamie punches her to keep her quiet, knocking her unconscious.

Jamie tells Richmond that he panicked, that Rosie was going to "ruin everything". Richmond notes that Rosie was alive when the car sank into the lake.

In another flashback, Jamie chases a screaming Rosie through the woods near Discovery Park and again knocks her out with a flashlight to silence her.

Jamie insists that he was only thinking of Richmond, brandishes a gun and scorns his idealism. He tells him that if he wants to be a leader, he has to be willing to get "blood on your hands". After a dispatcher informs Holder that Jamie's campaign vehicle was found at City Hall, he, Linden, and Gwen arrive at the campaign office. Jamie commits suicide by cop when he points the gun at Linden, and Holder then shoots him dead. Later, a cop informs them that the gun was not loaded.

At the police station, Ames and Chief Jackson sit in separate interrogation rooms. Holder shows Linden items that were found in Jamie's house, including the missing film from Rosie's Super 8 camera in her backpack. Lt. Carlson (Mark Moses) commends them but adds that not enough evidence exists to link Ames to the murder, despite Linden informing him that Jamie's phone records show that he called Ames at 3:37 AM that night.

Stan wakes to find Mitch clearing out Rosie's room. He helps her pack Rosie's belongings into boxes. The Larsens later visit their new house. When Stan asks Mitch if she is sure she wants to move, she says yes.

Richmond writes a press release in his office, despite Gwen's insistence that he rest. He replies that he does not want Jamie's actions to define his legacy as mayor. Former mayor Lesley Adams (Tom Butler) later speaks with Richmond in the City Council chambers and offers his condolences about Jamie. He also tells him that he has the makings of a great leader.

As Stan packs in the garage, he gazes at Belko's name on a locker. Terry (Jamie Anne Allman) arrives to help Mitch pack, and Mitch says she regrets that she did not pay attention to Rosie. Terry assures her that she did.

Gwen calls Richmond, who is at the cemetery visiting his wife Lily's grave. He admits that it is time to move on and she smiles.

The detectives return to the lake in Discovery Park where Rosie's body was found. Linden notes that no one has said what happened there. Holder suggests they inform the Larsens. They find Terry in the Larsen garage and tell her they found Rosie's killer, but do not say who it is. After Terry goes upstairs, Linden notices the tail light on Terry's car is broken, recalling Jasper describing the car that dropped his father off on the night of Rosie's murder as having a broken tail light. In Rosie's room, they confront Terry about being at the lake when Rosie died. As Stan and Mitch enter the room, Terry apologizes, asking them to not be mad at her.

In a final flashback from Terry's point of view, Jamie yells at Ames, who was driven to the lake by Terry. She hears that Jamie has someone locked in the trunk of his campaign car, a witness who accidentally overheard Jamie, Ames and Chief Jackson earlier that night. Ames says that he is not going to be a part of the current events and calls off the whole deal. He insists that he will not leave his wife and start a new company if it requires him to kill someone. As Ames and Jamie continue arguing, Terry quietly goes to the campaign car and shifts it into "drive." The car rolls into the lake and slowly submerges as Rosie screams.

Crying, Terry insists to the Larsens that she did not know that it was Rosie in the trunk. Holder restrains Stan as he lunges at Terry. Linden arrests Terry. At the station, Holder tells Linden that Terry declined a lawyer. He gives Linden her badge, which Lt. Carlson reinstated, and they are handed Rosie's film after it has been verified as a "school project". She watches the film on a projector.

Gwen arrives at the office to see Richmond preparing for a meeting. Ames and Chief Jackson arrive and shake hands with Richmond, and Jackson thanks Richmond for his help in getting the charges dropped. Richmond closes the door on Gwen.

The Larsen boys wake their parents after finding a video in the mail. Together they watch Rosie's film, called "What I Know," in which she expresses her dreams of traveling and love for her family. Outside, the detectives sit in a car. Holder gets a phone call that a dead body has been found near the Sea-Tac airport. Linden gets out of the car. Holder insists they got the "bad guy". She asks laconically who that was. He drives off, leaving her behind to stare at the Larsen garage, then she walks away.

== Production ==
Jamie Anne Allman spoke about the shock of learning that her character Terry Marek was Rosie Larsen's killer: "Veena Sud had called me a couple hours before I was going in to read for the table read for episode 13, the last episode, that I was the killer. When she gave me the news, I was upset, I started crying. I actually thought that while I was contemplating, 'What if I'm the killer?,' that I'd be excited but I started crying and started feeling bad for Terry. 'Oh man, this is a really tragic situation.'" Allman also spoke about the point in the season when she began to wonder if Terry was the killer: "I'm sure everybody on the cast was wondering if they were the killer or not at some point. But there was a scene that I alluded to some things that I had questioned whether or not I was the killer. It was the scene where [the Larsen boys] were playing with the trunk. I come down from the apartment and I see them in the garage locked in the trunk and I got really upset at Tommy. I remember [the writers] really wanting me to really shake Tommy and be very upset about this. I thought, why would I be that mad at him? It could've been, this is Terry not wanting the boys to mess around because it was how Rosie died or this is a flashback for her because she was involved." This scene was in the "Ogi Jun" episode.

== Reception ==
=== Critical reception ===
"What I Know" received generally positive reviews. Sean McKenna of TV Fanatic rated the episode 4.7 out of 5 stars, but, upon first viewing, "wasn't sure what to feel. I wasn't elated. I wasn't excited," however, after watching it again, was "sucked into the world, mesmerized not by the victory of our hero cops...but by the gut-wrenching moments that unfolded." CraveOnline's William Bibbiani called the episode "an odd duck". After citing Jamie's early revelation as "melodramatic silliness", Bibbiani added: "The rest of the episode gets its job done, with one major, glaring flaw. The characters end up more or less where they need to be, but some nearly ridiculous loose ends remain." Brandon Nowalk of The A.V. Club rated this episode a C−, calling it "so unconvincing", adding "I couldn't believe how little all this resolution affected me after The Killing so thrillingly took my grudging engagement for a ride a few weeks ago. This is the same show that delivered Richmond’s hospital nightmare, the hunt for Holder, the anti-Western standoff "Sayonara, Hiawatha", and the crazy train of the last two weeks? No, this is the full-circle episode, the one that takes the show back to its roots. Wah wah."

=== Ratings ===
The finale was watched by 1.45 million viewers, down from last week's episode, but received a 0.5 rating in the 18-49 demographic, even with the seasonal ratings average.
