= 72 Hours (The Killing) =

- The Killing episode
- Episode no.: Season 2 Episode 10
- Directed by: Nicole Kassell
- Written by: Eliza Clark
- Production code: BDH210/S210
- Original air date: May 27, 2012

Guest appearances
- Mark Moses as Lt. Erik Carlson; Janet Kidder as Dr. Ann Kerry; Annie Corley as Regi Darnell; Randall Edwards as Police Technician Ray; Brandon Jay McLaren as Bennet Ahmed; Ashley Johnson as Amber Ahmed; Alex Zahara as Uniform Cop; Brad Kelly as Joseph Nowak; Claudia Ferri as Nicole Jackson; Patti Kim as Roberta Drays; Callum Keith Rennie as Rick Felder

Episode chronology
← Previous "Sayonara, Hiawatha"	Next → "Bulldog"
- The Killing (season 2)

"72 Hours" is the twenty-third episode of the American television drama series The Killing, and the tenth of its second season, which aired on the AMC channel in the United States on May 27, 2012. It is written by Eliza Clark and directed by Nicole Kassell. In the episode, Sarah Linden (Mireille Enos) finds herself in a psychiatric ward, while Stephen Holder (Joel Kinnaman) continues the investigation. Stan Larsen (Brent Sexton) attempts to repair the damage that his past actions have caused. Darren Richmond (Billy Campbell) returns to the Seattle All Stars basketball program.

== Plot ==
Linden wakes up in a hospital bed with an identification bracelet on her wrist. She walks down the hall, tries to open a locked door—which bears a sign outside: "Psychiatry Acute Ward". In the waiting room, Lt. Carlson (Mark Moses) tells Holder that Linden attacked a casino worker while trying to kill herself. Holder says the tribe is hiding evidence and informs him that the Larsen case files disappeared on the way to county police. Linden tries to call Holder from a nursing station but is told the phone is only available during certain hours. She learns she is on suicide watch for 72 hours.

At the Larsen home, Stan apologizes to Terry (Jamie Anne Allman), who says the case may never be solved, that he is angry because he cannot let go, and suggests he fix what he can. Stan later approaches Amber (Ashley Johnson) and Bennet (Brandon Jay McLaren) Ahmed at their front door. He admits to them that he was wrong, that Rosie cared for Bennett, and that she came to say goodbye that night. Bennet threatens to call the police unless Stan leaves. Amber later walks out her front door and turns on the porch light, realizing Stan has fixed it. A crying Stan later calls Rosie's phone and leaves a message, apologizing for never telling her that he was not her biological father. He then surprises Terry and the boys with a bulldog.

At the marina, Holder asks Regi (Annie Corley) to help get Linden released from the hospital. She says that only Linden's psychiatrist can do so. She also mentions that she has seen what happens to Linden when she neglects everything else in her life, and that is how it started "last time". Holder notices a Mayor Adams billboard at the waterfront construction site and notes Michael Ames is the project manager. He calls police technician Ray (Randall Edwards) at the station, who researches and tells him that a man was arrested and then released after breaking into the site on the night of Rosie's murder.

Linden meets with a psychiatrist, Dr. Ann Kerry (Janet Kidder), who says Linden may leave the hospital early if she cooperates. Kerry suggests they discuss the prior murder case that previously sent Linden to the psychiatry ward. Linden tells her about that case, during which she found a six-year-old boy in an apartment with his mother's decomposing body. The boy, who continuously drew pictures of trees, ended up in foster care. Linden discusses both murder cases with the doctor, suggesting that both victims were "trying to tell her something". The doctor asks why the two cases mean so much, but Linden quietens, demands to leave, and struggles against two orderlies who come in to restrain her.

At a Seattle All Stars basketball event, Jamie Wright (Eric Ladin) argues they should be courting votes they do not already have, but Gwen Eaton (Kristin Lehman) reassures Richmond to campaign for what feels genuine. Richmond shoots some baskets from his wheelchair, while a man behind Gwen videotapes the event. Later in the office, Jamie finds a cufflink with the city seal, shows it to Richmond and says Gwen closed the office the night before. They both wonder why she would be meeting with the mayor.

At the waterfront, an officer (Alex Zahara) tells Holder he arrested a man named Joseph Nowak for breaking into the construction site on the night of Rosie's murder, but that Ames did not press charges against Nowak. The officer adds that Nowak's reason for the break-in was not construction related, noting that Nowak works for Janek Kovarsky. Holder meets with Linden during visiting hours and briefs her on the latest developments in the case. Dazed, Linden keeps mentioning the City Hall keycard that she saw on the casino's tenth floor. Holder vows to get her out. He then finds Joseph Nowak (Brad Kelly) at a lumber yard and chases him down, demanding to know about the waterfront activity that night. Holder meets Carlson to tell him "all our players" are involved in the murder: Nowak was at the mayor's construction site to bury native-American bones, and his arrest prompted a meeting between Ames, Chief Jackson and Mayor Adams. Rosie saw the meeting and was killed. Holder demands Carlson give him Linden's psychiatrist's contact information.

Gwen tells Richmond that a video from his All Stars appearance has become a viral online hit. He asks why she met with Mayor Adams and she says she planned to blackmail him about kissing her when she was underage. Richmond comforts her. She later hands a man an envelope out her car window, congratulating him on his work on the video.

Talking with Dr. Kerry, Linden expresses doubts about the father's arrest in the previous murder. Kerry mentions Linden's mother, who abandoned her at age five, and Linden insists she is fine. Kerry points out that her son is gone and she was supposed to be married a few days ago. A hospital worker interrupts to say Linden is being released. In the waiting room, Linden's ex-fiancé (Callum Keith Rennie), Dr. Rick Felder, who is Linden's psychiatrist, tells Holder he will release Sarah, but cannot be involved any further. Linden sees Rick from an adjacent room, but he quickly leaves. Holder drives while Sarah sleeps in the passenger seat. At the casino, Chief Jackson (Claudia Ferri) tells someone on her phone that the police will never find anything. Roberta Drays (Patti Kim) monitors a construction crew resuming work on the tenth-floor room. The blood-stained City Hall keycard lies unnoticed under the floorboards.

== Reception ==
=== Critical reception ===
"72 Hours" received mostly positive reviews. Sean McKenna of TV Fanatic rated the episode 4.5 out of 5 stars, calling it "another quiet episode, but The Killing does them with such a tenacity that even those still and silent moments scream as loud as can be." The A.V. Club's Brandon Nowalk rated this episode a B−, saying "'72 Hours' feels caught between what The Killing was and what it has recently become, which is admittedly a false dichotomy. There's an obviousness, though, that can't entirely be chalked up to pulp's habit of sorting characters into situational conventions." William Bibbiani of CraveOnline called "72 Hours" a "filler episode, disguised as something more". He added, "It could have worked out, but besides the revelation that Linden was engaged to her old psychiatrist, which raises a few questions that have nothing to do with the main storyline, it gives us nothing new besides a connection between several of the key suspects, which could have been integrated into just about any episode of the series."

=== Ratings ===
The episode was watched by 1.31 million viewers and received an adult 18-49 rating of 0.3, one-tenth lower than the previous episode.
