= Ogi Jun =

- The Killing episode
- Episode no.: Season 2 Episode 4
- Directed by: Phil Abraham
- Written by: Jeremy Doner
- Production code: BDH204/S204
- Original air date: April 15, 2012

Guest appearances
- Martin Cummins as FBI Agent Corey Petersen; Maria Marlow as Monica Krol; Don Thompson as Janek Kovarsky; Evan Bird as Tommy Larsen; Kacey Rohl as Sterling Fitch; Tom Butler as Mayor Lesley Adams; Eitra Kennedy as Benissimo Lee; Annie Corley as Regi Darnell; Tyler Johnston as Alexi Giffords; Kelli-Ruth Mercier as DCS Case Worker

Episode chronology
← Previous "Numb"	Next → "Ghosts of the Past"
- The Killing (season 2)

"Ogi Jun" is the seventeenth episode of the American television drama series The Killing, and the fourth of its second season, which aired on April 15, 2012. The episode is written by Jeremy Doner and is directed by Phil Abraham. In the episode, the detectives learn the identity of the bearer of the Ogi Jun manga tattoo; Jamie Wright (Eric Ladin) and Darren Richmond (Billy Campbell) discuss the future of the campaign; and Stan Larsen (Brent Sexton) learns that he is not free of his mob past.

== Plot ==
Detectives Sarah Linden (Mireille Enos) and Stephen Holder (Joel Kinnaman) sit in a car across the street from the Larsen garage, where they see a group of men arrive to get into two Larsen moving vans. Since they are not dressed as movers, Holder believes that the men are not Stan's employees. The detectives follow the vans to the back of a Polish restaurant to watch the men load boxes into the vans. He recalls that the restaurant is owned by Janek Kovarsky, and she ponders if Stan Larsen is back with the Polish mob. The next morning, they visit Corey Petersen (Martin Cummins), an organized crime specialist with the FBI. They speak of the possible mob connection to the Larsen case and show him the Ogi Jun tattoo from Rosie's Super 8 mm film. Not recognizing the tattoo, he does note that arson is Janek's specialty, alluding to the previous Beau Soleil building fire. Petersen also tells them that Stan Larsen is suspected of killing a man named Piotr Michaelski in exchange for being allowed to leave the mob. He shows them a picture of Piotr in the trunk of a car, hands bound, shot in the head. Peterson also mentions Piotr had a wife.

Stan Larsen receives a phone call about Belko Royce. He tells them that they are not cremating him and that he will come to claim his body for burial. Terry Marek (Jamie Anne Allman) tells him that his son Tommy has been acting out for two days. He says that he will deal with that later as he has to the morgue for Belko. Later at the morgue, Stan learns that a funeral home has already retrieved Belko's body. He walks into a church and finds Janek Kovarsky (Don Thompson) sitting by Belko's closed coffin. Janek reflects on the difference between Belko and Stan, calling Belko the better man. He informs Stan that school bullies have been teasing Tommy about Rosie. At the school, Stan sees his son (Evan Bird) getting bullied and tells him to fight back rather than walk away.

The detectives question Monica Krol (Maria Marlow), Piotr's wife, who says the police should have arrested Stan 17 years ago. She appears to harbor a grudge, but not enough to warrant investigating for Rosie's murder. At the station, Holder suggests asking Rosie's friend Sterling Fitch about the tattoo. Linden gets a phone call from a lawyer, saying that her ex-husband is suing for joint custody of Jack. At the school, Sterling (Kacey Rohl) tells them that the tattoo belongs to a man who used to hang around the Larsen house and creeped Rosie out. Down the hall, Jasper Ames (Richard Harmon) watches them.

At the hospital, Darren Richmond orders Jamie Wright to help him into a wheelchair. Jamie cannot support Richmond's weight, and they fall to the floor. Later, Mayor Lesley Adams (Tom Butler) and Benjamin Abani (Colin Lawrence) visit. Adams says that he will support Darren's campaign in four years but Darren wonders if Adams was responsible for his arrest. Darren later informs Jamie that he is withdrawing from the race. Jamie argues with him, saying he has spent 10 years helping him. He tells Jamie to get a life.

In a juvenile prison, the detectives question Benissimo Lee (Eitra Kennedy), who is known for his tattoo work among the inmates. As a bribe, Sarah sneaks him a candy bar and shows him the Ogi Jun tattoo photo. He says he gave the tattoo to a foster kid named "Giffs". At the police station, Holder tells her that "Giffs" is Alexi Giffords, a foster child who went through five homes in 10 years. Giffords' file shows his current address, three blocks from the Larsens. While sitting in the car near Alexi's house, Sarah tells Holder that the foster records cannot be viewed without Alexi's consent. He recalls that she, like Alexi, ran away from foster homes as a child. Denying it, she orders him out of the car and to keep an eye on the house. She visits Regi Darnell (Annie Corley) to ask for access to Alexi's foster file. She refuses, but Sarah argues that it might help solve Rosie's murder.

While mopping his van, Stan finds frayed wiring on the floor and goes to Janek’s restaurant to confront him. Janek admits to burning down Beau Soleil, and Stan accuses him of playing a role in Rosie's murder. A young man slips out the door. Minutes later, the young man (Tyler Johnston) arrives at the house that Holder is monitoring. Noticing an Ogi Jun tattoo on the thug's arm, Holder realizes the man is Alexi, who sees Holder, runs, and gets away.

A Department of Children's Services case worker (Kelli-Ruth Mercier) meets Sarah in her car. She reveals that Alexi's birth name is Michaelski and that his mother is Monica Krol, as Holder finds a photo of a young Alexi with father Piotr in Alexi's apartment. Sarah arrives to find a piece of paper tucked inside an Ogi Jun manga comic. The paper is a drawing of Rosie with her face scratched out.

== Reception ==
=== Critical reception ===
"Ogi Jun" received mixed reviews. Brandon Nowalk of The A.V. Club rated this episode a C, saying "Like so many contemporary television dramas and B-movies with exorbitant budgets, The Killing's stuck straddling the expansive gulf between its origins—muscular, exploitative, low-rent crime pulp—and its aspirations—long-form prestige drama. So it winds up settling for shallow melodrama, deeply invested in the inner lives, well, inner griefs of all these characters connected to this single crime without much animating thematic purpose. It’s constantly dusting off the old dark discoveries and presenting them as new insights, when simply crafting a cold, hard narrative is more than enough." Paste magazine's Adam Vitcavage gave the episode a 7.3 rating, but commented: "The moody drama appears to be grasping at straws trying to find a new angle and acts as if the entire first season was a prologue to something bigger." William Bibbiani of CraveOnline called the episode a "refreshing change of pace", adding "'Ogi Jun' was a step in the right direction, but an episode with few actual highlights, making it a pleasing piece of the whole but hardly a stellar night of television on its own." TV Fanatic’s Sean McKenna rated the episode 4 out of 5 stars, commenting "There's still something to be said for this show and, despite certain aspects that can be grating or frustrating, the atmosphere of The Killing is certainly a change from other programs. The world isn't so cookie cutter perfect and as long as the rest of the season maintains balance and avoids clichés, the bigger mystery will hopefully be a satisfying payoff. Hopefully."

=== Ratings ===
The episode was watched by 1.65 million viewers and obtained a 0.6 adults 18-49 rating, marking the series' third-lowest ratings.
