= Reflections (The Killing) =

- The Killing episode
- Lieutenant Oakes (Garry Chalk, left) discusses Darren Richmond as a suspect with Sarah Linden (Mireille Enos, right)
- Episode no.: Season 2 Episode 1
- Directed by: Agnieszka Holland
- Written by: Veena Sud
- Production code: BDH201/S201
- Original air date: April 1, 2012

Guest appearances
- Garry Chalk as Lt. Michael Oakes; Tom Butler as Lesley Adams; Colin Lawrence as Benjamin Abani; Evan Bird as Tom Larsen; Seth Isaac Johnson as Denny Larsen; Brian Markinson as Gil Sloane; Andrew Airlie as Dr. Madigan

Episode chronology
← Previous "Orpheus Descending"	Next → "My Lucky Day"
- The Killing (season 2)

"Reflections" is the fourteenth episode of the American television drama series The Killing, which aired on April 1, 2012 as the first of a two-part second-season premiere. The episode is written by series creator Veena Sud and is directed by Agnieszka Holland. In the episode, Sarah remains in Seattle to try to solve Rosie Larsen's case once again, after learning Holder's evidence of Darren Richmond was doctored. Belko Royce is arrested for shooting his mother and Richmond. Gwen and Jamie learn that Richmond has recovered from surgery but is paralyzed below the waist.

== Plot ==
After learning that Darren Richmond (Billy Campbell) has been shot, Homicide detective Sarah Linden (Mireille Enos) and son Jack (Liam James) drive to the home of her boss, Lt. Michael Oakes (Garry Chalk). She tells Oakes that the tollbooth photo of Richmond the night of the murder was faked. He informs her that her partner Stephen Holder was assigned to Homicide by Gil Sloane in the county sheriff's department. She states that the sheriff's department handles bridges and tunnels. At the county records office, she gets differing stories about the bridge cameras that took the photo. When the manager calls her by name, she mentions that she never said who she was. At the county sheriff's office, Sarah asks for Gil only to learn that he has been retired for two months. She spots Gil's photo, recognizing him as Holder's Narcotics Anonymous sponsor. At an NA meeting, Sarah gets Gil's phone number from a sponsor phone list, then calls a colleague to trace it and get Gil's address. Holder (Joel Kinnaman) meanwhile continuously attempts to call Sarah, but she does not answer.

At the hospital, Jamie Wright (Eric Ladin), Richmond's campaign manager, tells the press that Richmond is undergoing surgery. Alone with campaign adviser Gwen Eaton (Kristin Lehman), he wonders how the police could have arrested Richmond for the murder if he was with Gwen all night. He also asks her where she was when Richmond was arrested. She replies that she wasn’t feeling well, then admits to Jamie that, on the night Rosie died, she was not with Richmond and that the police have her statement. A surgeon (Andrew Airlie) later tells Gwen and Jamie that Richmond survived his surgery but is paralyzed from the waist down.

After Holder learns that Richmond has been shot, he arrives at Belko Royce's house. Belko's mother (Patti Allan) lies dead in the bathtub. Belko had shot her before shooting Richmond. At Stan Larsen’s garage, Holder tells him that Belko, who is Stan's employee, is at police headquarters and adds that Stan’s daughter Rosie met Richmond through an escort agency. Stan (Brent Sexton) insists that the detective is wrong. Later, a police technician (Randall Edwards) gives Holder a stack of enlargements from Rosie's Super 8 mm film. A tattooed arm is reflected in Rosie's bike mirror. Gil Sloane (Brian Markinson) stops by to give Holder his new golden Homicide badge. In the police interrogation room, Stan meets with Belko (Brendan Sexton III), who tells him that he "did it." Stan does not reply. Belko later holds a cop hostage in the hallway and then puts a gun into his own mouth and kills himself.

At his house, Gil receives a reporter's phone call congratulating him on the evidence that led to Richmond's arrest. Gil hangs up and immediately erases his hard drive, which contains the toll booth photo. Outside, Linden is staking out Gil's house, and the reporter calls her to confirm that Gil has been congratulated. Gil gets into his car, and Linden follows him to the closed-down construction site for the Mayor's waterfront development project. The mayor’s campaign director Benjamin Abani (Colin Lawrence) arrives and Gil demands to know how a reporter got his phone number. In shadow, an unidentified photographer takes photos of Linden in her car.

== Reception ==
=== Critical reception ===
"Reflections" received mostly positive reviews from critics. Lori Rackl of Chicago Sun-Times stated: "This melancholy show isn't afraid to take a break from the sleuthing action to dwell on Rosie's suffering family. It does an exquisite job portraying the crushing grief, pain and anger that can fill the vacuum left by a murder victim." The Washington Post's Hank Steuver called the episode "solid and corrective, even stylishly penitential in the way it recomposes itself and gets on with the mystery." Dorothy Rabinowitz of The Wall Street Journal reflected on the episode by saying, "Everything that happens—new light cast on the character of a prime suspect, old bonds of love and family sundered by the pain of loss, trust between police partners shattered—gets its due scrutiny. That too is one of the signature qualities of this crime drama and its most important one." New York Magazine's Matt Zoller Seitz was a reviewer who panned the episode: "The acting, direction, photography, editing, and sound design are so superb that you may momentarily think you're seeing a vastly improved Killing, but after a moment you'll realize that it was always aces in those departments and that the show's weakest link, the writing, hasn't improved all that much."

=== Ratings ===
As the first of a two-part season two premiere, "Reflections" was watched by 1.80 million viewers, marking the series' fifth-lowest viewership.
