= My Lucky Day (The Killing) =

- The Killing episode
- Stan Larsen (Brent Sexton, right) looks through his murdered daughter's backpack which has appeared on his doorstep. Stephen Holder (Joel Kinnaman, left) and Terry Marek (Jamie Anne Allman) look on.
- Episode no.: Season 2 Episode 2
- Directed by: Dan Attias
- Written by: Dawn Prestwich; Nicole Yorkin
- Production code: BDH202/S202
- Original air date: April 1, 2012

Guest appearances
- Garry Chalk as Lt. Michael Oakes; Tom Butler as Lesley Adams; Colin Lawrence as Benjamin Abani; Evan Bird as Tom Larsen; Seth Isaac Johnson as Denny Larsen; Mark Moses as Lt. Erik Carlson; Brian Markinson as Gil Sloane; Darren Moore as Stu Engle; Don Thompson as Janek Kovarsky; Sofie Gråbøl as District Attorney Nilsen

Episode chronology
← Previous "Reflections"	Next → "Numb"
- The Killing (season 2)

"My Lucky Day" is the fifteenth episode of the American television drama series The Killing, which aired on April 1, 2012 as the second half of a two-part second-season premiere. The episode is written by series producers Dawn Prestwich and Nicole Yorkin and is directed by Dan Attias. In the episode, Rosie Larsen's bloody backpack is dropped off at the garage's doorstep—a sign to her father Stan that the police arrested the wrong person. Gwen provides more information to Sarah about Richmond and the night he was suspected of killing Rosie. Holder begins to realize that he is a pawn in a bigger conspiracy. Richmond wakes up to learn that he is no longer a suspect but is paralyzed.

The episode features a cameo from Sofie Gråbøl, the protagonist of the original Danish version of the series, Forbrydelsen.

== Plot ==
Stan Larsen (Brent Sexton) wakes in the middle of the night to learn that his son Denny (Seth Isaac Johnson) thinks he heard someone outside. Upon investigation near the front door, Stan trips over a pink backpack with the initials "RL". Detective Stephen Holder (Joel Kinnaman) arrives to seal the backpack's contents in evidence bags. Stan confirms that the backpack belongs to his daughter, Rosie. After realizing that the bag was placed outside after a suspect had been arrested, Stan demands protection for his family. Holder does not respond. On the phone, Lt. Michael Oakes (Garry Chalk) orders Holder to bring the backpack to the station immediately and give it to a technician named Stu (Darren Moore). Holder says that evidence in the past had normally been given to Gary, another tech. Oakes stands firm with his order. Holder turns in his own blue backpack. Oakes later tells Holder that forensic results only revealed Rosie's fingerprints on the backpack and insists that he drop the case. Holder ponders his boss' lies and Gil Sloane (Brian Markinson) tells him to stop speculating, adding that any blame on the case belongs to Sarah.

Detective Sarah Linden (Mireille Enos) visits Richmond's campaign adviser Gwen Eaton (Kristin Lehman). Again, she asks Gwen about Richmond's location on the night of Rosie's murder. Gwen remembers that Richmond smelled of saltwater that night—as he always does after kayaking. Sarah asks her for a key to Richmond's apartment. There, Sarah finds a photo of Richmond hugging his late wife Lily. An inscription on the back lists the photo as being taken in Tacoma, Washington on October 5, 2002.

At the hospital, the doctor recommends to Jamie Wright (Eric Ladin), Richmond's campaign manager, that someone close to Richmond be present when he is to be told about the paralysis. By phone, Jamie fails to reach Richmond's sister. In the room, Darren Richmond (Billy Campbell) wakes to realize something is wrong with his leg. Instead of telling Richmond himself about his paralysis, Jamie leaves. Richmond later tells Jamie that his doctor has informed him.

Sarah visits the inn where Richmond and Gwen stayed the night of Rosie's murder. The innkeeper (Sheelah Megill) gives directions to the location in Richmond's photo, then speaks of Richmond's love for wife Lily. After looking around the photo’s location, Sarah talks with a fisherman (Doug Abrahams) who spends a lot of time on the nearby river. Sarah later calls District Attorney Christina Nilsen (Sofie Gråbøl) to request a meeting regarding Richmond. Visiting Richmond, Sarah tells him she knows that he proposed to his wife on October 5, that each year was their anniversary, and that a fisherman had pulled him out of the water on the night of Rosie's murder. Richmond threatens to sue if the story gets out. She tells Nilsen that a witness can verify where Richmond was the night of the murder. Nilsen agrees to drop the charges and reopen the case. At the station, Sarah finds that Lt. Erik Carlson (Mark Moses) has taken Oakes' place due to his early retirement after Sarah’s sloppy police work. He gives her another chance with the Larsen case, after Nilsen insisted. Carlson orders Linden to work with Holder, even though she preferred to work alone. Later at Sarah's motel room, Holder repeatedly knocks on the door, wishing to explain. After getting no response from Sarah, who is listening inside, he drops his badge at her door and leaves.

After repeated attempts to get police protection, Stan arrives home to see a stranger approach his son Tommy outside. The man is a reporter who asks how Stan feels about the charges being dropped against Richmond. Stan then drives to a restaurant and asks Janek Kovarsky, an old mob acquaintance, to find and kill Rosie's murderer.

== Reception ==
=== Critical reception ===
Paired as a season premiere with the previous episode, "My Lucky Day" received mostly positive reviews from critics. Lori Rackl of Chicago Sun-Times stated: "This melancholy show isn't afraid to take a break from the sleuthing action to dwell on Rosie's suffering family. It does an exquisite job portraying the crushing grief, pain and anger that can fill the vacuum left by a murder victim." The Washington Post's Hank Steuver called the episode "solid and corrective, even stylishly penitential in the way it recomposes itself and gets on with the mystery." Dorothy Rabinowitz of The Wall Street Journal reflected on the episode by saying, "Everything that happens—new light cast on the character of a prime suspect, old bonds of love and family sundered by the pain of loss, trust between police partners shattered—gets its due scrutiny. That too is one of the signature qualities of this crime drama and its most important one." New York Magazine's Matt Zoller Seitz was a reviewer who panned the episode: "The acting, direction, photography, editing, and sound design are so superb that you may momentarily think you're seeing a vastly improved Killing, but after a moment you'll realize that it was always aces in those departments and that the show's weakest link, the writing, hasn't improved all that much."

=== Ratings ===
As the second half of a two-part season two premiere, "My Lucky Day" was watched by 1.80 million viewers, marking the series' fifth-lowest viewership.
