= Numb (The Killing) =

- The Killing episode
- Stan Larsen (Brent Sexton, right) speaks with Janek Kovarsky (Don Thompson, left), not knowing that the man may be behind his daughter's murder.
- Episode no.: Season 2 Episode 3
- Directed by: Brad Anderson
- Written by: Eliza Clark
- Production code: BDH203/S203
- Original air date: April 8, 2012

Guest appearances
- Chelsea Ricketts as Hitchhiker; Mark Moses as Lt. Erik Carlson; Sarah Strange as Claire; Garry Chalk as Michael Oakes; Arien Boey as Davie; Andrew Airlie as Dr. Alex Madigan; Tom Butler as Mayor Lesley Adams; Seth Isaac Johnson as Denny Larsen; Evan Bird as Tom Larsen; Don Thompson as Janek Kovarsky; Sean Owen Roberts as Logic; Sean Devine as Andre Newman; Lilli Clark as Nurse Katie Jordan; Alan Dale as Senator Eaton

Episode chronology
← Previous "My Lucky Day"	Next → "Ogi Jun"
- The Killing (season 2)

"Numb" is the sixteenth episode of the American television drama series The Killing, and the third of its second season, which aired on April 8, 2012. The episode is written by Eliza Clark and is directed by Brad Anderson. In the episode, Sarah learns of Rosie's backpack and forces herself to confront Holder; Richmond ponders his future as a paraplegic mayoral candidate; and Mitch Larsen returns.

== Plot ==
Mitch Larsen (Michelle Forbes) drives down a highway, with a photograph of her, her husband Stan, and daughter Rosie by her side. On the side of the road, she encounters a hitchhiker (Chelsea Ricketts) who resembles Rosie. Mitch continues on and checks into a motel room, where she opens her suitcase to remove a decorated shoebox. Sitting in a bar later, she does not answer a call from her sister Terry and notices a man looking her way. Later in her motel room, she hesitates to kiss the man, but then asks him to stay. The next day, she sees the teenage hitchhiker outside her window, smoking by the pool.

At police headquarters, Sarah Linden (Mireille Enos) is told that the tattoo spotted in Rosie's Super 8 mm film is the manga character Ogi Jun. She asks if the client list from Beau Soleil's computer servers has been retrieved and is told that Lt. Erik Carlson held up the search warrant. She asks Lt. Carlson (Mark Moses) about the warrant, and he replies that she needs to ask him before requesting one, citing a crackdown on recent police procedure. Sarah visits the Larsen garage to ask Stan (Brent Sexton) if he recognizes a picture of the tattoo. He demands the return of Rosie's backpack, but after realizing Sarah doesn't even know about the backpack, he insists she leave. Sarah calls headquarters about the backpack and is told that someone took it. She finds her former boss, Michael Oakes (Garry Chalk), on his boat and asks him for the backpack. He hands her an evidence bag. At her car, she opens it to find Holder's blue backpack inside. At police headquarters, she again watches Rosie's Super 8 film as she calls Holder to leave a message saying she understands his recent actions. She is then informed that the building which houses the Beau Soleil computer servers was destroyed in a fire. At the scene of the fire, she is told there were no computers inside the building. She sees security cameras above the street and asks for footage, for which she will get a warrant later.

Stan picks up the boys at school and sees that Denny (Seth Isaac Johnson) has a box of Polish pastries. His son tells him that and says Stan's "friend" gave it to him. Stan visits Janek Kovarsky (Don Thompson) to ask him to stay away from the boys and to investigate Beau Soleil. Janek lies to Stan, telling him that Beau Soleil only uses Russian girls and that there is no record of Rosie. He also leaves a copy of Rosie's file from the morgue with Stan, saying that Rosie was alive when the car went into the water.

Outside of a Narcotics Anonymous meeting, Stephen Holder (Joel Kinnaman) chats with Claire (Sarah Strange), a fellow NA member. She goes to the meeting inside but he leaves, driving by his nephew Davie (Arien Boey) to offer him a ride, which Davie turns down, saying his mother has told him not to; both Holder and Davey seem regretful about this. Holder then visits his former drug dealer, a man named Logic (Sean Owen Roberts). They fight, and Holder leaves with a bag of methamphetamine. Sitting in his car outside an NA meeting and staring at the bag of meth, he looks up to see Claire walk out of the meeting. They later have sex in his car, after which she asks if he has any drugs.

At the hospital, Darren Richmond (Billy Campbell) tells Dr. Alex Madigan (Andrew Airlie) that he felt the warm sunlight on his legs. The doctor calls it "phantom pain" and leaves. Jamie Wright (Eric Ladin) and Richmond watch television as Mayor Lesley Adams (Tom Butler) tells reporters that Richmond's involvement in the Larsen murder remains suspicious. Neurologist Andre Newman (Sean Devine) arrives to poke Richmond's leg. Richmond feels nothing but later insists on attending a future fundraiser. Jamie promises to tell the organization that Richmond will be attending. After Richmond realizes that a nurse (Lilli Clark) has changed his urinary catheter and he did not feel it, he sticks a campaign pin into his thigh and does not feel it either. At the campaign office, Gwen Eaton (Kristin Lehman) tells her father (Alan Dale) that she wants to work for Senator Farrelly in Washington, D.C. He then makes a call on her behalf.

Driving home with son Jack (Liam James), Sarah calls to check on the security camera footage. She insists that Lt. Carlson does not need to know about the warrant. Jack picks up the Super 8 still of the Ogi Jun tattoo. He explains that Ogi Jun is a warrior avenging his murdered father. At her motel, she looks through Jack's Ogi Jun comic and sees numerous images of Ogi Jun, including one similar to the photographed tattoo. She watches footage on her computer from one of the security cameras. A Larsen delivery van appears in the video, and a close-up shows the Ogi Jun tattoo on the driver's arm. She receives a call from Claire, telling her that Holder is acting crazy. Sarah finds him pacing in a traffic median on a bridge. She tells him that she knows he switched the backpacks, convincing him to come with her. He leads her to his car, where she gets Rosie's backpack from its trunk.

A man is seen deleting Beau Soleil files off a computer, then walks out into Janek's restaurant. In the Larsen garage, a man with the Ogi Jun tattoo backs a van out.

== Production ==
Joel Kinnaman spoke about the scene between Holder and his nephew: "I really loved that scene. There were so many conflicting emotions, which is something I love to play. He has a desperation where he seeks his nephew out because he needs him. His nephew is one of the people that makes him feel like he's a good person. It makes him feel real and grounded, but at the same time he knows he's not supposed to [see him]. He's almost looking for help, but then he realizes he's using his favorite person for his own benefit, and it makes him feel ashamed. And [Arien Boey] who plays Davie is such a wonderful kid. He breaks my heart."

== Reception ==
=== Critical reception ===
"Numb" received less-than-favorable reviews. Brandon Nowalk of The A.V. Club rated this episode a C−, saying "Season two feels slightly different, less emphatic and clear-cut. It's not more complicated than season one, but it's finally reflecting that complexity in its structure." TV Fanatic’s Sean McKenna rated the episode 3 out of 5 stars, commenting "'Numb' left me feeling exactly that: numb and perhaps a little bored. The episode really took the time to focus on its characters and how each has become dazed and trapped within their own feelings of gloom and rainy depression. Although even with a setting and tone of the show that revolves around the deep seated drama, at times the hour felt like it was dipping its toes a little too deep in the melodramatic pool." Adam Vitcavage of Paste Magazine gave the episode a 7.8 rating, but commented, "The most pleasing aspect about the episode was that there was no major twists in the final moments." He added, "The Killing is changing, possibly for the better, but at this moment, it definitely needs to pick up its game." CraveOnline's William Bibbiani stated, "The questions raised by 'Numb' aren't nearly as interesting as they should be, since they were incorporated into the episode so haphazardly. Let’s call this one a wash, and hope the next episode picks up."

=== Ratings ===
The episode was watched by 1.81 million viewers and obtained a 0.6 adults 18-49 rating, which was slightly higher than the previous episode.
