= Off the Reservation =

- The Killing episode
- Episode no.: Season 2 Episode 8
- Directed by: Veena Sud
- Written by: Nathaniel Halpern
- Production code: BDH208/S208
- Original air date: May 13, 2012

Guest appearances
- Mark Moses as Lt. Erik Carlson; Patti Kim as Roberta Drays; Claudia Ferri as Nicole Jackson; Marin Ireland as Liz; Arien Boey as Davie; Q'orianka Kilcher as Mary; Nancy Sivak as Naomi

Episode chronology
← Previous "Keylela"	Next → "Sayonara, Hiawatha"
- The Killing (season 2)

"Off the Reservation" is the twenty-first episode of the American television drama series The Killing, and the eighth of its second season, and aired on May 13, 2012. The episode is written by Nathaniel Halpern and directed by showrunner Veena Sud. In the episode, Sarah Linden (Mireille Enos) frantically searches for a missing Stephen Holder (Joel Kinnaman), Stan Larsen (Brent Sexton) meets with several people regarding his reward to find his daughter's killer. and Darren Richmond (Billy Campbell) returns to work.

== Plot ==
"Off the Reservation" picks up right where "Keylela" ended. Linden calls a police dispatcher to order a search team for Holder and takes Jack (Liam James) to Holder's apartment. Jack wants her to stay and let the cops look for Holder. She receives a call to learn Lt. Carlson (Mark Moses) denied the search team. At the station, she storms into Carlson's office and warns him that if Internal Affairs finds out he did nothing while a cop died in the field, it will come back to haunt him. He tells her his officers are too busy checking out sources for the $12,000 reward Stan Larsen offered at the press conference.

Linden drives to the Indian reservation and is stopped by a road block. Casino security chief Roberta Drays (Patti Kim) appears and threatens her with a gun. Linden tells her if Linden and Holder don't make it off the reservation, the case will fall under federal jurisdiction, which trumps tribal sovereignty.

Almost immediately thereafter, Carlson arrives with a search team, telling Linden they have until dawn before the tribe's lawyers show up. Officers sweep the grounds and find Holder's Pez dispenser. While searching a nearby dump in the morning light, Linden notices a young girl, who points towards the woods (in the opposite direction from where the Pez dispenser was found). The search team is redirected, and the K-9 units pick up a scent as Wapi tribal chief Nicole Jackson (Claudia Ferri) and her lawyers meet Carlson at his car. In the woods, Holder's unconscious, battered body is found slumped against a tree.

Outside Holder's hospital room, a doctor tells Linden that Holder has several contusions and broken ribs, and is suffering from hypothermia. Linden calls her son to tell him Holder is okay. Holder's sister Liz (Marin Ireland) gives Linden a matchbook from the B.B. Hair Emporium — the matchbook that casino maid Mary gave to Holder. Liz tells her that Holder insisted on giving it to Linden, who notes the "Tomorrow 11 a.m." written on the matchbook and checks her watch.

At the Larsen house, Stan answers a phone inquiry about the reward. Tad Marek (Tim Henry) arrives to look after the Larsen boys while Stan takes care of incoming tips. He tells Stan that attention generated by the reward may not be good for the family, but Stan ignores him.

Outside the hospital, Richmond (Billy Campbell) tells the press he is relieved to be going home but ignores a reporter's question about his activities on the night of Rosie's murder. At the campaign office, Jamie (Eric Ladin) insists that Richmond tell voters where he was on that night; Richmond refuses. At the City Council chambers later, Mayor Adams (Tom Butler) reveals that he is working a deal with Jackson to obtain the waterfront property from her tribe. Richmond arrives to tell him that he knows about the doctored photo that implicated him in the murder and leaves. Visibly shaken, Adams orders Benjamin Abani (Colin Lawrence) to find out who leaked the information.

At the barber shop, Mary (Q'orianka Kilcher) tells Linden that she saw Rosie boarding the casino's elevator on the night of her murder, even though she was not scheduled to work as a maid nor hostess that night. She adds that everyone's tenth-floor keys were taken away after that. When Linden notices Mary's chapped red hands, Mary explains that Jackson insists on using cheap cleaning chemicals — the same chemicals found on Rosie's hands. Mary says Jackson controls everything on the reservation.

At the station, Stan gives Linden a notebook filled with tips, but she waves them off, adding that if he pursues the reward aspect, people will only take advantage of him. She arrives at her office to find her belongings being packed into boxes, including the evidence bag containing Rosie's keys. Carlson asks for her badge and gun, blaming her for putting them in a political mess by disobeying orders and nearly getting her partner killed, which has led to every officer's wanting retribution. She goes to Holder's apartment but is ordered out by police officers. Asking about Jack, she learns that he was gone before the cops arrived. She later finds Jack alone at Regi's vacant dock. He tells his mother that he ran when the cops pulled up, assuming they were going to take him away.

While brainstorming new campaign strategies with Jamie, Gwen (Kristin Lehman) suggests they attack the foundation of Adams' campaign, the waterfront development project, by ensuring the tribe does not give him the land. She later tells Richmond that she scheduled a meeting between him and Jackson for the next morning. He chastises her for not consulting him, and when she says they have no time he yells at her, saying that he has to face the results of his staff's bad decisions. He then blames her for telling the police about his disappearance on the night of Rosie's murder.

At the hospital, Holder wakes up to find his nephew Davie (Arien Boey) alone in the room with him. He gives Davie a gold coin to replace the one he took from him in his junkie days. Holder's phone rings repeatedly, and he finally picks up. At the airport, Linden sees Jack off on a flight to Chicago to go stay with his father. She praises his inner strength and promises to see him again soon. As she looks out the airport window, Holder arrives to say Jack called him. Holder attempts to console her.

Stan meets Naomi (Nancy Sivak), who says Rosie told her all about him and his daughter loved him. Stan is visibly moved, but Naomi reveals herself to be a medium who offers to contact Rosie for a fee. He later arrives home and ignores the messages on his answering machine.

In her car, Linden tells Holder that Rosie's key will get them onto the casino's tenth floor. "We need to get that key," she tells him. Holder does not respond as they head back to Seattle.

== Reception ==
=== Critical reception ===
"Off the Reservation" received positive reviews. Sean McKenna of TV Fanatic rated the episode 4.5 out of 5 stars, stating: "The ending was by far more quiet than last week, but it returned Holder to the stage and had the two [detectives] ready to figure out what the mysterious tenth floor is all about. Even with their differences, eccentricities, and problems, Linden and Holder make a great pair and I'm glad they are back together. And sure, even if Jackson and her crew come off as cliche bad guys, I'm glad that we've been able to add a little menace to the series. Whether or not they are truly involved in Rosie's murder is another thing, but I like the direction the show has decided to take." The A.V. Club's Brandon Nowalk rated this episode a B+, saying: "It feels like only yesterday I was prattling on about The Killing's lack of momentum, but 'Off The Reservation' opens with one of the best, most propulsive 12-minute passages of the entire series, a pulpy race through the black of early morning to find a fallen officer." Adam Vitcavage of Paste magazine gave the episode a 7.3 rating, commenting: "We're officially past the halfway point for the second season and The Killing has done a better job of feeding us pieces of information this time around than when they forced red-herring twists into the last five minutes of every episode." CraveOnline's William Bibbiani stated that, throughout the second season, the series "has done a less than stellar job of integrating its various storylines". He added, "'Off the Reservation' doesn't quite jump the shark for AMC's series, but it seems abundantly clear that The Killing has been hovering over the selachimorpha for some time now, unclear what side it wants to fall on."

=== Ratings ===
The episode was seen by 1.61 million viewers and obtained an adult 18-49 rating of 0.5, a considerable increase from the previous episode and a return to the seasonal ratings average.
