= Openings (The Killing) =

- The Killing episode
- Episode no.: Season 2 Episode 6
- Directed by: Kevin Bray
- Written by: Aaron Zelman
- Production code: BDH206/S206
- Original air date: April 29, 2012

Guest appearances
- Barclay Hope as Michael Ames; Richard Harmon as Jasper Ames; Allison Hossack as Sally Ames; Chelah Horsdal as Kellie Hopkins; Claudia Ferri as Nicole Jackson; Chelsea Ricketts as Tina; Alan Dale as Senator Eaton; Tyler Johnson as Alexi Giffords

Episode chronology
← Previous "Ghosts of the Past"	Next → "Keylela"
- The Killing (season 2)

"Openings" is the nineteenth episode of the American television drama series The Killing, and the sixth of its second season, which aired on April 29, 2012. The episode is written by Aaron Zelman and is directed by Kevin Bray. In the episode, Sarah Linden (Mireille Enos) investigates the Larsen family; Stan Larsen's (Brent Sexton) past still haunts him; Mitch Larsen (Michelle Forbes) continues to help a runaway girl (Chelsea Ricketts); and Darren Richmond (Billy Campbell) gets a surprise visitor.

== Plot ==
In Michael Ames' car, Terry Marek (Jamie Anne Allman) wants to continue the relationship that she has with him, but he (Barclay Hope) orders her to stop calling his house. She accuses him of being controlled by his wife and he grabs her, saying nobody runs his life.

Outside the Larsen garage the next day, Sarah Linden calls Stephen Holder (Joel Kinnaman) to ask him to question all the limo drivers from the ferry dock and to check Rosie's phone records. She adds that she has asked for a warrant for the Wapi Eagle Casino. Stan Larsen appears. She asks how long he has known that Rosie is not his biological daughter. He tells her that Rosie was conceived while he and Mitch were separated for a few months. He thinks that Rosie discovered the truth after looking through Mitch's keepsake box. Linden asks to look around Rosie's room. Holder calls to report that Michael Ames took a limo to the ferry on the night of the murder-and was booked on a flight to Las Vegas that same night with Terry. The detectives find Terry and ask her about Ames. She says they met at a Beau Soleil party, that he was not one of her clients, and that he canceled their Vegas trip at the last minute. Holder takes a phone call, learning that Rosie sent Ames a blackmail text in the weeks before her death, threatening to tell his wife.

At the police station, Holder notes that Ames' land development company supports Mayor Lesley Adams. Linden requests a warrant to search Ames' phone records. The detectives question Jasper Ames (Richard Harmon) at his house, who recalls seeing his father getting dropped off by a cab with a broken taillight at 4 a.m. on the night of her murder. He later confronts his father at a construction site. After telling him the police stopped by the house, Jasper demands to know what he did to Rosie. On the way back into town, Linden learns that Carlson canceled the warrants on both Ames and the casino. At the station, the detectives see Gil Sloane (Brian Markinson) leaving Carlson's office. Michael and Jasper Ames arrive with a lawyer. Jasper claims that he sent the blackmail text from Rosie's phone as a joke. The lawyer confirms that Michael took a ferry to the casino that night, but returned on a later ferry. Carlson (Mark Moses) orders the detectives to leave the Ames family alone, adding that he pulled the casino warrant because of a lack of evidence. The detectives later interrupt a party at the Ames house to question Michael's wife Sally (Allison Hossack) at her house. She tells them that her husband is allowed to sleep with other women in exchange for a prenuptial agreement in her favor. She counters their theory that Michael is Rosie's father, saying she and Michael were living in Indonesia the year Rosie was born. Outside the Ames house, the detectives see the Wapi Eagle chief at whose casino Rosie was last seen. Chief Nicole Jackson (Claudia Ferri) notices Linden's presence as she is arriving for the party. Linden suggests they tap Ames' phone, no matter what Carlson has ordered. Later at the Ames party, Jackson shakes hands with Mayor Adams (Tom Butler).

Rosie Larsen-lookalike Tina stops by Mitch Larsen's motel room and says that her boyfriend locked her out. Mitch invites her in, offers use of her shower and later suggests that Tina call her mother. Offended, Tina asks Mitch to get her clothes, which Mitch has put in the dryer for her. When Mitch returns from retrieving them, Tina is asleep. Mitch joins her in slumber, only to find upon waking that Tina has ransacked her belongings and taken her money. Mitch’s keepsake box is open, and she picks up and later reads her unmailed letter written to someone named David Rainer. The letter reveals David as Rosie's biological father.

At the hospital, Jamie Wright (Eric Ladin) helps Darren Richmond prepare for a televised interview. In Washington, D.C., Gwen Eaton (Kristin Lehman) and her new co-workers watch the televised interview. Some scoff at Richmond's chances of winning and she defends him. Later that afternoon, her senator father (Alan Dale) invites her to attend an event with him. Instead, she shows up at Richmond's hospital room and says he will never win until he detaches himself from Rosie's murder investigation. She offers to help, but he initially ignores her. Later she watches a televised Mayor Adams still talking about Richmond's possible ties to Rosie's murder. Richmond calls her to let her know she is back on his team.

Stan visits Rosie's grave. Alexi Giffords (Tyler Johnson) appears, insisting he did not hurt Rosie. He continues by describing his believed knowledge of Stan's murder of and motive for the killing of his father. Further, Alexi states that he has been stalking Stan. When Stan asks Alexi why he did not kill him, Alexi replies that he wanted to but Rosie "saved" Stan.

In her motel room, Linden finds a drawing from a previous case attached to the refrigerator door. Her son Jack (Liam James) denies putting it there, so she runs out into the hallway to look for intruders. She and Jack later show up at Holder's door and ask to spend the night at his apartment. Outside the apartment, an unidentified person watches them from a parked car.

== Reception ==
=== Critical reception ===
"Openings" received mostly positive reviews. The A.V. Club's Brandon Nowalk rated this episode a C, saying "The investigation has a clear sense of momentum as the portrait is slowly being filled in. In general, I'm pleasantly surprised by how much good is at work this year. Which is why it's disappointing to reach such a dull episode. It's not awful... It's just not remarkably good in many respects, either." William Bibbiani of CraveOnline liked the "fun, fast-moving" episode, adding: "'Openings' was a fairly involving episode of The Killing which moved the investigation and campaign forward (hurry for the latter, in particular), and touched upon some disturbing new themes that up the darkness quotient by at least half. We're entering into the final stretch, though, so the time has come to start following through." Paste Magazine's Adam Vitcavage gave the episode a 7.9 rating, commenting: "While the show relied on last-minute revelations that always seemed to be some sort of red-herring—a frequent complaint among casual fans—the show seems to have put aside the formula of trying to trick its viewers... In addition to dropping the dramatic twist endings (at least for now) the show is also doing a superb job of reintroducing characters and scenes without holding out hands. Up until now a lot of characters that had multiple-episode arcs in the first season have simply fallen off the grid. However, that is no longer the case." Sean McKenna of TV Fanatic rated the episode 4 out of 5 stars, stating "Ultimately, The Killing continues to saunter along at a slow pace, but it's certainly attempting to focus on the healing of each character as Rosie's death did more than just reveal a deeper conspiracy. When it comes down to it, everyone has a few skeletons in their closet."

=== Ratings ===
The episode was seen by 1.35 million viewers and obtained an adult 18-49 rating of 0.4, marking the series' lowest numbers to date.
