= Ghosts of the Past (The Killing) =

- The Killing episode
- Episode no.: Season 2 Episode 5
- Directed by: Ed Bianchi
- Written by: Wendy Riss
- Production code: BDH205/S205
- Original air date: April 22, 2012

Guest appearances
- Brendan Sexton III as Belko Royce; Jennifer Spence as Eve; Tyler Johnston as Alexi Giffords; Maria Marlow as Monica Krol; Mark Moses as Lt. Erik Carlson; Tahmoh Penikett as Greg Linden

Episode chronology
← Previous "Ogi Jun"	Next → "Openings"
- The Killing (season 2)

"Ghosts of the Past" is the eighteenth episode of the American television drama series The Killing, and the fifth of its second season, which aired on April 22, 2012. The episode is written by Wendy Riss and is directed by Ed Bianchi. In the episode, Detectives Linden (Mireille Enos) and Holder (Joel Kinnaman) obtain a voicemail left by Rosie Larsen (Katie Findlay) when she was alive; Mitch Larsen (Michelle Forbes) talks with a girl (Chelsea Ricketts) the same age as Rosie; and Darren Richmond (Billy Campbell) learns who may have been behind his previous arrest.

== Plot ==
After dreaming that Belko Royce (Brendan Sexton III) shoots him in his hospital bed, Darren Richmond takes it upon himself to become mobile. From his wheelchair, he watches television, stopping on a scene of someone shooting a gun. This forces him to go outside the hospital for some fresh air. There, he talks with a woman (Patricia Cullen) who is visiting her brother while he is undergoing chemotherapy. After they have a conversation about having people around who care, she points out that Richmond has urinated on himself. Meanwhile, campaign manager Jamie Wright (Eric Ladin) meets his old friend Eve (Jennifer Spence), who now works at the district attorney’s office. Knowing that this was not a social visit, she asks what he wants. Later, in Richmond’s hospital room, he tells him that the previous murder charges were based on a fake tollbooth photo, and that he believes Mayor Adams was behind it.

At the police station, Detectives Sarah Linden and Stephen Holder review their notes on Alexi Giffords (Tyler Johnston), the current suspect. She suggests they visit Monica Krol, Alexi's mother, to see if she knows of his location. At her home, they question Monica (Maria Marlow), who insists Alexi had nothing to do with Rosie Larsen's murder. She then directs them to the basement, where he is sleeping. Back at the station, Holder interrogates Alexi as Linden tells Lt. Erik Carlson (Mark Moses) that Rosie's prints were found in Alexi's apartment. He cautions her that she can only hold Alexi for eight more hours, as the department is still under scrutiny.

Linden also interrogates Alexi, sharing details of her own foster childhood. When she mentions that Rosie and her parents loved each other, he states that Rosie hated her parents. In an adjacent room with Holder, she suggests a "reverse trace" on Alexi's phone to look for any link to Rosie. When he says that they will need a warrant, she tells him to remain silent about the matter.

At the Larsen home, Stan (Brent Sexton) listens at Terry's bedroom door. He then leaves Mitch a voice mail saying he and the boys miss her. In her motel room, Mitch ignores Stan's call. She sees Tina, a teenager resembling Rosie, arguing with a man by the pool. Later in a diner, she asks Tina to join her at the table. She tells Tina she has a teenage daughter who "left." Tina tells her she cannot help find her daughter and leaves.

Stan arrives at the police station to tell Linden that he wants to give her some names of people who may have been involved with Rosie’s murder. He recognizes Alexi in the interrogation room and she urges him to leave. Later, the detectives listen as Ray, a technician, plays a message that Rosie left on Alexi's voice mail on October 5. Rosie speaks of seeing a man again and being in trouble. After playing the message for Alexi, she asks him who Rosie was scared of, but Alexi's lawyer intervenes before he can answer. They follow as the lawyer takes Alexi to Janek Kovarsky's restaurant.

While staking out the restaurant, she calls to check on her son Jack who has developed a fever. Holder tells her to go take care of her son. Upon arrival at her motel room, she finds her ex-husband Greg (Tahmoh Penikett), who says Jack had a 103-degree fever. She threatens to have him arrested, but he leaves after stating that she cares more about a dead girl than her own son. At the stakeout, Holder gets into his car and Alexi speaks to him from the back seat, ordering him to drive. Holder goes to Linden’s motel and tells her Alexi wants to talk.

Meanwhile, Stan Larsen's lawyer (Mark Burgess) informs him the attempted murder charges against Bennet Ahmed have been dropped, but that he still must go to trial for kidnapping and aggravated assault. He estimates Stan will be given a three-to-five-year jail sentence. Back home, Stan enters Terry's room and they kiss, but stop when her phone rings. He leaves and her phone rings again. Later, a dressed-up Terry waits on a street corner. A black town car pulls up, she greets the car's passenger and gets in.

In their car, Alexi tells the detectives that he originally planned to kill Rosie to avenge Stan’s killing of his father but instead grew to like her. When asked who Rosie was scared of in her voice mail, he says it was someone in a black town car they had seen at the ferry dock. Holder exits the car to place a call. Alexi tells her that Rosie had many secrets and would not tell him what she did at the casino or how she found out about her dad. Linden asks what he means, compelling him to admit that Rosie told him Stan is not her real father.

== Production ==
Regarding Terry's kiss with Stan Larsen, Jamie Anne Allman stated: "I think this is her feeling guilt about giving Rosie her ID, which she opened a bank account with, and that Rosie found out about Beau Soleil through Terry, being on her computer in her bedroom, and the guilt that she has from that. And the guilt that she has from all those things, that she wants forgiveness for the things that she’s done, and the secrets that she has...She just needs some kind of comfort. I think that’s where, for both of them, I feel like that’s what was stemming from that. And then it was awkward, because I think they both realize it was wrong, but they needed it, but it was weird."

== Reception ==
=== Critical reception ===
"Ghosts of the Past" received mixed reviews. William Bibbiani of CraveOnline called the episode "frustrating", adding: "We’re entering the final stretch with The Killing. Less than two months to go before the final revelation. Mystery series like this one are like a race, and there’s a finish line looming, so it’s clearly trying to get a second wind. But while the plot does move forward in 'Ghosts of the Past,' it loses points for style. The Killing just can’t seem to find its footing anymore, and it’s looking more and more like it won’t be able to pull itself together before the big finale." The A.V. Club's Brandon Nowalk rated this episode a C−, saying "Where 'Ogi Jun' was this focused procedural uncovering the convoluted comic-book story of the boy with the manga tattoo, lying in wait for years to exact revenge on the man who killed his father, 'Ghosts Of The Past' is dressed as a horror film without any animating purpose." Adam Vitcavage of Paste Magazine gave the episode a 7.7 rating, but commented: "'Ghosts of the Past' lived up to the episode's title. A lot of mysteries are beginning to be solved, but new ones have opened up. There are a lot of questions that were raised in the final moments. In fact, there were almost too many to begin to sift through." TV Fanatic's Sean McKenna rated the episode 4 out of 5 stars, commenting "Life is filled with its conflicts, disappointments and failures—and The Killing grips onto them with its rain soaked fingers and refuses to let go. It prefers to illustrate characters digging their way back to the top, searching for redemption and purpose amidst the never-ending hunt for Rosie's killer, even if at times the world they live in throws them another shovel to deepen their own holes."

=== Ratings ===
The episode was seen by 1.59 million viewers, marking the series' second-lowest viewership, and obtained an adult 18-49 rating of 0.6, steady with the previous week.
