= Ghosts of the Past =

Ghosts of the Past may refer to:

- Prince of Persia (2008 video game)
- "Ghosts of the Past" (The Killing), an episode of the television series The Killing
- Ghosts of the Past (album), an album by the rock band Eskimo Joe
- Ghosts of the Past (box set), a box set album by alternative rock band Starflyer 59
