= Sayonara, Hiawatha =

- The Killing episode
- Episode no.: Season 2 Episode 9
- Directed by: Phil Abraham
- Written by: Nicole Yorkin; Dawn Prestwich
- Production code: BDH209/S209
- Original air date: May 20, 2012

Guest appearances
- Mark Moses as Lt. Erik Carlson; Brian Markinson as Gil Sloane; Jonathan Cake as David Ranier; Claudia Ferri as Nicole Jackson; Patti Kim as Roberta Drays; Evan Bird as Tom Larsen; Seth Isaac Johnson as Denny Larsen; Nancy Kerr as School Principal; Tom Butler as Mayor Lesley Adams

Episode chronology
← Previous "Off the Reservation"	Next → "72 Hours"
- The Killing (season 2)

"Sayonara, Hiawatha" is the twenty-second episode of the American television drama series The Killing, and the ninth of its second season, which aired on May 20, 2012. The episode is co-written by executive producers Nicole Yorkin and Dawn Prestwich and directed by Phil Abraham. In the episode, Sarah Linden (Mireille Enos) obtains Rosie Larsen's keys, which allow access to the casino's tenth floor; Stan Larsen (Brent Sexton) learns of son Tommy's (Evan Bird) bad behavior at school; Mitch Larsen (Michelle Forbes) meets David Ranier (Jonathan Cake); and Darren Richmond (Billy Campbell) asks Nicole Jackson (Claudia Ferri) to assist the police.

== Plot ==
Stephen Holder (Joel Kinnaman) calls Linden from their office to tell her that it has been cleared out. Lt. Carlson (Mark Moses) tells Holder that the Larsen case has been transferred to County Sheriffs Office and that he is risking his career by continuing to be Linden's partner. Holder defends Linden, but Carlson tells him that she once spent a month in a psych ward after she "completely lost it" working on a case. Outside in Linden’s car, Holder calls County looking for Rosie's case files but is unable to reach anyone in Evidence. When Linden suggests they work around Gil and the County Police, Holder reminds her she is suspended. The two visit Richmond to ask him to persuade Jackson to get them access to the casino. Richmond replies that he is also not on good terms with Jackson. In the car, Linden apologizes to Holder for their separation at the reservation on the day he was assaulted. He reassures her that they are still friends and exits the car. After parking at her motel, Linden finds her son Jack's jacket in the back seat and begins to cry.

The next morning, Mitch goes to see David Rainer, Rosie's biological father. Rosie had visited him before her death. He is unaware that Rosie has since died. He tells Mitch that Rosie wanted to know more about Mitch's life. As they reflect on the past, he mentions that Rosie was planning a trip to California to see the monarch butterflies. As she leaves, he asks if Rosie is his child. Mitch lies, saying that she is Stan's.

Tommy Larsen's elementary school principal (Nancy Kerr) leaves Stan a message concerning his son. At school, he is told that Tommy stomped on a nest of baby birds and is suspended for two weeks. To no avail, Stan pleads his case about not being able to take care of his son while he is working. Outside, he yells at Tommy and takes away his house privileges, comparing his behavior to Rosie misbehaving. Tommy argues that point and says that he hates her and is glad she is dead. Stan slaps Tommy and orders the boys into the truck.

Holder finds Linden asleep in her car and tells her the case files never made it to County. Gil Sloane (Brian Markinson) later arrives at his apartment to find that Holder has ransacked it and is still there. Holder demands to know where the Larsen case files are. Gil denies knowledge. While Holder is inside, Linden takes Gil's GPS from his car. The detectives access it to find two addresses visited by Gil the previous night. Holder suggests that Gil stashed the case files at one of the locations. They arrive at a Greek restaurant, one of the addresses Gil visited. Holder recalls previously visiting the place with Gil, adding that Gil has a storage unit in the back. After finding the unit and breaking in, they find plastic bags containing the Larsen evidence and Rosie's keychain.

In a meeting with Richmond, Jackson speaks of plans to build a museum and gift shop on the waterfront, and requests tax exemption for all tribal lands in the city in exchange for her campaign backing. He responds by asking her to let the police search the casino. She refuses and he ends the negotiation. Despite Jamie's (Eric Ladin) insistence, Richmond refuses to negotiate with Jackson, saying that she only serves herself. Jamie says that the race will never be won with such a clean campaign, and Richmond later admits to Gwen (Kristin Lehman) that he is probably going to lose.

At home, Stan apologizes to his sons, both of which voice their abandonment concerns. Stan assures them they will never be alone. Mitch later calls Stan crying and saying Rosie had been planning a trip. Their daughter was leaving them.

Mayor Lesley Adams (Tom Butler) meets with Gwen, who tells him to walk away from Jackson's waterfront project. She threatens to tell her father, a key figure in Adams' political career, about an intimate moment they shared years ago. She points out that she was 14 years old at the time, but he says her father already knows. He then calls Richmond "desperate" for this latest threat from her.

At the casino, Holder and Linden realize Mary is too scared to let her into the casino through the kitchen, where she would avoid security cameras. Holder maps out the route to the elevator for Linden, who enters a side door on her own. Holder distracts the security guards by causing a commotion on the casino floor, finally leaving when Roberta Drays (Patti Kim) shows up. Linden gains access to the tenth floor construction site and calls Holder to describe what she sees. She turns on a generator and opens a sliding glass door, causing sounds identical to the background noises heard in Rosie's voice mail to Alexi. She gazes at the Seattle skyline from a balcony, deducing that Rosie was leaving town that night, came to the tenth floor to say goodbye to the city, and must have seen Michael Ames meeting with someone. Back inside, she notices a keycard from City Hall between some exposed floorboards. The card is smeared with blood. As she attempts to retrieve the card, she is knocked out from behind.

== Reception ==
=== Critical reception ===
"Sayonara, Hiawatha" received positive reviews. Sean McKenna of TV Fanatic rated the episode 4 out of 5 stars, stating that the episode "left me more bored than anything, but Linden and Holder's scenes had me captivated. So much so that the final ten minutes of finally entering the mysterious tenth floor was chock full of suspense... Sure, everyone's impacted by the death, but the real gripping, compelling, and driving force of the show remains the case and its two wonderful lead detectives." The A.V. Club's Brandon Nowalk rated this episode a B, saying "'Sayonara, Hiawatha' is a smart, restrained episode, but I can't follow suit because it's time to confess how much I love this show. This one, the muted procedural inflected with horror. It may have taken me two months, but I can't deny the careful craftsmanship, and the emotional effect has been the stronger for it." William Bibbiani of CraveOnline called the episode "the best...of The Killing so far this season". He added, "For weeks now I've been saying that for The Killing to avoid turning into an absolute debacle, the series would have to pull out all the stops in the finale. 'Sayonara, Hiawatha' is an encouraging step in that direction."

=== Ratings ===
The episode was watched by 1.31 million viewers and received an adult 18-49 rating of 0.4, marking the series' lowest numbers.
