= List of The Killing characters =

This is a list of characters from the AMC television series The Killing, which are based on the characters from the Danish crime series Forbrydelsen.

== Main characters in all seasons ==
=== Sarah Linden ===
- Mireille Enos

==== Seasons 1 and 2 ====
Sarah Linden is a detective in the Seattle Police Department, preparing to relocate to Sonoma, California, with her fiance, Rick Felder, and her teenaged son, Jack. However, her plans are put on hold when Rosie Larsen, a local high school student, disappears while her family is out of town on a camping trip. Linden's boss, Lt. Michael Oakes, partners her with Detective Stephen Holder, asking that she guide him through his first homicide case. Linden reluctantly agrees.

Linden is initially dismissive of the case, and intends on handing it over to the sex crimes division. However, upon revisiting the scene where some of Rosie's belongings were found, Linden becomes drawn to a nearby lake. There, the detectives find a submerged car with Rosie's body in the trunk. Linden becomes increasingly determined to find the killer as numerous leads go nowhere, going through several suspects.

Holder produces a photograph of Richmond driving the car that late fateful night and the man's alibi fails him. Richmond is arrested and Sarah and Jack prepare to finally leave town, but, before the plane ever leaves the ground, she receives a phone call in which she learns the photo had been doctored.

Linden takes Jack to another motel and avoids contact with Holder, whom she believes cannot be trusted. After being put back on the case, she continues to pursue more leads. Eventually she confronts Holder. He explains that he believed the photo was real, and that Gil (his narcotics anonymous sponsor) gave him the photo in order to bring down the Richmond campaign. While the two of them continue to investigate the Indian casino and the shady chief, Linden believes she is being stalked by an unknown assailant who leaves drawings on her refrigerator.

When Linden and Holder get into an argument on the island, they angrily split up to investigate. Holder gets into a confrontation with the Indian staff, who beat him up for nosing around. Linden panics when Holder doesn't return and calls a rescue team to search for Holder, who is eventually found. The two of them, determined they are getting closer to the truth, return to the casino—Holder causes a distraction while Linden sneaks up to the 10th floor, where Rosie used to take smoke breaks when she worked there. Linden discovers an unfinished construction site, where she deduces that Rosie was taking one last look at the city before leaving. Rosie then overheard someone and was most likely killed there. Linden finds a bloody keycard in the gutter but before she can reach it, she is knocked out.

She wakes up in a psychiatric hospital, where the psychiatrist tells her that the person who found her claims Linden was about to jump but was pulled back. Linden denies everything but the psychiatrist doesn't buy it, noting her past stint at a hospital in which she neglected herself and her son because she believed a previous case had actually not been closed despite an arrest. The drawing on the refrigerator turns out to be what the son of the murder victim was repeatedly drawing while he was waiting to be rescued from the room in which his mother was rotting. Holder and Felder, who turns out to be Linden's previous shrink, pull some strings to get her out of the hospital, but after this point Felder leaves Linden out of his life.

Linden and Holder return with a warrant to search the casino. Linden secretly procures the missing keycard, which opens the door into the Richmond campaign office. After obtaining the missing security camera footage from the casino, Linden sees Jamie Wright, who was present at a behind-the-scenes meeting between Ames and the Chief, in the elevator. Linden and Holder try to find Jamie but only find Gwen. They go up to Richmond's office, where Jamie has already confessed to beating Rosie and has a gun out. Holder shoots Jamie in a confrontation.

Linden breaks the news to the Larsens, where they find only Terry. Linden discovers a car with a broken taillight, indicating that her car was used the night of the murder. Terry eventually confesses she was the one who drove the car into the water with Rosie screaming in the trunk. Stan and Mitch are shocked, and Terry is arrested. With the case solved, Linden decides not to take another case after parting ways with Holder.

==== Season 3 ====
After walking away from her detective's job with the Seattle Police Department, Linden takes a job with the Vashon Island Transportation Authority, working on the ferry docks. She is asked by son Jack to move to Chicago to be closer to him, as he lives with his father, but she avoids the question. She is dating a younger man named Cody, who seems unaware of her previous career. It is a year or more since the Larsen case and three years since the previous case, which caused her to be committed. She has now accepted that Ray Seward awaits execution for killing his wife, and she appears to have moved on. Detective Holder arrives at her door to tell her a teenage girl's body has been found. The description of the body reminds Linden of the case she has put behind her. Holder cannot compare the cases, as the Seward file is missing. He leaves his current case file with her.

Linden has the Seward file in her attic. It contains the drawing of a grove of trees that Adrian Seward repeatedly drew the night his mother was killed. Linden returns the new case file to Holder, suggesting it is not the killer's first murder. Holder mentions the girl's missing rings and broken finger and asks if Seward took "trophies" as well. Linden says no and ends the conversation. She visits her old partner, James Skinner, to discuss the Seward case. She says Trisha Seward's finger was broken postmortem and her wedding ring was never found. Skinner reassures Linden that Ray Seward is guilty. At Linden's car, James's wife, Jennifer, tells her to stay away, saying that she has forgiven her husband but never wants to see Linden again. On a ferry, Cody tries to comfort Linden, but she ends their relationship.

She visits Ray Seward. He claims to have sold his wife's ring to a pawn shop but never mentions which one. When she shows him Adrian's drawing, he says he never had a son. She visits Adrian's foster home and sees him happily playing in the backyard. She notices a drawing on his bedroom wall that is identical to the drawing in the Seward case file, except that this drawing has buildings next to the grove of trees. She recognizes the buildings as the abandoned factory where the recent victim was found. Linden returns there with the new sketch and matches the trees from the drawing with a nearby grove and then makes her way through the trees to discover a pond with scattered corpses rotting in biohazard bags.

Skinner, now the head of Special Investigations, gives Linden a badge but cautions against further pursuing the Seward case. She then warns him that his wife knows about their past affair. She admits to Holder that there is a possible connection between Trisha Seward's murder and the others: Trisha's finger was broken and missing a ring, just like Kwon. At a school playground, she introduces herself to Adrian and asks if he remembers her from working on the Seward case. She asks why he added a factory to his drawing. He asks to see his dad and she agrees to look into it. The coroner estimates the bodies were in the pond for three to five years; all were killed within a six-month period. She asks if any bodies had broken fingers. He confirms some had broken and even severed fingers. While the coroner continues to try and identify the bodies, she and Holder view recently discovered pornographic tapes that had been created just before another girl disappeared.

=== Stephen Holder ===
- Joel Kinnaman

==== Seasons 1 and 2 ====
Stephen Holder overcame a difficult childhood, got a college degree, and became interested in police work, namely the Narcotics Department. While working undercover, he became addicted to methamphetamine. This affected not only his job but his family life, as he stole a prized gold coin from his nephew in order to buy drugs, although he kept it as a reminder. His boss found out about his drug use and he sought treatment, including attending Narcotics Anonymous meetings. Because of his attire and demeanor, he became successful as a detective and was promoted to the Homicide Division.

His new boss, Lt. Michael Oakes, introduces him to the outgoing homicide detective, Sarah Linden. Oakes hands them a case and asks Sarah to help him begin his career in Homicide. Her mind on leaving, along with Holder's unusual style of detective work, put the two at odds with each other, at times. The new case concerns a missing teenaged girl. When very little evidence is originally found, Sarah wants to turn the case over to the Sex Crimes division, but Holder insists on checking out a name found on an ATM card. They visit the Larsen residence and learn a teenaged girl is missing. They later find the girl's body in the trunk of a car that has been submerged in a lake. Although Holder uses his style once again with certain suspects, no arrests are made. The detectives begin to check out the car, which was originally reported stolen by City Councilman Darren Richmond's staff. After Oakes tells them they need solid proof to check out the staff, they learn that Richmond himself has no alibi for the night in question. Holder then produces a photograph of the man in the car that night. Richmond is arrested. Sarah leaves Holder to process the paperwork. Sarah later receives a phone call in which she learns the photo had been doctored. As of the end of Season One, Holder has been successful in pinning the girl's murder on Richmond.

It is revealed that his narcotics sponsor Gil Sloane has been insisting that his career will be advanced as a result of the photo. However, once Holder realizes that Richmond is innocent after all, he distances himself from Gil and tries to apologize to Linden. He nearly lapses into his old drug habit, but Linden rescues him from a downward spiral. Holder continues to assist her in the Larsen case. He is brutally beaten by Nicole Jackson’s guards when he investigates the casino without a search warrant. He helps Linden pin down Jamie Wright as a murder accomplice and later shoots Jamie in order to protect Linden.

Following Jaime's death and the arrest of Terry Marek (who was also revealed to be an accomplice), the Rosie Larsen case is brought to a definite close. He and Linden part ways, with him continuing to solve cases for the Seattle department while Linden decides to quit the force and move away.

==== Season 3 ====
Holder and new partner Detective Carl Reddick arrive at an abandoned factory, where a teenage Ashley Kwon's dead body is found wrapped in a biohazard bag. Holder mentions that her head was nearly cut off. At the morgue, the coroner estimates the dead girl's age to be 16 or 17. He also notes vaginal bruising, a broken finger, and a spinal cord nicked by a serrated edge. Reddick suggests they give the case to fellow detective Tim Jablonski. They leave after the coroner wishes Holder luck on his sergeant's exam. Jablonski agrees to take the case, although Holder is reluctant. He still needs to sign some paperwork. He visits Linden, now a transportation authority employee, at her home. He says he and Reddick have solved seven concurrent cases, improving Holder's status in the police force. He then tells her about the new murder and ponders the similarities and possible connection to Linden's old case, noting Ray Seward's case file is missing. Linden offers no help. When Holder departs, he leaves the new case file on her table. In a neighborhood where street kids hang out, Holder asks Kallie and Bullet if they have heard about the dead girl. Bullet gets angry with him and he sets her straight before leaving. At the morgue, Holder asks the coroner if Ashley had rings on her fingers. The coroner says no. Holder inspects Ashley's broken finger and compares it to a photo, provided by Ashley's parents, in which Ashley wears several rings. Later, Kallie walks down a road at night, and when a car stops she gets into the passenger seat.

After visiting the recent crime scene, Linden returns the Kwon file to Holder. They discuss the case, and she suggests it is not the killer's first murder. Holder mentions the girl's missing rings and broken finger and then asks if Ray Seward took "trophies" as well. Linden says no and ends the conversation, wishing him luck on the case. Holder later sees Bullet giving Kallie's name to the desk sergeant, who has not seen any reports about Kallie. Bullet asks Holder if he has seen Kallie and shows him a picture. At a shelter for runaways, Holder and Reddick question Pastor Mike, who has a tattoo of Ephesians 1:7 on his arm. The pastor says he last saw Ashley Kwon five days ago and mentions that kids sometimes stay at the 7 Star Motel. There, Holder and Reddick show the desk clerk a printout of photographs of some Beacon Home kids. Pointing out Ashley, Holder claims a witness saw her at the motel two nights ago. The clerk does not recognize Ashley and blames Kallie, also on the printout, for spreading misinformation. Outside, Holder remembers Bullet was looking for Kallie and suggests talking to some girls on the street, which Reddick refuses to do. Later that afternoon, Linden discovers a pond with scattered corpses rotting in biohazard bags.

Holder and Reddick become part of a task force whereby they learn more about the recent discovery: 17 bodies were found encased in biohazard bags, throats slashed or heads severed, all female teenagers. Ashley Kwon is confirmed as likely killed by the same person. It is presumed the killer may hold victims for several days before killing them. Holder mentions Kallie has recently gone missing. On a stakeout, Reddick and Holder question the driver of an arriving car as well as the teenage girl with him. The girl doesn't know Kallie but suggests they look for Bullet on an overpass. They find Bullet there, and Holder tells her they're looking for Kallie. Bullet says she heard a woman crying at pimp Goldie's apartment but warns that Goldie has a big knife. After busting into Goldie's apartment, Holder and Reddick find a television playing pornography showing a girl crying. Goldie tries to sneak out behind them, but Holder tackles him. At the station, Goldie admits to distributing child pornography and demands a lawyer when asked about Kallie. Goldie's knife does not match the murder weapon that was used on Kwon and the 17 dead girls, and he is released in hopes he will lead them to Kallie. Linden tells Holder that a possible connection exists between Trisha Seward and the other murders: Trisha's finger was broken and missing a ring, just like Kwon. Bullet finds Holder and Reddick staking out Goldie's apartment and demands to know why Goldie wasn't locked up. Holder asks if Goldie did something to her (he has raped her), but she avoids answering. Later, Goldie spots the detectives on their stakeout. At the station, officers screen Goldie's porn videos to try and match any of the girls to the bodies from the pond. A cop brings a DVD to the attention of Holder and Linden, who watch the DVD and hear a male voice ask Kallie to remove her shirt.

=== Regi Darnell ===
- Annie Corley

==== Seasons 1 and 2 ====
At a young age, Sarah Linden entered foster care and was assigned a social worker, Regi Darnell. While Sarah was placed in many different homes, Regi remained a mother-figure and friend to her. Sarah became a Seattle police detective and became so obsessed with her job that she nearly lost custody of Jack, her son. Regi stepped in to be his pseudo-baby-sitter, and Sarah was able to keep both him and her job, even though she was also a single mother. Sarah finally decides to give up her career and move with Jack to Sonoma, California, to be with her fiancé. However, Sarah becomes obsessed again with another case involving the murder of a teenaged girl, and she and her son stay longer in Seattle. Regi allows them to stay as long as necessary on her boat, which is docked in a marina.

However, Jack is entering his teenage years and soon becomes unbearable for even Regi. After she catches him smoking cigarettes and drinking beer with friends on her boat, she argues with Sarah and finally complains that she is not a baby sitter. Sarah and Jack pack up what they have and move to a motel room. Regi sets sail, away from Seattle.

==== Season 3 ====
On Regi's boat, Linden toasts Regi and her fiancée Ellen. When Regi later takes Linden some food, she finds her studying the Seward case file, in which a mother was brutally killed and Linden got too involved. Linden shows her the drawing of a grove of trees drawn by Seward's son, Adrian, and mentions a possible connection with a recent murder. Regi warns her against disrupting the child's life.

== Main characters of seasons 1 and 2 ==
=== Stanley "Stan" Larsen ===
- Brent Sexton

Stanley "Stan" Larsen, the husband of Mitch Larsen and the father of Rosie, Tommy, and Denny Larsen, is the owner of a Seattle moving company. After Rosie goes missing during the Larsen family's camping trip, Stan learns from her best friend, Sterling Fitch, that she spent the weekend with her ex-boyfriend Jasper Ames. Stan angrily confronts Jasper at his residence, but doesn't find his daughter. During his return trip to town, he stumbles across a police blockade and learns that Detective Sarah Linden retrieves Rosie's body from the trunk of a sunken car. Stan breaks down at the news.

Doubtful that the police will find the killer, the Larsens begin their own investigation into Rosie's death. Stan's friend, Belko Royce, informs him that Rosie's teacher, Bennet Ahmed, has emerged as the prime suspect. After Bennet appears at Rosie's memorial service, Stan drives him to a secluded waterfront and tries to threaten him into confessing. When Bennet denies murdering Rosie, Stan leaves him standing on the dock. Around this time, Linden and her partner, Stephen Holder, uncover details about Stan's past, mostly concerning his prior gambling habits and his ties to the Polish mob.

Linden tells Mitch that evidence has been linked to Bennet, promising her that he will soon be arrested. However, when Mitch visits Rosie's high school, she sees that Bennet still walks free. After a confrontation by Mitch, Stan and Belko kidnap Bennet and severely beat him. However, Stan's conscience leads him to stop the beating. After calling the authorities, he voluntarily goes to jail while Bennet is hospitalized.

Upon learning that Stan has spent their entire savings, Mitch confronts her husband. He admits that he has been in contact with the Polish mob. Mitch subsequently refuses to post Stan's bail, and eventually leaves him. Stan, although having plenty of opportunities to explain about buying a new home, lets her go.

The two eventually reconcile after Rosie's case is solved.

=== Mitch Larsen ===
- Michelle Forbes

Wife of Stan Larsen and mother of Rosie, Tommy, and Denny Larsen, Mitch Larsen (née Marek) grew up with dreams of seeing the world, but the Marek's family financial situation did not allow that. She eventually met and married Stan Larsen, even after knowing of his alcohol and gambling problems and his work as an enforcer in the Polish mob. When he began the Larsen Moving and Storage Company and it became successful, she became a stay-at-home mother, with the help of her sister Terry. During Rosie's high school years, the girl began to travel outside of town and the state, taking a liking to the Grand Canyon. These ventures opened Rosie's eyes to the world and she wanted to go to college out of state. Her parents were split with her decision—Mitch was in favor of it. The family planned a camping trip, but Rosie chose to stay home, in order to attend a school dance. The area they camped in was out of range for cell phone use and no one was able to keep in touch.

The police discover evidence that included Stan's ATM card, which leads them to the Larsens door. While at the residence, lead detective Sarah Linden begins asking questions about Rosie. This heightens Mitch's awareness that her daughter is missing. She and Stan discuss Rosie's circle of friends, including previous boyfriend Jasper Ames. Stan learns that Rosie may have spent the weekend with Jasper and mistakenly informs Mitch of this. After discovering he was mis-informed, he calls Mitch on the way home, only to be stopped by a police blockade. They have removed a car that had been submerged in a lake and opened its trunk. Over the phone, Mitch learns that Stan has confirmed their daughter is dead. The Larsens do not trust the detectives' promise to find the person responsible for it and begin their own investigation. Sarah shows Mitch a picture that resembles a shirt of Rosie's. She learns that Rosie's teacher, Bennet Ahmed, is a prime suspect and is promised an arrest. When that does not happen, Mitch coerces Stan into dispensing his own justice. He takes Bennet to a secluded area and severely beats him. His moral good side comes out in Stan. He stops the beating and calls 911, sending Bennet to the hospital and landing Stan in jail. Mitch learns that Stan has spent their entire savings and goes to jail to question him, when she also finds out that he has again been in contact with mob. She does not offer to post his bail, but Terry does. Mitch and Stan eventually separate, as she does not trust him and does not want to live in the house where her deceased daughter grew up. Stan, although having plenty of opportunities to explain about buying a new home, lets her go.

The two eventually reconcile after Rosie's case is solved.

=== Belko Royce ===
- Brendan Sexton III

Belko Royce is an employee of Stan Larsen's moving company, having been friends with Stan since their time working for Polish mobster, Janek Kovarsky. Belko becomes a family friend to the Larsens and assists in their investigation of Rosie Larsen's murder. Upon learning that Rosie's body was found in the stolen campaign car of Seattle mayoral candidate Darren Richmond, Belko suggests arranging a hit on the politician. Stan rebuffs the idea.

Belko's contact in Rosie's high school informs him that one of her teachers, Bennet Ahmed, has emerged as the prime suspect in the murder. Belko tells Stan, who interrogates Bennet and abandons him at a secluded waterfront. A resolute Belko is questioned by Detective Stephen Holder when Bennet briefly disappears, and threatens him with arrest if something happens to the suspect. Belko pockets Bennet's cell phone when he leaves it behind after Rosie's memorial service.

When Mitch confronts Stan over previously sparing Bennet, he has Belko accompany the teacher to a secluded area where the two men beat him. Stan turns himself in for Bennet's assault, but Belko is questioned; he denies his involvement in the crime as well as his associations with the mob. The detectives receive a call about a cab driver who picked up Rosie the night of her disappearance and learn that she went home at some point. They obtain video footage and notice that a light goes out in the supposedly empty residence as she arrives. They question Terry, who reveals that both she and Belko have keys to the residence. Belko is questioned again, and he tells them he was home with his mother, Bev, that night. When the detectives question her, they ask to see his room. On the room's ceiling, they find a collage of Larsen family photographs, most of which are of Rosie. Upon a third interrogation, Belko admits to assisting in beating Bennet, but the detectives are more concerned with Rosie's murder. He confesses to being inside the Larsen apartment when Rosie arrived, but hid because Mitch also does not like him being upstairs. Rosie left, after making another phone call. Belko's story is believed to be true.

When Darren is arrested for Rosie's murder, Belko appears outside the city jail and shoots him as he is being transported by police. Police soon also discover that Belko has killed his mother at their shared home. Darren survives the assassination attempt, but is left a paraplegic. Belko is arrested and sent to jail. During a confrontation with Stan in an interrogation room, Belko cryptically states that he "did it". Shortly afterwards, Belko holds a cop hostage in the police station before committing suicide.

=== Terry Marek ===
- Jamie Anne Allman

Stan Larsen's sister-in-law, Terry Marek is a call girl, by night, and, by day, a baby sitter of sorts for the Larsen kids. One October weekend, the Larsen family, except for Terry's teenaged niece, Rosie, goes camping. The girl is discovered murdered, and Terry makes sister Mitch feel guilty for not keeping in contact with the girl, that weekend. As the parents mourn the loss of their daughter, they begin to neglect their other two sons, to which Terry becomes a mother-figure. Both she and Mitch want a better life for themselves, which is evidenced at the memorial service the Larsens hold for Rosie. Michael Ames, a prominent Seattle man, enters with his wife and shakes hands with the family. Terry brightens and beams when he approaches her, but he coldly passes her up. Later, when Belko Royce, family friend, tells her the boys have eaten, she snaps at him for not being part of the family, then takes a bottle of wine into Rosie's room and smokes marijuana. Mitch and Terry's parents arrive and suggest to Mitch to depend on Terry more. Mitch says that Terry has her own life, at which her mother scoffs. One day, Terry calls Stan to tell him that she would be running late and cannot take the boys to school. He mentions this to Mitch, who offers. Mitch loads the boys into the car in the garage, starts the car without opening the garage door, and realizes that she has left her cell phone upstairs. She leaves the car running in the enclosed garage. Upstairs, she spots a television report that shows released photographs of the crime scene where Rosie was found and, horrified, stops to watch it. A few minutes later, Terry enters the smoke-filled garage and shuts off the car. Later, Stan thanks her for taking care of the boys while they have grieved and she tells Stan about the incident.

When Rosie is spotted on a casino ATM video the night she disappeared, the detectives learn that she has been depositing money into a bank account. The account holder is Terry. She claims to not know of such an account. When it is pointed out that Rosie would have needed Terry’s identification to open the account, she admits loaning her identification to Rosie, but only to get into a club. An undercover cop, posing as a prostitute, is shown a picture of Rosie. She says the girl looks like a high-end escort. When they check out the online escort service, they learn that Terry is the actual call girl. She tells them about an escort named Celine, who warned other escorts about a customer using that service who drove her to the waterfront and discussed drowning. The customer turns out to be city councilman Darren Richmond, who is currently running for mayor and whose campaign car was submerged with Rosie in the trunk. Richmond is arrested and charged with Rosie Larsen's murder, to which he claims innocence.

Terry is later discovered to have been the mistress of corrupt politician Michael Ames, and to have also played a key role in Rosie's death, pushing the car that had her locked in into the river, thereby drowning her (not knowing that Rosie was the girl in the trunk). The Larsens are outraged upon finding out about her involvement, and no sooner is she arrested and placed into protective custody.

=== Darren Richmond ===
- Billy Campbell

Darren Richmond is the president of the Seattle City Council, who campaigns for Mayor against incumbent Lesley Adams. During the initial campaign, Darren tries to refrain from directly attacking Mayor Adams. However, Rosie Larsen is found dead in the trunk of a stolen campaign car, and her teacher, Bennet Ahmed—member of Darren's outreach program—is suspected of her murder. The multiple connections to the crime cause Darren's poll numbers to slide, and allows Mayor Adams to accuse him of coddling criminals during a televised debate.

When Mayor Adams succeeds in having the city council freeze funding to the outreach program, Darren allows his campaign manager, Jamie Wright, to release previously-withheld evidence that Mayor Adams impregnated a nineteen-year-old intern. The scandal damages Mayor Adams and helps Darren regain his standing in the polls. When Bennet is cleared and the campaign receives a sizable donation, Darren shows renewed confidence in his electoral chances. However, a campaign intern finds a video of Darren publicly shaking hands with Rosie Larsen, whom Darren had already denied knowing.

The police uncover evidence suggesting that Rosie and her aunt, Terry Marek, were escorts. Under questioning, Terry claims that one of her customers drove to the waterfront to discuss drowning, Rosie's cause of death. Detective Sarah Linden baits this customer online, while partner Stephen Holder meets with an escort who has seen him. They both lead to Darren. The detectives also find a tollbooth photo seemingly showing Darren in the stolen car on the night of the murder, while his campaign advisor and lover, Gwen Eaton, claims that Darren had arrived home soaking wet. Despite swearing his innocence, Darren is arrested. While being transported by police, he is shot by Belko Royce, a Larsen family friend.

Darren survives the assassination attempt, but is left a paraplegic. As he recovers, Linden discovers proof that the incriminating tollbooth photo was faked and that Darren was kayaking when Rosie was killed. As a result, the district attorney drops the murder charges. Darren tells Jamie that he plans to withdraw from the mayoral race. Once getting out of the hospital however, he continues his campaign and ultimately wins the election. He is shown to be meeting regularly with Michael Ames and Nicole Jackson, hinting that he has a chance of becoming a corrupt politician like them in the near future.

=== Gwen Eaton ===
- Kristin Lehman

Gwen Eaton is the campaign advisor and secret lover of Seattle mayoral candidate Darren Richmond, helping chart his campaign against incumbent Lesley Adams. When Rosie Larsen is found dead in the trunk of a stolen campaign car, Gwen claims that Darren was with her on the night of the murder. However, a campaign intern uncovers a video showing Darren shaking hands with Rosie, whom he had already denied knowing. The police discover that Rosie may have been an escort who may have been killed by a customer.

Mayor Adams gives Gwen a package containing photographs, all showing Richmond having secret trysts with different women. Smarting from this revelation, Gwen meets with Detective Sarah Linden and changes her story, telling her that Darren had disappeared for hours on the night Rosie was last seen. Gwen also claims that he was soaking wet when he returned. Richmond is arrested for Rosie's murder, although he swears innocence. Gwen witnesses his arrest and booking, as well as his attempted assassination by Belko Royce, a Larsen family friend.

While Darren recovers from his injuries, Gwen tells Linden that he smelled of salt water when he returned on the night of the murder, indicating that he had been kayaking. When the murder charges against Darren are dropped, Gwen contacts her father, a U.S. senator, seeking a job for a Senator Farrelly in Washington, D.C.

=== Jamie Wright ===
- Eric Ladin

Jamie Wright is the manager of Darren Richmond's campaign for Mayor of Seattle. Wright is a Machiavellian but loyal staff member who urges Darren to politically exploit Rosie Larsen's murder, a suggestion shot down by Darren and his campaign advisor, Gwen Eaton. At the start of the series, Darren and Gwen suspect Jamie of leaking information about the campaign to the press. However, Jamie is absolved when another aide, planted in the campaign by a Seattle City Council member, is outed as the leak.

Darren's opponent, Mayor Lesley Adams, unsuccessfully attempts to recruit Jamie for his own campaign. When it is revealed that Rosie was found in the trunk of Darren's stolen campaign car and that a member of his outreach program is a suspect, Mayor Adams uses the information to smear Darren and freeze funding to the program. Darren permits Jamie to release information about Mayor Adams' relationship with a female intern.

Jamie also tells Gwen to keep quiet after a staff researcher stumbles upon video footage of the councilman shaking hands with Rosie at a campaign event. Jamie even claims the team is unstoppable, even after allegations surface that Richmond had numerous affairs following his wife's death. However, he asks if Richmond has any other secrets and is assured that there is nothing to worry about. Still, Richmond is arrested for the murder of Rosie Larsen.

He is later discovered to have played a key role in Rosie's death. Upon catching Rosie listening in on a conversation between him and Michael Ames about conspiring against the current governor, he knocks her out and locks her in the trunk of his car. He and Ames struggle with whether to push the car into the river, however Terry (Rosie's aunt) pushes the car in herself, effectively drowning Rosie.

Jamie is tracked down by Linden and Holder to Richmond's office, and commits suicide by cop, where he points a gun at Linden and Holder shoots him dead.

== Recurring characters of season 1 and 2 ==
=== Rosie Larsen ===
- Katie Findlay

Rosie Larsen was the 17-year-old daughter of Stan and Mitch, and sister of Tommy and Denny. She was a bright Seattle student with dreams of attending college out of Washington. According to her teacher, Bennet Ahmed, she was an "old soul trapped in a young body," meaning she was wise beyond her years. She was well-liked by her schoolmates and friends, to the point of causing mild jealousy within best friend Sterling Fitch. She had dated Jasper Ames, son of a prominent businessman, but possibly split with him when he began to try drugs. Rosie had ties to a casino where she anonymously deposited large sums of money into her aunt Terry's bank account.

One weekend, her family planned to go camping out of town and Rosie stayed home, in order to attend a school dance. The family did not keep in contact with her, since they felt she was old enough to be on her own. Rosie left the dance early, dropped a book off at Bennet Ahmed's house, went home where she received a phone call, left to meet someone at or near the casino, and was never heard from again. Her body was later found in the trunk of a submerged car that belonged to Councilman Darren Richmond's mayoral campaign staff. The only evidence found so far has been a pink bloody sweater, an ATM card belonging to her father which led the police to the Larsens, a pair of fancy high-heeled shoes, and a keychain with a casino emblem which led to the discovery of the money drops. The true nature of her death was revealed at the end of the second season. She was caught by Jamie listening in on a conversation between him and Michael Ames about a conspiracy to overthrow the current mayor. He then proceeded to knock her out, lock her in the trunk of his car, and then hours later, as he and Ames struggled to decide whether to drown her in the river or not, Terry (revealed to be Ames' mistress) pushed the car in herself.

=== Denny Larsen ===
- Seth Isaac Johnson

Denny Larsen is the 7-year-old son of Stan and Mitch, and youngest brother of Rosie and Tommy. Denny's sensitive character served to reflect the families painful struggle to maintain normalcy in the face of the devastating loss of their sister.

=== Sterling Fitch ===
- Kacey Rohl

Sterling Fitch is the best friend of Rosie Larsen. She harbors a mild jealousy of the attention that Rosie had been getting at school. The two girls attend a dance one weekend, but Rosie leaves early, allowing Sterling to wear Rosie's witch costume. Sterling never hears from Rosie again. She texts Rosie the following Monday, concerned for her safety. She tells the school principal that Rosie was with her the entire weekend, but her nose begins to bleed, which leads teacher Bennet Ahmed to suspect that she was lying. She confirms that Rosie did leave the dance early. After seeing the police at the school looking for Rosie or anyone who may know her, Sterling leaves, riding her bicycle to a downtown gathering where she finds Kris Echols. She asks about the location of Jasper Ames, Rosie's former boyfriend, thinking that Rosie could possibly be with him. Kris tells Sterling that Jasper spent the weekend at home after obtaining the drug Ecstasy and looking to have sex with someone.

When confronted by Stan, Rosie's father, Sterling tells him that Rosie is with Jasper. He discovers that is not the case and Rosie is still missing. Rosie is later found dead in the trunk of a submerged car. At the school, Bennet confiscates a cell phone which has a video recording of some teenagers having sex the night of the dance. He turns it into the police, after hearing the girl's name mentioned—Rosie. The room in the video is discovered to be attached to the school gymnasium. There are three people in the video: Jasper Ames, Kris Echols, and a costumed girl who they call "Rosie". The boys are questioned, but not suspected, as Sterling comes forward to say that it is her in the video. She wanted to experience being as popular as Rosie. Nothing further has arisen from her friendship with Rosie, nor a connection to her murder.

=== Jasper Ames ===
- Richard Harmon

Jasper Ames is the ex-boyfriend of Rosie Larsen. The reason for their breakup is unclear. Jasper is the teenaged son of Michael Ames, a wealthy Seattle land developer, particularly along the waterfront areas. The teenager is first seen when Rosie's friend, Sterling, asks Kris Echols of his location. Rosie has disappeared and is believed to be with Jasper, since, as Kris put it, he bought the drug Ecstasy and went to his family's island weekend home, "looking to 'bone' (have sex)." Jasper can be seen playing a violent video game while a naked woman, whose face is hidden, awakens in his bed. As Sterling departs from Kris, she is met by Stan Larsen, Rosie's father, who is also looking for his daughter. Sterling informs him that Rosie is with Jasper.

Stan drives to the Ames residence and, when he does not believe Jasper's admission that Rosie is not there, barges in and immediately heads to the woman in the bed. Stan sees her face and knows that it is not Rosie. On the way home, Stan is stopped by a police barricade where Rosie has been found dead in the trunk of a submerged car, which was believed stolen from Councilman Darren Richmond's mayoral campaign staff. Later at the high school, a cell phone is confiscated and given to the police. The phone contains a recorded video of Jasper and Kris having sex with a girl believed to be Rosie. It is revealed that Jasper had been previously arrested for auto theft. He is questioned but his father arrives to stop the questioning and later smacks Jasper for his recent actions. Sterling then admits to the police that it is she, not Rosie, in the video.

His father was later revealed to have played a key role in Rosie's death.

=== Kris Echols ===
- Gharrett Patrick Paon

Kris Echols is Jasper's friend, who rides a skateboard and is a tweaker. He is first seen when Rosie Larsen has disappeared and her friend, Sterling, shows up at an alley hangout to question Kris about the location of Rosie's former boyfriend, Jasper Ames. He tells her that Jasper is at the Ames' island weekend home, that he has obtained the drug Ecstasy and looking to have sex with someone, possibly Rosie.

Rosie Larsen is later found dead, and, after being questioned by police at a skate park, he finds Jasper, punches him, and accuses him of telling the police that he was at the recent Halloween dance, Rosie's last known location at the time. Later at the high school, a cell phone is confiscated and given to the police. The phone contains a recorded video of Kris and Jasper having sex with a girl, believed to be Rosie, after the dance. He is questioned again by the police, who show him the recorded video, and he asks them if that is all they have on him. At first rebellious, he softens enough to admit that he used to be a neighbor of Rosie, until his family's financial situation forced them to move. He insists that he would never harm Rosie, because she had always been nice to him. Sterling later admits to the police that it is she, not Rosie, in the video.
