= The Winner (1996 film) =

- DVD cover
- Directed by: Alex Cox
- Screenplay by: Wendy Riss
- Based on: "A Darker Purpose" by Wendy Riss
- Produced by: Ken Schwenker
- Starring: Rebecca De Mornay; Vincent D'Onofrio; Delroy Lindo; Michael Madsen; Billy Bob Thornton
- Cinematography: Denis Maloney
- Edited by: Carlos Puente
- Music by: Daniel Licht
- Production companies: MDP Worldwide; Village Roadshow Pictures-Clipsal Films Partnership
- Distributed by: Live Entertainment (US); Film Four Distributors (UK)
- Release dates: 13 September 1996 (TIFF); 25 July 1997 (United States)
- Running time: 92 minutes
- Countries: United States; Australia
- Language: English

The Winner is a 1996 film directed by Alex Cox and written by Wendy Riss based on her play A Darker Purpose.

The film was substantially re-edited by its executive producers, Mark Damon and Rebecca De Mornay, and the original score – by Cox's longtime collaborators Pray for Rain – was replaced by a jazz score. Cox requested that his name be removed from the credits.

== Plot ==
Phillip is a naive nobody with an uncanny knack for winning in a casino. Not much caring if he wins or loses, Phillip goes on a weeks-long hot streak in Las Vegas that ultimately comes to the attention of a lot of people who want his money.

Lusting after it most is Louise, a lounge singer and con artist who seduces Phillip in the Liberace museum, then lies to him that she is $150,000 in debt from medical and funeral expenses for her parents.

Her ex-husband Wolf wants a piece of the action as well. He just happens to be Phillip's brother, and is lugging around the corpse of their own dead father. Louise's current boyfriend Jack is another interested party, as is a loan shark, Kingman, and a mob hit man, Joey, who's perfectly willing to shoot innocent bystanders in the casino if it'll get him what he wants. Phillip seems helpless against them, but there may be more to him than meets the eye.

== Cast ==
- Rebecca De Mornay as Louise
- Vincent D'Onofrio as Phillip
- Richard Edson as Frankie
- Delroy Lindo as Kingman
- Michael Madsen as Wolf
- Billy Bob Thornton as Jack
- Frank Whaley as Joey
- Saverio Guerra as Paulie
- Alex Cox as Gaston

"Prospects for theatrical distribution are scanty for a film that’s meant to be quirkily comic but ultimately is more annoying than thrilling."
