= Wendy Riss Gatsiounis =

American screenwriter and producer

- Born: 1969 (age 56–57)
- Occupations: Producer, writer

Wendy Riss Gatsiounis is an American screenwriter, TV writer and producer, and playwright. Her play A Darker Purpose was produced by Naked Angels, a theater company in New York, with Fisher Stevens as the star. She later adapted the play for film as The Winner (1996), which starred Vincent D'Onofrio and Billy Bob Thornton and was directed by Alex Cox. She wrote for The Killing on AMC and Reign on The CW. She was a writer and executive producer for the second season of the show Genius, about the life of Pablo Picasso, on National Geographic, for which she was nominated for an Emmy. She was a co-executive producer on Yellowstone on Paramount Network. She currently serves as a writer and executive producer on Mayor of Kingstown on Paramount+, and Women in Blue on Apple TV.

In November 2017 in response to #MeToo, Riss Gatsiounis was one of seven women to publicly accuse Dustin Hoffman of sexual misconduct. She accused Hoffman of sexually harassing her in 1991 after expressing interest in having her adapt her play as a movie for him to star in and inviting her to pitch her play A Darker Purpose.
