= Eliza Clark (American writer) =

American actress and playwright

- Occupations: Actress, playwright, screenwriter
- Spouse: Zack Whedon (m. 2012)

Eliza Clark is an American actress and writer.

== Career ==
She has acted in minor parts in movies and commercials. On August 29, 1990, she briefly played Jessica Buchanan on the soap opera One Life to Live.

Clark has also directed many productions at Yale University since September 2003, including Wendy Wasserstein's Uncommon Women and Others, Rebecca Gilman's The Glory of Living and Wendy MacLeod's House of Yes. She is also a playwright; her play, The Metaphysics of Breakfast, appeared in the 2005 New York Fringe Festival. She is a member of Youngblood at the Ensemble Studio Theatre, which is a collective of professional playwrights. She wrote for and performed in the web sitcom, Inconvenient Molly.

Her plays have appeared at Provincetown Playhouse, and in the Yale Playwrights Festival at the Yale Repertory Theater, for three years in a row: "The Metaphysics of Breakfast" (2005), "Hiccup" (2006), and "Puppy." Her most recent play, "Edgewise" performed at the Cherry Lane Theater in New York City in August 2008. She was the recipient of the 2010 P73 playwriting fellowship from Page 73 Productions.

In 2010, she was on the writing staff of the AMC series Rubicon. In 2016-2019, she was producer of the TNT series Animal Kingdom and writer of 11 episodes. In 2021, she was the showrunner for the FX series Y: The Last Man based on the comic book series of the same name by Brian K. Vaughan and Pia Guerra. In October 2021, the series was canceled after one season.

== Personal life ==
In 2012, Clark married screenwriter and film director Zack Whedon. The two met while writing for Rubicon.

| Preceded by Alex and Brittany Smith | Jessica Buchanan on One Life to Live; 1990 | Succeeded by Erin Torpey |
