= Annie Corley =

American actress (born 1960)

- Born: Ann Parr Corley; January 11, 1960 (age 66); Lafayette, Indiana, U.S.
- Education: DePauw University
- Occupation: Actress
- Years active: 1990–2017

Ann Parr "Annie" Corley (born January 11, 1960) is an American actress who has appeared in a wide variety of films and television shows since 1990. She may be best known for playing the daughter of Meryl Streep's character in the 1995 film The Bridges of Madison County.

== Biography ==
Born on January 11, 1960, in the Home Hospital in Lafayette, Indiana, Corley is the older of two children born to Purdue University alumni Sarah Parr (née Myers) and Melvin Dale Corley, a Lafayette-based civil engineer, developer and realtor. When they divorced in 1975, custody of both children was awarded to Sarah Corley, who subsequently worked for Eli Lilly and Company as a scientific librarian.

Corley's desire to act was ignited in the seventh grade, when she played Snoopy in a student production of the musical You're a Good Man, Charlie Brown, at Southwestern Junior High School in Lafayette. While attending McCutcheon High School, she appeared in productions of Gypsy, South Pacific, and Annie Get Your Gun. She also excelled as a member of the Speech club, and, at the time of her graduation in 1978, was one of two students named co-salutatorian in a class of 248.

Corley graduated from DePauw University in 1982, majoring in communication and participating in student theatrical productions. She studied at the Actors Studio during a one-semester program in New York City while she was enrolled at DePauw. Her work at the Actors Studio enabled her to study at the Lee Strasberg Theatre and Film Institute, and she returned there on a scholarship in the following summer.

After graduating from DePauw, Corley moved to New York City, supporting herself for seven years as first a waitress and later a cook at an Upper West Side restaurant. Eventually she found some acting work in commercials and in plays that were far removed from Broadway. She became a member of Actors Studio, and an agent who saw her in a play there helped her obtain parts on television shows. When critic John Simon wrote that her 14-minute monologue in an off-Broadway production of Raft of the Medusa was "nothing short of extraordinary", her opportunities for performing increased further.

She first appeared in Malcolm X. Since then, she has been featured in several other Oscar-nominated films, such as The Cider House Rules, Seabiscuit, 21 Grams, and Monster. She co-starred in The Lucky Ones and in 2009 appeared in Crazy Heart and Law Abiding Citizen.

Among her television appearances, she has guest starred on The Closer, NYPD Blue, as the mother of Zachary Quinto on Touched by an Angel, conservative Christian pundit Mary Marsh on The West Wing, Without a Trace, Murder, She Wrote, CSI: Crime Scene Investigation and The Practice.

Corley has made commercials for Lemon Joy and Stove Top stuffing.

== Filmography ==
Film
Year	Title	Role	Notes
1992	Malcolm X	TV Reporter	
1995	The Bridges of Madison County	Carolyn Johnson	
1996	Box of Moonlight	Deb Fountain	
1997	Free Willy 3: The Rescue	Drew Halbert	
1999	Last Chance	Polly	
1999	The Cider House Rules	Carla	
2000	If Only You Knew	Joanne	
2000	Here on Earth	Betsy Arnold	
2000	Forever Lulu	Millie Ellsworth	
2002	Juwanna Mann	Coach Rivers	
2003	Seabiscuit	Mrs. Pollard	
2003	21 Grams	Trish	
2003	Monster	Donna	
2006	Stick It	Officer Ferguson	
2008	The Lucky Ones	Jeanie Klinger	
2009	The Answer Man	Mrs. Gold	
2009	Law Abiding Citizen	Judge Laura Burch	
2009	Crazy Heart	Donna (uncredited)	
2010	Faster	Mother	

Television
Year	Title	Role	Notes
1989	All My Children	Nurse Fletcher	1 episode
1990	Law & Order	Stewart	Episode: "Prescription for Death"
1990	Monsters		Episode: "The Family Man"
1992	The President's Child	Myra Kelsey	TV movie
1993	L.A. Law	Phyllis Wodjack	Episode: "Hello and Goodbye"
1993	Empty Nest	Anita	Episode: "Mother Dearest"
1993	The Tommyknockers	Marie Brown	TV miniseries
1994	Pointman	Judge Helen Pappas	TV movie
1994	Children of the Dark	Susan	TV movie
1994	A Time to Heal		TV movie
1994	Beyond Betrayal	Iris McKay	TV movie
1995	Murder, She Wrote	Liz White	Episode: "Twice Dead"
1995	Pointman	Judge Helen Pappas	Episode: "Judgment Day"
1997	NYPD Blue	Sherrie Egan	Episode: "Lost Israel: Part 1"; Episode: "Lost Israel: Part 2"
1997	The Practice	Doctor	Episode: "Save the Mule"
1998	To Have & to Hold	Mrs. Maloeny	Episode: "Tangled Up in You"
1999	The '60s	Mary Herlihy	TV movie
1999	The Practice	Lindsay's Doctor	Episode: "Happily Ever After"
1999	The West Wing	Mary Marsh	Episode: "Pilot"
2000	The West Wing	Mary Marsh	Episode: "Shibboleth"
2001	Strong Medicine	Teresa 'Father Terrence' Valentine	Episode: "Drugstore Cowgirl"
2001	The Agency		Episode: "A Slight Case of Anthrax"
2001	Touched by an Angel		Episode: "When Sunny Gets Blue"
2002	The Pennsylvania Miners' Story	Annette Fogle	TV movie
2004	Without a Trace	Nancy	Episode: "Hawks and Handsaws"
2004	NCIS	Deputy Secretary of State Anna Elliot	Episode: "Chained"
2005	CSI: Crime Scene Investigation	Nurse Joanne McKay	Episode: "Committed"
2005	Law & Order	Christine Hill	Episode: "Acid"
2006	Crossing Jordan	Frances Murphy	Episode: "Loves Me Not"
2009	The Closer	Mrs. Sara Dobson	Episode: "Smells Like Murder"
2010	CSI: Miami	Joanne Connors	Episode: "Manhunt"
2011–2014	The Killing	Regi Darnell	15 episodes
2012	Blue Eyed Butcher		TV movie
2017	Law & Order: Special Victims Unit	Rosemary Taylor	Episode: "Unintended Consequences"
