= Colin Lawrence =

British actor

- Born: London, England
- Occupation: Actor
- Years active: 1995–present
- Spouse: Lucia Walters
- Children: 2

Colin Lawrence is an English actor known for his roles in film and television. He is best known for playing John 'Preacher' Middleton in the Netflix series Virgin River.

== Early life ==
Lawrence was born in London and raised in Vancouver, British Columbia, Canada. He is of Jamaican descent.

== Career ==
Since 1995, he has participated in many TV series, either as a guest star or in recurring roles.

From 2006 to 2009, he gained recognition as Hamish "Skulls" McCall on the rebooted Battlestar Galactica TV series. In the TV series Blade (2006) he was the protagonist's father. In the TV series Endgame (2011) he appeared as detective Jason Evans. In 2011 and 2012, he appeared in 12 episodes as Benjamin Abani on The Killing. He has also appeared in recurring roles as Janko in The CW series iZombie, as Damien in the TV Land sitcom Impastor, and as Coach Clayton in The CW series Riverdale. Since 2019, he has played the main character John "Preacher" Middleton in the Netflix series Virgin River.

Besides his career as a TV actor he also appeared in many feature films, including Afghan Knights and Watchmen.

== Personal life ==
Lawrence married Lucia Walters in 1999 and they have two daughters.

== Filmography ==
=== Film ===
Year	Title	Role	Notes
1995	Slam Dunk Ernest	Tommy T.	Direct-to-video
1999	Y2K	Gumball	
2000	Epicenter	Driver	
2000	The 6th Day	Security Guard	
2001	Head over Heels	Officer Jones	
2002	Black Point	Patrolman	
2003	House of the Dead	G	
2003	Dreamcatcher	Edwards	
2003	X2	Stryker Soldier	
2004	The Thing Below	Dixon	Direct-to-video
2004	Ripper 2: Letter from Within	Roberto Edwards	
2004	Part of the Game	Marcus	
2005	Missing in America	Young Jake	
2005	Fantastic Four	NYPD Bridge Cop 2	
2005	Sub Zero	Pete Tanner	Direct-to-video
2005	Severed	Arnold	
2006	Hollow Man 2	Capt. Rollins	Direct-to-video
2006	Crossed	Tyrone	
2007	Afghan Knights	JT	
2009	Watchmen	Officer Kirkpatrick	
2009	Driven to Kill	Police Officer #2	
2009	Case 39	Police Sergeant	
2010	Lullaby for Pi	Jack	
2013	Kill for Me	Detective Howe	Direct-to-video
2013	12 Rounds 2: Reloaded	Jay	
2017	Rememory	Det. Mike Buckland	
2017	Fifty Shades Darker	Penthouse Restaurant Customer	

=== Television ===
Year	Title	Role	Notes
1995	She Stood Alone: The Tailhook Scandal	Hawk	Television film
1995	Strange Luck	Stokes	Episode: "Blind Man's Bluff"
1996, 1997	The Sentinel	Ray	2 episodes
1996–1998	The X-Files	Various roles	3 episodes
1997	Poltergeist: The Legacy	Paramedic #1	Episode: "The New Guard"
1997	The Outer Limits	Technician	Episode: "A Special Edition"
1997	Unwed Father	State Trooper	Television film
1997	Medusa's Child	PAX Naval Base Controller	Television film
1997–2002	Stargate SG-1	Various roles	5 episodes
1998	Outrage	Captain	Television film
1998	Viper	Karl Mathers	Episode: "Double Team"
1998	Silencing Mary	Augie	Television film
1998	Creature	Communications Officer	2 episodes
1998	Atomic Train	Steve Monroe	2 episodes
1999	Heaven's Fire	Bobby	Television film
1999	Hayley Wagner, Star	Mr. Altree	Television film
1999	As Time Runs Out	Officer	Television film
1999	First Wave	Terrence	Episode: "Night Falls"
1999	The Wonder Cabinet	FBI-Colquitt	Television film
2000	Seven Days	Lamar Pitts / FBI Lead Agent	2 episodes
2000	Secret Agent Man	Exo	Episode: "Sleepers"
2000	Hollywood Off-Ramp	Luther	Episode: "Judgement Day"
2000	Final Ascent	Agent Matthews	Television film
2001	Dark Angel	O'Neill	3 episodes
2001	Wolf Lake	Robinson	Episode: "Soup to Nuts"
2002	Just Cause	Sharpe	Episode: "Pilot: Part 2"
2002	The Twilight Zone	Daniel Barrett	Episode: "Cradle of Darkness"
2002	Saint Sinner	Steve	Television film
2003	Andromeda	1st Renegade	Episode: "What Happens to a Rev Deferred?"
2003	Dead Like Me	Businessman	Episode: "Dead Girl Walking"
2003	Jeremiah	Team Leader	2 episodes
2004	The Survivors Club	Sheriff Bellows	Television film
2004	Proof of the Man	Mario	Miniseries
2004–2006	The L Word	David Waters	4 episodes
2004, 2005, 2009	Smallville	Various roles	3 episodes
2005	Romeo!	Darius Crippen	Episode: "Hits and Misses"
2005	The 4400	Dan Kendrick	Episode: "Weight of the World"
2005	Third Man Out	Cole	Television film
2005	Premonition	Agent Boston	Television film
2005	Chasing Christmas	Present Trainee	Television film
2006	Augusta, Gone	Will	Television film
2006	Blade: The Series	Young Robert Brooks	2 episodes
2006	Saved	Michael	Episode: "Tango"
2006	To Have and to Hold	Det. McKenna	Television film
2006–2009	Battlestar Galactica	Hamish 'Skulls' McCall	13 episodes
2006, 2009, 2016	Supernatural	Various roles	3 episodes
2007	It Was One of Us	Tom	Television film
2008	Paparazzi Princess: The Paris Hilton Story	L.A.P.D. Officer #1	Television film
2008	Men in Trees	Slick Announcer Guy	Episode: "Surprise, Surprise"
2008	Past Lies	Goodwin	Television film
2009	Trust	Detective #1	Television film
2009	Children of the Gods	Warren	Television film
2009	Phantom Racer	Deputy Jackson	Television film
2009	Sanctuary	Scofield	Episode: "Veritas"
2010	Stonehenge Apocalypse	Pilot	Television film
2010	Concrete Canyons	Hanley	Television film
2010	Human Target	Delgado	Episode: "Dead Head"
2011	Fairly Legal	Lawyer Buddy	Episode: "Bridges"
2011	Endgame	Det. Jason Evans	6 episodes
2011	Fringe	Agent Roach	Episode: "Neither Here Nor There"
2011–2012	The Killing	Benjamin Abani	12 episodes
2012	Alcatraz	J.T.	Episode: "Guy Hastings"
2012	Continuum	Sergeant / Leader	2 episodes
2012	Smart Cookies	Troy	Television film
2012	A Mother's Nightmare	Coach Brody	Television film
2012	Hitched for the Holidays	Patrick	Television film
2012	Beauty and the Beast: A Dark Tale	Yanta Mho	Television film
2013	Arrow	Paul Knox	Episode: "Trust But Verify"
2013	Twist of Faith	Mike Jones	Television film
2013	Eve of Destruction	David Jackson	2 episodes
2013	Cedar Cove	Instructor	Episode: "Cedar Cove: The Beginning"
2013	Lost Girl	Marcus	Episode: "Of All the Gin Joints"
2014	The 100	Rivo / Grounder Warrior	2 episodes
2015	Motive	Doug Grey	Episode: "Calling the Shots"
2015	Minority Report	Hamilton Vega	2 episodes
2015	Angels in the Snow	Joe Tucker	Television film
2015–2016	Impastor	Damien Westbrook	5 episodes
2016	iZombie	Janko	6 episodes
2016	Dead of Summer	Joel's Dad	2 episodes
2016	Betrayed	Cat Eyes	Episode: "No Escape"
2016	Mr. Write	Tim	Television film
2016	Shut Eye	Denny	2 episodes
2016	The Man in the High Castle	Boat Captain	Episode: "The Tiger's Cave"
2016, 2018	Girlfriends' Guide to Divorce	DJ	2 episodes
2017	Framed for Murder: A Fixer Upper Mystery	Chief Jensen	Television film
2017	Beaches	Bryan	Television film
2017	Timeless	State Trooper	Episode: "Karma Chameleon"
2017	The Arrangement	Brandon Drake	Episode: "Crashing"
2017	Concrete Evidence: A Fixer Upper Mystery	Chief Jensen	Television film
2017	Somewhere Between	Barnes	3 episodes
2017–2019	Riverdale	Coach Clayton	6 episodes
2018	Taken	Terry Hicks	Episode: "Quarry"
2018	Deadly Deed: A Fixer Upper Mystery	Chief Jensen	Television film
2018	ReBoot: The Guardian Code	Mr. Davies	2 episodes
2018	Colony	Resistance Sentry	3 episodes
2018	The Bletchley Circle: San Francisco	Marcus Bearden	5 episodes
2018	Take Two	Jay Elder	2 episodes
2018	Christmas in Evergreen: Letters to Santa	Thomas Tucker	Television film
2018, 2019	The Good Doctor	Clifton	2 episodes
2019	Mystery 101	Sebastian Dusquenes	Episode: "Playing Dead"
2019	Christmas in Evergreen: Tidings of Joy	Thomas Tucker	Television film
2019–Present	Virgin River	John 'Preacher' Middleton	42 episodes
2020	Christmas in Evergreen: Bells are Ringing	Thomas Tucker	Television film
2021	Morning Show Mysteries	Tyrell Price	Episode: "Murder After All"
2021	Dancing Through the Snow	Michael Foster	Television film
2023	Napa Ever After	Alec	Television film
