= Eric Ladin =

American actor (born 1978)

- Born: February 16, 1978 (age 48); Houston, Texas, U.S.
- Occupations: Actor, voice actor
- Years active: 2001–present
- Spouse: Katy Ladin
- Children: 2

Eric Ladin (born February 16, 1978) is an American actor.

== Early life and education ==
Eric Ladin was born into a Jewish family in Houston, Texas, and graduated from The Kinkaid School in 1998. He later studied at the USC School of Dramatic Arts.

== Career ==
Ladin has guest-starred as William Hofstadt on episodes of the AMC show Mad Men and the HBO miniseries Generation Kill as Corporal James Chaffin. He has appeared in the films Toolbox Murders, Cursed and Left in Darkness. He is also the voice of the character Ellis in Left 4 Dead 2, as well as the voice of Cole MacGrath, the lead character of Infamous, in all media beginning with Infamous 2.

Ladin played Jamie Wright for two seasons in AMC's The Killing. He guest-starred in the Law & Order: Special Victims Unit episode "Rhodium Nights". He is the voice of Private Todd Kashima in Call of Duty: Infinite Warfare.

He played J. Edgar Hoover in HBO's series Boardwalk Empire.

In 2019 and 2020 Ladin appeared as Gene Kranz on the Apple TV+ series For All Mankind and Chris Kraft on the Disney+ series The Right Stuff, both characters being NASA space flight directors. Ladin has a recurring role as Los Angeles Times reporter Scott Anderson on the Amazon series Bosch.

In 2020, Ladin starred in the feature psychological thriller film Painter with Betsy Randle.

== Personal life ==
Ladin is married to fashion designer and stylist Katy Ladin. The couple have two sons.

== Filmography ==
=== Films ===
Year	Title	Role	Notes
2004	Toolbox Murders	Johnny Turnbull	
2005	Cursed	Louie	
2005	Duck	Addict #4	
2006	Left in Darkness	Gopher	
2008	Bar Starz	Cory Lemuixk	
2008	My Best Friend's Girl	Clay	
2009	Back Nine	Gary Sussman	
2013	Highland Park	Jessie	
2014	Annabelle	Detective Clarkin	
2014	River Guard	Sean Flynn	
2014	American Sniper	Squirrel	
2015	The Missing Girl	Skippy	
2016	Beyond Valkyrie: Dawn of the 4th Reich	Robert Sites	
2016	Rebirth	Todd	
2016	Wolves at the Door	Detective Clarkin	
2017	Scooby-Doo! Shaggy's Showdown	Kyle	Voice, direct-to-video
2018	The Phantom Menace	Jim	Short film
2020	Painter	Aldis	Indie film
2022	Where the Crawdads Sing	Eric Chastain	

=== Television ===
Year	Title	Role	Notes
2001	Boston Public	Johnson	Episode: "Chapter Eighteen"
2002	The Nick Cannon Show	Cadet	Episode: "Nick Takes Over the Law"
2003	CSI: Miami	Jeff Wilton	Episode: "Grave Young Men"
2003	NCIS	P.O. Thompson	Episode: "Sub Rosa"
2005	ER	Pvt. Perry	Episode: "Here and There"
2005	Cold Case	Crumbs (1945)	Episode: "Colors"
2005	Surface	George Owen	4 episodes
2006	E-Ring	Sgt. Michael Polard	Episode: "Brothers in Arms"
2007	Shark	Ronald Harper	Episode: "Starlet Fever"
2007	The Unit	Blaylock	Episode: "Dark of the Moon"
2007	Veronica Mars	Derrick's Brother	Episode: "Un-American Graffiti"
2008	Generation Kill	Corporal James Chaffin	7 episodes
2008	Bones	Paul Stegman	Episode: The Con Man in the Meth Lab"
2008	Hawthorne	Corporal Sharp	Episode: "Pilot"
2008–2009	Mad Men	William Hofstadt	4 episodes
2009	The Mentalist	Roddy Gerber	Episode: "Black Gold and Red Blood"
2010	Big Love	Dr. Roquet Walker	3 episodes
2010	CSI: Crime Scene Investigation	Delf Rod	Episode: "Take My Life, Please"
2010	Criminal Minds	Joshua Beardsley	Episode: "Exit Wounds"
2010	Miami Medical	Brad	Episode: "An Arm and a Leg"
2010	Dark Blue	Glenn Fischer	Episode: "Brother's Keeper"
2010	The Defenders	Dan Shepard	Episode: "Pilot"
2010	Fish Hooks	Ron	Voice, episode: "The Tale of Sir Oscar Fish"
2011	Suits	Wyatt	Episode: "Errors and Omission"
2011	Castle	Daniel Sulliven	Episode: "Heartbreak Hotel"
2011–2012	The Killing	Jamie Wright	26 episodes
2012	Justified	Wally Beckett	Episode: "Harlan Roulette"
2012	Law & Order: Special Victims Unit	Clayton Hannigan	Episode: "Rhodium Nights"
2012	Motorcity	Red	Voice, 3 episodes
2012–2013	Noodling	Narrator	18 episodes
2013	Dexter	Dr. Turner	Episode: "Remember the Monsters?"
2013	NCIS: Los Angeles	William Garrett	Episode: "Unwritten Rule"
2013	Grey's Anatomy	Victor Brown	Episode: "Thriller"
2013	Boardwalk Empire	J. Edgar Hoover	6 episodes
2014	Interrogations Gone Wrong	Himself	Funny or Die sketch
2015	The Brink	Lt. Glenn Taylor	Main role
2016	Pickle and Peanut	Oily Dan	Voice, episode: "Parking Lot Carnival"
2016	Lucifer	Liam Pickering	Episode: "Liar, Liar, Slutty Dress on Fire"
2016	Avengers Assemble	Ironclad	Voice, episode: "U-Foes"
2016–2017	Longmire	Sawyer Crane	4 episodes
2017	Rosewood	Ivan Keller	Episode: "Clavicle Trauma & Closure"
2017	Doubt	Rodney Hill	Episode: "Not a Word"
2017	Lethal Weapon	Gordon Barnes	Episode: "El Gringo Loco"
2017–2020	Bosch	Scott Anderson	11 episodes
2018	Six	Trevor Wozniak	Main role
2018	Shooter	Red Bama Jr.	5 episodes
2019	Impulse	Ethan Fisher	6 episodes
2019	For All Mankind	Gene Kranz	6 episodes
2020	The Right Stuff	Christopher C. Kraft Jr.	8 episodes
2022	Ozark	Kerry Stone	3 episodes
2022	The Cleaning Lady	Noah	2 episodes
2023	The Rookie: Feds	Special Agent Tom Mathis	Episode: "Red One"

=== Video games ===
Year	Title	Role	Notes
2009	Left 4 Dead 2	Ellis	
2011	inFAMOUS 2	Cole MacGrath	
2011	inFAMOUS: Festival of Blood	Cole MacGrath	
2012	PlayStation All-Stars Battle Royale	Cole MacGrath	
2013	Resident Evil 6	Ellis	
2016	Call of Duty: Infinite Warfare	Private Todd "Kash" Kashima	
