= Orpheus (Stargate SG-1) =

- Stargate SG-1 episode
- Episode no.: Season 7 Episode 4
- Directed by: Peter DeLuise
- Written by: Peter DeLuise
- Cinematography by: Peter Woeste
- Editing by: Brad Rines
- Production code: P268
- Original air date: June 27, 2003

Guest appearances
- Teryl Rothery as Dr. Janet Fraiser; Tony Amendola as Bra'tac; Obi Ndefo as Rak'nor; Neil Denis as Rya'c; David Richmond-Peck as Jaffa Commander

Episode chronology
← Previous "Fragile Balance"	Next → "Revisions"
- Stargate SG-1 (season 7)

"Orpheus" is the 4th episode from the seventh season of military science fiction adventure television show Stargate SG-1 and is the 136th overall. It was first broadcast on June 27, 2003, on the Sci-Fi Channel. The episode was written and directed by Peter DeLuise.

In this episode, following one of SG-1's missions to another world through the Stargate, Teal'c (Christopher Judge) is seriously injured. No longer able to rely on the healing powers of his symbiote, Teal'c struggles with his rehabilitation and believes he has become weak. Meanwhile, Daniel Jackson (Michael Shanks) is struggling to piece together memories from his time as ascended being but fears that Teal'c's son Rya'c and mentor Bra'tac are in trouble.

The episode deals with the repercussions of the season six episode "The Changeling", which sees Teal'c lose his symbiote.

== Plot ==
SG-1, who have been on a mission off-world, have dialed the Stargate to Earth and advised General Hammond (Don S. Davis) that they're under attack and are preparing to retreat through the gate to Stargate Command. Personnel in the gate room brace themselves, as Samantha Carter (Amanda Tapping), Daniel Jackson (Michael Shanks) and then Jack O'Neill (Richard Dean Anderson) all rush out of the gate. Teal'c (Christopher Judge) is the last to arrive, but before Stargate's iris is closed and able to prevent their attackers from following, an enemy Jaffa soldier manages to come through and before being killed is able to shoot Teal'c.

Teal'c wakes up in the infirmary where Dr. Fraiser (Teryl Rothery) informs him that he was shot directly where his Goa'uld symbiote once was and as a result has suffered spinal damage. After Daniel visits a taciturn Teal'c, who is reluctant to talk. As Daniel leaves the infirmary he hears mysterious voices. Some time later, Teal'c trains for his recovery while Daniel and Sam work out. They notice that Teal'c is rigorously training, perhaps too much, but he ignores their concerns. After making a full recovery, Teal’c begins to train more than ever, yet remains uncharacteristically taciturn. In the meantime, Sam and Daniel look over Stargate addresses because Daniel feels an inclination to recover a lost memory. He only knows it's connected with the wormhole generated by the Stargate. When he and Jack visit Teal'c, he finally reveals that his reticent attitude is due to a weakness felt due to use of the Tretonin, and his teammates can offer no consolation.

To help himself remember, Daniel asks Teal'c to teach him Kelno'reem, a Jaffa meditation which aids in uncovering a memory regarding Rya'c (Neil Denis) and Bra'tac (Tony Amendola) who, together with other Jaffa, are working as slaves on an unknown world. Because Teal'c has no knowledge of this place, SG-1 contacts Rak'nor (Obi Ndefo) to assist in their plight. In the meantime, Rya'c and Bra'tac witness an execution, at the hands of a Goa'uld serving Jaffa Commander (David Richmond-Peck), of several slaves too weak to work. At Stargate Command, Rak'nor identifies the planet as Erebus, a world controlled by the Goa'uld System Lord Ba'al where prisoners are forced to mine materials for the construction of Goa'uld Ha'tak motherships. Rak'nor also tells them that Erebus' Stargate is protected by an energy shield, which Daniel recalls how to penetrate in another visions.

SG-1 along with Rak'nor and other Stargate Command forces embark on a rescue mission to Erebus, securing a position on a hillside looking down into the labor camp. During the night, Teal'c and Rak'nor sneak into the camp but are betrayed, captured, and tortured. The rest of SG-1, unable to do anything, decide to create a diversion. Sam and Daniel use a Ring Transporter to gain access to the nearby Ha'tak, which is under construction to place C-4, but cannot get to the Ring Transporter, which is under heavy guard. In the meantime, Teal'c enlightens Bra'tac and Rya'c about their plans to flee and the word is spread among the fellow Jaffa held prisoner in the camp. Rya'c is caught spreading the word by the prison guards, and is scheduled for execution when Teal'c begs to take his place. However, before he is killed, the C-4 explodes, plunging the mothership to the ground. The Jaffa Commander swiftly orders his Jaffa to the ship when they are deftly ambushed by the SG teams. As the Jaffa slaves rebel against their captors, Teal'c is able to kill the Jaffa Commander, and SG-1 and their allies take control of the camp before returning to Stargate Command. As Teal'c and Daniel meditate together they agree that for the first time they feel that they are involved in something important and that they belong in the Stargate Command.

== Production ==
=== Development and writing ===
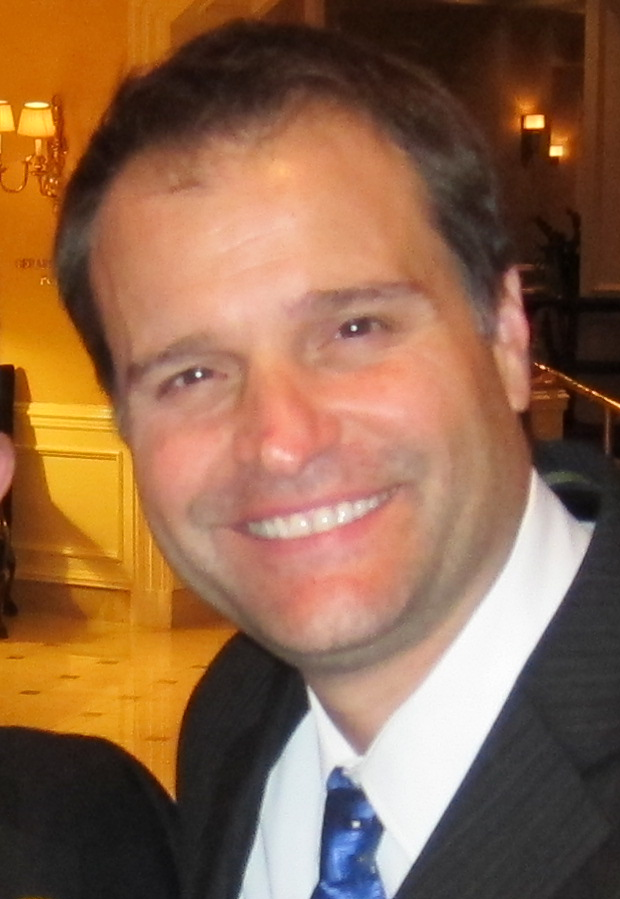
Peter DeLuise wrote and directed the episode

In the season seven opening episode, "Fallen", Dr. Daniel Jackson, portrayed by Michael Shanks returned to the show as a main character, having been reduced to a reoccurring role in season six. With the character having died and ascended to a high plain of existence in the season five episode "Meridian", he is ultimately "cast out" by the other ascended beings following his attempt to prevent Anubis from using his super-weapon in "Full Circle", and is stripped of his powers, memories and returned to flesh and blood. Following Daniel's return to human form, it was the suggestion of writer and co-producer Paul Mullie that there should be some "residual memories" from Daniel's time as an ascended being. Mullie felt that it was a "requirement of the season in that we had some issues to deal with, the first being Daniel's return and what does he remember", and wanted the season to answer "does he regret having been pretty much kicked out of the ranks of the Ascended?". Executive producer Robert C. Cooper commented that "Daniel wasn't just going to get his memory back and be ready to go next episode; these things are going to reverberate throughout the season", as well stating "we don't like to wrap everything up neatly at the end of one episode". This gave writer Peter DeLuise his inspiration for what would become "Orpheus". DeLuise imagined Daniel as having what he described as a "tortuous fragment of a memory" from his time ascended, whilst Mullie felt the character would also be "trying to come to terms with being Human again and no longer having special abilities". Shanks's desire to see his character move away from a "passive observer" was also taken into account in writing "Orpheus", with Daniel Jackson becoming more "proactive" in pushing forward their cause in the episode and from this point onwards. DeLuise described the unravelling of Daniel's memory as "our door into the adventure" that eventually leads to Bra'tac and Rya'c, who have been imprisoned.

Although the Daniel Jackson character was the catalyst for DeLuise's story, it was Teal'c that he chose to focus his episode on. In the previous season's episode "The Changeling", Teal'c loses his Goa'uld symbiote, a creature which until that point was responsible for keeping him alive, and is forced to instead begin using an experimental drug called Tretonin. DeLuise wanted to examine how this change had affected Teal'c, with co-producer Joseph Mallozzi explaining that they "wanted to do a story in which Teal'c is seriously injured and has to go through physiotherapy and the same type of painful recovery process that an ordinary Human being has to". DeLuise was also inspired by the popular concept of putting a character through their own personal hell, citing the episode "Orpheus 3.3" of his old show 21 Jump Street and the Ancient Greek legend that it drew influence from of Orpheus and Eurydice. Orpheus' journey to the underworld of Hades to rescue his wife Eurydice were plot elements DeLuise adapted to his story, with Teal'c being the one who must journey to hell to save his son, Ry'ac and master, Bra'tac. Whilst DeLuise had Teal'c sustain a physical injury, it was the physiological affects this would have on the character that he really wanted to delve into. DeLuise considered previous episode's including "Rules of Engagement", where only the strongest Jaffa survive. Looking to expand upon this, DeLuise decided on the concept that Jaffa would use the same word for 'death' as they do for 'weakness', reasoning that "In Jaffa culture if one is weak, one might as well be dead", which would therefore see Teal'c fall into a state of "state of living death" following his injury. DeLuise also wanted to give Teal'c actor Christopher Judge the opportunity "to show weakness, and do some acting other than just cocking his eyebrow".

=== Cast ===
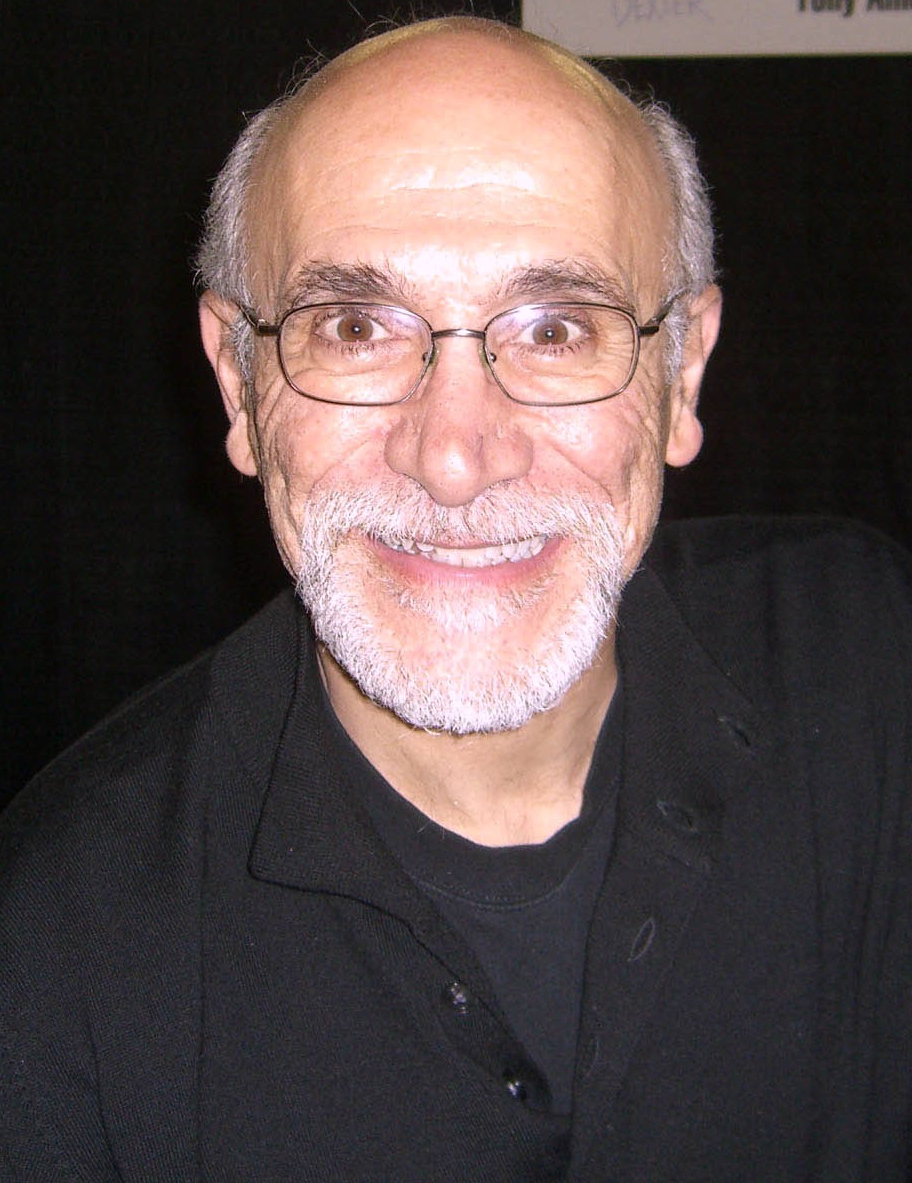
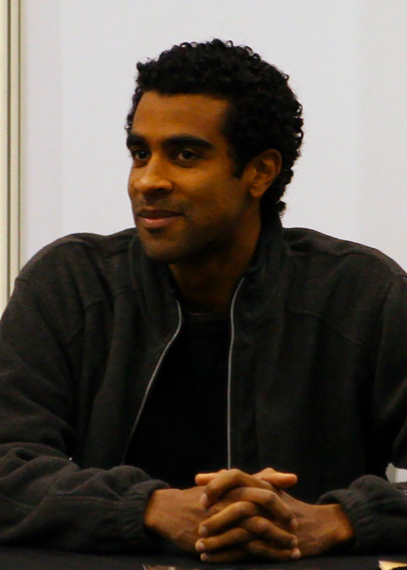
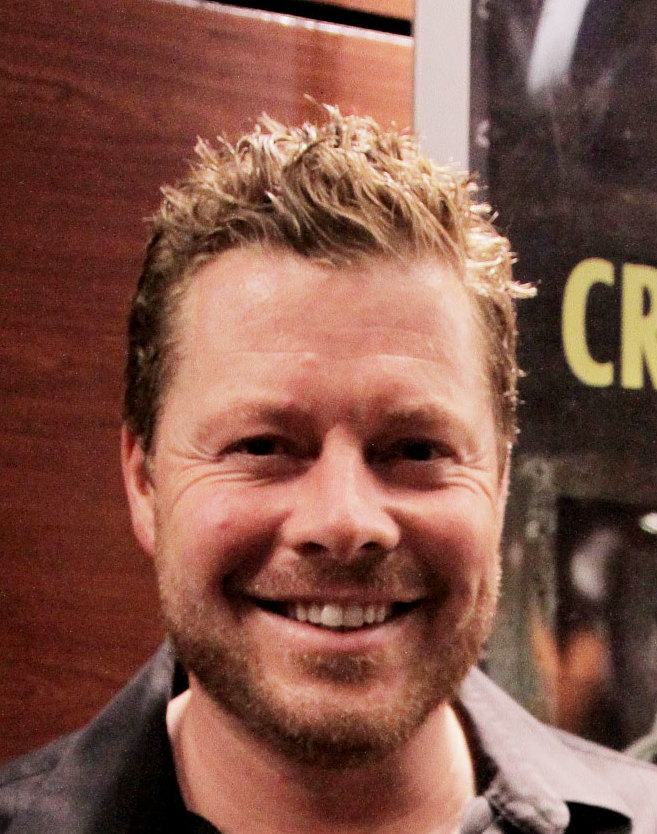
Tony Amendola (left) and Obi Ndefo (middle) respectively reprise their roles of Bra'tac and Rak'nor for the first time in season seven whilst David Richmond-Peck (right) portrays the Jaffa commander.

David Richmond-Peck portrays the story's antagonist, a Jaffa Commander. Serving the Goa'uld System Lord Ba'al, the character oversee's the Goa'uld forced Labor camp on the world of Erebus. DeLuise based elements of the character off of Ralph Fiennes' depiction of Amon Göth from the film Schindler's List. DeLuise wanted the character to be easily identifiable in shots and therefore had Richmond-Peck's hair dyed bleach blond, whilst in order to "make him look more evil" the director opted to give him a white, "goopy" eye, having Peck wear a contact lens. Tony Amendola, Obi Ndefo and Neil Denis all reprise their roles as rebel Jaffa characters Bra'tac, Rya'c and Rak'nor and Teryl Rothery also returns as Dr. Janet Fraiser. Amanda Tapping's stand in Sheri Noel was cast as the physiotherapist. Gary Jones is credited as technician, whilst director Martin Wood makes a cameo as another Stargate Command technician. Dan Shea's character Siler was originally in the episode, but his scenes were ultimately cut out.

=== Filming and post-production ===
Peter DeLuise directed the episode, with Peter Woeste serving as director of photography. Filming on "Orpheus" began in March 2003, overlapping slightly with work on the opening two-part episodes "Fallen" & "Homecoming", which was concluding filming. As well as filming on the shows standing sets at The Bridge Studios, Jackson Pit; a disused gravel pit in Coquitlam, British Columbia was chosen for the location of the Goa'uld labor camp. Due to heavy rainfall, filming at Jackson Pit was particularly challenging for the both crew and the actors, with production designer Bridget McGuire describing it as "the show that nearly killed us", whilst Christopher Judge later reflected that "the episode wasn't much fun due to the weather, which was absolutely horrible". The mixture of 50 background actors and stunt performers were ferried between Jackson Pit and a location in Maple Ridge for the film of the episode "Homecoming". The crew had to dig out trenches to direct water flow away from the set, whilst stunt co-ordinator Dan Shea highlighted that a number of the performers kept slipping over and falling down during scenes due to the wet surface. In the pit itself, McGuire's production team designed and built a bucket-wheel excavator as the centre piece of the set, whilst smaller tents surrounded the mine itself. Set decorators also buried children's swimming pools into the pit to create what looked like bubbling tar pits.

In constructing the cinematography for the episode, DeLuise and Woeste wanted scenes to be "more intimate", with DeLuise reasoning that he wanted to "look at how these people feel, rather than what they're doing", and so the subjects faces were often tightly framed during scenes, which was achieved using long-focus camera lenses. Whilst most of the episode was shot on 35 mm movie film, as was typical for the show at the time, the memory-recall sequences involving Daniel Jackson were shot on 16 mm film as Woeste wanted these scenes to utilize its more grainy aesthetic. Additionally a combination of desaturating, push processing and using flashes of the original 16 mm film negative was employed by Woeste during post to make the sequences appear "removed from reality". In an earlier cut of the episode, there was originally a shot Teal'c's smouldering stomach wound, having staff-blast, however it was ultimately removed. Woeste and DeLuise also had shot additional scenes in the gym, however they were cut as Cooper felt they were "too Baywatch-ish" Various scenes at the Goa'uld labor camp involved crowd replication, whereby around 40-50 extras were filmed, then redressed and repositioned within the frame. These different frames were then stitched together in post-production to make the crowd look far more populated. Art director James Robbins created concept artwork for the episode, in which the pyramid of the Goa'uld Ha'tak was "at least 50% bigger than what was in previous episodes" according to Lead 3D animator Wes Sargent. Sargent liked Robbins scaled up version, and was allowed to entirely rebuild the CGI model of the mothership for the episode, basing it off of Robbins larger pyramid illustration.

=== Cultural references ===
The M. Night Shyamalan 2002 film Signs, although not directly named, is reviewed by Carter, with the character heavily criticising the fact the aliens weakness is water. Numerous references are made by Jack O'Neill and Teal'c to the Austin Powers film series, with O'Neill believing Teal'c has lost his "mojo". DeLuise based his choice of shots of the Jaffa running up the hill towards the Goa'uld mothership whilst under mortar fire on a scene from The Thin Red Line (1998), whilst there are also visual references to The Pianist (2002) and The Three Musketeers (1993). Nickolas Baric, who had appeared in numerous previous episodes as different background characters portrays a soldier named Penhall, a reference to DeLuise's 21 Jump Street character Doug Penhall. The tale of Orpheus and Eurydice from Ancient Greek mythology informs parts of the story and title, with the Goa'uld world on which the labor camp is located named Erebus, which is a "place of darkness between earth and Hades", also from the mythology.

== Release ==
=== Broadcast and reception ===
The episode was first broadcast on June 27, 2003, on the Sci-Fi Channel in the United States and achieved a 1.6 household rating. In the United Kingdom, the episode was broadcast first on Sky One on October 20, 2003, and attracted 660,000 viewers. It was later syndicated onto Channel 4 on September 19, 2004. In Canada, the episode first aired on September 30, 2004, on Space.

Jayne Dearsley at SFX awarded the episode 4 out of 5 stars, calling writer and director Peter DeLuise "the man who seems to know Stargate SG-1 better than anybody else". Dearsley felt as though the labor camp scenes in the middle of the episode lacked the urgency and danger needed, but believed this was made up for in the "huge battle at the climax" of the episode. Jan Vincent-Rudzki at TV Zone bemoaned the trope of "warriors who lose their honour", and was of the opinion that "Teal'c just wallows too much in self pity", awarding the episode 6 out of 10. The episode was recommended by Courtney Potter at Zap2it as one of their 'best bets'. Chloe Richards at Dreamwatch called the episode "a standard Goa'uld drama and is served nicely by Judge and Shanks".

Response from contributors on fansite Gateworld.net was largely positive, with reviewer Alli Snow praising Christopher Judge's performance as Teal'c as being amongst the highlights of the episode. Another contributor, Lex, applauded the episode as a "master class in character development" in regard to the arcs of both Teal'c and Daniel, and praised DeLuise for fitting "vast and powerful" themes "into such a short space of time without any feeling of it being rushed or crowded". Darren Rea of Sci-Fi Online awarded the episode 7 out of 10, and whilst they enjoyed Judge's performance, they were of the opinion that Teal'c "seemed a little out of character" in the episode.

=== Home media ===
"Orpheus" was first released as part of the "Volume 32" region 2 DVD on February 2, 2004, along with previous episodes "Fallen", "Homecoming" and "Fragile Balance" which topped the UK TV On Video Chart the following week. It was then released as part of the complete Season 7 boxsets on October 19, 2004, in region 1 and February 28, 2005, in region 2. The episode, along with the rest of season 7 were first made available digitally in January 2008 through iTunes and Amazon Unbox. The episode, along with every other episode of the series, were made available to stream for the first time through Netflix in the USA on August 15, 2010. Director Peter DeLuise and cinematographer Peter Woeste provide the audio commentary for the episode. The episode, along with the rest of the series has been upscaled for releases on various streaming platforms as well as the 2020 Blu-ray release. A deleted scene was posted on June 30, 2003, on the Sci-Fi Channel website involving Daniel talking to Siler about the voices he's been hearing.
