= Homecoming (Stargate SG-1) =

- Stargate SG-1 episode
- Episode no.: Season 7 Episode 2
- Directed by: Martin Wood
- Written by: Joseph Mallozzi & Paul Mullie
- Cinematography by: Jim Menard
- Editing by: Rick Martin
- Production code: P267
- Original air date: June 13, 2003
- Running time: 44 minutes

Guest appearances
- Corin Nemec as Jonas Quinn; Cliff Simon as Ba'al; Kevan Ohtsji as Oshu; David Palffy as Anubis; Michael Adamthwaite as Her'ak; Doug Abrahams as Commander Hale; Adrian Hough as Goa'uld Lieutenant; Gillian Barber as Ambassador Dreylock; Gary Jones as Walter Harriman; Glynis Davies as Ambassador Noor; Jan Bos as Ambassador Sevarin

Episode chronology
← Previous "Fallen"	Next → "Fragile Balance"
- Stargate SG-1 (season 7)

"Homecoming" is the 2nd episode of the seventh season of adventure military science fiction television series Stargate SG-1. The second part of a two-part episode, it was first broadcast on June 13, 2003, on the Sci-Fi Channel, directly after the part 1, "Fallen". Writing duo Paul Mullie and Joseph Mallozzi wrote the episode, with Martin Wood directing. The episode is the 134th overall.

In this episode, having learnt that Jonas Quinn's (Corin Nemec) homeworld of Langara is rich with a powerful mineral called naquadria, Anubis lays siege to the planet in order to harness the mineral in order to once again power his superweapon. Meanwhile, Daniel Jackson (Michael Shanks) attempts to locate Jonas, who has been imprisoned, whilst himself evading capture onboard Anubis' mothership. Jack O'Neill & Samantha Carter come to the aid of the Langaran people and Teal'c (Christopher Judge) pleads with Oshu (Kevan Ohtsji) to release him and help destroy Anubis.

The episode marks the departure of character Jonas Quinn (Corin Nemec), who became a member of the SG-1 team in season 6 following the departure of Michael Shanks. "Fallen" & "Homecoming" set a new record as both the most watched broadcast ever for the Sci-Fi Channel and most watched episode of the show so far.

== Plot ==
Continuing from the previous episode, the Goa'uld Anubis is holding Jonas Quinn (Corin Nemec) captive onboard his mothership and after probing his mind has discovered that his world is rich in a powerful mineral called naquadria. Hoping to obtain and exploit the naquadria, Anubis travels to Quinn's homeworld of Langara and descends in his mothership on the State of Kelowna. Commander Hale (Doug Abrahams) and Ambassador Dreylock (Gillian Barber) of Kelowna use the Stargate to contact Stargate Command and plea for General George Hammond (Don S. Davis) to send help. Hammond hesitantly agrees to send Colonel Jack O'Neill (Richard Dean Anderson) and Major Samantha Carter (Amanda Tapping) to assist the Langarans, as Anubis' forces begin rounding up all of the Kelownan scientists involved in their naqahdriah project.

On the ship of Goa'uld System Lord Yu, his First Prime Oshu (Kevan Ohtsji) visits an imprisoned Teal'c (Christopher Judge) in his cell. Teal'c urges Oshu to assume command of his senile master's fleet and destroy Anubis, to which Oshu finally agrees, and releases Teal'c. Believing their force alone will not be enough, the pair contact the rival System Lord Ba'al (Cliff Simon) and persuade him to support them in crushing their common enemy, Anubis. Meanwhile, Anubis' forces onboard his mothership prepare to test the destructive power of the naqahdriah with the ship's weapons, whilst Daniel Jackson (Michael Shanks) eludes capture. As Jackson manages to locate the imprisoned Jonas, he is cornered by Anubis' Jaffa. The naqahdriah test begins, but soon overloads, resulting in explosions throughout the mothership which blindside the Jaffa and allow Jackson to take action, defeating them and liberating Jonas.

Carter and O'Neill, with the help of a recently returned Teal'c, deduce that Anubis is looking for a data crystal that the Kelownans are storing. The crystal may contain ancient Goa'uld knowledge about naqahdriah's instability and secrets to its control. The three of them along with Ambassador Dreylock journey to the warehouse where the crystal is stored, but after acquiring the crystal are surrounded by Anubis' Jaffa. On Anubis' mothership, although they don't know where it will end up taking them, Jonas and Daniel use a ring transporter to escape capture. The rings take them into the warehouse where O'Neill, Carter, Teal'c and Ambassador Dreylock are being held by Anubis' forces, who Jackson and Jonas are able to overpower.

As SG-1 and company return to the bunker, they discover that Commander Hale has betrayed them by summoning Anubis' Jaffa who once again demand the data crystal. Hale hands it to Anubis' First Prime, Her'ak (Michael Adamthwaite), who proceeds to murder him and declares that all present will be executed in public. Ba'al's fleet swiftly arrives in orbit and begins raining down fire upon Anubis' ship which still hovering above the city which weakens its shields. As the bunker quakes from the bombardment above, O'Neill and Teal'c spring into action and a firefight with Anubis' forces ensues. As Sam grapples Her'ak for the crystal, Jonas saves Daniel from being shot but in doing so is struck by the blast. Her'ak manages to escape through the Stargate, but without the crystal and Anubis' ship is destroyed as it attempts to flee; however Anubis escapes in an escape pod. Back on Earth at Stargate Command, Ambassador Dreylock tells the recovering Jonas Quinn that he is needed amongst his people, and with the return of Daniel Jackson he decides to return home to Kelowna.

== Production ==
=== Development and writing ===
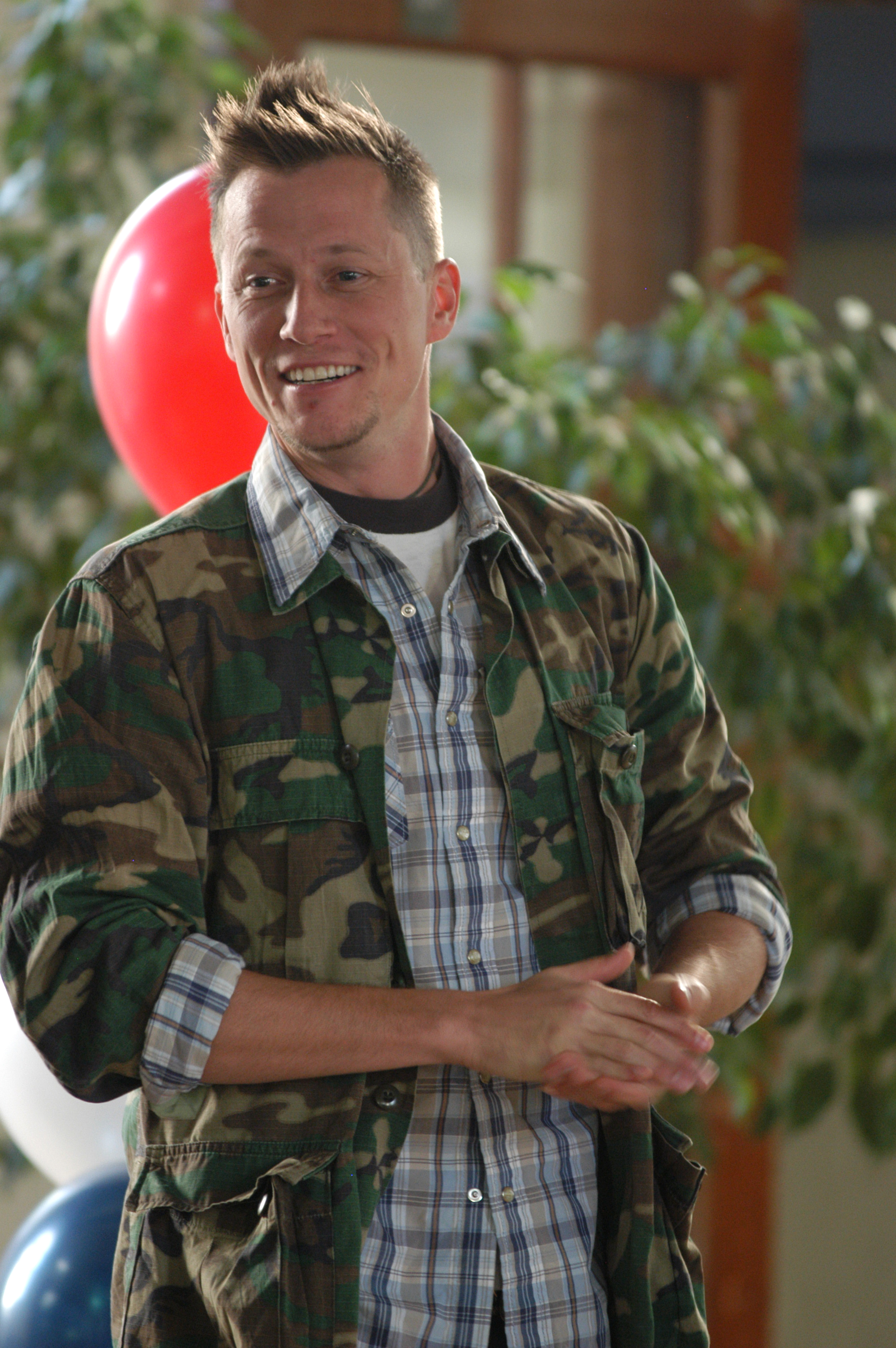
The storyline of Jonas Quinn, portrayed by actor Corin Nemec comes to a close.

With Michael Shanks having returned as Dr. Daniel Jackson, it was decided that the character of Jonas Quinn, portrayed by Corin Nemec would be reduced to a reoccurring cast member. The decision to reduce Nemec's role was attributed to a number of different reasons by the shows creative team. Believing that season 7 would be the shows last, writer and co-executive producer Joseph Mallozzi commented "it came down to the decision to let Michael Shanks finish what he had started and close out the show with the original team", further reasoning that whilst the personalities of Daniel and Jonas were different, they made "very similar contributions to the team". Executive producer Robert C. Cooper felt that a five-person team would be "too crowded" and mean that not all of the characters would be properly serviced, with Mallozzi also pointing out that the show had already established that SG teams consist of four members and "it would seem odd" to deviate. Furthermore, Cooper also highlighted that the cost made it prohibitive to keep increase the cast size. Corin Nemec expressed his disappointment in the decision, although understood the reasoning behind it. Nemec did however feel as though he had "committed to the series based upon promises that were made and sadly, for a variety of reasons, things promised did not materialise", with it originally having been suggested that he would appear in the planned SG-1 feature film and then "be spun-off into the next series, into Stargate: Atlantis". Ultimately, a deal was then reached where Nemec would return for three episodes of season seven.

Co-executive producers and writing duo Joseph Mallozzi and Paul Mullie were assigned to write the episode, which would be the second-part of a two-part story, following on from Robert C. Cooper's season opener "Fallen". In writing the departure of the Jonas Quinn character, Mallozzi and Mullie "more than anything wanted to leave the door open for a possible revisit" and were entirely against either killing the character off or turning him into a villain. A fundamental intention of their writing was also bringing the Quinn character "full circle" and give him a complete arc. The duo therefore set their story on Quinn's home planet of Langara, where they drew on events of season five's episode "Meridian" and season six's "Shadow Play" by having Quinn's earlier warning to his people about the threat of the Goa'uld ring true, with Anubis invading Langara. Cooper explained that Jonas had "left his planet branded a traitor but believed he was doing the right thing by getting to know the galaxy", with the character having spent the last year as a member of SG-1 they had him "take that knowledge and experience back home" to help his people, ending up in what Mullie described as "a position of both respect and authority on his world".

Mallozzi felt that it "fit the story" to have Jonas and Daniel run the operation onboard Anubis' ship together, explaining "If anyone was to be on that ship, it would be the two of them with their knowledge of the Goa’uld language and mothership schematics", although did further admit that "the opportunity to team them was something to which we really looked forward to". In Mullie and Mallozzi's original screenplay, the final scene of the episode between Jack O'Neill (Richard Dean Anderson) and Daniel "was different in the first draft but subsequently changed — but not by Rob [Cooper]" Mallozzi revealed, also noting that he had O'Neill call Jackson "space monkey", a callback to season two's "The Serpent's Lair", but the idea was nixed.

=== Cast, filming and post-production ===
Cliff Simon reprises his role as the Goa'uld system lord Ba'al, making his only appearance in season 7. To minimise costs, it was originally written that Ba'al would not be shown onscreen, as Simon would have to be flown in from Los Angeles to film his scenes. As production liked the actor and character, Ba'al's scenes were expanded and Cliff was flown in. David Palffy returns as Anubis, with Kevan Ohtsji and Michael Adamthwaite also returning as Oshu, First Prime of Yu and Her'ak, First Prime of Anubis. Adrian Hough portrays an unnamed Goa'uld scientist, one of Anubis' lieutenants. Hough would later go on to portray the character Pranos in the Stargate Atlantis episode "The Brotherhood". Gillian Barber and Doug Abrahams return as the Kelownan characters of Ambassador Dreylock and Commander Hale, having first been introduced in the episode "Shadow Play". Additionally Glynis Davies and Jan Bos portray Kelownan ambassadors Noor and Sevarin. Multiple stunt performers were hired for the roles of the Jaffa soldiers, including Daniel Cudmore, Aaron Thompson and Fraser Aitcheson.

The episode was directed by Martin Wood, with cinematography by Jim Menard. Filming began in the last week of February, 2003. The bunker set from the television series Jeremiah, a show that Wood had frequently directed on and which was also filmed at The Bridge Studios was redressed to serve as the Kelownan's new Stargate facility. As Jeremiah was not in production at the time, the crew took over the set for around a week, assembling the portable Stargate prop and bringing in various set pieces from previous episodes set on the world of Langara. The scene involving Oshu (Kevan Ohtsji) visiting Teal'c (Christopher Judge) in his prison cell was originally more confrontational, however Wood felt it would be better that Teal'c be more understanding of Oshu's situation and therefore asked Judge to play the scene without any anger.

Image Engine produced the episodes visual effects. The effect of Anubis' mothership descending over the Langaran city of Kelowna was an homage to Independence Day (1996), whilst the Kelownan cityscape effects feature the North Shore Mountains of Vancouver in the background plate. During editing, Robert C. Cooper noticed that the Goa'uld scientist, portrayed by Adrian Hough, had been given a staff weapon. Cooper felt that this incorrectly implied that the Goa'uld character was in fact a Jaffa and decided that the scene would have to be entirely reshot.

== Release ==
=== Broadcast and ratings ===
"Homecoming" premiered on June 13, 2003, on the Sci-Fi Channel, directly after previous episode, "Fallen". The episodes were preceded by a behind the scenes look at the making of the seventh season of the show, "Stargate: The Lowdown". The two-part season opening set a new record as the most watched broadcast ever for the Sci-Fi Channel, with a 1.9 Nielsen rating, equating to approximately 2.43 million viewers. This made it the most watched episode of Stargate SG-1 to-date and also the number 1 basic-cable television broadcast that day. In the UK, "Homecoming" was first shown on Sky One on October 6, 2003, and was the channel's 7th most watched show that week with 760,000 viewers. In Canada, the episode was first aired on September 16, 2004, on Space.

=== Reception ===
A number of publications commented on Jonas' exit from the series, including TV Zone which commented “after doing such a fine job in Season Six, it’s a shame that Corin Nemec’s character was not allowed to remain as a series regular”. Reviews featured on fansite Gateworld particularly enjoyed the dynamic between Jonas Quinn and Daniel Jackson that ran across this and the previous episode, believing that Jonas' personality had only begun to come "to the fore" in these episodes. Vincent-Rudzki also complemented the Jonas-Daniel pairing and hoped that it would be featured again in future episodes. Jayne Dearsley for SFX echoed this, writing "They really do have great chemistry in their scenes, with Jonas's sparky personality perfectly complementing Daniel's laid-back (if forgetful) vibe". Darren Rea for Sci-fi Online felt "slightly disappointed" by the handling of Jonas Quinn's exit in the episode's conclusion. Julia Houston at About.com asked fans to write to her with their thoughts on the return of Jackson and Quinn's exit, concluding "it's been a while since people have written so passionately about a series".

In her review for SFX, Jayne Dearsley awarded the episode 5 stars, writing "There's a hell of a lot going on in this episode, and most of it is thoroughly entertaining". Dearsley highlighted the scenes between Teal'c (Christopher Judge) and Oshu (Kevan Ohtsji) as being "acted magnificently", as well as directing her praise at the "astonishing" visual effects. Chloe Richards for Dreamwatch praised the "warm interplay" between the show's main characters and the "spectacular" special effects in both "Fallen" & "Homecoming", calling them a "suitably epic - if wholly unsurprising - start" to the season. IGN awarded the episode 3.5 out of 5, applauded the continued refining of the shows "rich mythology". Jan Vincent-Rudzki for TV Zone praised the episode and continued growth of the series as a whole, writing "this series is such a joy to watch - you never can tell what might happen next". New York Daily News highlighted the return of Michael Shanks.

=== Home media ===
"Homecoming" was first released as part of the "Volume 32" region 2 DVD on February 2, 2004, along with previous episode "Fallen", "Fragile Balance" and "Orpheus" which topped the UK TV On Video Chart the following week. It was then released as part of the complete Season 7 boxsets on October 19, 2004, in region 1 and February 28, 2005, in region 2. The episode, along with the rest of season 7 were first made available digitally in January 2008 through iTunes and Amazon Unbox. The episode, along with every other episode of the series, were made available to stream for the first time through Netflix in the USA on August 15, 2010. Michael Shanks, director Martin Wood and cinematographer Jim Menard provide the audio commentary for the episode. The episode, along with the rest of the series has been upscaled for releases on various streaming platforms as well as the 2020 Blu-ray release.
