= Fallen (Stargate SG-1) =

- Stargate SG-1 episode
- Episode no.: Season 7 Episode 1
- Directed by: Martin Wood
- Written by: Robert C. Cooper
- Cinematography by: Jim Menard
- Editing by: Rick Martin
- Production code: P265
- Original air date: June 13, 2003
- Running time: 44 minutes

Guest appearances
- Corin Nemec as Jonas Quinn; George Touliatos as Shamda; Kevan Ohtsji as Oshu; David Palffy as Anubis; Michael Adamthwaite as Her'ak; Gary Jones as Walter Harriman; Adrian Hough as Goa'uld Lieutenant; Vince Crestejo as Yu

Episode chronology
← Previous "Full Circle"	Next → "Homecoming (Part 2)"
- Stargate SG-1 (season 7)

"Fallen" is the 1st episode of the seventh season of science fiction television series Stargate SG-1. The episode was first broadcast on June 13, 2003, on the Sci-Fi Channel and was immediately followed by the 2nd episode and conclusion to the two-part story, "Homecoming". A behind the scenes documentary and look ahead at the upcoming seventh season called "Stargate: The Lowdown" preceded the episode. Executive producer Robert C. Cooper wrote the episode, with Martin Wood directing. The episode is the 133rd overall.

In the episode, continuing their search for the Lost City of the Ancients, Stargate Command discovers Daniel Jackson (Michael Shanks) living on an alien planet with no memory of who he is or how he got there. As SG-1 try to help Jackson remember who he is, they hatch a plan to lure the Goa'uld Anubis into a trap.

The episode set a new record as both the most watched broadcast ever for the Sci-Fi Channel and most watched episode of the show so far. Also notably, "Fallen" marks the return of Michael Shanks' character Daniel Jackson as a main cast member after leaving the main cast at the end of season five.

== Plot ==
On a planet of ancient ruins, four nomads walking in the forest come across a naked man lying among the dirt and leaves: It is Dr. Daniel Jackson (Michael Shanks). Back at Stargate Command, Jonas Quinn (Corin Nemec), who has been studying an ancient tablet discovers that the "lost city" that they have been searching for is a mistranslation; it is actually the "city of the lost". Furthermore, he believes that it would be the last on the list of Stargate addresses that Jack entered in the database when he had the repository of Ancient downloaded into his brain. SG-1 go to planet, referred to as Vis Uban, in hopes of finding the elusive city. SG-1 locates the ancient ruins and makes contact with the nomad tribe who inhabit it. Much to everyone's surprise, Daniel Jackson has been living amongst them. Known to the nomads as "Arrom", Jackson has no memory of his life before arriving on the planet, but in time Jack O'Neill (Richard Dean Anderson) and Samantha Carter (Amanda Tapping) convince him to return with them to Earth. Back on Earth, Daniel slowly begins to remember fragments of who he was and soon makes the assessment that Jonas' translation of the tablet is incorrect and that the Ancients deliberately hid their city, erasing it from historical documents and making the assessment that it isn't on Vis Uban. The team see an opportunity to lure Anubis, who is also searching for the Ancient lost city, to Vis Uban in order to destroy his super-weapon and cripple his mothership.

With help from the Tok'ra, Stargate Command gain incomplete specifications for Anubis' ship and set about planting a fake tablet for Anubis to find, luring him to Vis Uban. Knowing they will need to goad Anubis into powering the super-weapon in order to destroy it, Teal'c (Christopher Judge) then journeys through the Stargate to Lord Yu's stronghold to make an alliance, with Yu agreeing to send his fleet. As Anubis arrive in orbit above Vis Uban, Jonas and Daniel use rings to transport onboard his ship in order to locate the target. O'Neill and Carter then launch their attack from space in an F-302 fighter against Anubis' mothership and its death gliders, eventually using a hyperspace-burst to penetrate the ships shields and destroy the reactor. Unfortunately, the senile Yu becomes confused and orders his fleet of ships to journey elsewhere, and Teal'c is taken to a holding cell. Daniel and Jonas meanwhile become cornered by Anubis' Jaffa soldiers and manage to capture Jonas, who is then interrogated by Anubis.

== Production ==
=== Development and writing ===
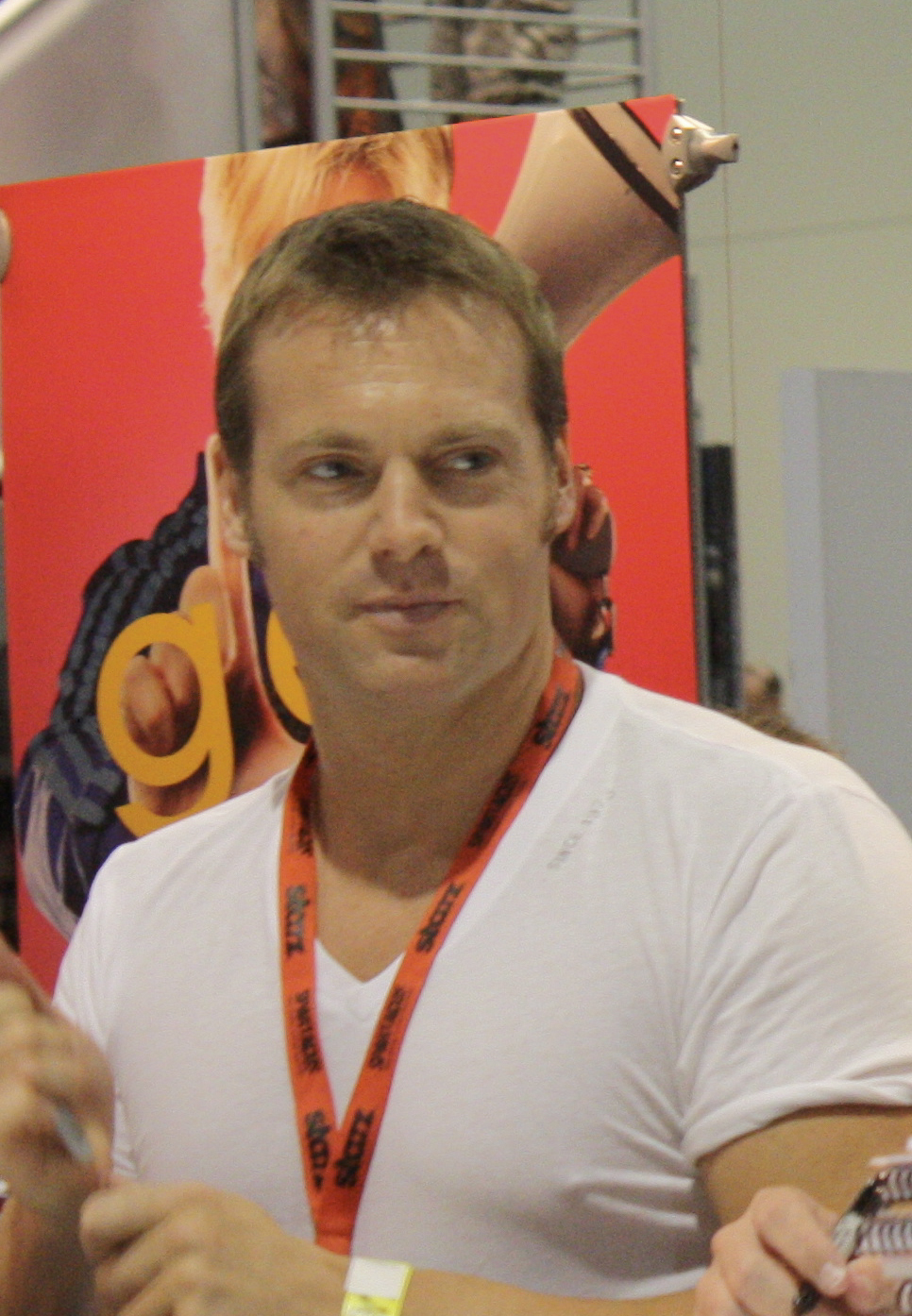
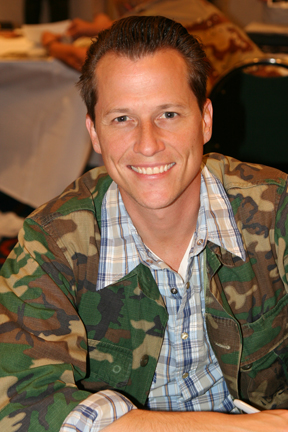
Michael Shanks returns to the main cast as Dr. Daniel Jackson, whilst Corin Nemec becomes a recurring cast member for season 7.

Stargate SG-1 was officially renewed by the Sci-Fi Channel for a seventh season on November 7, 2002, with the network confirming that Richard Dean Anderson would return as Jack O'Neill. The following day the network made the announcement that actor Michael Shanks would return as Daniel Jackson, once again as part of the main cast, having left at the end of season five. The following week it was further announced that Don S. Davis would return as George Hammond, Amanda Tapping as Samantha Carter and Christopher Judge as Teal'c, whilst Corin Nemec's Jonas Quinn would now be reduced to a reoccurring character. It was Robert C. Cooper and Brad Wright's intention after Michael Shanks exit in season five's "Meridian" to allow the possibility for Daniel Jackson to return by having the character "ascend to a higher plain of existence", instead of killing the character off. This led to a number of guest appearances across season six, culminating in the season's final episode, "Full Circle", which after completing, Shanks expressed his desire to Cooper to rejoin the show. Shanks, who had previously been unsatisfied with his characters development spoke at length with Cooper about the direction Daniel Jackson should head in. The pair agreed that the character needed to have evolved and developed, with Shanks commenting that "it can't be that Daniel comes back and everything goes back to the way it was before he left, because that would mean the show wasted a year evolving in a different direction without him". Shanks felt that Daniel's time amongst the ascended Ancients and being prevented by Oma Desala from preventing Anubis from destroying Abydos in "Full Circle" would have made the character suspicious of the Ancients, stating "he would be less inclined to smooth things over and would stop putting his faith in the hope that things will turn out all right". He also wanted Daniel to be "more intense, more restive and less satisfied" upon his return and felt that his character should "be less inclined to smooth things over and would stop putting his faith in the hope that things will turn out all right". Writer and producer Joseph Mallozzi pitched to Cooper that following "Full Circle", Daniel Jackson should retake human form, but in doing so he loses his memories, likening his return to "an angel cast down from heaven, stripped of his memories and left to start a new life on Earth". Shanks and Cooper felt that given the "philosophical difference" between Daniel and the ascended Ancient beings, the character would make the decision to return as flesh and blood, given the rules imposed upon him during his time ascended, with Shanks commenting "he's not actually going to accomplish much by staying on the path he's currently on".

Beyond the return of Daniel Jackson, the attack against Anubis' mothership was one of the other most significant plot points. Being a big fan of Star Wars, Robert C. Cooper based many of the sequences on both the original 1977 film and Return of the Jedi, even having O'Neill directly reference "red leader". The production team spent two days storyboarding what would become a complicated visual effects sequence to ensure that the live action photography and visual effects would match. Director Martin Wood also consulted a fighter pilot to make the dialog that would be used by Jack O'Neill and Samantha Carter more accurate.

Some scenes caused debate amongst both the production team and the cast members. Mallozzi recalled that there was debate amongst the writers as to whether Jack O'Neill's "no, but he plays one on TV" response to another character pointing out Teal'c for being Jaffa broke the fourth wall, with it ultimately being kept in. During development of the episode, director Martin Wood felt that the reintroduction of Daniel Jackson and Jonas returning to his home world needed to be a four episode arc, however it was decided that this would take up too much of the season and not service enough of the other characters.

George Touliatos portrays Shamda, the leader of the nomad people who inhabit the ancient city on Vis Uban, with Raahul Singh playing one of his people, Khordib. Touliatos previously portrayed the character of Pyrus in the episode "Need". The episode introduced the reoccurring character of Oshu, Yu's First Prime, portrayed by Kevan Ohtsji. Martin Wood specifically wanted to cast someone in the position of Yu's first prime who wasn't as tall and physically imposing as some of the previous First Prime's, particularly in contrast to Christopher Judge who he would share the majority of his scenes with. Johannah Newmarch returns as the Tok'ra operative Sina, whilst David Palffy, Michael Adamthwaite and Vince Crestejo return as Goa'uld reoccurring characters Anubis, Her'ak and Yu. Teryl Rothery, Gary Jones, Dan Shea and Eric Breker return as Dr. Janet Fraiser, Sgt. Walter Harriman, Sgt. Siler and Colonel Reynolds whilst director Martin Wood makes a cameo as a Stargate Command technician.

=== Filming ===
The episode was directed by Martin Wood, with Jim Menard as director of photography. Filming took place in February and March 2003. One of the episodes primary locations was an alien planet referred to as Vis Uban. Exterior scenes that would take place on the planet, such as Daniel Jackson descending were filmed at Tynehead Regional Park in Surrey, British Columbia. Production designer Bridget McQuire's team designed the city, with McQuire explaining "the idea behind this set was that the ancient colonnade is part of a city that's been abandoned for centuries. The new inhabitants were nomads", with the set being constructed at Norco Studio in Burnaby. Many of the regular sets at both Norco and The Bridge Studios were used, with the Goa'uld corridors being redressed to serve as both Yu and Anubis' ship interiors, with the Goa'uld cargo ship set redressed to serve as Anubis' bridge. Wood used wide angle lens' to make the re-dressed cargo ship look like a far larger space. In order to best capture the scenes involving Daniel crawling through the air-vent's onboard Anubis' ship, Menard had to construct his own makeshift camera dolly come crane that could pull in and out of the highly confined space. The F302 space fighter set from the previous season was also used. In order to simulate the space battle, Wood & Menard used lightning strikers, as well as blasting propane to create flames impacting the cockpit and used a device that physically shakes the camera to further simulate movement and impacts on the craft. Visual effects supervisor James Tichenor later directed a second unit of photography in March, for some of the pick-up shots in the interior of the F302.

As with previous seasons, Wood and Menard looked for new and interesting ways to shoot within the shows most prominently featured set, Stargate Command. This included a long take at the start of the episode that followed Corin Nemec's character Jonas Quinn throughout the set without any cuts. Wood also commented that he started splitting the briefing room table in half during scenes in "Fallen", something he would go on to do more and more in season seven.

For the reveal of Daniel Jackson descending, Martin Wood proposed that the shot be a much more cinematic wide shot from a crane extremely high in the sky; however this was reduced to a far closer crane shot than Wood wanted, with the director commenting that "people felt it was giving away too much, like Oma had just deposited him [Daniel] there". Amanda Tapping and Michael Shanks debated with Wood and Cooper over Daniel Jackson and Samantha Carter's reunion scene. The script sees an amnestic Daniel Jackson question if there was ever a romantic relationship between him and Sam, something Shanks and Tapping felt was out of place given the characters purely platonic friendship. Cooper justified its inclusion as signifying just how close friends Sam and Daniel were, to the point where an outsider observer might mistake their friendship for something more; with Shanks ultimately feeling that it really helped justify why Daniel decides to leave the nomads and return with SG-1 to Earth. Discussing performing Daniel Jackson's memory loss, Shanks commented that it proved far more challenging than he had foreseen; "everything you do with your character is a part of who he is. If you erase all that and then ask hi, 'who are you now?' naturally he hasn't a clue". Shanks worked to convey a sense of frustration in the character at his "inability to remember things and having to reestablish ties with friends".

=== Post-production ===
Wood was frustrated with many of the resulting scenes from "Fallen", remarking "I just didn't go a good job of it". Wood's particular dissatisfaction came from the pacing of the episode, noting that there was just too much to fit in two episodes and that it was "way too big". The first cut of "Fallen" was 11 minutes too long and had to be drastically cut down, with some scene being entirely cut out, with Wood noting that this mostly affected character moments. One of the earliest scenes between Jonas, General Hammond and Carter discussing the location of the Lost City was almost halved in length. Scenes expanding Daniel's (then known as "Arrom") relationship with the nomad people were also largely removed, including early scenes where Daniel expresses his frustration at being unable to remember anything to Shamda (George Touliatos), whilst O'Neill's discussion with Shamda before Daniel's arrival were trimmed down as was SG-1 and Daniel's exchange with Hammond in the gate room after returning to Earth. Following O'Neill leaving Daniel in his room at Stargate Command, there was originally a montage sequence involving Daniel studying his belongings, trying to remember the name of his deceased wife, Sha're, who he has a photo of. This would have then lead into the following scene where he tells Teal'c he's managed to remembered, with Wood feeling that it made it more of a victory for the character. One of the late scenes involving Jonas being interrogated by Anubis was also originally far longer.

Image Engine created the majority of the episodes visual effects, whilst Rainmaker and Krista Mclean also contributed with achieve effects created by GVFX also featuring. Former in-house matte painter Kent Matheson returned to the series to produce the matte paintings for the episode, for what would be his final contribution to the show. The included set extensions and scenery shots of the Ancient city on the planet referred to as Vis Uban. As scenes in Cooper's story had such unmistakable influence from Star Wars, Wood encouraged visual effects supervisor James Tichenor to really embrace and accentuate this influence in the visual effects sequences involving O'Neill and Carter's F302 attach against Anubis' mothership, borrowing elements from the Rebel Alliance's Death Star trench run from the 1977 film, and the reactor bombing run in Return of the Jedi. During the live action photography of the sequence, actors Richard Dean Anderson and Amanda Tapping wore masks that obscured their characters faces. Wood had the pair dub their entire performance, as they were laughing so much during the scenes.

== Release and reception ==
The plot for "Fallen" was revealed before filming commenced in January 2003.

=== Broadcast ===
"Fallen" premiered on June 13, 2003, on the Sci-Fi Channel and was immediately followed by the second part of the episode "Homecoming". The episode was preceded by a behind the scenes look at the making of the seventh season of the show, "Stargate: The Lowdown". The episode set a new record as the most watched broadcast ever for the Sci-Fi Channel, with a 1.9 Nielsen rating, equating to approximately 2.43 million viewers. This made it the most watched episode of Stargate SG-1 to-date and also the number 1 basic-cable television broadcast that day. In the UK, "Fallen" was first shown on Sky One on September 29, 2003. The episode had approximately 790,000 viewers, making it the channel's 4th most popular show that week.

=== Reception ===
IGN positively received the episode, awarding it 4 stars out of 5, commenting "SG-1 has maintained a certain level of comfort, like a favorite pair of blue jeans". The reviewer attested that whilst many shows struggle to keep their audience entertained, or become "too pretentious for their own good", Stargate SG-1 was showing "little sign of running out of gas". The reviewer appreciated the references throughout the episode to Star Wars, highlighting the quality of CGI effects sequence of the attack on Anubis' mothership. DVD Talk positively received the episode, commenting that the opening "gives a lot of fans what they have been clamouring for; the return of Daniel Jackson". Sci-fi Online awarded the episode 8 out of 10 stars, commenting on the humor, Star Wars references and that it "gets season seven off on the right foot".

TV Zone editor Jan Vincent Rudzki positively received the episode, awarding it 8/10. The reviewer was particularly praising of teaming Daniel Jackson (Shanks) and Jonas Quinn (Nemec) together, commenting that it "gives credence to Jonas' exit", whilst expressing that "the only downside is that the two worked so well together; it's a shame this new 'partnership' couldn't have continued". Brian Ford Sullivan for The Futon Critic awarded the two-parter the 39th position in his "The 50 Best Episodes of 2003" list, writing "You'd be hard pressed to find a better execution of your typical 'changing of the guard' episode(s)", praising the way the series continued to handle ongoing continuity and character arcs.

Although usually ignored by the mainstream press, being a season premiere various outlets covered the episode. Mark Sachs of Los Angeles Times applauded the two-parter as one of the "delights of its genre", whilst Zap2it also positively received the episode, with it leading their recommended shows for that day. The New York Daily News highlighted the return of Michael Shanks, as did The Boston Herald's John Ruch, although he denounced the two-parter as an "aging sci-fi series, which at this point looks pretty boring itself", claiming that "the most exciting thing Stargate SG-1 has to offer is the return of a cast member who was so bored with his character that he left the show".

The featured reviews on fansite Gateworld were mixed-average, with Alli Snow awarding 2.5 out of 5 stars and another featured review by Lex giving 3.5 out of 5. Snow enjoyed the interplay between Daniel Jackson (Michael Shanks) and Jonas Quinn (Corin Nemec), but was critical of what they believed to be contrived story. Reviewer Lex felt that the choice to pay homage to Star Wars was well executed, but had hoped for a more original sequence and was also critical of the portrayal of the "cliche" villain Anubis. The reviewer noted that the "most poignant moment" of the episode was the scene where Dr. Jackson (Michael Shanks) telling Teal'c (Christopher Judge) he's remembered the name of his wife.

=== Home media ===
"Fallen" was first released as part of the "Volume 32" region 2 DVD on February 2, 2004, along with subsequence episodes "Homecoming", "Fragile Balance" and "Orpheus". It was then released as part of the complete Season 7 boxsets on October 19, 2004, in region 1 and February 28, 2005, in region 2. The episode, along with the rest of season 7 were first made available digitally in January 2008 through iTunes and Amazon Unbox. The episode, along with every other episode of the series, were made available to stream for the first time through Netflix in the USA on August 15, 2010.

Two deleted scenes were made available on the Sci-Fi Channel's Stargate website in July 2003. The deleted scene involving Daniel receiving advice was later made available in May 2006 on Sci-Fi Channel Pulse video platform, along with other deleted scenes from season 7 and 8.
