= Fragile Balance =

- Stargate SG-1 episode
- Episode no.: Season 7 Episode 3
- Directed by: Peter DeLuise
- Written by: Peter DeLuise; Michael Greenburg
- Teleplay by: Damian Kindler
- Cinematography by: Peter Woeste
- Editing by: Brad Rines
- Production code: P266
- Original air date: June 20, 2003
- Running time: 44 minutes

Guest appearances
- Michael Welch as Jack O'Neill; Teryl Rothery as Janet Fraiser; Carmen Argenziano as Jacob Carter; Gregory Bennett as Lt. Col. Harlan Beck; Tom Heaton as Werner; Poppi Reiner as Pamela Ambrose; Ed Hong-Louie as Zyang Wu; Theresa Lee as Interpreter; Peter DeLuise as Loki; Chris Kramer as pilot; Dan Payne as officer

Episode chronology
← Previous "Homecoming"	Next → "Orpheus"
- Stargate SG-1 (season 7)

"Fragile Balance" is the 3rd episode from the seventh season of military science fiction television show Stargate SG-1 and is the 135th overall. It was first broadcast on June 20, 2003, on the Sci-fi Channel. The episode was written by Peter DeLuise and Michael Greenburg, with Damian Kindler writing the teleplay. DeLuise also directed the episode.

In the episode, a teenage boy who claims to be Colonel Jack O'Neill (Michael Welch) shows up at Stargate Command. Believing that the Asgard are involved, the team tries to find the culprit in order to unravel what has happened to Jack.

The episode was originally developed for season 4, and was then moved into season 5 and would have originally centred around a half-human, half-Asgard character called Odin. Eventually "Fragile Balance" was redeveloped as part of season 7, exploring themes such as alien abduction, human cloning as well as expanding upon the Asgard mythology. Michael Welch's performance as Jack O'Neill was particularly well received, with a sequel involving the character developed but ultimately went unmade.

== Plot ==
Major Samantha Carter (Amanda Tapping) is called by General George Hammond (Don S. Davis) to investigate an intruder who's attempted to gain access to Stargate Command by using Colonel Jack O'Neill's Air Force ID badge. When Hammond and Carter reach the holding cell, the “intruder” turns out to be a fifteen-year-old boy who claims he is Colonel O'Neill (Michael Welch). Initially, no one believes him. However, with the arrival of Daniel Jackson (Michael Shanks) and Teal'c (Christopher Judge, the boy rattles off facts about each of them, causing SG-1 to reconsider his claim. After genetic testing, Dr. Janet Fraiser (Teryl Rothery) determines that, outside of a small abnormality, the boy is Jack O'Neill. Carter, Teal'c, Jackson, and Hammond all begin treating him as such, but Carter and Teal'c also encourage him to enjoy his newfound youth. The team goes to Jack's house to try to ascertain the cause of this youth, and after a strange vision, Jack reveals that he was abducted, apparently by the Asgard.

Dr. Fraiser determines that Jack is dying, and that something must be done to prevent it, so the Tok'ra are contacted and Jacob Carter (Carmen Argenziano) arrives. He recommends that O'Neill be placed in stasis, which provokes Jack into escaping the base. After running into an old friend, Lt. Col. Harlan Beck (Gregory Bennett), Jack claims that he's the nephew of O'Neill in the hope his friend will buy him beer. Beck reports his sighting of Jack and the team take him back to Stargate Command. Meanwhile, Daniel and Teal'c have been investigating Jack's claim that he was abducted, and are interviewing people whose alien abduction stories are consistent with Jack's. They find eight such people in the United States, all of whom claim to have seen an Asgard similar to the one Jack saw, as well as glowing green lights. This information is complicated by the Tok'ra's finding that young Jack is actually a clone of O'Neill, and this has presumably happened to all the other abductees.

Believing that the Asgard responsible will re-abduct Jack after seven days, the team return to O'Neill's house and lie in wait. As Jack is beamed up to a ship, he immediately stuns an Asgard and brings the rest of the team on board. They learn from Loki, the Asgard responsible that he has been performing unsanctioned experiments on humans for years. After using the ship to communicate with the Asgard, Thor arrives and helps bring the regular O'Neill back, giving him the choice of whether or not to keep his clone. Jack decides to and Thor fixes the genetic defect, whereupon Thor condemns Loki to punishment. Back on Earth, the two O'Neill's go their separate way, with 15 year old Jack deciding to re-enter high school and agreeing it's best they don't keep in contact.

== Production ==
=== Development and writing ===
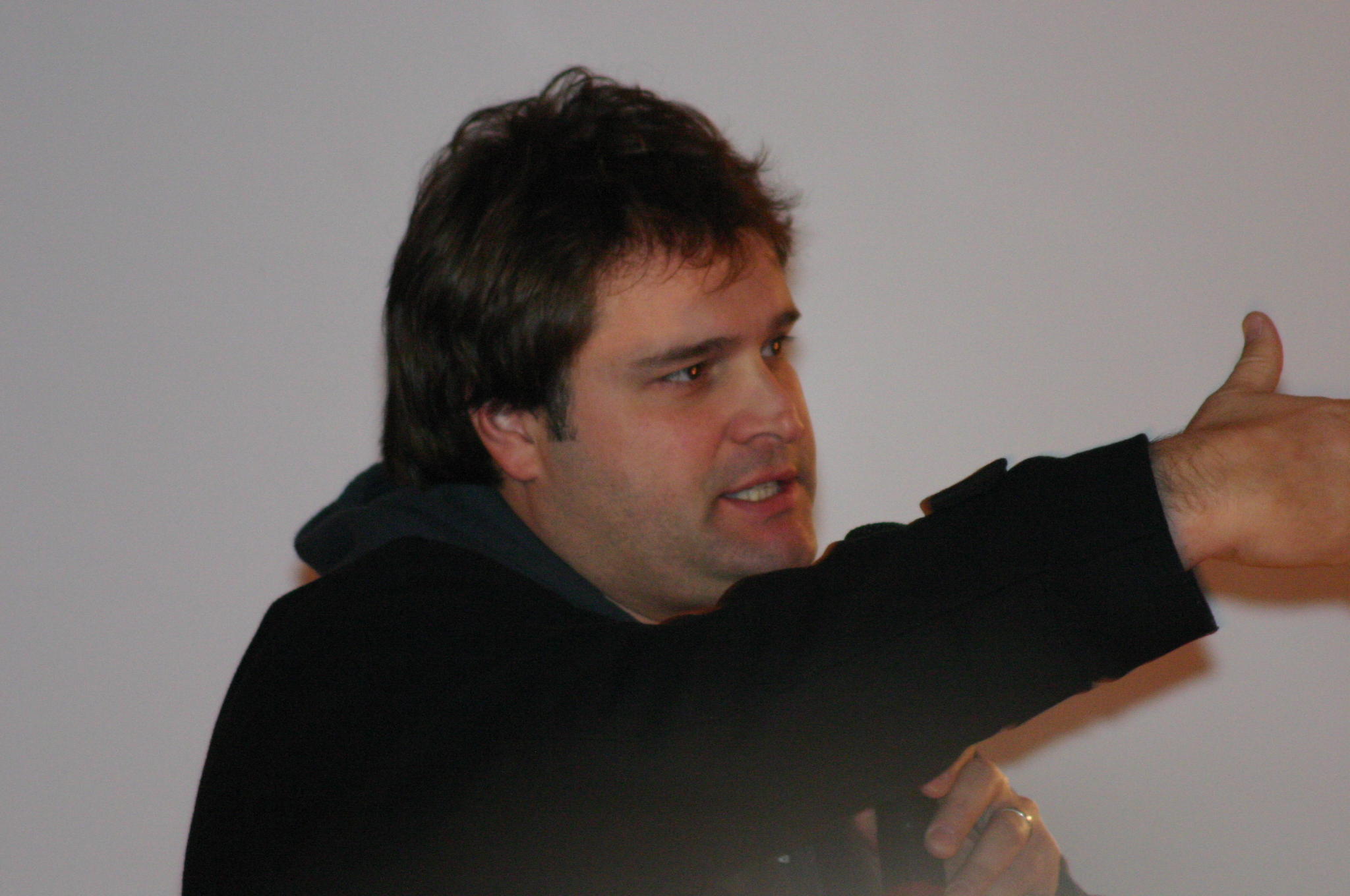
Peter DeLuise wrote the episode with Michael Greenburg.

"Fragile Balance" was developed by Peter DeLuise & Michael Greenburg and went through a number of different iterations before eventually being made. The episode was first discussed in 2000, as part of season 4, but was then put on hold. The following year, it was reported that the episode would further the Asgard storyline as well as introducing a new character and would be going before cameras after the cast and crews summer production hiatus as part of season 5. Pre-production had started on the episode, with art director Brentan Harron developing concept drawings for visual effects and the production design team. It wasn't until season 7 that "Fragile Balance" finally went into production. The new iteration married a number of different pitches together.

An earlier iteration of DeLuise's story imagined "Old O'Neill jumps into his younger body, a la Quantum Leap" and would have seen the character back at boot camp. According to Greenburg his original story examined the Asgard species and would have investigated their history of cloning, explaining he wanted to "attack the Asgard and their obvious physical and intellectual evolution". This would have unraveled how the species ended up with, what Greenburg described as creatures with "big heads, big brains, and their bodies are kind of genderless", and how they had deteriorated so far that they could no longer reproduce on their own. Further to this, Greenburg and DeLuise's original story would have involved a half human, half Asgard antagonist named Odin, a renegade who kidnaps Jack O'Neill to try and abate the "diminishing returns of cloning" by tapping into his DNA.

By season 7, Richard Dean Anderson's availability had become a key consideration for everyone involved in Stargate SG-1, with the actor now working 3-day weeks in order to spend more time with his daughter back in Los Angeles, United States. As such, the writers were looking for different reasons as to why Jack O'Neill might not be in every scene or episode. Peter DeLuise recounted that the premise of making a "young O'Neill" came whilst sitting in Robert C. Cooper's office, "I was inspired because I was looking right at Robert Cooper, and beyond him were these beautiful pictures of his gorgeous children, and I thought, you know, we should see O'Neill young". Cooper then expanded upon this, coming up with the idea that O'Neill had been abducted and cloned, but the clone was not fully matured. In creating the young O'Neill character, Cooper instructed Kindler, who scripted the story, to write young O'Neill exactly like he would write regular O'Neill. The ending of the story, with young O'Neill deciding to go high-school was a big discussion point in the writers room. Kindler, recalled that the question of "wouldn't you want to go back and do it again, knowing what you know, if you could go back in time, and have that chance, but have the knowledge you have now?" was what ultimately made the writers settle on the ending. Kindler also felt that the two O'Neill's were no longer the exact same person, with young O'Neill in the body of a 15 year old, already having been on his own adventure.

=== Cast ===
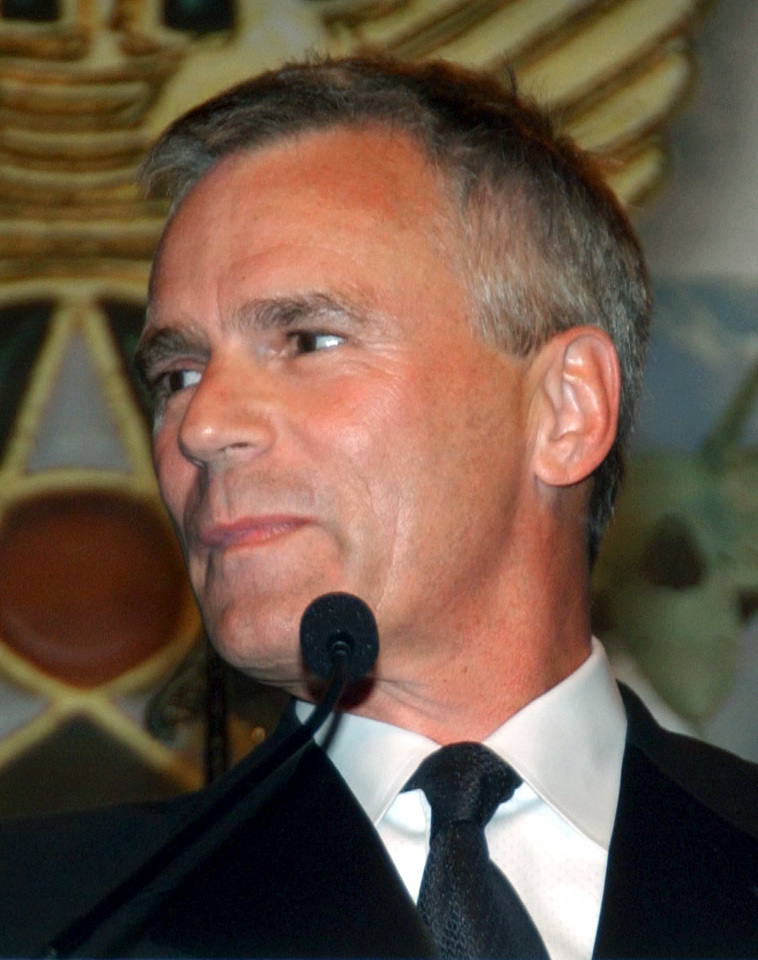
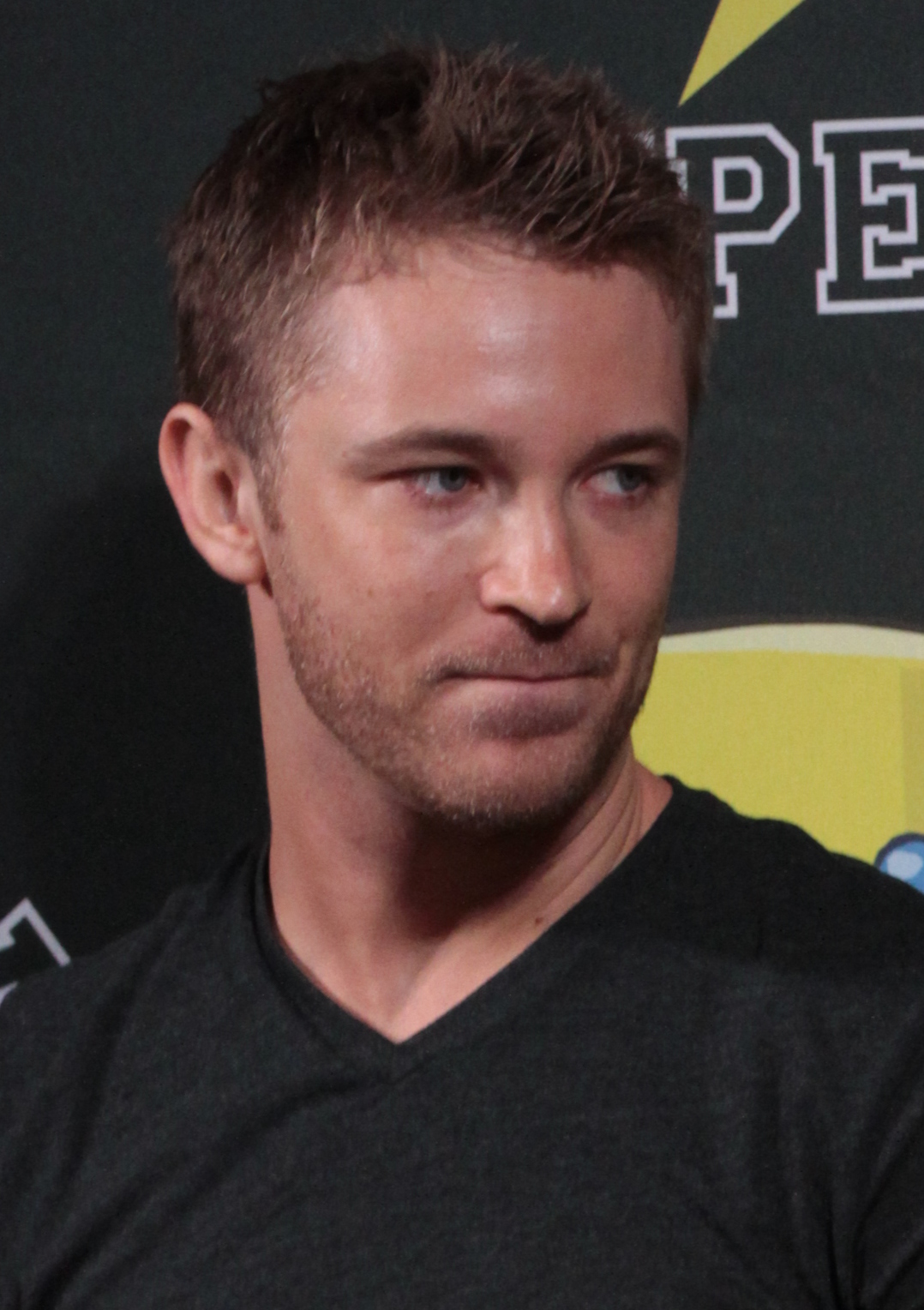
A young version of Richard Dean Anderson's character Jack O'Neill is played by Michael Welch.

Michael Welch was cast in the part of young Jack O'Neill. Welch, who was living in Los Angeles at the time, recorded a video audition for the role, and having not seen the show, performed the character "like it was written" as a "dry, sarcastic, very in-charge and in control of himself kind of guy". When deciding who to cast, DeLuise and Kindler later commented that there were a number of other actors who more closely resembled Richard Dean Anderson, however they felt Welch best embodied the role. They also felt Welch brought a somewhat "nerdy" and "vulnerable" quality to the character, which Kindler wanted in order to forward the notion that O'Neill did not have the best memories of being a teenager and would therefore hate being stuck in the body of his 15-year-old self. After casting Welch in the role, DeLuise worked with the editing team to put together a compilation of O'Neill moments that he felt would aid Welch in capturing O'Neill's mannerisms, attitude and the way in which he carried himself. Welch was also provided a number of episodes, including "Revelations" in order to gain insight into the Asgard's backstory. Watching the tapes in preparation, Welch recalled he "rewound them a hundred times, and I was up all night studying this guy", going on to describe the process as "very challenging. Richard Dean Anderson — he is so original. I don’t think there’s ever been an actor quite like him before".

Elsewhere in the episode, a new renegade Asgard scientist called Loki is featured, with influence taken from the God from Norse mythology of the same name. One of the puppeteers originally recorded dialog for the character, however Robert C. Cooper felt that it should be rerecorded, suggesting DeLuise do the part. Michael Shanks also provides the voice for the Asgard Thor, whilst other reoccurring characters include Dr. Janet Fraiser and Jacob Carter, played by Teryl Rothery and Carmen Argenziano. Frequent guest actor and stunt performer Dan Payne cameos in the episode as an Air Force security officer. Poppi Reiner portrays Pamela Ambrose, with Joey Shea, daughter of actor and stunt co-ordinator Dan Shea playing the young version of the character. Ed Hong-Louie plays the part of abductee, Zyang Wu, with Theresa Lee playing his interpreter. Gregory Bennett portrays Lt. Col. Harlan Beck and Tom Heaton plays Werner. Chris Kramer and Ralph Alderman both portray F-302 pilots.

=== Design, filming and post-production ===
Art director Brentan Harron first began conceptualising the interior and exterior of a new Asgard ship for the episode as part of season 5, although at this stage the ship was intended for the half-human, half-Asgard character Odin. Eventually, after the story was redeveloped for the shows seventh season, Odin was replaced with a different character, a renegade Asgard named Loki. The production design team abandoned their original concept drawings and started fresh on a new Asgard ship in season 7. Art director Peter Bodnarus explained that the design for their new Asgard ship was "something a little more organic" than some of the more "stark and compartmentalised" technology and ships which had previously featured. Production designer Bridget McQuire's principal idea was "tooth-like pylons", which Bodnarus and Robbins developed drawings of. These designs were then given to a company with a numerical control device which was used to precisely carve pieces of foam to form the ship. Bodnarus described the process of cutting pieces of foam from three different axes in order to form "an extremely elegant shape from which to work". Elements such as pylons and observational turrets were crafted, with the overall intention of creating something "a race as advanced as the Asgard would have built". For the Asgard probe on board the ship, McGuire explained that they wanted to make "something quite threatening and scary looking that could be suspended over a person". The probe was originally only going to appear in flashback sequences, but eventually this was expanded, with it appearing in more scenes and thus it needed to be more detailed. Existing Asgard set pieces, such as the Asgard medical pod from "Nemesis", and other pieces from "Small Victories" were used to dress the Asgard laboratory, which was constructed on Stage 6 of The Bridge Studios.

Peter DeLuise directed the episode, with Peter Woeste as director of photography. "Fragile Balance" was the first episode filmed in season 7, with production commencing in February 2003. Shooting took place across a number of different locations; with production using the reoccurring private residence in Fairmont Road, North Vancouver as both O'Neill's house as well as redressing the exterior to serve as a ranch. Other locations included a sushi café opposite The Bridge Studios on Boundary Road, which was redressed as a liquor store, Adanac Park Lodge in Burnaby, which was dressed as the fictional "Mountain Springs High School" and finally a woodland stream in Mosquito Creek, North Vancouver. Richard Dean Anderson, who had not yet returned to work, would only be present and available for the final day of filming the episode. As the actor wasn't on set, DeLuise tried to explain and demonstrate to Michael Welch how Anderson might act in a scene in order to help the actor best capture O'Neill. DeLuise asked Welch and the hair and make-up team not to conceal any of Welch's acne to further O'Neill's frustration at being a teenager and also had the naturally blue eyed actor wear darker contacts so as to match Anderson's. Elsewhere in the episode, Kindler looked through previous episodes at how other characters had managed to escape the mountain in order to map out how O'Neill would flee Stargate Command. For the scenes involving the Asgard, two different Asgard puppets were used for Loki and Thor, which were supplemented with visual effects shots in order to show the characters walking around the Asgard laboratory. The song "Who Am I?" by Lily Frost, from her 2001 album Lunamarium features in the final scene of the show.

=== Planned sequel ===
In July 2003, writer Joseph Mallozzi commented that there had been discussions about following-up on the character of Young O'Neill in the later part of season 7, but ultimately a story was not put together in time. The following year, Greenburg and DeLuise came up with a sequel to "Fragile Balance" as part of the shows eighth season, which had the working title "You Ain't Jack". Their story paired Welch's young O'Neill with Tom Mcbeath's character of Harry Maybourne. Welch was unable to commit due to working on the show Joan of Arcadia, which coupled with Anderson's limited schedule kept the episode in limbo and meant it was eventually replaced with the episode "It's Good to be King".

== Release ==
=== Broadcast and reception ===
"Fragile Balance" premiered on June 20, 2003, on Sci Fi in the United States, and achieved a 1.8 Nielsen rating, once again making it the channels most watched broadcast that week. In the United Kingdom, the episode was first shown on October 11, 2003, on Sky One and was the third most popular broadcast on the network that week, with approximately 900,000 viewers. In Canada, the channel Space first aired "Fragile Balance" on September 23, 2004.

Jayne Dearsley for SFX awarded the episode the maximum five stars, applauding Michael Welch's portrayal of Jack O'Neill as "absolutely stunning" and hailing the episode for being "laugh-out-loud funny". Dearsley felt that Welch had perfectly captured "every single one of Richard Dean Anderson's mannerisms", going on to comment "it's down to his believability that this episode works so well". Sci-fi Online writer Darren Rae awarded the episode 8 out 10, commending Welch's "superb job" as O'Neill. Jan Vincent-Rudzki for TV Zone also gave the episode a glowing review, proclaiming it as being both "brilliantly written and executed", awarding it 9 out of 10. "He has the great man's mannerisms, tones and intonations down to perfection" Vicent-Rudzki wrote of Welch's impersonation of Richard Dean Anderson's O'Neill, highlighting the later scenes involving both incarnations of O'Neill as being "particularly enjoyable and interesting".

Writing for The Futon Critic, Brian Ford Sullivan awarded the episode the 24th spot on his "The 50 Best Episodes of 2003" list praising Welch for getting "all of Anderson's mannerisms and voice inflections dead on perfect". Ford Sullivan also believed the episode "helped prove that despite Anderson's decreased presence on the show, O'Neill's presence can still be felt on a weekly basis." Kieran Dickson for Comet awarded the episode the position of 8th on his "10 Best Episodes of Stargate SG-1" and felt that the scenes between Welch and Anderson "produced some genuine laugh out loud moments". Keith R.A. DeCandido for Tor.com awarded the episode the runner-up spot for best episode of the season, praising Welch's impersonation of Anderson's O'Neill.

Fan response published on Stargate fansite Gateworld was less positive. Whilst praising Welch's performance, contributor Alli Snow felt as though young O'Neill's behaviours and actions were not in keeping with the established character, such as escaping Stargate Command and proceeding to go for a beer and questioning "would Jack really be so willing to leave behind the fight against the Goa'uld, the S.G.C., his friends and his entire life ... all for the chance to go to high school again?".

=== Home media ===
"Fragile Balance" was first released as part of the "Volume 32" region 2 DVD on February 2, 2004, along with previous episodes "Fallen", "Homecoming" and subsequent episode "Orpheus". It was then released as part of the complete Season 7 boxsets on October 19, 2004, in region 1 and February 28, 2005, in region 2. The episode, along with the rest of season 7 were first made available digitally in January 2008 through iTunes and Amazon Unbox. The episode, along with every other episode of the series, were made available to stream for the first time through Netflix in the USA on August 15, 2010. Derek Lowe shot and produced a behind the scenes look at the episode, "SG-1 Directors Series: Fragile Balance", which was released as part of DVD sets. Kindler and DeLuise provided audio commentary of the episode.
