= Orpheus Descending (The Killing) =

- The Killing episode
- Episode no.: Season 1 Episode 13
- Directed by: Brad Anderson
- Written by: Veena Sud; Nic Pizzolatto
- Production code: BDH112/S112
- Original air date: June 19, 2011

Guest appearances
- Tim Henry as Tad Marek; Camille Sullivan as Meg Connell; Kevin McNulty as Gas Station Manager; Liam James as Jack Linden

Episode chronology
← Previous "Beau Soleil"	Next → "Reflections"
- The Killing (season 1)

"Orpheus Descending" is the thirteenth episode of the American television drama series The Killing, which aired on June 19, 2011. The episode was co-written by Nic Pizzolatto and series creator Veena Sud, and directed by Brad Anderson. In the episode, the detectives investigate Darren Richmond’s involvement with Rosie Larsen. Mitch and Stan Larsen discuss their family's future. Belko Royce takes action to protect the Larsens.

== Plot ==
After a tense quiet moment with Sarah Linden (Mireille Enos) in his apartment, Darren Richmond (Billy Campbell) tells her about Orpheus, a man in Greek mythology who rescued his wife from the underworld, only to lose her forever, because he looked back while exiting. Sarah is able to leave without incident and tells Stephen Holder (Joel Kinnaman) that Richmond knows they are on to him. She adds that they still need to somehow connect Richmond to Rosie. They head for the police impound lot to thoroughly search the campaign car. She notices that the gas tank is nearly full. After looking over the car’s records, she decides that someone must have purchased gas for the car on the night Rosie disappeared.

Meanwhile, Terry Marek (Jamie Anne Allman) drives Stan Larsen (Brent Sexton) home from jail. He spots his wife Mitch (Michelle Forbes) watching from a second floor window and drives away in his pickup. The next morning, he wakes up in his truck at the cemetery near Rosie's grave. At home with her father (Tim Henry), Mitch looks at scrapbooks from her teenage years. They peruse an empty blank travel journal that lists the places she had hoped to go.

At the police station, Holder tells Sarah that 100 miles on the campaign car's odometer are not written in the records. They reason that Richmond drove the long way back from the casino via a bridge. She asks Holder to requisition footage from a tollbooth camera.

Richmond tells reporters from the campaign trail that rumors about his affairs are not justified. Taking his assistant, Gwen Eaton (Kristin Lehman), aside, he admits to unhealthy behavior following his wife’s Lily's death, but swears it ended when he and Gwen started dating.

Back at the station, Lieutenant Oakes (Garry Chalk) warns Sarah that she needs solid evidence to accuse the powerful Richmond. Holder shows her a newspaper that features Richmond's affairs with pictures, saying that the women all look like Rosie. They meet with Meg Connell (Camille Sullivan), Gwen's predecessor on Richmond's campaign. She admits to having an affair with Richmond. The detectives then check out gas stations along the casino route. Holder speculates that Richmond waited to refuel until his tank was nearly empty and suggests visiting a station near the park that is not on their list. The manager (Kevin McNulty) at a station bordering the park recalls the campaign car—and the screams of a girl before the driver sped away. Sarah deduces that Rosie broke free and escaped into the forest behind the station. Police soon arrive with search dogs to comb the forest. As they do, the detectives attempt to reconstruct Rosie's movements.

At City Hall, campaign manager Jamie Wright (Eric Ladin) tells Gwen that he respects her for doing her job, despite the revelations about Richmond. He later asks Richmond if there are any other secrets he needs to know. Richmond assures him that there is nothing to worry about.

Sarah directs the investigation to a fire road deeper in the forest, where Rosie's pink sneaker is later discovered. Sarah concludes that the killer blocked Rosie's path at the fire road. She tells Holder that, if Rosie had run the opposite way, the girl would have escaped. Sarah visits Richmond at work, accusing him of murdering Rosie. He denies hurting Rosie and asks Sarah why she is trying to destroy him. Unseen, Gwen stands nearby, as Richmond promises Sarah that he is telling the truth, using the same words and tone as he had with Gwen. Afterward, Gwen admits to Sarah that Richmond disappeared on the night Rosie was last seen. She adds that when he returned, near dawn, he was soaking wet. She hands Sarah a DVD.

At the police station with Oakes, Sarah shows him the video of Rosie shaking Richmond’s hand at a campaign event, adding that Gwen is no longer providing an alibi for him. Oakes says that Sarah needs to link Richmond and the car. Holder enters to show them a photo — security-camera footage showing Richmond in the car on a bridge at 3 a.m. Saturday morning. Sarah arrests Richmond at a campaign rally. He is fingerprinted at the police station. Sarah leaves the case paperwork to Holder.

After visiting the home he planned to buy for his family, Stan returns home. Mitch tells him that the way she has been feeling is not good for the boys. After she says the boys do not need her, Stan replies that he needs her. She cries, saying that the current house situation hurts her. Later, Terry and the boys return to the apartment. Stan tells her that Mitch has left.

At his home, listening to news of Richmond's arrest, Belko Royce (Brendan Sexton III) cleans a revolver. Sarah and her son Jack (Liam James) board a plane for California. As the plane sits at the gate, she receives a call from highway patrol telling her that the toll bridge's security cameras have been out of service for months. Elsewhere, Holder climbs into a sedan and tells the unseen driver that the photo worked and that Richmond was "going down." Gwen watches outside the police station as officers lead Richmond through a gathering of reporters and photographers. On the plane, Sarah sits in silence. As Richmond turns to enter a car, Belko approaches and aims a gun at him.

== Reception ==
"Orpheus Descending" received mixed to negative reviews from critics, and enormous backlash from viewers. TV Fanatic’s Sean McKenna gave the episode 3.5 out of 5 stars by saying it had "a shocking conclusion to an otherwise average episode (albeit disappointing for a season finale)." Meredith Blake of The A.V. Club rated this episode a D+, saying: "After 13 episodes, a dozen or so red herrings, and at least 4 different suspects, the first season of The Killing ends with a ludicrous cliffhanger."

The episode was watched by 2.32 million viewers, the highest rating since the first four episodes.

Series creator and episode writer Veena Sud addressed the public's reaction to the season finale and its misleading cliffhanger: "I am aware there's been both excitement and frustration around the twist at the end of this season. Our goal was not to mislead but rather to do something different, to take the time the story needs to fully unfold — to explore who Holder is and what's happened to Richmond, along with who killed Rosie Larsen." Sud promised in a later interview that in the second season, which begins April 2012, the killer of Rosie Larsen will be revealed, but not until the season's end.
