= Cruel and Unusual (2014 film) =

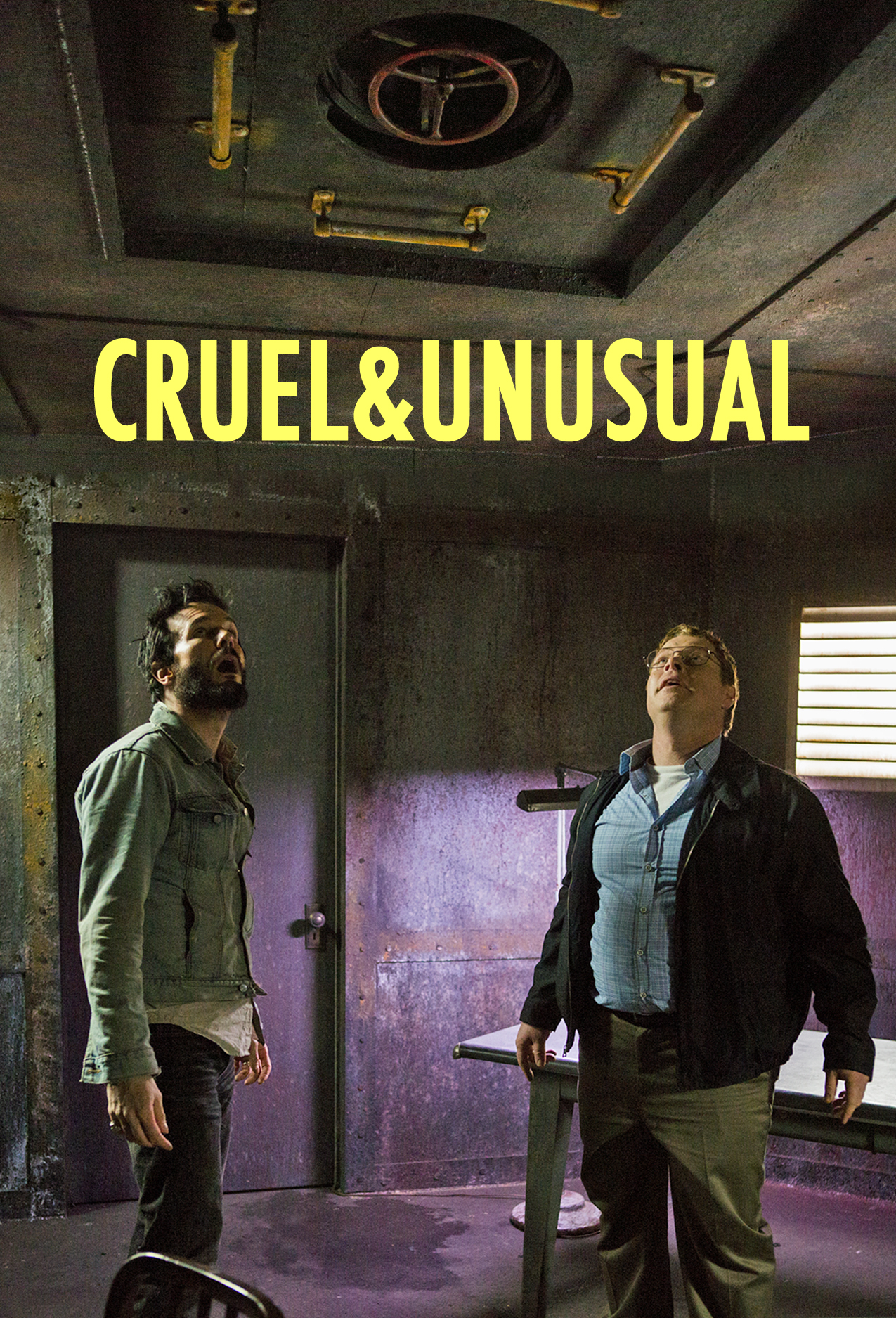
- Promotional poster
- Directed by: Merlin Dervisevic
- Written by: Merlin Dervisevic
- Produced by: Matthew Cervi
- Starring: David Richmond-Peck; Bernadette Saquibal; Michelle Harrison; Michael Eklund; Richard Harmon
- Cinematography: Adam Sliwinski
- Edited by: Michael John Bateman
- Music by: Mark Korven
- Production companies: Mad Samurai; Bare Knuckle Pictures
- Distributed by: Entertainment One
- Release dates: April 5, 2014 (Golden Horse); May 24, 2014 (Canada)
- Running time: 91 minutes
- Country: Canada
- Language: English
- Budget: $650,000

Cruel and Unusual is a 2014 Canadian surrealistic thriller film written and directed by Merlin Dervisevic in his feature debut. Starring David Richmond-Peck, Bernadette Saquibal, and Michelle Harrison, the film follows a man wrongly condemned for killing his wife, who finds himself in a mysterious institution where he is sentenced to relive her death for eternity. Distributed by Entertainment One in Canada and Candy Factory Films in the United States, the film was theatrically released on 24 May 2014.

== Plot ==
In their bathroom, Edgar desperately attempts to save his unresponsive wife, Maylon, a Filipino immigrant. Shortly after giving up, he dies, too. Suddenly driving his car down the road, Edgar pulls over in confusion. After he stumbles out of his car, he recognizes a tree without knowing why. He and Maylon argue briefly, then return to their house. Maylon is worried about her troubled teenage son, Gogan, who has not yet returned home. Edgar encourages her to be stricter and dismisses her concerns for Gogan's safety. Gogan briefly returns home but runs away after Edgar threatens to send him back to the Philippines to live with his father; Maylon chases after him. When she returns, Maylon makes Edgar soup. Edgar becomes ill, and Maylon calls an ambulance. When Edgar insists on calling them back himself to report his allergies, she refuses to give him the phone. In the resulting scuffle over the phone, Edgar accidentally kills Maylon, then collapses dead.

When Edgar wakes, he is in a large building. A figure on a television set, known as the Councillor, tells him he has murdered his wife and is now also dead. The Councillor orders him to report to group therapy with another televised person, the Facilitator. There, he meets Doris, Julien, and William, among others, all of whom are guilty of killing family members. Confused, Edgar denies he belongs there and says his wife's death was an accident. He is sent back to relive the same day, and, this time, he realises that Maylon has poisoned him. He again objects at group therapy, saying that he is the victim, not Maylon. In a discussion group, Julien says that he murdered his daughter and two boys, William says he murdered his parents, and Doris says she committed suicide. Edgar says that Doris and he do not belong with the others, but she rejects this. As Edgar once again relives his last day, he realises that he intentionally strangled Maylon.

Unable to face reliving that day any more, Edgar encourages the others to escape with him. William says he does not want to leave, but Julien agrees to help despite his fear of repercussions. After Doris creates a distraction for them, Edgar and Julien flee to the Councillor's office, where Edgar had previously noticed a hatch leading upward. Julien initially helps him reach the hatch, but then betrays him. Edgar reaches the hatch regardless, and, despite the protestations of the Councillor and Facilitator, enters it. There, he experiences the day from the point of view of Maylon, Gogan, and his brother. Maylon confides in Edgar's brother that she feels trapped and helpless because of Edgar's controlling and possessive behavior, and Gogan is bullied at school. When Gogan runs away, Maylon catches up with him, and they talk about Edgar's plan to send him back to the Philippines. Enraged that Edgar would tell Gogan that she agreed to the plan, she poisons Edgar.

Edgar abandons his plan to escape and now desires to change history. He pulls a reluctant Doris into his personal hell, where she assists him in deviating from the events of that day. Together, they secure Maylon in a locked room. Still poisoned, Edgar is horrified when he realises that Maylon will now be a murderer and subject to his fate, as her death at his hands had previously redeemed her. Doris recognises her children outside Edgar's house and becomes entranced with watching them, as her doppelganger prepares to commit suicide nearby from the same tree that Edgar recognised earlier. Edgar rushes to stop her doppelganger from committing suicide, and instead hangs himself in her noose. Reality shifts, and Doris realises that she has escaped the institution. Years later, she leads Maylon and Gogan to her tree, where they engage in a yearly ritual in which they place flowers on Edgar's grave. Back at the institution, Edgar welcomes a new member; the others advise him to avoid Edgar, as Edgar is disturbingly proud of his own suicide.

== Cast ==
- David Richmond-Peck as Edgar
- Bernadette Saquibal as Maylon
- Michelle Harrison as Doris
- Monsour Cataquiz as Gogan
- Kyle Cassie as Lance
- Mary Black as the Facilitator
- Michael Eklund as Julien
- Richard Harmon as William
- Andy Thompson as the Councillor
- John Hainsworth as the Old Man
- Jena Skodje as Rebecca
- Jared Ager-Foster as Tyler
- Fraser Kirkland as Ryan
- Christina Jastrzembska as Older Doris
- David Milchard as New Inmate

== Production ==
Shooting took place in Aldergrove, Coquitlam, and Langley, British Columbia, over fifteen days. The "hell" institution scenes were shot in the decommissioned Crease Clinic building at Riverview Hospital.

== Release ==
Cruel and Unusual premiered at the Taipei Golden Horse Film Festival, after which it received a distribution deal in Asia. The Canadian premiere was on 24 May 2014 in Vancouver.

== Reception ==
Ken Eisner of The Georgia Straight wrote that it "certainly has some clever turns" but "lacks humour and tonal variety". Katherine Monk of The Vancouver Sun rated it 2.5/5 stars and called it a "well-executed, if somewhat drab, existential fairy tale".
