= Beau Soleil (The Killing) =

- The Killing episode
- Episode no.: Season 1 Episode 12
- Directed by: Keith Gordon
- Written by: Jeremy Doner; Soo Hugh
- Production code: BDH111/S111
- Original air date: June 12, 2011

Guest appearances
- Katie Findlay as Rosie Larsen; Tom Butler as Mayor Lesley Adams; Colin Lawrence as Benjamin Abani; Alisen Down as Cami; Patrick Gilmore as Tom Drexler; Tahmoh Penikett as Greg Linden; Randal Edwards as Ray; Alona Tal as Aleena

Episode chronology
← Previous "Missing"	Next → "Orpheus Descending"
- The Killing (season 1)

"Beau Soleil" is the twelfth episode of the American television drama series The Killing, which aired on June 12, 2011. The episode is co-written by Jeremy Doner and Soo Hugh and is directed by Keith Gordon. In the episode, the detectives investigate the link between Rosie Larsen and casino camera footage. Mitch Larsen learns that her jailed husband, Stan, has drained their bank account. The Richmond campaign gets new life as the Mayor's takes a hit.

== Plot ==
At the police station, Detectives Sarah Linden (Mireille Enos) and Stephen Holder (Joel Kinnaman) review ATM camera screenshots from the casino. Rosie Larsen (Katie Findlay) can be seen wearing the pink sweater found in the park. Holder tells Sarah that, for six months, Rosie made large cash deposits at those ATMs, but not to her own account.

Construction workers at Mayor Lesley Adams' waterfront development project dig up a human skull. On behalf of the local Indian nation, Nicole Jackson (Claudia Ferri) speaks on television, saying that, because the waterfront development site may be on Indian burial grounds, construction must halt so anthropologists can check it out. Adams (Tom Butler) and his campaign manager, Benjamin Abani (Colin Lawrence), watch the broadcast, believing the news will end their campaign. At Darren Richmond's campaign office, his team celebrates the recent news. Campaign manager Jamie Wright (Eric Ladin) informs Richmond that Tom Drexler has offered an invitation to a celebratory party. Richmond (Billy Campbell) considers his business with Drexler closed and tells Wright to attend instead. Later, outside, Mayor Adams hands Gwen Eaton (Kristin Lehman), Richmond's assistant, an envelope, out of friendship to her family.

In the garage office, Mitch Larsen (Michelle Forbes) hears an answering machine from Janek Kovarsky. She asks Belko (Brendan Sexton III) if Stan is working for Janek again. He does not answer her and she fires him. Stan (Brent Sexton) calls from jail and leaves a message. He is required to talk to a therapist before posting bail. At the Larsen apartment, the detectives tell Terry (Jamie Anne Allman) that Rosie was making deposits to a bank account opened in Terry's name. She denies opening an account. Linden points out that Rosie would have needed Terry's identification to open the account. Terry then admits loaning her identification to Rosie, but only to get into a club. The detectives drive to an alley and show a picture of Rosie to Cami (Alisen Down), Holder's former coworker and undercover cop posing as a prostitute. Cami says the picture looks like a Beau Soleil girl, a high-end escort, and mentions that a customer roughed up one of them during the summer.

Jamie arrives at Drexler's penthouse. He tells him that the girls swimming in the pool look like high-schoolers. Drexler (Patrick Gilmore) retorts that the girls from Beau Soleil are discreet.

Mitch visits Stan in jail, telling him that she did not post bail because they have no money. As he tries to explain, she growls at him for returning to his old ways and dealing with Janek. He blames her for being the reason that he is in jail.

At the police station, Holder tells Linden that the description of the person who beat the escort matches Drexler, who has a police record for soliciting prostitutes. Jack's father, Greg (Tahmoh Penikett), appears and asks Sarah Linden if he can see their son again. She threatens to have him arrested for kidnapping. Ray (Randal Edwards), a police tech, shows the detectives the Beau Soleil website that was accessed multiple times from Rosie's laptop computer — the last access time was the Wednesday before Rosie disappeared. The escorts' faces are not visible on the site, but Sarah recognizes a jacket as one that Terry has been wearing. They visit her at a pub where she works. She admits being a Beau Soleil escort and to having used Rosie's computer to access their website, but denies using it on the day in question. She also recalls that an escort named Celine warned other escorts about a customer using the pseudonym "Orpheus," who drove her to the waterfront and discussed drowning. The detectives visit a storefront housing the Beau Soleil website's servers. After Holder threatens the webmaster, he retrieves Celine's post about Orpheus and reveals her true name: Aleena. He also retrieves Orpheus's email address, adding that the account was closed, and its files erased, at 4 a.m. on the night Rosie disappeared.

At the jail, Stan tells the therapist of a dream in which he returns home and finds that some other guy has taken his place. In Stan's office, Mitch informs Terry that she's not posting Stan's bail because he gambled away their money. After arguing about family and Rosie, Terry tells her that she did not even know Rosie. Later, Terry posts Stan's bail and he is released.

At the police station, Linden sends Orpheus an e-mail with the lure of knowing what he did. Posing as a Beau Soleil client, Holder meets Aleena (Alona Tal) at a hotel. He shows her Rosie's crime-scene photos, describing Aleena's encounter with Orpheus as a rehearsal. She mentions that Orpheus was a sweet yet sad person. Holder mentions Drexler's name, and she leaves, refusing to answer any more questions. She later calls him, asking for police protection. After he agrees, she gives him an address to find out who Orpheus is.

Linden asks a technician, Ray, to monitor her computer for a response from Orpheus while she is away from her desk. She then visits Darren Richmond at his apartment to advise him to cut ties with Drexler. He excuses himself to take a phone call. Linden also receives a call. Ray tells her that Orpheus has read her e-mail. She asks Ray to send the e-mail again, then hears an audible alert on a nearby computer. At her request, Ray sends the e-mail three more times, and each time she hears the audible alert. Following the sound to Richmond's computer, she sees his open e-mail account on the screen and reads her four consecutive lures. Richmond enters to find her at his computer, just as Holder arrives at the address that Aleena has given him. She is not there, but he sees numerous campaign posters of Darren Richmond on a nearby wall.

Meanwhile, in Richmond's office, Gwen Eaton looks at photographs from the envelope Adams handed her. They are candid photos of Richmond with a number of different women in intimate settings.

== Reception ==
"Beau Soleil" received mixed reviews. Sean McKenna of TV Fanatic gave the episode five stars, stating: "After 12 episodes, The Killing has maintained its fresh take on the crime drama that departs from the fast paced worlds of shows like CSI. This series has managed to weave together interesting characters and drama while surrounding them with a murder mystery that finds both equally important." However, Meredith Blake of The A.V. Club rated this episode a C+, saying: 'The problem with The Killing is that the writing is at least as haphazard as Linden and Holder's detective work, and the show provides little else — in the form of likable, compelling characters or novel scenarios — to distract us from the [Swiss]-cheese-esque plot."

The episode was watched by 1.83 million viewers, a notable drop from the previous episode.
