= Lily Frost =

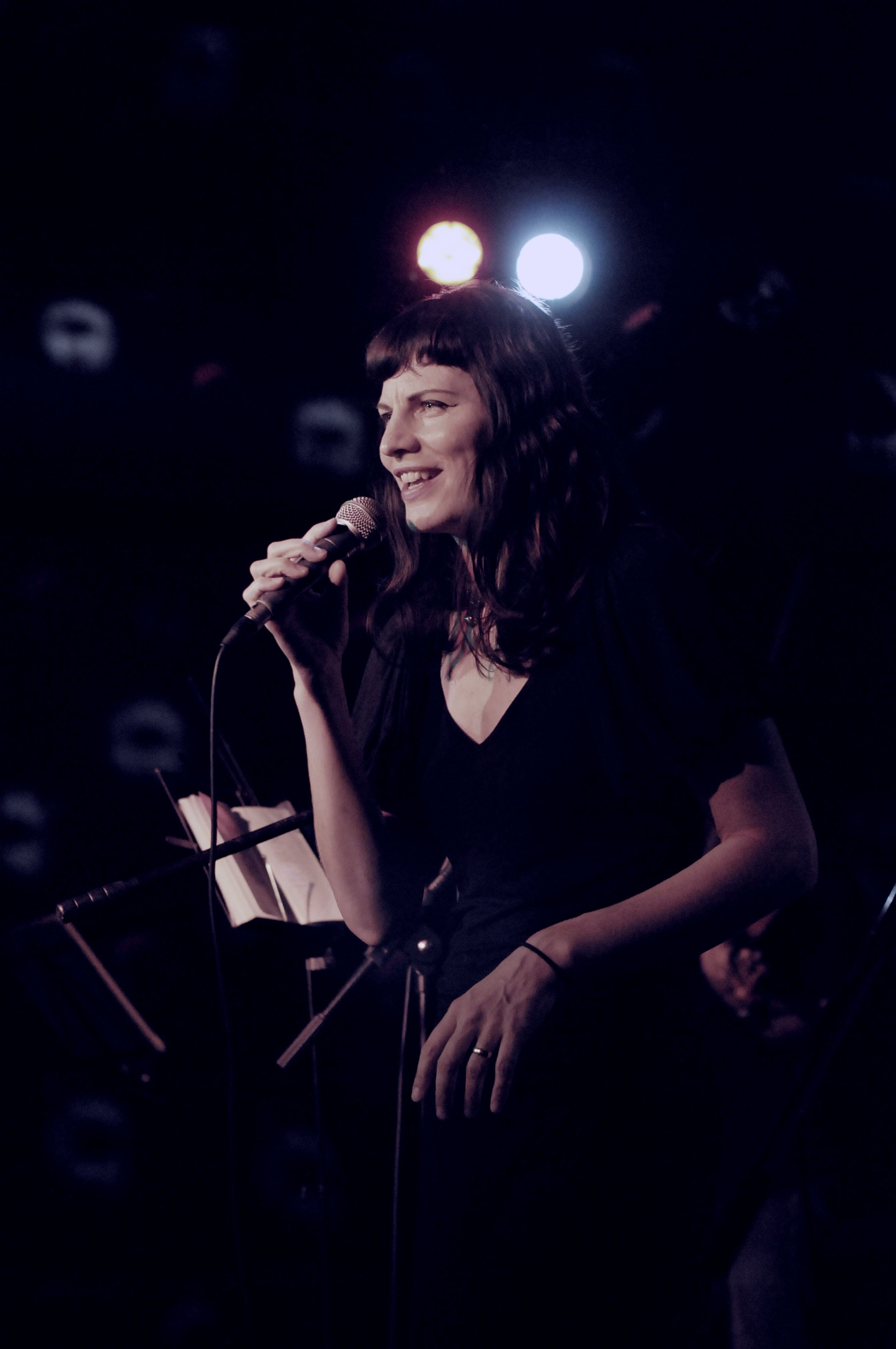

Background information
- Origin: Toronto, Ontario, Canada
- Genres: Pop / Cabaret / Western Swing
- Years active: 1989-present
- Label: EMI / Netwerkk / Aporia / Marquis
- Website: www.lilyfrost.com

Audio
- "Who Am I (Lunamarium)" on YouTube

Lily Frost, born Lindsey Frost Davis, is a Canadian independent singer-songwriter from Toronto, Ontario. Bilingual in French and English, she is a cross-genre, multi disciplinary singer/songwriter/performer and recording artist.

Born in Toronto, she studied jazz at Concordia University in Montreal and honed her craft in Vancouver as the lead singer of the lounge band The Colorifics, signing as a solo artist to Nettwerk Records. She moved back to Toronto where she has released several records with Aporia/Outside and two with Marquis/EMI, as well as her most recent self-released album, Retro-Moderne.

== Career ==
Born Lindsey Frost Davis, Lily Frost is a Toronto-based singer, composer and producer.

Frost studied at the Royal Conservatory of Music in Toronto, beginning with piano at age 7. She then studied ballet, tap, modern and jazz dance. Her family spent summers in Lake Huron where she and her older cousin, Canadian singer-songwriter and alt hip-hop artist Kinnie Starr began singing together.

Lily went to Concordia University in Montreal in 1989 to study jazz. She met South American composer Jorge Diaz de Bedoya who introduced her to the sounds of Bossa Nova, Serge Gainsbourg and ‘Tropicalia’, all of which influenced her writing. She left Concordia after two years to work full-time as a singer-songwriter, performer and recording artist.

Lily and Jorge Diaz de Bedoya wrote and performed in Montreal in various groups including Les Minstrels. Lily met John Davis of The Gruesomes at Montreal’s Cheap Thrills record store who asked Lily to audition for a band called The Shieks. Her first show with The Sheiks was at The Rockaway Revue in Montreal. They went on to play at Club Soda, Station 10 and Les Foufounes Electriques. Lily performed with John Davis, Bobby Beaton, Phil Giaro and Dave Lachance, and co-wrote with Phil Giaro a cassette of originals and covers called The Recession Blues.

In 1991 she moved to Cairo, Egypt for six months, singing in a piano bar with Berkley-trained jazz pianist Rashad Fahim.

In 1993, Lily began to sing as the featured vocalist for Ray Condo and The Swinging Dukes in Vancouver. When he died in 2004, Lily paid homage with her album Lily Swings, an album of Billie Holiday songs done western-swing-style with Ray’s band The Swinging Dukes. The album was recorded in Vancouver with Rick Kilburn and mixed in Toronto by Jose Contreras. A second album, Too Hot For Words, was made. Both were distributed by Marquis/EMI and produced by Jose Contreras. Lily and her band appeared at the Montreal Jazz Festival and the Massey Hall Women in Blues Revue.

In 1992 Lily moved to Vancouver where she reunited with Jorge Diaz de Bedoya and several other Montreal-based musicians. They performed as The Colorifics, a popular Vancouver lounge band. The original lineup was Lily Frost, Jorge Diaz, Dave Lachance and Bernie Boulanger (of the band, Rattled Roosters). The Colorifics released three original albums - Girlie Door, Guilty Pleasure and Living City.

Nettwerk Records signed Frost as a solo artist for the album Lunamarium, with her single from the album Who Am I appearing on the soundtrack for the feature film Crazy/Beautiful.

Frost was awarded West Coast Vocalist of the Year in 2003, and opened for Coldplay, The Dandy Warhols, Blue Rodeo, Cowboy Junkies, and toured with Au Revoir Simone, The Flashing Lights, Neko Case and Hawksley Workman. Upon her return to Toronto, Frost met and married Chilean-born singer/songwriter José Miguel Contreras of By Divine Right in 2004, resulting in a further immersion in Latin American music and culture, which permeated many of her recordings including You’ve Shaken Every Part of Me - co-written with José Miguel Contreras. They went on to write, record, produce, engineer and perform her next five records together. Lily was signed to Aporia Publishing who distributed her releases: Situation, Cine-Magique, Viridian Torch, Flights of Fancy, Do What You Love, Rebound Bitch, Motherless Child. The video for Silver Sun was directed by James Genn, and won Bravo's video of the year award. Cine-Magique was released in France by Boxton Records, and Lily toured France several times, appearing at Les Femmes S'en Meulent festival and solo gigs.

In 2009 Lily and Trevor Yuile co-wrote the theme song and score "All I Ever Wanted to Be" for the popular CBC TV series Being Erica which was nominated for a Gemini Award. She has had her songs appear in Grey’s Anatomy, Crazy/Beautiful OST, Workin' Moms, Charmed, Felicity, Stargate SG-1, MTV’s The City and in ads for Chevrolet and Hudsons Bay.

In 2015 Michael Feinstein invited Lily to perform live in studio for NPR NYC after the release of her single Motherless Child.

In 2016 Lily released original singles with Aporia Records and worked as a staff writer for the label, leading to co-writing in Toronto, Nashville and Los Angeles with Chris Unck (Pink), Eleni Mandell, Skye Machine, Dreamspeed (Beatchild, Slakah the Beatchild), writing for artist Chloe Watkinson and with others like Myshkin Warbler, Matt Lipscombe (Me Mom and Morgantaler), Jane Bach, Benita Hill, Adam Searan, Tom McKay (Joydrop), James Di Salvio (Bran Van 3000).

In 2017 Lily released the album Rebound on the Aporia label.

In 2019 Lily released an independent album, Retro-Moderne. Produced in NYC with Gus Van Go, the record has a 60’s sound with girl group back-ups, spaghetti western guitars, live and programmed drums and hofner bass supporting Lily’s cool yarn-spinning voice.

== Television ==
Frost co-wrote the theme song entitled "All I Ever Wanted to Be" for the Being Erica tv series.

Her song "Enchantment" (from Cine-Magique album) was featured: on a third season episode of Grey's Anatomy tv series, on the third episode of the CBC show Being Erica tv series, and in a 2007 commercial for The Bay department stores.

Her song "Who Am I" (from Lunamarium album) was featured: on the season 7 episode "Fragile Balance" of Stargate SG-1 tv series, on the season 4 episode "Hell Hath No Fury" of Charmed tv series, and on the soundtrack of 2001 Crazy/Beautiful film.

Her song "Two of Us" was featured in a 2007 Chevy Cobalt commercial.

Her song "Where is Love" (from Situation album) has been featured in 15/Love tv series several times.

Her song "You've Shaken Every Part of Me" (from Cine-Magique album) was featured on an episode of The City tv series.

“Do What You Love” was played as the ending track for each episode of the Danish miniseries ‘’Hjørdis’’.

== Discography ==
=== Albums ===
==== The Colorifics ====
- Girlie Door
- Guilty Pleasures
- Living City (1996)

==== Solo ====
- Cosmicomic Country (2000)
- Lunamarium (2001)
- Situation (2004)
- Cine-Magique (2006)
- Lily Swings (2008)
- Viridian Torch (2010)
- Do What You Love (2012)
- Too Hot For Words (2015)
- Retro-Moderne (2019)
- Decompression (2022)

=== EPs ===
- Flights of Fancy (2007)
- Motherless Child (2014)
- Rebound (2017)

=== Singles ===
- Motherless Child (2014)
- Cure For Loneliness (2021)
- Limelight (2021)

== Tours ==
- Canada, USA, France, UK, Egypt
