= Mysterious Ways (TV series) =

2000 drama series

- Genre: Science fiction
- Created by: Peter O'Fallon
- Written by: Peter O'Fallon; Carl Binder; Dawn Ritchie; Steven Barwin; Melissa Byer; Treena Hancock; Barbara Covington
- Starring: Adrian Pasdar; Rae Dawn Chong; Alisen Down
- Countries of origin: Canada; United States
- No. of seasons: 2
- No. of episodes: 44

Production
- Production companies: Crescent Entertainment; Lions Gate Television; Paxson Entertainment

Original release
- Network: NBC; PAX TV
- Release: July 24, 2000 – May 14, 2002

Mysterious Ways is a television science fiction drama series. It premiered on July 24, 2000, on NBC, before being aired intermittently on NBC through August 2001. The series also began airing on PAX TV in August 2000, ultimately moving to PAX TV after the series was dropped by NBC. It was produced in-house by Paxson Entertainment, in association with Lions Gate Television and CTV. It was cancelled in 2002 after two seasons.

== Plot ==
The series focuses on the search for explanations of, and evidence for, seemingly miraculous phenomena. This search is carried out by the protagonist Declan Dunn (Adrian Pasdar). Declan is a professor of anthropology at the Northern University of Oregon and is often compared with Indiana Jones due to his energetic enthusiasm for solving a mystery. His passion for miraculous events has its roots in a self-experienced mischance of being caught in an avalanche and getting out alive. He considers this to be miraculous and attributes it as the turning point in his life. In several episodes he makes references to this event and the impact it had on his life.

Always ready to help out with the research, though sometimes they appear slightly reluctant, are Declan's close friends Dr. Peggy Fowler (Rae Dawn Chong), a psychiatrist at a nearby hospital, and Miranda Feigelstein (Alisen Down), a physics graduate student and Declan's research assistant. Peggy is the most levelheaded of the three and is generally the one presenting the mundane alternatives to Declan's theories. Her so-called "rational explanations" often provide no explanation whatsoever, e.g. "It was just a freak occurrence".

Often being assigned to carry out tests of various substances, or operating a range of instruments, is Miranda. She is the second skeptic besides Peggy, with a somber and introvert personality, sometimes with moments of joking banter or sarcastic comments. In the episodes "The Ties That Bind" (1.08) and "Free Spirit" (2.14) another, more open side of her is shown before her social peers, if only temporarily. Being the quiet personality, Miranda is sometimes somewhat of a mystery even to her best friends.

In many cases the episodes conclude with a rational explanation being seemingly validated, then disproven at the last minute; thus leaving the question of paranormal activity open once more.

== Cast ==
The cast of Mysterious Ways

- Adrian Pasdar as Declan Dunn, the main character of the series. Declan is a Professor of Anthropology at Northern University in Oregon. While skiing, he was caught up in an avalanche. He was left for dead, but miraculously made it out alive. Ever since this incident, Declan has dedicated a large part of his free time to investigating miracles that occur around or to certain individuals in the hopes that it will bring some perspective to the miracle that saved his life. He is assisted in his investigations by his close friends Dr. Peggy Fowler, a psychiatrist, and Miranda Feigelstein, Declan's assistant. Both of these women are strong skeptics and, although they rarely turn down helping Declan, they always attempt to use science to explain the events that surround the miraculous phenomena. Declan has a wry sense of humor that he uses to make jokes even in the face of strange phenomena.
- Rae Dawn Chong as Dr. Peggy Fowler, a smart and open psychiatrist who helps victims of strange and unusual events cope with their feelings. Although having a relatively cheerful personality, Peggy is still haunted by her husbands' death and because of this event, no longer believes in miracles but in people. Despite her beliefs, she nearly always helps Declan whenever he requests it, her connections at the hospital being a great help to Declan and his investigations. She often attempts to disprove Declan's theories and is confused and elated when she cannot explain the miracles she witnesses.
- Alisen Down as Miranda Feigelstein, assistant to Declan and physics graduate student, Miranda is sarcastic, intelligent and slightly unimpressed. Like her friend Peggy, Miranda has little belief in miracles and nearly always has a contrary position to Declan's theories. Despite this, Miranda is very loyal to Declan and always has time to listen to him and his theories. Their relationship is very special, Declan seemingly being the only one to bring Miranda out of her shell.

== Production ==
Mysterious Ways was created by Peter O'Fallon, who wanted a science-fiction drama that was family-friendly and allowed him to explore humanistic themes. U2's song of the same name inspired the series' title.

For O'Fallon, the series' move from NBC to PAX TV was a good development, since it allowed for total creative freedom.

== Episodes ==
=== Season 1 (2000–01) ===
| No. overall | No. in season | Title | Directed by | Written by | Original release date | Prod. code |
|---|---|---|---|---|---|---|
| 1 | 1 | "Amazing Grace" | Carl Binder | Story: Peter O'Fallon; Teleplay: Peter O'Fallon, Joel Fields, Carl Binder | July 24, 2000 | 101 |
| 2 | 2 | "The Gray Lady" | Carl Binder | Peter O'Fallon | July 31, 2000 | 102 |
| 3 | 3 | "The Midas Touch" | Alan Simmonds | Treena Hancock, Melissa R. Byer | August 7, 2000 | 104 |
| 4 | 4 | "Camp Sanopi" | Michael Robison | Carl Binder | August 14, 2000 | 105 |
| 5 | 5 | "Spirit Junction" | Steve Anker | Dawn Ritchie | August 21, 2000 | 107 |
| 6 | 6 | "Twins" | Anne Wheeler | Barbara Covington | August 28, 2000 | 103 |
| 7 | 7 | "Crazy" | Alan Simmonds | Barbara Covington | September 4, 2000 | 106 |
| 8 | 8 | "The Ties That Bind" | Ken Jubenvill | Treena Hancock, Melissa R. Byer | September 11, 2000 | 108 |
| 9 | 9 | "Demons" | Allan Kroeker | Gabriel David Tick, Steven Barwin | September 12, 2000 | 109 |
| 10 | 10 | "Crystal Clear" | Brad Turner | Philip Gerson | November 7, 2000 | 113 |
| 11 | 11 | "Stranger in the Mirror" | Ken Jubenvill | Eric Tuchman | November 14, 2000 | 111 |
| 12 | 12 | "Handshake" | Michael Rohl | Carey Hayes, Chad Hayes | November 21, 2000 | 116 |
| 13 | 13 | "Intentions" | Rick Stevenson | Barbara Covington | November 28, 2000 | 110 |
| 14 | 14 | "Reason to Cry" | Brad Turner | Barbara Covington | December 19, 2000 | 115 |
| 15 | 15 | "The Greater Good" | Charles Winkler | Treena Hancock, Melissa R. Byer | January 1, 2001 | 117 |
| 16 | 16 | "Yesterday" | Michael Robison | Carl Binder | January 8, 2001 | 121 |
| 17 | 17 | "19A" | Alan Simmonds | Treena Hancock, Melissa R. Byer | January 9, 2001 | 112 |
| 18 | 18 | "Strike Two" | Ken Jubenvill | Dawn Ritchie | January 15, 2001 | 114 |
| 19 | 19 | "Dead Dog Walking" | Peter O'Fallon | Dawn Ritchie | January 22, 2001 | 119 |
| 20 | 20 | "Wonderful" | Ken Jubenvill | Eric Tuchman | January 29, 2001 | 122 |
| 21 | 21 | "Do You See What I See?" | Rick Stevenson | Eric Tuchman | February 6, 2001 | 118 |
| 22 | 22 | "John Doe #28" | Scott Williams | Treena Hancock, Melissa R. Byer | May 1, 2001 | 120 |

=== Season 2 (2001–02) ===
| No. overall | No. in season | Title | Directed by | Written by | Original release date | Prod. code |
|---|---|---|---|---|---|---|
| 23 | 1 | "Phoenix" | Michael Robison | Carl Binder | July 13, 2001 | 201 |
| 24 | 2 | "One of Us" | Michael Robison | Melissa R. Byer, Treena Hancock | July 20, 2001 | 205 |
| 25 | 3 | "Pure of Heart" | Rick Stevenson | Barbara Covington | July 27, 2001 | 204 |
| 26 | 4 | "Condemned" | Michael Robison | Dawn Ritchie, Carl Binder | August 3, 2001 | 207 |
| 27 | 5 | "Lost Souls" | Richard Martin | Melissa R. Byer, Treena Hancock | September 4, 2001 | 210 |
| 28 | 6 | "Spike" | Rick Stevenson | Eric Tuchman | September 18, 2001 | 202 |
| 29 | 7 | "Child of Wonder" | Ken Jubenvill | Eric Tuchman | October 2, 2001 | 206 |
| 30 | 8 | "29" | Ken Jubenvill | Deborah Starr Seibel | October 9, 2001 | 208 |
| 31 | 9 | "Love's Divine" | Scott Williams | John Mandel | October 16, 2001 | 209 |
| 32 | 10 | "The Big Picture" | Ken Jubenvill | Philip Gerson | November 6, 2001 | 211 |
| 33 | 11 | "A Time to Every Purpose" | Gil Shilton | Barbara Covington | November 13, 2001 | 212 |
| 34 | 12 | "Doctor in the House" | Brad Turner | Philip Gerson | November 27, 2001 | 203 |
| 35 | 13 | "The Last Dance" | Ken Jubenvill | Dan D'Amelio | December 11, 2001 | 213 |
| 36 | 14 | "Free Spirit" | Ken Jubenvill | Eric Tuchman | January 15, 2002 | 214 |
| 37 | 15 | "Spark of Life" | Rick Stevenson | Melissa R. Byer, Treena Hancock | January 22, 2002 | 220 |
| 38 | 16 | "Face in the Crowd" | M. Robison | Barbara Covington | February 5, 2002 | 222 |
| 39 | 17 | "Logan Miller" | Richard Martin | Barbara Covington | February 26, 2002 | 217 |
| 40 | 18 | "Friends in Need" | Ken Jubenvill | Eric Tuchman | March 19, 2002 | 218 |
| 41 | 19 | "A Man of God" | Brad Turner | Carl Binder | March 26, 2002 | 219 |
| 42 | 20 | "MUTI" | Michael Robison | Treena Hancock, Melissa R. Byer | April 30, 2002 | 215 |
| 43 | 21 | "Listen" | Scott Williams | Deborah Starr Seibel | May 7, 2002 | 221 |
| 44 | 22 | "Something Fishy" | Scott Williams | Carl Binder | May 14, 2002 | 216 |

== Broadcast ==
The show's first eight episodes aired in the United States on NBC starting July 2000. The show returned in January 2001 and later on July of the same year, before being pulled in August due to poor ratings. Meanwhile, PAX TV, a channel NBC had a 32% interest in, began broadcasting the show in August 2000, airing through the summer months. PAX would become the show's home for the rest of its run, until September 2002.

The series had seen success internationally, even after its cancellation. It currently airs in syndication on VisionTV in Canada.
