= Alisen Down =

Canadian film and television actress

- Born: Alisen Down; January 3, 1976 (age 50); Langley, British Columbia, Canada
- Occupation: Actress
- Years active: 1998–present
- Spouse(s): David Richmond-Peck (m. 20??)
- Children: 1

Alisen Down (born 3 January 1976) is a Canadian film and television actress. She is known for her roles as Miranda Feigelsteen in the paranormal drama series Mysterious Ways (2000—2002) and as Olivia Kirschner in the Syfy series 12 Monkeys (2015—2018).

== Biography ==
Down was born in Langley, British Columbia. She showed an interest for acting early, and during her younger years she used to write and produce her own plays. After she graduated from H. D. Stafford Secondary School, Down studied at the American Academy of Dramatic Arts in California, and then the British American Dramatic Academy in Oxford. She is married to actor David Richmond-Peck, whom she met while working on the series Robson Arms; the couple have a son together.

Down's best known role is most likely Miranda, a physics graduate student who tries to solve a range of mysterious or paranormal events together with Professor Declan Dunn (often the enthusiast behind the investigations) and psychiatrist Dr. Peggy Fowler (the other skeptic besides Miranda), in the TV series Mysterious Ways. Another high-profile role was that of Jean Barolay in the re-imagined Battlestar Galactica series.

== Filmography ==
=== Film ===
Year	Title	Role	Notes
1999	Late Night Sessions	Candy	
1999	Bad Money	Sylvia Baines	
2000	A Good Burn	Chet	
2005	The Little Things	Claire	Short film
2008	Control Alt Delete	Angela	
2008	The Day the Earth Stood Still	Laptop Woman	
2009	Case 39	Emily's Mother	
2010	Paradox	Helen	
2010	Father&Sons	Waitress	
2010	Move Out Clean	Laura	Short film
2011	Colouring on the Walls	Alice	Short film
2011	The Money Pet	Dr. S. White	Short film

=== Television ===
Year	Title	Role	Notes
1998–2005	Da Vinci's Inquest	Adele Corbett	Episode: "The Quality of Mercy"
1999–2000	Cold Squad	Anita Dunn	4 episodes
2000	Da Vinci's Inquest	Ruby	Episode: "Bang Like That"
2000–2002	Mysterious Ways	Miranda Feigelsteen	Main cast
2002	The Dead Zone	Young Rosie O'Halloran	Episode: "Enigma"
2003–2005	Da Vinci's Inquest	Dr. Maria Donato	Recurring role (seasons 6–8)
2004	Stargate SG-1	Dr. Brightman	Episode: "Lockdown"
2004	The Life	Crystal	TV movie
2004–2008	Smallville	Lillian Luthor	5 episodes
2005	Tripping the Wire: A Stephen Tree Mystery	Laura Wing	TV movie
2005	The L Word	Priscillia	Episode: "Labyrinth"
2005	Killer Instincts	Cleo / Lesley	Episode: "Die Like an Egyptian"
2005–2008	Robson Arms	Sault Ste. Marie	Main cast
2006	This Space for Rent	Michael-Anne Sutton	Premise pilot, not picked up to series
2006	The Collector	Female Russian Spy / The Devil	Episode: "The Spy"
2006	Whistler	Wren Jolinski	Episode: "After the Fall"
2006	Battlestar Galactica: The Resistance	Jean Barolay	Web series, 4 webisodes
2006–2008	Battlestar Galactica	Jean Barolay	8 episodes
2008	Stargate: The Ark of Truth	Alteran Woman	TV movie
2009	Flashpoint	Hannah	Episode: "Backwards Day"
2009	Battlestar Galactica: The Plan	Jean Barolay	TV movie
2010	Stargate Universe	Dr. Brightman	4 episodes
2010	R.L. Stine's The Haunting Hour	Jill	2 episodes
2010	On Strike for Christmas	Debbie	TV movie
2010	Shattered	Linda Rousso	2 episodes
2011	The Killing	Cami	Episode: "Beau Soleil"
2011	Past Obsessions	Meg	TV movie
2011	Chaos	Dr. Sheila Levine	Episode: "Mincemeat"
2011	Lost Girl	Wife	Episode: "Barometz. Trick. Pressure"
2012, 2015	Lost Girl	Isabeau	2 episodes
2012	Murdoch Mysteries	Lydia	Episode: "Murdoch Night in Canada"
2013	Supernatural	Alice Cassity	Episode: "Trial and Error"
2013	Cracked	Jessica Paxton	Episode: "The Hold Out"
2014	Darknet	Beth	Episode: "Darknet 4"
2014	Transporter: The Series	Pamela Wolfe	Episode: "Chimera"
2014	Haven	Janet	Episode: "Reflections"
2014	Gracepoint	Kathy Eaton	Recurring role
2015–2018	12 Monkeys	Striking Woman/Olivia/The Witness	Recurring role
2017	Supernatural	Penny Rader	Episode: "Advanced Thanatology"
2017	Perfect Citizen	Carla Cooper	TV movie
2019	Cardinal		Episode: "Robert"
2019	Star Trek: Discovery	Starfleet Psychiatrist	2 episodes
2021–2025	Ginny & Georgia	Bev	Recurring role (seasons 1–3)

== Awards/Nominations ==
Awards
Year	Award	Category	Production	Result	Ref.
2000	Gemini	Best Performance by an Actress in a Guest Role in a Dramatic Series	Da Vinci's Inquest ("Bang Like That")	Nominated	
2000	Gemini	Best Performance by an Actress in a Guest Role in a Dramatic Series	Cold Squad ("Deadbeat Walking")	Won	
2000	Leo	Best Performance by a Female in a Dramatic Series	Cold Squad ("Deadbeat Walking")	Won	
2001	Leo	Best Performance by a Female: Dramatic Series	Mysterious Ways ("Ties That Bind")	Nominated	
2002	Leo	Dramatic Series: Best Lead Performance - Female	Mysterious Ways ("Free Spirit")	Nominated	
2005	Leo	Dramatic Series: Best Supporting Performance by a Female	Robson Arms ("Hairpiece of Mind")	Nominated	
2005	Gemini	Best Performance by an Actress in a Leading Role in a Dramatic Program or Miniseries	The Life	Nominated	
2007	Leo	Best Supporting Performance by a Female in a Dramatic Series	Robson Arms ("Misery Inc.")	Nominated	
