= David Richmond-Peck =

Canadian actor (born 1974)

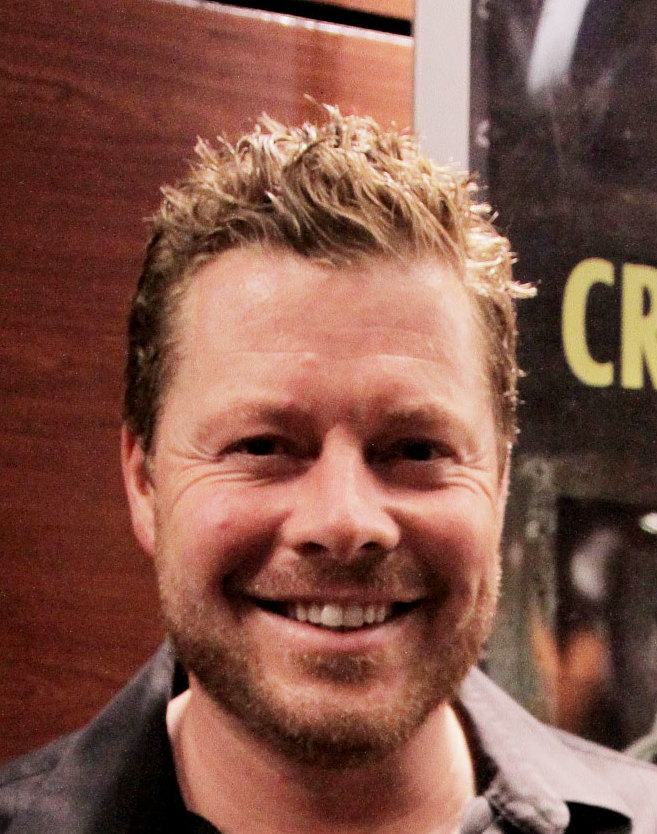
- Richmond-Peck at the Cruel and Unusual premiere screening in Vancouver May 27, 2014
- Born: April 5, 1974 (age 51); Oakville, Ontario, Canada
- Years active: 2000 – present
- Spouse: Alisen Down

David Richmond-Peck (born April 5, 1974) is a Canadian actor who has appeared in over 70 film and television roles in Canada and the United States since 2000.

== Career ==
Richmond-Peck won two Leo Awards: in 2006 for Behind the Camera: The Unauthorized Story of Mork and Mindy and in 2010 for his acting in the short film Instant.

== Personal life ==
Richmond-Peck was born in Oakville, Ontario. He graduated from Appleby College in 1992, later attending the University of Western Ontario where he was a member of Beta Theta Pi. He studied acting at Studio 58 in Vancouver.

Richmond-Peck is married to Canadian actress Alisen Down. David has two children named Lucas Gregory Blair Richmond-Peck and Elijah David Tayes Richmond-Peck.

== Filmography ==
Year	Title	Role	Notes
2004	Desolation: A Comedy	Thomas Hardy	
2005	Fantastic Four	Gallery Patron	
2006	She's the Man	Referee	
2007	Married Life	Tom	
2008	The Day the Earth Stood Still	Polygraph Operator	
2009	The Zero Sum	Patrick Paulson	
2009	2012	Political Aide	Uncredited
2009	Kick Me Down	Percy Crease	
2009	Beyond Sherwood Forest	Prince John	
2010	Paradox	Andrew Ebbetts	
2010	Smokin' Aces 2: Assassins' Ball	FBI Special Agent Dominic Dumare	
2011	Rise of the Planet of the Apes	Board Member #1	
2011	The House	Darrel Howe	
2013	Pacific Rim	Canadian UN Representative	
2013	The Privileged	Don Lynley	
2014	Cruel and Unusual	Edgar	
2015	He Never Died	Steve	
2015	Hyena Road	Hickey	
2016	Unless	Detective	
