= Obi Ndefo =

American actor (1972–2024)

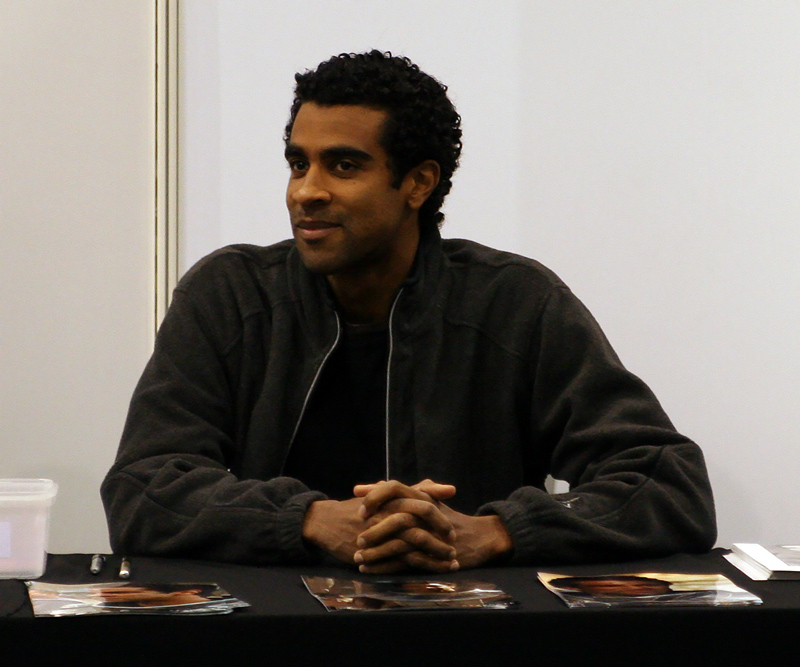
- Obi in 2006
- Born: Obiora Anthony Ndefo; October 29, 1972; Los Angeles, California, U.S.
- Died: August 28, 2024 (aged 51); Los Angeles, California, U.S.
- Education: Yale University
- Occupation: Television actor

Obiora Anthony Ndefo (October 29, 1972 – August 28, 2024) was an American actor and yoga teacher, best known as Bodie Wells on the television drama Dawson's Creek, and for his recurring role as Rak'nor in Stargate SG-1.

== Early life and career ==
Obiora Anthony Ndefo was born in Los Angeles on October 29, 1972, to a Nigerian father and an Ashkenazi Jewish mother. He was a graduate of Yale University's drama school. Ndefo appeared in episodes of the television series: Angel, The West Wing, The Jamie Foxx Show, Stargate SG-1, 3rd Rock from the Sun, Half & Half, Crossing Jordan, Star Trek: Deep Space Nine and Star Trek: Voyager.

He was the founder of the Los Angeles-based non-profit 'Arts Alliance for Humanity', which supports keeping arts education in public schools and communities. He was also a writer, yoga teacher and a founder of a non-profit fostering the arts and societal wellness.

== Personal life and death ==
In August 2019, Ndefo was in a grocery store parking lot when he was struck by a car whose driver was intoxicated. After the collision, Ndefo lost both legs above the knee.

Ndefo died on August 28, 2024, at the age of 51. Ndefo's sister Nkem stated Obi died of the eating disorder orthorexia.

== Filmography ==
Year	Title	Role	Notes
1995	Star Trek: Deep Space Nine	Drex	Episode “Way of the Warrior”
1995	The Wayans Bros.	Delroy Jones	Episode “Think Fast”
1996	The Jamie Foxx Show	Adrian	Episode “Burned Twice by the Same Flame”
1998–2002	Dawson's Creek	Bodie Wells	10 episodes
1998	3rd Rock from the Sun	Eric	Episode “What's Love Got to Do, Got to Do with Dick”
1999	Angel	Bartender	Episode “Lonely Hearts”
2000–2005	Stargate SG-1	Rak’nor	6 episodes
2000	Star Trek: Voyager	Protector	Episode “Blink of an Eye”
2001	Columbo: Murder with Too Many Notes	Nathaniel Murphy	Television film
2001	The District	Mason Avery	2 episodes
2001	H.M.O.		Television pilot
2002	Role of a Lifetime	Ritchie	Film, Credited as Obi N’Defo
2002	Crossing Jordan	Joe Wheeler	Episode “As If by Fate”
2002	NYPD Blue	Officer Carpenter	Episode “Off the Wall”
2003	Filet of 4		Short film
2003	Half & Half	Marcus	Episode “The Big Foot in My Mouth Episode”
2003	The West Wing	Donald	Episode “Separation of Powers”
2013	Vampires in Venice	Pepper	Film
2017	Beauty and the Baller	Sergio	2 episodes
2021	NCIS: Los Angeles	Joyner	Episode “Fukushu”
