= David Palffy =

Canadian film and television actor

- Born: March 5, 1969 (age 57); Canada
- Occupation: Actor
- Spouse: Erica Durance (m. 2005; div. 2024)
- Children: 3

David Palffy (born March 5 1969) is a Canadian film and television actor of Welsh and Hungarian descent, best known for playing Anubis and Sokar on Stargate SG-1.

== Early life ==
David Palffy attended the Royal Academy of Dramatic Art in London, England.

== Career ==
Palffy played the Goa'uld villains Sokar and Anubis in Stargate SG-1. He had recurring guest appearances in The X-Files, First Wave, Blade: The Series, and Andromeda. He played the role of Castillo Sermano in the film adaptation of the video game House of the Dead. He also played the main antagonist, Caleb Reece in the 2004 racing video game, Need for Speed: Underground 2.

== Personal life ==
Palffy married actress Erica Durance in 2005. The couple divorced in 2024. Their first child was born in February 2015 and their second son was born in December 2016. Palffy also has a son from a previous relationship.
