= The Bridge Studios =

Canadian film studio

Coordinates: 49.263611°N 123.021029°W

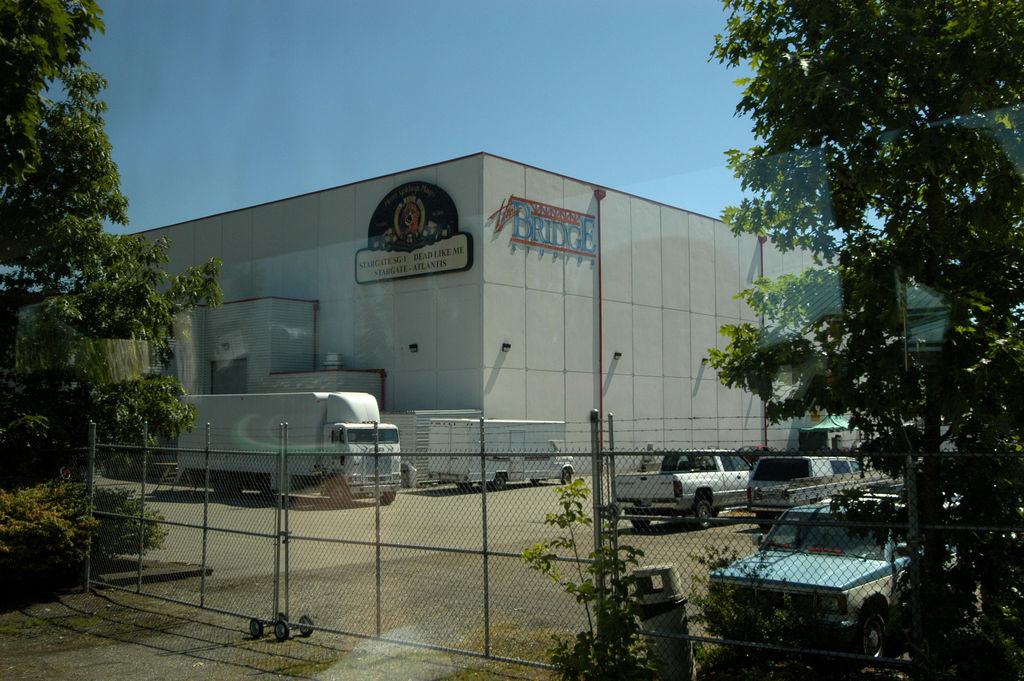
The Bridge Studios

The Bridge Studios is a Canadian film studio in Burnaby, British Columbia. It operates the largest effects stage in North America. Its eight studios, ranging in size from 4,600 square feet (430 m^{2}) to 40,000 square feet (3,700 m^{2}), are located on a 15-acre (6.1 ha) lot at 2400 Boundary Road.

The studios' name derives from the lot's use by Dominion Bridge Company, a steel bridge constructor, from 1930 until the mid-1970s.

The site was first used for filming after the departure of Dominion Bridge. The government of British Columbia financed the conversion of the lot to permanent studios in 1987.

== Projects filmed at the Studios ==
The parenthetical years are filming dates, not release dates.

- Once Upon a Time (2010–2018)
- 3000 Miles to Graceland (1999)
- 40 Days and 40 Nights (2000)
- Alive: The Miracle of the Andes (1991)
- Another Stakeout (1992)
- Bad Company (1993)
- Battlestar Galactica (2003)
- Big Bully (1996)
- Bird on a Wire (1989)
- Black Christmas (2006)
- Blade: Trinity (2004)
- Boy Meets Girl (1993)
- The Boy Who Could Fly (1985)
- Breaking News (2000-2001)
- Carpool (1996)
- Carrie (2002)
- Christmas Comes to Willow Creek (1988)
- The Clan of the Cave Bear (1984)
- Cousins (1989)
- Creature (1996)
- The Crush (1992)
- Dead Like Me (2003)
- The Death of the Incredible Hulk (1989)
- Deep Rising (1997)
- Defying Gravity (2009)
- Devour (2004)
- Disappearance of Vonnie (1993)
- Double Happiness (1992)
- Dudley Do-Right (1999)
- Dungeon Siege (2005)
- Ecks vs. Sever (2002)
- The Escape (1998)
- The Experts (1988)
- The Fall of the House of Usher (2023)
- First Blood (1982)
- The Five People You Meet in Heaven (2004)
- The Fly II (1988)
- Glory Days (2002)
- Hidden Target (2001)
- Highlander: The Series (1992)
- Highstakes (1985)
- Hollow Man 2 (2005)
- Iceman (1984)
- The Imaginarium of Doctor Parnassus (2007)
- It (1990)
- J.J. Starbuck (1988)
- Jeremiah (2001-2003)
- John Tucker Must Die (2006)
- Jumanji (1995)
- Kevin of the North (2000)
- Killer Instinct (2005)
- Kyle/Just a Phase (2005)
- Leaving Normal (1991)
- Legends of the Fall (1993)
- Look Who's Talking Now (1992)
- MacGyver (1987-1991)
- Man of the House (1994)
- Martian Child (2007)
- Miracle (2004)
- Miracle on I-880 (1992)
- Miracle on Ice (2003)
- Mission to Mars (2000)
- Mother Lode (1981)
- Mustard Pancakes (2004)
- My Brother's Keeper (2001)
- Narrow Margin (1990)
- The New Adventures of Beans Baxter (1988)
- Outer Limits (1993-2001)
- Passing Through Veils (1991)
- PC and the Web (1999)
- The Pledge (1999)
- Poltergeist (1994-1998)
- Reign of Fire (2001)
- Roxanne (1986)
- Runaway (1984)
- Saints (1988)
- Scary Movie 3 (2003)
- Science Max (2015-)
- Shoot to Kill (1988)
- Snow Dogs (2001)
- Snow Falling on Cedars (1996)
- Spacehunter: Adventures in the Forbidden Zone (1983)
- Sphere (1996)
- Stakeout (1987)
- Stargate Atlantis (2004-2009)
- Stargate SG-1 (1997-2007)
- Stargate Universe (2009-2011)
- Stay Tuned (1992)
- Sudbury (2004)
- They (2001)
- Thir13en Ghosts (2001)
- Timecop (1994)
- Tomb of Charles D Ward (1991)
- Tooth Fairy (2005)
- Trapped (2001)
- The Trial of the Incredible Hulk (1989)
- Two for the Money (2004)
- Valentine (2000)
- Walls (1984)
- White Fang (1991)
- Wolf Lake (2000)
- A Wrinkle in Time (2001)
- Wrong Turn 2: Dead End (2007)
