= List of The Killing episodes =

The Killing is an American serial crime drama television series developed by Veena Sud, based on the Danish series of the same name that premiered on AMC on April 3, 2011. The first two seasons center on the homicide of a young girl, Rosie Larsen, and its ensuing consequences on the police force, the suspects, and her distraught family. The third and fourth seasons focus on separate murder investigations. It stars Mireille Enos and Joel Kinnaman as two homicide detectives, as they investigate crimes in Seattle, Washington.

On July 27, 2012, AMC canceled the series after two seasons. However, on January 15, 2013, AMC and Fox Television Studios announced that the series had been renewed for a third season. On September 10, 2013, AMC canceled the series again after three seasons. However, on November 15, 2013, Netflix ordered a fourth and final season of six episodes, which was released on August 1, 2014. During the course of the series, 44 episodes of The Killing aired.

== Series overview ==
Season	Episodes	Originally released		
Season	Episodes	First released	Last released	Network
1	13	April 3, 2011	June 19, 2011	AMC
2	13	April 1, 2012	June 17, 2012	AMC
3	12	June 2, 2013	August 4, 2013	AMC
4	6	August 1, 2014		Netflix

== Episodes ==
=== Season 1 (2011) ===
No. overall	No. in season	Title	Directed by	Written by	Original release date	Prod. code	US viewers (millions)
1	1	"Pilot"	Patty Jenkins	Teleplay by : Veena Sud	April 3, 2011	BDH179/S179	2.72
2	2	"The Cage"	Ed Bianchi	Veena Sud	April 3, 2011	BDH101/S101	2.72
3	3	"El Diablo"	Gwyneth Horder-Payton	Dawn Prestwich & Nicole Yorkin	April 10, 2011	BDH102/S102	2.56
4	4	"A Soundless Echo"	Jennifer Getzinger	Soo Hugh	April 17, 2011	BDH103/S103	2.51
5	5	"Super 8"	Phil Abraham	Jeremy Doner	April 24, 2011	BDH104/S104	2.25
6	6	"What You Have Left"	Agnieszka Holland	Nic Pizzolatto	May 1, 2011	BDH105/S105	1.81
7	7	"Vengeance"	Ed Bianchi	Linda Burstyn	May 8, 2011	BDH106/S106	1.83
8	8	"Stonewalled"	Dan Attias	Aaron Zelman	May 15, 2011	BDH107/S107	1.98
9	9	"Undertow"	Agnieszka Holland	Dan Nowak	May 22, 2011	BDH108/S108	1.69
10	10	"I'll Let You Know When I Get There"	Ed Bianchi	Nicole Yorkin & Dawn Prestwich	May 29, 2011	BDH109/S109	1.97
11	11	"Missing"	Nicole Kassell	Veena Sud	June 5, 2011	BDH110/S110	1.98
12	12	"Beau Soleil"	Keith Gordon	Jeremy Doner & Soo Hugh	June 12, 2011	BDH111/S111	1.83
13	13	"Orpheus Descending"	Brad Anderson	Veena Sud & Nic Pizzolatto	June 19, 2011	BDH112/S112	2.32

=== Season 2 (2012) ===
No. overall	No. in season	Title	Directed by	Written by	Original release date	Prod. code	US viewers (millions)
14	1	"Reflections"	Agnieszka Holland	Veena Sud	April 1, 2012	BDH201/S201	1.80
15	2	"My Lucky Day"	Dan Attias	Dawn Prestwich & Nicole Yorkin	April 1, 2012	BDH202/S202	1.80
16	3	"Numb"	Brad Anderson	Eliza Clark	April 8, 2012	BDH203/S203	1.81
17	4	"Ogi Jun"	Phil Abraham	Jeremy Doner	April 15, 2012	BDH204/S204	1.65
18	5	"Ghosts of the Past"	Ed Bianchi	Wendy Riss	April 22, 2012	BDH205/S205	1.59
19	6	"Openings"	Kevin Bray	Aaron Zelman	April 29, 2012	BDH206/S206	1.35
20	7	"Keylela"	Nicole Kassell	Dan Nowak	May 6, 2012	BDH207/S207	1.34
21	8	"Off the Reservation"	Veena Sud	Nathaniel Halpern	May 13, 2012	BDH208/S208	1.61
22	9	"Sayonara, Hiawatha"	Phil Abraham	Nicole Yorkin & Dawn Prestwich	May 20, 2012	BDH209/S209	1.31
23	10	"72 Hours"	Nicole Kassell	Eliza Clark	May 27, 2012	BDH210/S210	1.31
24	11	"Bulldog"	Ed Bianchi	Jeremy Doner	June 3, 2012	BDH211/S211	1.67
25	12	"Donnie or Marie"	Keith Gordon	Aaron Zelman & Wendy Riss	June 10, 2012	BDH212/S212	1.84
26	13	"What I Know"	Patty Jenkins	Veena Sud & Dan Nowak	June 17, 2012	BDH213/S213	1.45

=== Season 3 (2013) ===
No. overall	No. in season	Title	Directed by	Written by	Original release date	Prod. code	US viewers (millions)
27	1	"The Jungle"	Ed Bianchi	Veena Sud	June 2, 2013	BDH301/S301	1.76
28	2	"That You Fear the Most"	Lodge Kerrigan	Dan Nowak	June 2, 2013	BDH302/S302	1.76
29	3	"Seventeen"	Kari Skogland	Eliza Clark	June 9, 2013	BDH303/S303	1.47
30	4	"Head Shots"	Michael Rymer	Dawn Prestwich & Nicole Yorkin	June 16, 2013	BDH304/S304	1.36
31	5	"Scared and Running"	Dan Attias	Coleman Herbert	June 23, 2013	BDH305/S305	1.67
32	6	"Eminent Domain"	Keith Gordon	David Wiener	June 30, 2013	BDH306/S306	1.37
33	7	"Hope Kills"	Tricia Brock	Brett Conrad	July 7, 2013	BDH307/S307	1.62
34	8	"Try"	Lodge Kerrigan	Nic Sheff & Aaron Slavik	July 14, 2013	BDH308/S308	1.52
35	9	"Reckoning"	Jonathan Demme	Dan Nowak	July 21, 2013	BDH309/S309	1.35
36	10	"Six Minutes"	Nicole Kassell	Veena Sud	July 28, 2013	BDH310/S310	1.47
37	11	"From Up Here"	Phil Abraham	Eliza Clark	August 4, 2013	BDH311/S311	1.48
38	12	"The Road to Hamelin"	Dan Attias	Dawn Prestwich & Nicole Yorkin	August 4, 2013	BDH312/S312	1.48

=== Season 4 (2014) ===
No. overall	No. in season	Title	Directed by	Written by	Original release date	Prod. code
39	1	"Blood in the Water"	Nicole Kassell	Veena Sud	August 1, 2014	BDH401
40	2	"Unraveling"	Lodge Kerrigan	Dan Nowak	August 1, 2014	BDH402
41	3	"The Good Soldier"	Ed Bianchi	Nicole Yorkin & Dawn Prestwich	August 1, 2014	BDH403
42	4	"Dream Baby Dream"	Gregory Middleton	Sean Whitesell	August 1, 2014	BDH404
43	5	"Truth Asunder"	Coky Giedroyc	Dan Nowak	August 1, 2014	BDH405
44	6	"Eden"	Jonathan Demme	Veena Sud	August 1, 2014	BDH406

== Ratings ==
The Killing : U.S. viewers per episode (millions)

Season	Episode number													Average
Season	1	2	3	4	5	6	7	8	9	10	11	12	13	Average
1	2.72	2.72	2.56	2.51	2.25	1.81	1.83	1.98	1.69	1.97	1.98	1.83	2.32	2.17
2	1.80	1.80	1.81	1.65	1.59	1.35	1.34	1.61	1.31	1.31	1.67	1.84	1.45	1.58
3	1.76	1.76	1.47	1.36	1.67	1.37	1.62	1.52	1.35	1.47	1.48	1.48	–	1.52

Audience measurement performed by Nielsen Media Research
