= The Killing season 1 =

The Killing
- Season 1
- Season 1 promotional poster
- No. of episodes: 13

Release
- Original network: AMC
- Original release: April 3 – June 19, 2011

Season chronology
- Next → Season 2

The first season of the AMC American crime drama television series The Killing premiered on April 3, 2011 and concluded on June 19, 2011. The series was developed and produced by Veena Sud and based on the Danish series, Forbrydelsen (The Crime). Set in Seattle, Washington, this season follows the investigation into the murder of local teenager Rosie Larsen, with each episode covering approximately 24 hours. The first season covers the first two weeks of the investigation and has three main storylines: the police investigation into Rosie's murder, the attempts of her family to deal with their grief, and the fluctuating electoral fortunes of a political campaign that becomes embroiled in the case. It stars Mireille Enos as homicide detective Sarah Linden and Joel Kinnaman as rookie detective Stephen Holder.

== Cast ==
=== Main ===
- Mireille Enos as Sarah Linden, the lead homicide detective
- Billy Campbell as Darren Richmond, politician running for mayor of Seattle
- Joel Kinnaman as Stephen Holder, Sarah's homicide detective partner
- Michelle Forbes as Mitch Larsen, Rosie's mother
- Brent Sexton as Stanley Larsen, Rosie's father
- Kristin Lehman as Gwen Eaton, Darren's lover and his campaign adviser
- Eric Ladin as Jamie Wright, Darren's campaign manager
- Brendan Sexton III as Belko Royce, Stan's co-worker and close friend
- Jamie Anne Allman as Terry Marek, Mitch's younger sister and Rosie's aunt
- Annie Corley as Regi Darnell, Sarah's social worker and mother figure

=== Recurring ===
- Brandon Jay McLaren as Bennet Ahmed, a teacher at Rosie's high school
- Tom Butler as Lesley Adams, the mayor of Seattle
- Garry Chalk as Lt. Michael Oakes, the detectives' boss
- Liam James as Jack Linden, Sarah's son
- Evan Bird as Tom Larsen, Rosie's brother
- Seth Isaac Johnson as Denny Larsen, Rosie's brother
- Katie Findlay as Rosie Larsen
- Kerry Sandomirsky as Principal Meyers, principal at Rosie's high school
- Ashley Johnson as Amber Ahmed, Bennet Ahmed's wife
- Callum Keith Rennie as Rick Felder, Sarah's fiancé
- Lee Garlington as Ruth Yitanes, local senator endorsing Darren's campaign
- Patrick Gilmore as Tom Drexler, a wealthy entrepreneur who contributed to Darren's campaign
- Richard Harmon as Jasper Ames, Rosie's ex-boyfriend
- Colin Lawrence as Benjamin Abani, Adams' campaign manager
- Kacey Rohl as Sterling Fitch, Rosie's best friend
- Brian Markinson as Gil Sloane, Holder's NA sponsor
- Gharrett Patrick Paon as Kris Echols, Jasper's tweaker friend
- Alan Dale as Senator Eaton, Gwen's father
- Claudia Ferri as Nicole Jackson, the manager of the Wapi Eagle Casino
- Barclay Hope as Michael Ames, Jasper's father
- Don Thompson as Janek Kovarsky, Stan's former mob boss
- Patti Kim as Roberta Drays, the security chief at the Wapi Eagle Casino

== Plot ==
Set in Seattle, Washington, the series follows the investigation into the murder of local teenager Rosie Larsen, with each episode covering approximately 24 hours. The first season covers the first two weeks of the investigation and has three main storylines: the police investigation of Rosie's murder, the attempts of her family to deal with their grief, and the fluctuating electoral fortunes of a political campaign that becomes embroiled in the case.

The main character is Sarah Linden (Mireille Enos), an experienced homicide detective who is about to retire at a young age to follow her fiancé (Callum Keith Rennie) to Sonoma, California. On her last day on the job, Linden is partnered with rookie homicide detective Stephen Holder (Joel Kinnaman), who has recently transferred from an undercover assignment in vice and narcotics. Holder's erratic and aggressive style contrasts with Linden's more reserved demeanor. The two are sent to investigate a possible crime scene in a local wilderness park, where a bloody woman's shirt and a credit card belonging to Stan Larsen (Brent Sexton) have been discovered. The detectives talk to Larsen's wife Mitch (Michelle Forbes), who reveals that the family has just returned from a weekend camping trip and their seventeen-year-old daughter Rosie had not gone with them. It soon turns out that no one seems to know where Rosie was, and her father Stan and the police frantically search for her. Eventually, a car belonging to the mayoral campaign of city councilman Darren Richmond (Billy Campbell) is pulled from a lake in the park, and Rosie is discovered dead in the trunk.

As the Larsen family tries to cope with its grief, police suspicion initially focuses on Rosie's rich, dissolute boyfriend Jasper and his drug dealing friend Kris, who had been at a party with Rosie the night she went missing. This suspicion only increases when a video surfaces of Jasper and Kris having sex with someone wearing Rosie's Halloween costume, and blood is discovered in the room where the video was shot. However, one of Rosie's friends comes forward to admit that it was her on the tape.

The police next begin to suspect Rosie's English teacher Bennet Ahmed (Brandon Jay McLaren), after the police discover that he had written her letters and is now married to a woman who used to be one of his students. Police suspicion grows after it is discovered that Rosie had visited Bennet's house the night she disappeared, and that Bennet had lied about the visit. The police's interest in Bennet is leaked to the press, resulting in attacks on Bennet's mosque. The revelation also damages the Richmond campaign, as Bennet had worked as a volunteer at a community program sponsored by Richmond, and the candidate refuses to denounce him without proof of his guilt. After the police fail to obtain enough evidence to arrest Bennet, Mitch Larsen goads her husband, who had previously worked as an enforcer for a local criminal syndicate, into savagely beating Bennet, leaving the man in a coma. However, the police soon discover Bennet is innocent, when a friend who was at Bennet's house provides him with an alibi. On discovering Bennet's innocence, Stan Larsen turns himself in to the authorities.

Now without a prime suspect, the police discover Rosie had been making trips to a Native American casino located on an unnamed island in Puget Sound, where she had been making regular deposits into a secret bank account she had opened under the name of her aunt Terry (Jamie Anne Allman). Terry, it is discovered, had been working as a prostitute for a high-end escort service, which the police suspect Rosie may have been involved in as well. From Terry, the police learn of an intimidating client who had threatened to drown another prostitute. They soon discover this client is Darren Richmond. Richmond had earlier been eliminated as a suspect because his campaign manager (Kristin Lehman), with whom he was romantically involved, had provided him with an alibi. However, after discovering Richmond has been engaging in other romantic relationships, she tells the police Richmond was gone for several hours the night Rosie was murdered. Later, Holder provides them with a photograph from a toll booth camera showing Richmond leaving the casino in the car in which Rosie was found. The police arrest Richmond, potentially destroying his campaign, while Linden boards a plane to Sonoma with her son. Richmond is shown in a perp walk outside the police station. Belko Royce (Brendan Sexton III), a family friend of the Larsens, and a suspect in the case, approaches Richmond and draws a gun.

The season one finale ends with a plot twist. As her plane readies for takeoff, Linden receives a phone call from the state police informing her the toll booth cameras, from which Holder had supposedly gotten the incriminating photograph of Richmond, have been broken for months and no footage is available; she therefore realizes the photograph was falsified evidence and the case against Richmond is compromised. Meanwhile, Holder meets with an unidentified person with whom he discusses his falsification of this evidence.

== Crew ==
Series developer Veena Sud also served as executive producer and showrunner of the first season, she wrote three episodes, including the pilot episode, and she co-wrote the season finale. The remaining writing staff consisted of co-executive producers Dawn Prestwich and Nicole Yorkin, who co-wrote two episodes together; consulting producer Aaron Zelman, who wrote a single episode; and co-producer Jeremy Doner, who wrote two episodes. The other episodes were written by freelance writers: Soo Hugh and Nic Pizzolatto each wrote two episodes, while Linda Burstyn and Dan Nowak each wrote one. Kristen Campo served as producer, while Mikkel Bondesen, along with producers from the original Danish series, Søren Sveistrup, Piv Bernth, and Ingolf Gabold, were executive producers.

Patty Jenkins directed the pilot, Ed Bianchi directed three episodes in season one, Agnieszka Holland directed two episodes, and Gwyneth Horder-Payton, Jennifer Getzinger, Phil Abraham, Dan Attias, Nicole Kassell, Keith Gordon, and Brad Anderson each directed one of the remaining episodes.

== Episodes ==
No. overall	No. in season	Title	Directed by	Written by	Original release date	Prod. code	US viewers (millions)
1	1	"Pilot"	Patty Jenkins	Teleplay by : Veena Sud	April 3, 2011	BDH179/S179	2.72
In Seattle, Detective Sarah Linden investigates the disappearance of 17-year-old Rosie Larsen. When Larsen's body is discovered, Linden begins a murder investigation while putting her private life on hold. The body is found in a vehicle belonging to the mayoral campaign of city councilman Darren Richmond, worsening his chances in an upcoming election.
2	2	"The Cage"	Ed Bianchi	Veena Sud	April 3, 2011	BDH101/S101	2.72
Police question Rosie Larsen's grieving parents and Rosie's best friends enter the suspect list, which leads the detectives to new evidence found at the school.
3	3	"El Diablo"	Gwyneth Horder-Payton	Dawn Prestwich & Nicole Yorkin	April 10, 2011	BDH102/S102	2.56
Councilman Richmond suspects a leak within his team, and Sarah tracks down a witness leading to a suspect, while trying to work with her new awkward partner Holder.
4	4	"A Soundless Echo"	Jennifer Getzinger	Soo Hugh	April 17, 2011	BDH103/S103	2.51
The Larsens plan their daughter's funeral, while Linden and Holder are drawn to Rosie's literature teacher, Bennet Ahmed, who has a questionable past and pregnant young wife.
5	5	"Super 8"	Phil Abraham	Jeremy Doner	April 24, 2011	BDH104/S104	2.25
Darren Richmond and his team plan an anti-crime commercial; Stan turns to work colleague Belko Royce for help in finding Rosie's killer; and the detectives question Bennet Ahmed and his wife.
6	6	"What You Have Left"	Agnieszka Holland	Nic Pizzolatto	May 1, 2011	BDH105/S105	1.81
The police further investigate Bennet Ahmed, which leads the Larsens to believe that he is a prime suspect, and the mayoral candidates hold their televised debate, allowing the current mayor to bring up Richmond's attachment to a murder suspect.
7	7	"Vengeance"	Ed Bianchi	Linda Burstyn	May 8, 2011	BDH106/S106	1.83
More evidence is uncovered about Bennet Ahmed, and Richmond's decision to remain loyal to Bennet backfires.
8	8	"Stonewalled"	Dan Attias	Aaron Zelman	May 15, 2011	BDH107/S107	1.98
The detectives' investigation crosses paths with a federal one; leaks of crime-scene photos to the press baffle both the police and the Larsens; and partial histories of both Holder and Richmond are revealed.
9	9	"Undertow"	Agnieszka Holland	Dan Nowak	May 22, 2011	BDH108/S108	1.69
After their warrant for Bennet Ahmed gets quashed, the detectives question an acquaintance of his; mayoral candidate Darren Richmond puts an end to any personal attacks on his opponent; and the Larsens take justice into their own hands.
10	10	"I'll Let You Know When I Get There"	Ed Bianchi	Nicole Yorkin & Dawn Prestwich	May 29, 2011	BDH109/S109	1.97
Forced to restart their investigation into Rosie Larsen's murder, the detectives are pointed to a new suspect; Mitch Larsen receives a strange phone call about the family business; and the Richmond campaign staff is given an interesting piece of information about their boss.
11	11	"Missing"	Nicole Kassell	Veena Sud	June 5, 2011	BDH110/S110	1.98
The investigation gets stalled, as the detectives must again wait on a warrant, and their time is spent trying to find Jack, Sarah Linden's missing son.
12	12	"Beau Soleil"	Keith Gordon	Jeremy Doner & Soo Hugh	June 12, 2011	BDH111/S111	1.83
The detectives investigate the link between Rosie Larsen and casino camera footage; Mitch Larsen learns that her jailed husband, Stan, has drained their bank account; and the Richmond campaign gets new life as the mayor's takes a hit.
13	13	"Orpheus Descending"	Brad Anderson	Veena Sud & Nic Pizzolatto	June 19, 2011	BDH112/S112	2.32
The detectives investigate Darren Richmond's involvement with Rosie Larsen; Mitch and Stan Larsen discuss their family's future; and Belko Royce takes action to protect the Larsens and get revenge.

== Production ==
The pilot was ordered by AMC in January 2010, and then was picked up for a full series order in August 2010. The series is filmed in Vancouver, British Columbia, and production began on the pilot episode on December 2, 2010. The pilot is written by series creator and executive producer Veena Sud and is directed by Patty Jenkins.

In contrast to the original Danish series, executive producer Veena Sud explained, "We're creating our own world. We are using the Danish series as a blueprint, but we are kind of diverging and creating our own world, our world of suspects and, potentially, ultimately who killed Rosie Larsen." Sud describes the series as "slow-burn storytelling in a sense that every moment that we don't have to prettify or gloss over or make something necessarily easy to digest, that we're able to go to all sorts of places that are honest, and dark, and beautiful and tragic, in a way that is how a story should be told."

== Reception ==
=== Critical reception ===
The series premiere received universal acclaim from critics, and received a Metacritic score of 84 out of 100 based on 29 reviews. Tim Goodman of The Hollywood Reporter gave the series a very positive review, calling it "excellent, absorbing and addictive. When each episode ends, you long for the next — a hallmark of great dramas." Goodman also praised Mireille Enos' performance as the lead character Sarah, saying "It's not until you watch Enos play Sarah for a while that it sinks in — there hasn't been a female American character like her probably ever." Entertainment Weekly's Ken Tucker gave it a B+, saying "The acting is strikingly good" and that "Some viewers may find The Killing a little too cold and deliberate, but give it time. Its intensity builds steadily, giving the series unexpected power." Alex Strachan of The Vancouver Sun says the series "is soaked in atmosphere and steeped in the stark realism of Scandinavian crime novelists Henning Mankell and Stieg Larsson" and that it "is not as much about a young girl's murder as it is a psychological study of what happens afterward, how a tight-knit community tries to recover and how a dead child's mother, father and siblings learn to deal with their pain in their own private ways." Matt Roush of TV Guide applauded the series, calling the acting "tremendous" and that he "was instantly hooked by the moody atmosphere of this season-long murder mystery set in Seattle." He went on to say "What really stands out for me, in this age of cookie-cutter procedurals, is how The Killing dramatizes the devastation a violent death has on a family, a community, on the people involved in the investigation. Nothing about this show is routine."

Subsequent episodes were met with lesser praise by some critics who noted the show's reliance upon increasingly implausible red herrings to drive each episode. Further, withholding details about character’s history made it difficult to relate to the characters or empathize with them. The first-season finale was met with negative reviews from a number of critics. The Los Angeles Times called it "one of the most frustrating finales in TV history", with Alan Sepinwall of HitFix calling the end "insulting". Finally, Maureen Ryan of AOL TV said the season "killed off any interest I had in ever watching the show again." "[The show] began last spring looking like the smartest, most stylish pilot in years," complained Heather Havrilevsky in The New York Times Magazine. "Fast-forward to the finale, in which we learn that what we've been watching is actually a 26-hour-long episode of Law & Order, and we're only halfway through it."

=== Ratings ===
When it premiered, the pilot was AMC's second-highest original series premiere following The Walking Dead. The premiere drew 2.7 million viewers and a 2 household rating. The two encores of the premiere episode brought the ratings of the premiere up to a total of 4.6 million total viewers and a 3.7 household rating. The UK premiere on Channel 4 brought in 2.2 million viewers.

=== Awards and nominations ===
Year	Association	Category	Nominated work	Result
2011	1st Critics' Choice Television Awards	Best Drama Series	The Killing	Nominated
2011	1st Critics' Choice Television Awards	Best Actress in a Drama Series	Mireille Enos	Nominated
2011	1st Critics' Choice Television Awards	Best Supporting Actress in a Drama Series	Michelle Forbes	Nominated
2011	63rd Primetime Emmy Awards	Outstanding Lead Actress in a Drama Series	Mireille Enos	Nominated
2011	63rd Primetime Emmy Awards	Outstanding Supporting Actress in a Drama Series	Michelle Forbes	Nominated
2011	63rd Primetime Emmy Awards	Outstanding Directing for a Drama Series	Patty Jenkins (Episode: "Pilot")	Nominated
2011	63rd Primetime Emmy Awards	Outstanding Writing for a Drama Series	Veena Sud (Episode: "Pilot")	Nominated
2011	63rd Primetime Emmy Awards	Outstanding Single-Camera Picture Editing for a Drama Series	Elizabeth Kling (Episode: "Pilot")	Nominated
2011	63rd Primetime Emmy Awards	Outstanding Casting for a Drama Series	The Killing	Nominated
2012	38th Saturn Awards	Best Television Presentation	The Killing	Nominated
2012	38th Saturn Awards	Best Actress in Television	Mireille Enos	Nominated
2012	38th Saturn Awards	Best Supporting Actor in Television	Joel Kinnaman	Nominated
2012	38th Saturn Awards	Best Supporting Actress in Television	Michelle Forbes	Won
2012	64th Writers Guild of America Awards	Best New Series	The Killing	Nominated
2012	69th Golden Globe Awards	Best Actress – TV Series Drama	Mireille Enos	Nominated
2012	Directors Guild of America Award	Outstanding Directorial Achievement in Dramatic Series	Patty Jenkins	Won

== Home media releases ==
The first season of The Killing was released on DVD and Blu-ray Disc on March 13, 2012 in region 1. The set includes all 13 episodes, an extended version of the season finale, two audio commentaries, a featurette called "An Autopsy of The Killing", deleted scenes and bloopers.
