= Super 8 (The Killing) =

- The Killing episode
- Episode no.: Season 1 Episode 5
- Directed by: Phil Abraham
- Written by: Jeremy Doner
- Production code: BDH104/S104
- Original air date: April 24, 2011

Guest appearances
- Seth Isaac Johnson as Denny Larsen; Evan Bird as Tom Larsen; Brandon Jay McLaren as Bennet Ahmed; Ashley Johnson as Amber Ahmed; Lee Garlington as Ruth Yitanes; Tom Butler as Mayor Lesley Adams; Colin Lawrence as Benjamin Abani; David Bloom as Lab Technician

Episode chronology
← Previous "A Soundless Echo"	Next → "What You Have Left"
- The Killing (season 1)

"Super 8" is the fifth episode of the American television drama series The Killing, which aired on April 24, 2011 on AMC in the United States. The episode was written by Jeremy Doner and was directed by Phil Abraham. In the episode, Darren Richmond (Billy Campbell) and his team plan an anti-crime commercial; Stan Larsen (Brent Sexton) turns to Belko Royce (Brendan Sexton III) for help in finding Rosie's killer; and Sarah (Mireille Enos) and Holder (Joel Kinnaman) question Bennet Ahmed (Brandon Jay McLaren) and his wife.

== Plot ==
Denny Larsen (Seth Isaac Johnson) wants cereal for breakfast, only to find the milk carton is empty. After taking money from his father's wallet, he walks, in his pajamas, to the store to buy some. While his brother is gone shopping, Tom (Evan Bird) wakes up to find he has wet his bed. He tosses his soiled pajamas and sheets downstairs into the moving company's trash can. Back upstairs, he sees Denny eating Rosie's cereal and threatens to tell their parents. Denny replies that their parents don’t care what the boys do. Later, Terry (Jamie Anne Allman) hears the boys mention that there is no food in the house and offers to go to the store. Mitch (Michelle Forbes) says that she will buy the groceries. Downstairs, Belko tells Stan that their moving jobs are being canceled because of Rosie’s death and offers to find out whom at the high school is being investigated. Stan originally declines the offer, but, later, grief causes him to accept.

At the high school, Sarah and Holder ask Bennet if he ever drove one of Richmond’s campaign cars. He tells them that he has not. He adds that he returned home after the Halloween dance. His wife cannot confirm this, because the floors in their house were being refinished, so she stayed with her sister to avoid the fumes. As for the flooring company, they canceled at the last minute and also cannot confirm his alibi. Sarah asks about his letters to Rosie. Bennet replies that they were an “intellectual discourse.” To prove Rosie’s intelligence, he gives the detectives a Super 8 mm film project that she had done. At the police station, Sarah and Holder view Rosie's film, which shows images of butterflies and Rosie riding a bicycle. Sarah says that someone else helped make the film and wonders if one shot might contain a reflected face. Outside the station, Sarah spies Holder receiving an envelope from a man in a car. In his office, she sees Holder counting what he says are blackjack winnings. He tells her that the flooring company says that Bennet canceled the job, which contradicts Bennet’s previous statement.

At his apartment, Gwen (Kristin Lehman) tells Darren that the Larsen death harms the campaign and asks him to request that the parents appear in a commercial. Later, at a boathouse, he meets Jamie (Eric Ladin), who informs him of an upcoming meeting with Mayor Adams and again argues that Gwen is the campaign's leak. Richmond does not think so. Later, at the supermarket, he approaches Mitch and tells her of his own grief following his wife's death. He tries to comfort her then leaves. In his car, he tells Gwen that Mitch was not in the store. Jamie meets with Mayor Adams (Tom Butler) and his campaign director, Benjamin Abani (Colin Lawrence), at a private club. He admits to frustration with Richmond. Adams then mentions discovering that Councilwoman Yitanes had tried to plant someone in his own campaign. Later, Jamie and Richmond again secretly meet, where Jamie tells him that Yitanes is the leak and reminds him that Gwen previously worked for the councilwoman.

At the high school, Holder wonders if a tryst gone wrong led Bennet to kill Rosie. Sarah muses that perhaps Bennet canceled the flooring appointment so he could clean the apartment before his wife returned. The detectives interview Principal Meyers, who reveals that Bennet married a former student. Sarah and Holder visit Bennet's pregnant wife, Amber (Ashley Johnson). She also talks of letters Bennet wrote to her while she was in high school, encouraging her to pursue her dreams. Amber says that, on Friday night, she drove the couple's car to her sister's house at Bennet's request. Sarah asks to use the bathroom, but, instead, examines a room containing plastic sheeting and chemicals, including ammonium hydroxide. Holder continues chatting with Amber. She tells him that Bennet called her at ten o'clock on Friday night from his cell phone, not the apartment's phone. Back at the station, Holder wants to arrest Bennet, but Sarah says they must first place Rosie in his apartment. Sarah then requests that Rosie's body be tested for ammonium hydroxide.

Richmond receives an envelope at his office followed by a phone call from Jamie. Minutes later, security guards remove communications aide Nathan Patrick (Peter Benson). That evening, Richmond and Gwen accuse Councilwoman Yitanes of planting Nathan to leak campaign information, in order to manipulate Richmond. He threatens to have her arrested for the felony if she withdraws her endorsement. As she leaves, she mentions to Gwen that he also investigated her e-mails.

A lab technician (David Bloom) tells Sarah that Rosie tested clean for drugs and alcohol but positive for ammonium hydroxide, which could explain the lack of evidence under her nails and the inconclusive tests for sexual assault. Sarah remarks that the killer sounds like a professional and later analyzes still pictures captured from Rosie‘s film. Elsewhere, Holder stands outside a house, watching a woman and two children inside, before placing an envelope in the home's mailbox.

Meanwhile, Richmond shoots a campaign commercial highlighting his Seattle basketball program. As the cameras film, he places an arm around Bennet, a coach in the program.

== Production ==
In an interview with Mina Hochberg at AMCTV.com, Eric Ladin spoke about how he portrays his character, Jamie Wright: "Whenever you take on a character like this — somebody who is easily villainized or somebody who possibly could be disliked by your audience — it's important that you make sure you justify everything that he or she is doing. So that was kind of step one for me. He doesn't necessarily come from a place of malice or ill will. I would say he has a competitive nature. He has an undying will to win, so he knows what that takes."

== Reception ==
The episode received favorable reviews. The A.V. Club's Meredith Blake rated this episode a B−, saying "Something that’s been quietly nagging at me since The Killing began is that I don’t feel tremendously invested in any of the characters. Everyone is interesting in that they all have dark secrets, but, with the possible exception of Holder, no one is particularly intriguing." Teresa L. of TV Fanatic rated the episode 3.5 out of 5 stars and stated "This week's episode of The Killing, "Super 8", gave us very little in terms of evidence and revelations, but brought some clarity to our characters and their daily struggles ... This was a promising episode, but it didn't keep my attention nearly as well as earlier ones."

"Super 8" was watched by 2.25 million viewers, continuing its seasonal decline.
