= I'll Let You Know When I Get There =

- The Killing episode
- Episode no.: Season 1 Episode 10
- Directed by: Ed Bianchi
- Written by: Dawn Prestwich; Nicole Yorkin
- Production code: BDH109/S109
- Original air date: May 29, 2011

Guest appearances
- Garry Chalk as Lieutenant Oakes; Brandon Jay McLaren as Bennet Ahmed; Liam James as Jack; Patti Allan as Bev; Diana Bang as Intern; Katie Findlay as Rosie Larsen

Episode chronology
← Previous "Undertow"	Next → "Missing"
- The Killing (season 1)

"I'll Let You Know When I Get There" is the tenth episode of the American television drama series The Killing, which aired on May 29, 2011. The episode is co-written by series producers Dawn Prestwich and Nicole Yorkin and is directed by Ed Bianchi. In the episode, the detectives are forced to restart their investigation into Rosie Larsen's murder, but are pointed to a new suspect. Mitch Larsen receives a strange phone call about the family business. The Richmond campaign staff is given an interesting piece of information about their boss.

== Plot ==
After leaving Bennet Ahmed (Brandon Jay McLaren) unconscious in the cold, driving rain, Stan Larsen (Brent Sexton) arrives home. Mitch (Michelle Forbes) notices his bloody hands and shows him Rosie's pink shirt, disproving their mistaken assumptions about Ahmed.

At the police station, Sarah Linden (Mireille Enos) and Stephen Holder (Joel Kinnaman) lie to Lieutenant Oakes (Garry Chalk) about the Somali girl disappearing, claiming she is probably with family in Canada. Linden admits her error in judgement about Ahmed. Oakes informs them that Ahmed has been admitted to the hospital. Later, with Holder, Linden regrets discussing the case with the Larsens. Holder states that Ahmed caused his own problems. Linden adds that, if Ahmed had been truthful with them, he could have simply been charged with kidnapping a minor. She then receives a phone call that Stan Larsen has turned himself in to the police.

At the marina, Regi Darnell (Annie Corley) informs Linden that she caught Linden's son, Jack (Liam James) and three friends smoking cigarettes and drinking beer. After an argument with Regi, who complains that Jack is not being adequately supervised, Linden storms out with Jack and their belongings and checks into a motel.

The next morning, Linden looks over the Larsen evidence, focusing on a keychain's bird symbol and the mosque’s Quran. Holder arrives, and they wonder where Rosie could have gone after leaving Bennet Ahmed's apartment. At the jail, Linden asks Stan Larsen if Rosie's death could be connected to his mob past. He does not believe so. She mentions hearing his voice on the 911 call reporting Ahmed's injuries. Stan later pleads guilty to charges of kidnapping and attempted murder, but the judge permits his defense attorney to enter a not-guilty plea.

Meanwhile, Holder visits Belko Royce (Brendan Sexton III) at the Larsen garage. Belko denies knowledge of Ahmed's assault. Holder then asks about the man’s previous involvement with the Kovarsky mob. Belko maintains that was in the past.

Linden receives a phone call about a cab driver who picked up Rosie at Ahmed's apartment. She interviews the driver to learn that he drove Rosie home. Linden and Holder later view video footage from Rosie’s cab, noting that she arrives home at 10:37 p.m. under no apparent duress. On the video, as Rosie exits the cab, the lights in the Larsen apartment go off, indicating that someone is inside. The detectives arrive at the Larsen residence. Upstairs, Terry (Jamie Anne Allman) reveals to Linden that she and Belko have keys to the Larsen apartment. In the garage, Belko tells Holder that, on Friday night, he was home with his mother, whom he calls "Bev," and that, in any case, Stan didn't allow him in the apartment. Outside with Linden, Holder remembers that Belko's hands were “shredded.” At Belko's apartment, Bev (Patti Allan) greets Holder and Linden. She refers to Belko as her late-in-life "miracle baby" and her “little man.” In his bedroom, Holder spots a collage of Larsen-family photos, including many of Rosie, taped to the ceiling.

After more interrogation, Belko admits to the detectives that he witnessed Stan beating Bennet Ahmed. Linden is more interested in the night Rosie was killed. He confesses to being inside the Larsen apartment when Rosie arrived, but hid because Mitch did not like him being upstairs. He states that Rosie was on the phone and saying "Adela, I'll be there," before she left again. Linden later tells Holder that she believes Belko, and that they must figure out who Adela is and why Rosie was meeting her. Linden heads to the motel where she and Jack are staying, only to find Rick (Callum Keith Rennie) waiting for her in the hallway. He asks if she will fly with him to California later that night. When she doesn’t answer him, he kisses her and departs.

Mitch Larsen receives a call on the garage phone. A bank employee informs her that a check has bounced and there are not enough funds in the family's savings account to cover it. Stunned by the news, Mitch begins to study the family’s business and financial statements.

A campaign intern (Diana Bang) reveals to the campaign staff a video clip of Darren Richmond shaking Rosie's hand. Jamie Wright (Eric Ladin) tells Gwen Eaton (Kristin Lehman) that they should not make the video's existence known, even to Richmond. Later, alone, Eaton stares at a screenshot of Richmond (Billy Campbell) and Rosie (Katie Findlay).

The next morning, Linden runs along the waterfront and hears a ferryboat's horn. A nearby signboard displays the vessel's name, Adela, and schedule, which includes an 11:45 p.m. departure. On Puget Sound, she stands on the Adela's top deck. As the ferry approaches its destination, a sign for the Wapi Eagle Casino comes into view. The casino's logo matches the key chain found with Rosie's body.

== Production ==
In an interview with Mina Hochberg at AMCTV.com, Brendan Sexton III spoke about the interrogation scenes of his character, Belko Royce: "It was a lot of fun. Joel [Kinnaman] likes to throw his weight around when he can, so I got pretty banged up during one of the takes. I just laughed about it afterward." When asked how he was "banged up," Sexton replied, "Joel roughed me up and threw me into the chair and I didn't land correctly. There was a stunt coordinator and I'm grateful he was there, but we wanted to do our own thing. We wanted to choreograph it ourselves. I have enough trust in Joel and he has enough trust in me that he won't hurt me."

== Reception ==
"I'll Let You Know When I Get There" received mixed reviews. The A.V. Club's Meredith Blake rated this episode a C+, saying, "I feel as though [the] show has already violated some tacit, unspoken agreement with its audience: it led us down a long path to a dead end, without giving us much in exchange for our time." Sean McKenna of TV Fanatic rated the episode 4 out of 5 stars, commenting, "Hopefully, the show doesn't speed up with its information too fast as the season winds down. The slow methodical pace has dictated the series so far; it would be a shame to have everything come together in a rushed and contrived way."

The episode was watched by 1.97 million viewers, higher than the previous episode.
