= A Soundless Echo =

- The Killing episode
- Episode no.: Season 1 Episode 4
- Directed by: Jennifer Getzinger
- Written by: Soo Hugh
- Production code: BDH103/S103
- Original air date: April 17, 2011

Guest appearances
- Garry Chalk as Lieutenant Oakes; Richard Harmon as Jasper Ames; Gharrett Patrick Paon as Kris Echols; Kacey Rohl as Sterling Fitch; Lee Garlington as Ruth Yitanes; Tom Butler as Mayor Lesley Adams; Patrick Gilmore as Tom Drexler; Don Thompson as Janek Kovarsky; Brandon Jay McLaren as Bennet Ahmed

Episode chronology
← Previous "El Diablo"	Next → "Super 8"
- The Killing (season 1)

"A Soundless Echo" is the fourth episode of the American television drama series The Killing, which aired on April 17, 2011 on AMC in the United States. The episode was written by Soo Hugh and was directed by Jennifer Getzinger. In the episode, the Larsens plan their daughter's funeral. Detectives Sarah Linden and Stephen Holder are drawn to Bennet Ahmed, Rosie's literature teacher, who has a questionable past and pregnant young wife.

The episode's title is a quote from West with the Night by Beryl Markham, and the quote is found in a letter to Rosie.

== Plot ==
Kris Echols (Gharrett Patrick Paon) fidgets in an interrogation room, while Detectives Sarah Linden (Mireille Enos) and Stephen Holder (Joel Kinnaman) watch. Linden enters to question him, but Echols denies killing Rosie. She shows him a video of Rosie at the Halloween dance. He remains stoic. Holder ponders to Lieutenant Oakes (Garry Chalk) that Kris, desperate for meth, will soon crack. Oakes tells Holder that Holder looks worse than the suspect and to clean himself up. Linden sets up Kris so he sees Jasper (Richard Harmon) and his lawyer (Fred Henderson) entering an interrogation room across the hall. Holder hints to Kris that Jasper's lawyer is cutting a deal. Linden plays the cell-phone footage from The Cage for Jasper, who claims it's not what it appears to be. Across the hall, Kris explains that he would never hurt Rosie because she was nice to him. When shown the same cell-phone footage, Kris scoffs that the police don't know anything.

Darren Richmond (Billy Campbell) is told that Mayor Adams has opened an eight-point lead. Gwen Eaton (Kristin Lehman) suggests that he asks Tom Drexler, a wealthy entrepreneur who loathes Adams, to finance a media package. Richmond declines. Mayor Adams (Tom Butler) meets Jamie Wright (Eric Ladin) at a bar and invites him to join his “winning team.” When longtime donors spurn Richmond, Gwen Eaton secretly calls her father, Senator Eaton (Alan Dale), asking him to arrange a meeting between Richmond and Drexler. He admires her creativity, but criticizes her for having sex with Richmond.

At the high school, Sterling (Kacey Rohl) confesses that she's the girl in the cell-phone video. She explains that she was tired of never being noticed when Rosie was around and went to the Cage with Jasper, because she was drunk and he was nice to her, adding that she was wearing Rosie's costume because Rosie had left the dance. She also claims the blood found there was from one of her nosebleeds. Noting that Rosie sometimes boarded a bus after school, Sterling thinks that Rosie was secretly meeting someone. Holder says that he will follow up with the Larsens, but Linden says she will handle it, eliciting grumbles from Holder. Later, at the police station, she questions the Larsens about Rosie's possible affair. Mitch (Michelle Forbes) doesn't believe that has occurred. The Larsens then visit a priest (David Abbott) at a church to make arrangements for Rosie's funeral. Mitch fixates on the tortured Christ on the crucifix at the church. Mitch asks the priest where God was when her daughter needed Him.

Gwen Eaton and Darren Richmond arrive at Drexler's penthouse for a party also attended by Adams. In private, Drexler (Patrick Gilmore) gives Richmond a $50,000 check, claiming that he wants the mayor to know that he helped him lose the election. Richmond then secretly meets with Jamie Wright, who provides Richmond with an update on Adams and asks him how he knew Wright wasn't the leak. Richmond jokes that Jamie would have found a smarter way to ruin him.

Stan Larsen (Brent Sexton) drives his employee and friend, Belko Royce (Brendan Sexton III), to a suburban home. It was to be a surprise purchase for Mitch, but now he cannot afford it. Belko offers to take care of Richmond, referring to a contract killing. Stan replies that he doesn't do that anymore. He later enters a Polish restaurant to see Janek Kovarsky (Don Thompson), who scolds Stan about ignoring him for the past 17 years. After Stan explains his financial situation, Janek offers several thousand dollars, saying that family always comes first. Stan responds that they were never family, before taking the money. He later stashes the money in a drawer at his moving-company office. At their home above the business, Stan looks for a funeral dress in Rosie's closet. When Linden arrives to search the bedroom, she apologizes for their seeing crime-scene photographs earlier. Stan chastises her for not being honest with them.

At school, a boy mocks Sterling by approaching her at her locker and groping her, while suggesting a trip down to the Cage. Shaken, she fends off this sexual harassment and moments later, Mitch arrives. She sees Sterling in the hallway. She hugs Sterling, telling her that she's not to blame for Rosie's death. Sterling tells Mitch that Rosie was happy on Friday night and that she doesn't know whom Rosie may have been seeing. Later, teacher Bennet Ahmed (Brandon Jay McLaren) discovers Mitch on a bench in the hallway. He tells her that her daughter was a smart and eager girl. He shows her a copy of Rosie's favorite book.

Following Linden's orders, Holder rides the bus that Sterling had mentioned. He shows a picture of Rosie to the driver, but he doesn't remember every passenger's face. Holder is about to give up, when a new driver takes over. He shows this driver the picture and is told that she was an occasional passenger who rode to the end of the line. At the end of the bus line, Holder follows a student wearing a high school varsity jacket to the headquarters of the Seattle All-Stars after-school basketball program. He begins showing Rosie's photo around. He is directed to a photo of one of the teams, along with their coach, Bennet Ahmed. Meanwhile, Linden discovers several handwritten letters hidden in Rosie's room. She reads a lengthy one, which is signed "Bennet." At the high school, Bennet offers Rosie's book as a keepsake to Mitch.

== Production ==
In an interview with Mina Hochberg at AMCTV.com, Patrick Gilmore spoke about from whom he modeled his character, Tom Drexler: "The model they gave me was Mark Cuban. I don't think it's a direct impersonation, but it's definitely somewhere to start: a self-made millionaire, young, has the world at his hands and is able to manipulate the environment and the world around him. That's clearly something that Drexler has an ability to do."

== Reception ==
"A Soundless Echo" received favorable reviews. The A.V. Club's Meredith Blake rated this episode a B+, saying "In most other ways, the goal of this episode is establishing character and fleshing out backstory, rather [than] propelling the plot forward — though, on a show like The Killing, these things are all related anyway." Teresa L. of TV Fanatic gave the episode 3.5 out of 5 stars and stated "It was good to get some idea of Linden's motivation, but future [episodes] might need to give us a little more excitement to keep things from getting a little stale."

The episode was watched by 2.51 million viewers, a slight decline from the previous episode .

== Note ==
The letter discovered at the end of the episode is an excerpt from West with the Night by Beryl Markham. The letter states, "Dear Rosie, You're an old soul trapped in a young body. Go beyond the limits of what you know even if you're afraid. Try everything, feel everything, if only once. This passage made me think of you today."

"There are all kinds of silences and each of them means a different thing. There is the silence that comes with morning in a forest, and this is different from the silence of a sleeping city. There is silence after a rainstorm, and before a rainstorm, and these are not the same. There is the silence of emptiness, the silence of fear, the silence of doubt. There is a certain silence that can emanate from a lifeless object as from a chair lately used, or from a piano with old dust upon its keys, or from anything that has answered to the need of a man, for pleasure or for work. This kind of silence can speak. Its voice may be melancholy, but it is not always so; for the chair may have been left by a laughing child or the last notes of the piano may have been raucous and gay. Whatever the mood or the circumstance, the essence of its quality may linger in the silence that follows. It is a soundless echo." — Markham, West with the Night
