= Undertow (The Killing) =

- The Killing episode
- Episode no.: Season 1 Episode 9
- Directed by: Agnieszka Holland
- Written by: Dan Nowak
- Production code: BDH108/S108
- Original air date: May 22, 2011

Guest appearances
- Shukri Iman as Translator; Garry Chalk as Lieutenant Oakes; Kerry Sandomirsky as Principal Meyers; Jay Brazeau as Judge Elliot; Tom Butler as Mayor Lesley Adams; Colin Lawrence as Benjamin Abani; Brandon Jay McLaren as Bennet Ahmed; Ashley Johnson as Amber Ahmed; Peter Bryant as Imam Gelabi; Jarod Joseph as Muhammed Hamid

Episode chronology
| ← Previous "Stonewalled" | Next → "I'll Let You Know When I Get There" |
- The Killing (season 1)

"Undertow" is the ninth episode of the American television drama series The Killing, which aired on May 22, 2011. The episode was written by Dan Nowak and was directed by Agnieszka Holland. In the episode, after their warrant for Bennet Ahmed gets quashed, the detectives question an acquaintance of his. Mayoral candidate Darren Richmond puts an end to any personal attacks on his opponent. The Larsens take justice into their own hands.

== Plot ==
Sarah Linden (Mireille Enos) and Stephen Holder (Joel Kinnaman) listen, as a woman (Shukri Iman) translates Bennet Ahmed's wiretapped conversation. The caller tells Ahmed that the police know about the meat market and “the girl.” Linden calls for police to meet at Ahmed's apartment and tells Holder to prepare an arrest warrant for his judge friend to sign. Mitch Larsen (Michelle Forbes) calls Linden and asks if Ahmed has been arrested yet. Linden tells her that he soon will be. When Stan Larsen (Brent Sexton) arrives home, his wife tells him the news and they embrace.

Mayor Adams (Tom Butler) accuses his opponent Darren Richmond of slander in a press conference. He denies an affair, then claims that he is sterile from a medical procedure performed years earlier. Later, he instructs Benjamin Abani (Colin Lawrence) to double the payments to the pregnant teen and have his physician backdate records to support his medical claim. In Richmond's office, Jamie Wright (Eric Ladin) denies, to a reporter, his team’s involvement in the Adams leak. Linden arrives seeking more documents from Richmond (Billy Campbell), who again asks if Bennet Ahmed killed Rosie. Linden does not respond.

Judge Elliot (Jay Brazeau) declines to sign Holder’s wiretap warrant, saying the police misuse the anti-terrorism provisions of Patriot Act. Holder calls Linden to tell her that he was not successful, and she calls off Bennet Ahmed's arrest. The next morning, Oakes (Garry Chalk) scolds Holder for the wiretap attempt; Linden covers for him and says that it was her idea.

In Richmond's office, Gwen Eaton (Kristin Lehman) reports that a mosque has been defaced and Richmond calls off any future negative attacks on the Mayor. Richmond later visits the mosque, where Imam Gelabi (Peter Bryant) and his followers are removing anti-Muslim graffiti. Richmond promises to restore the mosque, but the imam feels that both Richmond and Adams are alike.

Mitch's sister Terry (Jamie Anne Allman) gives Mitch two of Rosie’s textbooks that she found in her car. Mitch says she'll return them to the high school. Upon arrival, she sees Bennet Ahmed (Brandon Jay McLaren) entering the school. Inside, Principal Meyers (Kerry Sandomirsky) asks Ahmed to leave. He replies that she should either fire him or let him teach. Later, he sees that someone has written the word “KILLER” on his classroom whiteboard, and all of his students walk out.

Linden finds a note in the mosque Quran. The note has a name, “Adela,” the word “Friday,” and a time written on it. She suggests that the time could be an appointment after the dance. Having accessed her husband's cell phone, Amber Ahmed (Ashley Johnson) arrives at the station and gives them Muhammed's phone number. Speaking about Muhammed and Ahmed, she questions their recent behavior.

After doing research, Holder tells Linden the phone number belongs to Muhammed Hamid. The phone is tracked to a downtown public market. While heading out to check on the new suspect, Linden is met by Mitch Larsen, who complains that Bennet Ahmed is back at school like nothing ever happened. At the market, Linden calls the cell phone and spots Muhammed (Jarod Joseph) in the crowd when he answers it. He notices her rushing toward him and flees, but she and Holder corner him.

At a bar, Gwen Eaton and Darren Richmond discuss the death of his wife. Eaton suggests letting the voters see that side of him. He vows to not use a personal tragedy to win the election and speaks of regret over losing his confidante, which seems to hurt Eaton. He later visits Tom Drexler (Patrick Gilmore) to request a $5 million donation for the Somali community. Drexler mocks him, then offers him a challenge. He tosses him a basketball, telling him that, if he makes the shot in just one try, the money is his. If Richmond misses, he should withdraw from the mayor's race. Later, at his office, Richmond places the basketball on his desk and smiles. He has won the challenge.

Holder and Linden ponder Muhammed Hamid’s reason to cooperate as he has no police record. While being questioned, Muhammed scoffs, in the Somali language, at the threats of jail time and the breakup of his family. Holder then insinuates that Bennet Ahmed will probably turn on Muhammed, because Ahmed is about to be a father. Hamid begins to speak in English and describes letting a girl into Ahmed's apartment, taking her to the meat market, and then moving her again. He refers to the girl as though she is still alive and Linden shows him a photo of Rosie Larsen. He says the girl in the picture dropped off a book and left that same night. When Linden asks who he was previously talking about, he describes Aisha Ramallah, the missing girl from the mosque. She was being forced into an arranged marriage and forced to undergo a painful and disfiguring female circumcision, from which he and Ahmed were trying to protect her. He leads the detectives to an apartment where Aisha Ramallah (Odessa Rojen) is hiding. Linden and Holder are stunned to see the youth of Aisha, whom Hamid had described as 12 years old. Linden then receives a call from Amber Ahmed. Her husband has not returned home.

Mitch, who presumes Ahmed has killed their daughter, accuses Stan of letting him go. Stan and Belko (Brendan Sexton III) drive Ahmed out of town. Ahmed protests, saying that he was helping another girl, but he gets dragged out of the vehicle. He makes a run for it, but Belko tackles him and brings him back to Stan, who savagely beats him. At home, doing laundry, Mitch finds Rosie’s pink T-shirt that she had told the detective was missing. She tries to reach Stan by phone, but to no avail.

== Production ==
In an interview with Mina Hochberg at AMCTV.com, Brandon Jay McLaren, who portrays Bennet Ahmed, spoke about the episode's final scenes: "I had a stunt double, but the double laid on the ground in the rain and I did most of the getting beat up. It was freezing that night — it must have been 25 degrees [Fahrenheit]. The ground was frozen, it was three in the morning, and we didn't have a lot of time to shoot it, so we did a quick rehearsal and actually Brent [Sexton] tagged me in the face during rehearsal. Brent's a big dude, so I was like, oh man. It was a hard scene to shoot, but it was definitely worth it in the end."

== Reception ==
"Undertow" received mixed reviews. The A.V. Club's Meredith Blake rated this episode a C, saying "The Killing has turned to increasingly outlandish plot twists in order to sustain itself another week. Each episode ends with a new, incriminating discovery, which, in short order the following week, is explained away as something innocuous." Teresa L. of TV Fanatic rated the episode 4 out of 5 stars, commenting "Another solid outing for this fresh show continues to leave viewers wanting more, even when the murder isn't close to being solved. Only more clues and detective work will unravel the mystery of who killed Rosie Larsen."

The episode was watched by 1.69 million viewers, the series’ lowest viewership.
