= What You Have Left =

- The Killing episode
- Episode no.: Season 1 Episode 6
- Directed by: Agnieszka Holland
- Written by: Nic Pizzolatto
- Production code: BDH105/S105
- Original air date: May 1, 2011

Guest appearances
- Garry Chalk as Lieutenant Oakes; Kerry Sandomirsky as Principal Meyers; Brian Markinson as Man in Suit; Tom Butler as Mayor Lesley Adams; Michael Roberds as Store Owner; Brandon Jay McLaren as Bennet Ahmed; Ashley Johnson as Amber Ahmed

Episode chronology
← Previous "Super 8"	Next → "Vengeance"
- The Killing (season 1)

"What You Have Left" is the sixth episode of the American television drama series The Killing, which aired on May 1, 2011 on AMC in the United States. The episode was written by Nic Pizzolatto and was directed by Agnieszka Holland. In the episode, the police further investigate Bennet Ahmed, which leads the Larsens to believe that he is a prime suspect. The mayoral candidates hold their televised debate, allowing the current mayor to bring up Richmond’s attachment to a murder suspect.

== Plot ==
Sarah Linden (Mireille Enos) investigates links between Rosie Larsen's case and those of other missing girls, telling Lieutenant Oakes (Garry Chalk) that a serial killer might have murdered Rosie. Holder (Joel Kinnaman) asks him about getting a search warrant for the Ahmed's apartment, but Oakes replies that they need more evidence for it. Sarah and Holder learn from a neighbor (Michael Roberds) that a girl arrived at Bennet's house on Friday at 10 p.m. He is shown a picture and confirms the girl was Rosie. Holder and Sarah question Bennet (Brandon Jay McLaren), asking if Rosie visited on Friday. He admits that she did, apologizing for forgetting that she dropped off a book after the dance. When asked to see the book, he says that they cannot without a search warrant. In order to determine how late Bennet stayed at the dance, Sarah makes a call to have school video checked. Later, Holder sits in a car with a man (Brian Markinson) who mentions the Larsen case. When told that Bennet is the prime suspect, he tells Holder that Stan Larsen previously provided muscle for Janek Kovarsky's mob and once had a gambling problem. At the police station, Holder interviews Amber Ahmed's sister who says that Amber arrived at her house at 1 a.m. the night of the dance, upset that Bennet was keeping secrets from her. Sarah later receives a call saying that Bennet was on tape at the dance at 11:20 p.m. and could not have let Rosie into his apartment.

Principal Meyers (Kerry Sandomirsky) visits Richmond (Billy Campbell) to tell him that the police are investigating Bennet. Gwen (Kristin Lehman) cancels the campaign advertisement featuring Bennet, and Jamie (Eric Ladin) advises Richmond to distance himself from him. Richmond resists. Senator Eaton (Alan Dale) later warns Richmond that he'll be committing political suicide if he doesn't cut Bennet loose. During a televised debate that occurs between him and the mayor, Richmond promises morality, using the Seattle All Stars program as an example. Mayor Adams (Tom Butler) asks if one of its mentors is the chief suspect in the Larsen murder, and, after Richmond defends Bennet, the mayor accuses him of coddling criminals.

The Larsens hold Rosie's wake in their garage, to which Bennet attends. Belko (Brendan Sexton III) receives a phone call from his high school contact. After hanging up, he relays news to Stan (Brent Sexton) that Bennet is the police's prime suspect. Back in Bennet’s neighborhood, Sarah learns from a resident with a telescope that at 12:03 a.m. the previous Saturday, he saw Bennet carrying a girl that was wrapped in a blanket and not moving. He added that Bennet had help carrying her, and they all left in a black car. Holder joins Sarah, and they knock on Bennet's door, but no one answers. Inside, Amber (Ashley Johnson), clutching a hammer, crouches on the floor. In the squad car, Holder tells Sarah that he has learned of Stan's connection to the Polish mob. Sarah urges him to call Bennet. Back at the wake, Bennet's cell phone, which he had placed on a table, rings, but he does not hear it. Bennet tells Stan about Rosie and is offered a ride so he can tell Stan more about her. Sarah and Holder later arrive at the garage to learn that Bennet is with Stan. In the van, Bennet points out that Stan has missed the exit to his house. Stan ignores him.

== Reception ==
“What You Have Left” received positive reviews. Meredith Blake of The A.V. Club rated this episode a B+, saying, "The Killing has once again returned to my good graces ... [This] episode was the liveliest and most engaging one since the pilot." Teresa L. of TV Fanatic rated the episode 4 out of 5 stars and stated, "Slow and somber, 'What You Have Left' was gently moving and highly intriguing. The episode matched others in its pacing, but the cliffhanger ending was a good change for the show."

The episode was watched by 1.81 million viewers, marking the series lowest ratings to date.
