= Vengeance (The Killing) =

- The Killing episode
- Episode no.: Season 1 Episode 7
- Directed by: Ed Bianchi
- Written by: Linda Burstyn
- Production code: BDH106/S106
- Original air date: May 8, 2011

Guest appearances
- Garry Chalk as Lieutenant Oakes; Tom Butler as Mayor Lesley Adams; Brandon Jay McLaren as Bennet Ahmed; Ashley Johnson as Amber Ahmed; Merrilyn Gann as Maryanne Thompson; Peter Bryant as Imam Gelabi

Episode chronology
← Previous "What You Have Left"	Next → "Stonewalled"
- The Killing (season 1)

"Vengeance" is the seventh episode of the American television drama series The Killing, which aired on May 8, 2011 on AMC in the United States. The episode was written by Linda Burstyn and was directed by Ed Bianchi. In the episode, Detectives Linden and Holder uncover more evidence about Bennet Ahmed; and Richmond’s decision to remain loyal to Bennet backfires.

== Plot ==
Stan Larsen (Brent Sexton) drives Bennet Ahmed (Brandon Jay McLaren) to a deserted dock and orders him out of the truck. Stan describes the way a daughter and father bond. Ahmed assures him that he did not hurt Rosie. Larsen drives away in his truck, leaving Ahmed behind. Back at the Larsen garage, Ahmed's cell phone rings, but Belko Royce (Brendan Sexton III) silences it, while Det. Holder (Joel Kinnaman) questions Mitch Larsen (Michelle Forbes) about her husband, alluding to Stan's mob past. He then tries to intimidate Royce if he doesn't reveal Stan’s location, but Royce remains stoic.

At the Ahmeds apartment, Bennet's pregnant wife Amber (Ashley Johnson) tells Det. Linden (Mireille Enos) that she was upset about young girls being around her husband so she drove to the dance on Friday night. She also says that Rosie had returned a copy of the Quran, that same night, and Bennet let the girl into the apartment. Det. Linden retorts that video from the dance proves that he is lying. After being asked who else has access to the apartment, Amber Ahmed says that her husband studies the Quran with a man named Muhammed, and that Muhammed has access to the apartment. As she tries to explain her uncertainty about Muhammed, her husband returns home, demanding that Linden leave. Outside, Linden looks inside the same Quran to find the name of a mosque is stamped inside. She calls Holder to tell him they need to check out the mosque.

The next morning, in the campaign office, Councilman Darren Richmond (Billy Campbell) argues with Jamie Wright (Eric Ladin) about the campaign’s continued attachment to Bennet. Left alone, Gwen Eaton (Kristin Lehman) spies an empty envelope on Darren Richmond’s desk from a women’s correctional facility. Richmond later arrives at the house of Maryanne Thompson (Merrilyn Gann), the mother of his dead wife, Lily, to discuss the parole hearing for the drunk driver who killed her. Maryanne suggests that Richmond is unable to forgive himself for Lily's death.

Mitch confronts Belko Royce for not telling her about Bennet. Belko replies that his contact said Bennet took Rosie to a room in the high school's basement.

Richmond learns that Mayor Adams (Tom Butler) has called an emergency city council session to freeze funding for the Seattle All-Stars program. Wright tells Richmond that, in order to save the program, he has to demand Bennet's resignation. At the session, which Mayor Adams attends, Richmond urges the council not to punish the program. He still loses the vote.

Linden and Holder drive to the mosque and ask its religious leader, Imam Gelabi (Peter Bryant), about Muhammed. While the three talk, a woman slips a note with an address into Linden's shoe. Linden and Holder go to the address, an abandoned meat market. She finds a door in the rear, and he kicks it open, while she reminds him they do not have a warrant and are illegally breaking in. Inside, Holder breaks into a locked meat vault that Linden has spotted. With flashlights, they enter the dark room, and, moments later, an FBI SWAT team storm in behind them. Linden and Holder are shoved down to the floor and ordered not to move.

== Production ==
In an interview with Mina Hochberg at AMCTV.com, Tom Butler spoke about his character, Mayor Lesley Adams: "What I like about playing Adams is his public persona versus his private persona and how he enjoys the game. I like that he can smile one second and be devious the next."

== Reception ==
"Vengeance" received generally positive reviews. The A.V. Club’s Meredith Blake rated this episode a B−, saying "Though its first few episodes had great potential, I’m afraid to say The Killing is at this point an unexceptional — if rather drawn-out — procedural. Only unlike most TV murder mysteries, it’s a serial drama." TV Fanatic’s Teresa L. rated the episode 4 out of 5 stars and commented "The beautifully acted scenes between characters, as well as the dramatic solo moments of some of the actors, created a slow simmering feeling of anger, frustration, and near desperation."

The episode was watched by 1.83 million viewers, a slight rise from the previous episode.
