= Stonewalled =

- The Killing episode
- Episode no.: Season 1 Episode 8
- Directed by: Dan Attias
- Written by: Aaron Zelman
- Production code: BDH107/S107
- Original air date: May 15, 2011

Guest appearances
- Garry Chalk as Lieutenant Oakes; Patrick Gilmore as Tom Drexler; Brian Markinson as Gil; Lee Garlington as Regi Darnell; Liam James as Jack Linden; Jillian Fargey as Donna Cantwell; Brandon Jay McLaren as Bennet Ahmed; Ashley Johnson as Amber Ahmed

Episode chronology
← Previous "Vengeance"	Next → "Undertow"
- The Killing (season 1)

"Stonewalled" is the eighth episode of the American television drama series The Killing, which aired on May 15, 2011, on AMC in the United States. The episode was written by Aaron Zelman and was directed by Dan Attias. In the episode, the detectives' investigation crosses paths with a federal one. Leaks of crime-scene photos to the press baffle both the police and the Larsens. Partial histories of both Holder and Richmond are revealed.

== Plot ==
While being handcuffed on the hidden room's floor, Det. Sarah Linden (Mireille Enos) looks around to see a sleeping area for a young girl, stopping on a pink T-shirt. She and Det. Stephen Holder (Joel Kinnaman) are released by the FBI. The FBI agents believe the two might have stumbled into a terrorism investigation. Outside, Lieutenant Oakes (Garry Chalk) scolds Linden for entering the building without a warrant. She tells him that the sleeping area could contain evidence related to Rosie's murder, but he forbids her to be anywhere near the place again. Later, she calls the station and asks for the Larsen case files to be emailed to her personal computer, saying that Oakes approves.

Stan Larsen (Brent Sexton) tells his wife Mitch (Michelle Forbes) that he has to take the boys to school, but she insists on doing it. In the garage, she realizes that she's forgotten something and leaves the boys in the car with the engine running. Upstairs, she sees a televised news report about Rosie's crime-scene photos and sits to watch it. Mitch's sister Terry (Jamie Anne Allman) soon enters the exhaust-filled garage and panics, but the boys are unharmed.

Outside the station, Linden sees Holder passing an envelope to someone in a car. Inside the station, FBI agents take away the Larsen files and evidence. Lt. Oakes shows Linden a newspaper with crime-scene photos and suspects another leak. He then excludes Det. Holder from a meeting with the federal agents. In the meeting, Linden learns about multiple border crossings of someone named Muhammed, and that maps and falsified passports were found at the market. Citing security reasons, the FBI refuses to give Muhammed's last name.

At City Hall, Jamie Wright (Eric Ladin) proposes hiring investigators to find something negative about Mayor Adams. Darren Richmond (Billy Campbell) approves, but forbids personal attacks. Hoping to get some more funding for Richmond's campaign, Wright meets Tom Drexler (Patrick Gilmore) at an underground mixed martial arts fight. After hearing that a private investigator has been hired to look into Mayor Adams, Drexler says he has information against the mayor. Wright later shows Richmond documents that he claims will surprise the councilman. Gwen Eaton (Kristin Lehman) says that the new information cannot be proven and is not relevant.

At the police station, Mitch berates Linden for the publication of the crime-scene photos and of doing nothing. At the FBI staging area outside the meat market, Linden poses as a Seattle detective and asks to see the evidence taken from the building. Left alone, she takes a picture of the pink shirt, before being caught and reprimanded by an FBI agent for breaching the evidence's chain of custody. Later, she visits Mitch to show her the photo of the pink shirt. Crying, Mitch identifies it as Rosie's, and then complains that Bennet Ahmed is still happily living his life. Upstairs, Mitch finds her husband has cleared out Rosie's room. Saying they need to focus on the future, he hints at knowing what happened with the boys in the garage. Mitch blames Stan for allowing Rosie to stay home alone on the weekend of the dance while they were out of town; he says that if Mitch had not been so strict, Rosie might not have kept secrets from them. She later restores Rosie's room to its previous state.

Back at the station, Lt. Oakes again scolds Linden for her activity at the staging area, then tells her that she should remove herself from the case, even though earlier he was the one demanding she delay her resignation and her move to California to pursue it. Outside, she sees Holder get into the car she saw earlier and follows him to a run-down neighborhood, where he attends a Narcotics Anonymous meeting. Outside the meeting room, she surreptitiously listens as he thanks his sponsor, Gil (Brian Markinson) (the man with whom he has been secretly meeting), and describes himself as sober for sixth months. He alludes to a dysfunctional upbringing and that he was raised by his sister. Haltingly and with shame he describes how, as a junkie, he stole his nephew's prized gold coin to sell for drug money. When Linden's phone rings at the end of his confession, he spots her as she tries to slip away. The call is from a mother, angry that Linden's son Jack emailed the photos of Rosie's crime scene to her son. In her car, Linden scolds her son for emailing the photos and causing the Larsens distress. He protests that she only cares about other people's families.

Councilman Darren Richmond attends the parole hearing of a woman (Jillian Fargey), who begs forgiveness for causing his wife's death. After the hearing, he punches a bathroom mirror, shattering it. On the drive back to City Hall, Richmond phones Gwen Eaton and tells her to release the information about the mayor to the press. Later, Richmond, Eaton and Jamie Wright listen to a news report the mayor paying the rent on the apartment of his former intern, who is 19 years old and pregnant.

Det. Holder meets with Linden to tell her that he has had a wiretap placed on Bennet Ahmed's phone and that he can get a friend who is a judge to allow any evidence. At his apartment, Ahmed (Brandon Jay McLaren) speaks excitedly on the phone, at times in the Somali language. Amber Ahmed (Ashley Johnson) overhears him speak about future passports. In the car with Linden, Holder receives a call. He tells her that they got something on the wire.

== Reception ==
"Stonewalled" received generally positive reviews. Meredith Blake of The A.V. Club rated this episode a B, saying "There were many—too many—moments of absurdity, but there were also several long overdue developments that made this feel like the breakthrough episode we’ve been waiting for weeks." TV Fanatic's Teresa L. rated the episode 4.5 out of 5 stars, commenting "This episode proved to the most compact and well-developed hour of the show. We found out a lot about characters that have remained somewhat aloof for weeks and saw some dangerous changes for others."

The episode was watched by 1.98 million viewers, the series’ highest viewership since the fifth episode.
