= El Diablo (The Killing) =

- The Killing episode
- Episode no.: Season 1 Episode 3
- Directed by: Gwyneth Horder-Payton
- Written by: Dawn Prestwich; Nicole Yorkin
- Production code: BDH102/S102
- Original air date: April 10, 2011

Guest appearances
- Garry Chalk as Lieutenant Oakes; Richard Harmon as Jasper Ames; Gharrett Patrick Paon as Kris Echols; VJ Delos Reyes as Lyndon Johnson Rosales; Lee Garlington as Ruth Yitanes; Tom Butler as Mayor Lesley Adams; Brandon Jay McLaren as Bennet Ahmed

Episode chronology
← Previous "The Cage"	Next → "A Soundless Echo"
- The Killing (season 1)

"El Diablo" is the third episode of the American television drama series The Killing, which aired on April 10, 2011 on AMC in the United States. The episode was co-written by Dawn Prestwich and Nicole Yorkin and was directed by Gwyneth Horder-Payton. In the episode, councilman Richmond suspects a leak within his team. Sarah tracks down a witness, which leads to a suspect, while trying to work with her new awkward partner Holder.

== Plot ==
At Fort Washington High, Sarah (Mireille Enos) discovers a peephole in The Cage. Principal Meyers (Kerry Sandomirsky) unlocks a room adjoining The Cage to which only she and school janitor Lyndon Johnson Rosales have a key. The peephole provides a clear view of The Cage. Later, Oakes (Garry Chalk) asks Sarah to remain on the job through the end of the week because he feels that Holder isn't currently capable of controlling the case. Holder (Joel Kinnaman) boasts to Sarah about finding the crime scene. She dismisses it as an assumption and orders him to stop intimidating suspects. In Rosales’ apartment, Holder distracts the mother while Sarah explores. When she notices a teen-themed porn magazine on the floor, Rosales (VJ Delos Reyes) comes up behind her and slashes her arm with a knife. Holder rushes him, with gun drawn, while Sarah pleads with Rosales that they just want to talk to him. He jumps out the window. At the hospital, Rosales is diagnosed with a skull fracture and rushed into surgery. While a medic stitches and bandages Sarah's arm, Holder lists the suspect's priors: indecent exposure and "kid diddlin'." He also notes that this suspect has an alibi: picked up for a DUI, he spent Friday night in the drunk tank. In his hospital room, Sarah questions Rosales. He confirms seeing Rosie, but not Jasper, at the Halloween dance. Pointing to a yearbook photo of Kris Echols, Rosales whispers, "El diablo (Spanish for 'the devil')."

Reporters ask mayoral candidate Richmond (Billy Campbell) about the Rosie Larsen case. He insists that the case is not about politics. Councilwoman Yitanes (Lee Garlington) calls Richmond a liar and says she's withdrawing her endorsement. At City Hall, Mayor Adams (Tom Butler) offers to endorse Richmond in four years, if he abandons his current campaign, and hints that the police had informed him about the discovery of Rosie in a campaign car. Later, Richmond tells Sarah about the Rosie press leak, but she denies the police as the source. He then meets secretly with Nathan (Peter Benson), who clears Jamie and Gwen of campaign car press leak but produces an office e-mail showing who leaked the Yitanes endorsement to the press. Richmond shows Gwen (Kristin Lehman) the e-mail — Jamie is the leak. They discuss Jamie's possible motivation for the betrayal. Gwen thinks that Jamie is playing both sides in the race, so he can feel like no matter who is elected, he has won either way. At a street basketball game to promote an anti-gang initiative, Richmond mentions the endorsement leak to Jamie, who blames the cops and then Yitanes, adding that everyone is playing both sides. In Richmond's office, Jamie comes up with a plan to win back Yitanes's endorsement by offering her husband a city plumbing contract. Gwen then accuses him of being the Yitanes leak. He claims that his computer was hacked, then accuses Richmond of letting sex (with Gwen) cloud his judgment and leaves. Yitanes enters Richmond's office, confronting him about his suggesting to the press that she'll still endorse him. Richmond offers her the contracting deal in return for her support. She later officially endorses Richmond during a press conference as Jamie quietly leaves the office with a box of his belongings under his arm.

Holder tells Oakes and Sarah about Kris (Gharrett Patrick Paon), a runaway expelled from high school and Jasper's best friend. Reviewing video from the dance, Sarah notices someone wearing a devil's mask. She whispers, “El diablo.” While visiting the Larsens, she reveals that Rosie's cause of death was drowning, then learns that Kris lived nearby until three years ago. At the police station, Kris's mother admits to Holder that she gave up on her son, adding that he mainly hangs out at a skateboard park. At the skate park, Holder smokes a joint and talks with a teenage girl, who confirms that Kris is a regular there. Returning to the car and reeking of smoke, Holder assures Sarah that what he is smoking is "narcscent", a substitute that narcotics officers use that looks, smells, and tastes like marijuana. After noticing that the skate park is within walking distance to the Richmond campaign office's parking lot, Sarah wonders if Kris stole the campaign car. Holder later spots Kris, pins him down, and asks if he caused Rosie to overdose. Sarah tells Holder to release Kris. Later, outside the school, Kris accuses Jasper (Richard Harmon) of telling the police they were at the dance. Watching from a distance, Sarah notes to Holder that Rosie wouldn't have entered The Cage with Kris, but would have with someone she trusted, “like Jasper.” Inside, after confiscating a cell phone from a student, a teacher (Brandon Jay McLaren) later hears it ring. While trying to silence it, he starts a video. At the police station, Sarah, Oakes, and Holder watch the cell-phone video. The footage shows a male, wearing a devil's mask, forcing himself on a girl in a pink wig and a witch costume. The male mentions Rosie's name. When the devil's mask is taken off, the male is revealed to be Jasper. Jasper then switches roles with the cameraman, who turns out to be Kris. Oakes tells his detectives to bring in both boys.

At the Larsen's apartment, father Stan (Brent Sexton) and the boys eat quietly. In the bathroom, Mitch (Michelle Forbes) clings to the side of the bathtub, crying.

== Production ==
In an interview with Mina Hochberg at AMCTV.com, Dawn Prestwich and Nicole Yorkin, co-writers of the episode and series producers, spoke about the excitement of working on the series: "We get away with doing the least amount of exposition possible," Prestwich began. "We want the audience to feel like they've just stepped into the world and nobody is going to stop and explain it to them. They need to keep up and join the team of Holder and Linden and learn along the way." Yorkin then stated: "Another thing was the fact that our lead character is a working mom and Dawn and I have been working moms our entire career. As has Veena [Sud, series creator]. You don't get to write a complex character..." Prestwich added, "...that is really lovable but makes mistakes. I mean, we don't approve of the way she is raising Jack and we know that she's failing in some ways." Yorkin finished with: "The interesting debate that we had in the room all the time (which I've talked to enough people now who watch the show to know they have the same debate) is Sarah a bad mom or is she just an imperfect mom like most of us? I think there are not many shows that portray a working mom this honestly."

== Reception ==
The episode received favorable reviews. Meredith Blake of The A.V. Club rated this episode a B, saying "So far, The Killing doesn’t offer much variety in terms of mood; it’s pretty much unrelenting gloom, with some moments of overwhelming menace thrown in for good measure. If it’s possible, [this] episode was darker and more disturbing than the premiere last week." TV Fanatic's Teresa L. rated the episode 4.5 out of 5 stars and stated "Although the format of The Killing will make it difficult to keep the ideas fresh and the plot developments realistic, the show still retains its authentic feel without becoming tiresome and boring. 'El Diablo' continued to showcase the unique qualities of this riveting crime drama."

"El Diablo" was watched by 2.56 million viewers, a slight drop from the previous episodes.
