= Missing (The Killing) =

- The Killing episode
- Episode no.: Season 1 Episode 11
- Directed by: Nicole Kassell
- Written by: Veena Sud
- Production code: BDH110/S110
- Original air date: June 5, 2011

Guest appearances
- Claudia Ferri as Nicole Jackson; Patti Kim as Roberta Drays; Liam James as Jack Linden; Steve Archer as Police Technician; Katie Findlay as Rosie Larsen

Episode chronology
← Previous "I'll Let You Know When I Get There"	Next → "Beau Soleil"
- The Killing (season 1)

"Missing" is the eleventh episode of the American television drama series The Killing, which aired on June 5, 2011. The episode is written by series creator Veena Sud and directed by Nicole Kassell. In the episode, the investigation into Rosie Larsen's death gets stalled, as the detectives must wait on a warrant. Their time is spent trying to find Jack, Sarah Linden's missing son.

== Plot ==
At the Wapi Eagle Casino, Detective Sarah Linden (Mireille Enos) speaks with casino manager Nicole Jackson (Claudia Ferri) and security chief Roberta Drays (Patti Kim), both of whom deny seeing Rosie. Sarah learns that the casino camera footage gets erased after 24 hours and asks to interview customers. Nicole tells her that she is on Indian land, which is not under state regulation, and orders her to leave. Outside the casino, Sarah calls a district attorney to obtain a warrant on the bank that owns the casino ATMs, so she can review their camera footage. Stephen Holder (Joel Kinnaman) arrives and they discuss the case. She tells him that Rosie's phone and backpack were never found and could be inside the casino. The girl had taken the last ferry to the island on Friday and must have spent the night there. Sarah tells him that the casino manager will offer no help. As her phone begins to ring, Holder calls his sister and leaves a voice mail, saying that he plans to attend his nephew's school event. Sarah's call is from her son Jack's school. He has been absent for the past three days. Holder drives Sarah to the motel, where she finds Jack's phone but not him. Thinking Regi might know where Jack may be, Holder drives Sarah to the marina. However, Regi has already sailed away on her boat. Sarah speaks to the mother of Jack's best friend by phone. She is told that Jack is the leader of a group of boys who cut class and gather at a place called The Tunnel.

Sarah drives Holder's car, while he navigates, to The Tunnel, a graffiti-covered area below a viaduct. Holder calls the place “hooky central.” When asked why kids run away from home, he replies that a kid sometimes runs away so someone will come looking. A group of kids soon arrive, but Jack is not among them. Holder believes that Regi has Jack. Sarah tells him that Regi is a social worker, whom she has known her whole life, and would not take Jack without telling her. After scouring the town, they take a rest at a restaurant, where he admits to becoming addicted to meth while undercover. He sought treatment after his boss found out he was using. He asks about the last case that obsessed Sarah. She tells him of a boy's father who had killed the child's mother. Child Protective Services took the boy, but Sarah feels that he will not be adopted.

Outside, Holder figures out the password on Jack's cell phone and Sarah finds three text messages from someone discussing meeting Jack. The last message was received as she was dropping him off at school that morning. Not knowing the identity of the messenger and only getting voice mail from people on Jack's contact list, she reports Jack as missing and requests an all-points bulletin. Holder takes Sarah back to a still-empty motel room and again calls his sister. In another message, he says he cannot make to the event, because he has to help a friend, swearing it is a legitimate excuse.

An hour later, the detectives resume their search for Jack. As Holder drives, Sarah tells him that she knows Seattle neighborhoods well. She was abandoned at the age of five by her mother and has lived in many foster homes. He upsets her by attributing this as the reason she is a flawed mother herself. She gets more angry with him, when he tells her that, two days earlier, Jack called him, after not being able to make contact with her or Regi, to ask for advice. She screams at him to stop the car, gets out and walks away. He apologizes and she returns to the car, telling him that he does not know anything about her.

As night falls, she directs him to a playground, recalling a happier moment there, dancing with Jack. She ponders when Jack stopped being happy. Later, a dispatch on the police scanner tells them about the discovery of the body of a young boy whose description resembles Jack. She orders him to go the scene. Arriving there, she rushes toward the tarp covering the victim, and he stops her before she can reach it. Another dispatch confirms that the child is not Jack, and she breaks down, sobbing. He takes her back to the motel, where they find Jack (Liam James) standing in the hallway. Holder suggests bodily harm to the kid, she smiles and goes to hug her son.

Outside in the car, Holder receives a call from the district attorney, saying that the casino ATM footage is being sent to the station. While inside their room, Jack tells Sarah that he has spent the day with his birth father. At the police station with a technician (Steve Archer), Holder watches footage of people making transactions at four ATMs. On one screen, he sees a young woman wearing a butterfly necklace with a pink blouse — Rosie Larsen (Katie Findlay).

== Reception ==
"Missing" received divisive reviews, which a few critics predicted would happen. Positive reviews appreciated that the episode allowed the characters to develop, something the show had been previously criticized for not doing. The A.V. Club's Meredith Blake rated the episode a B+, calling it "probably the best installment of The Killing since the pilot." She added, "'Missing' is a fine example of narrative digression done right, something that, up until now, The Killing has consistently gotten wrong." Negative reviews focused on the fact that, aside from the opening and closing, the episode did nothing to advance the main plot. Sean McKenna of TV Fanatic rated the episode just over 3 out of 5 stars, commenting "While I appreciate the devotion to character and background detail, I don’t want it to take away completely from the focus of the case. There needs to be a balance. And with only two episodes left, I'm now slightly afraid of the story being neatly and quickly wrapped up. Bow included." Even some of the positive reviews were a bit restrained in their praise, stating that the show would have been served far better if this episode had aired much earlier in the season.

The episode was watched by 1.98 million viewers, slightly higher than the previous episode.
