= Full Disclosure (2005 film) =

- Directed by: Douglas Horn
- Written by: Douglas Horn
- Produced by: Jannat Gargi; Susan LaSalle; Valerie McCaffrey
- Starring: Judy Greer; Brent Sexton; Laura Langwell
- Music by: BC Smith
- Release date: September 2005 (Palm Springs International Short Film Festival)
- Running time: 16 minutes
- Language: English

Full Disclosure is a 2005 short film about a man who decides to try dating with a policy of "Full Disclosure", revealing all his faults, big and small, to people he dates on the first date.
