= Just Like the Son =

2006 film by Morgan J. Freeman

- Directed by: Morgan J. Freeman
- Written by: Morgan J. Freeman
- Produced by: Gill Holland; Jamin O’Brien; Matthew Parker
- Starring: Mark Webber; Antonio Ortiz; Brendan Sexton III; Rosie Perez
- Cinematography: Yaron Orbach
- Edited by: Sloan Klevin
- Music by: Britta Phillips; Dean Wareham
- Production companies: SpaceTime Films; LaSalleHolland
- Distributed by: Breaking Glass Pictures
- Release date: April 29, 2006 (Tribeca)
- Running time: 86 minutes
- Country: United States
- Language: English
- Budget: $1,500,000 (est.)

Just Like the Son is a 2006 American drama film written and directed by Morgan J. Freeman. It was Freeman’s third film from an original screenplay and was shot during the summer of 2005 in New York City and Wilmington, North Carolina. The film premiered at the 2006 Tribeca Film Festival before making its European debut at the Rome Film Festival, where it won the Alice Nella Citta Prize for Best Feature Film. Breaking Glass Pictures released the film in North America on DVD/VOD.

== Plot ==
Daniel Carter, a 20-year-old delinquent, first meets six-year-old Boone while doing community service at an East Village grade school. The boys strike up a friendship, during which Daniel learns that Boone's mother is sick and may be hospitalized. He also learns that Boone has an older sister, Charlotte, who lives in Dallas. When Boone does not show up for school a few days later, Daniel begins to ask questions and learns that Boone was placed into a temporary foster care in Upstate New York. After being turned down as an adoption candidate and failing to convince his father to help him gain custody, Daniel decides to rescue Boone from the orphanage. He puts all his street smarts to use, and they head to Dallas. While the goal is to locate Boone's sister, the heart of the story is the unexpected bond Daniel and Boone form throughout their road trip adventure.

== Cast ==
- Mark Webber as Daniel Carter
- Antonio Ortiz as Boone
- Brendan Sexton III as Grant
- Rosie Perez as Mrs. Ponders
