= Gwyneth Horder-Payton =

American television director (born 1962)

- Born: December 10, 1962 (age 63); New York City, U.S.
- Occupation: Television director
- Years active: 1986–present

Gwyneth Horder-Payton (born December 10, 1962) is an American television director.

Beginning in the late 1980s, she worked as an assistant director on a number of films such as Pacific Heights, The Doors, Raising Cain, I Love Trouble, Homeward Bound II: Lost in San Francisco and other films.

She made her television directorial debut on the FX series The Shield, on which she was working as a first AD. Some of her subsequent television directing credits include The Riches, Bionic Woman, My Own Worst Enemy, Fringe, Battlestar Galactica, Criminal Minds, The Unit, Cold Case, Numb3rs, Blue Bloods, Sons of Anarchy, The Walking Dead, The Killing, NYC 22, Once Upon a Time, Hawaii Five-0, American Horror Story, Feud: Bette and Joan, 9-1-1, The Politician, 9-1-1: Lone Star and Big Sky.

Horder-Payton is the granddaughter of actor Victor McLaglen (The Informer), and the niece of director Andrew V. McLaglen (Shenandoah).

== Filmography ==
Year	Title	Notes
2006–2008	The Shield	Director, 5 episodes
2006–2009	Criminal Minds	Director, 3 episodes
2006–2009	The Unit	Director, 2 episodes
2007	The Riches	Director, episode "Been There, Done That"
2007	Bionic Woman	Director, episode "Do Not Disturb"
2008	Saving Grace	Director, episode "Are You an Indian Princess?"
2008	Fringe	Director, episode "The Equation"
2008	My Own Worst Enemy	Director, episode "Love In All the Wrong Places"
2008–2013	Sons of Anarchy	Director, 11 episodes
2009	Battlestar Galactica	Director, episode "No Exit"
2009–2010	Numbers	Director, 2 episodes
2010	Cold Case	Director, episode "The Good Soldier"
2010	Blue Bloods	Director, episode "Smack Attack"
2010	The Whole Truth	Director, episode "Cold Case"
2010–2011	The Walking Dead	Director, episodes "Tell It to the Frogs" and "What Lies Ahead"
2011	The Killing	Director, episode "El Diablo"
2011	Torchwood	Director, episodes "Immortal Sins" and "End of the Road"
2011	Prime Suspect	Director, episode "A Gorgeous Mosaic"
2012	Touch	Director, episode "Noosphere Rising"
2012	NYC 22	Director, episode "Block Party"
2012	Last Resort	Director, episode "Big Chicken Dinner"
2012	Hawaii Five-0	Director, episode "Death Wish"
2012–2014	Longmire	Director, 3 episodes
2012–2015	Justified	Director, 4 episodes
2012–2015	Once Upon a Time	Director, 6 episodes
2013	The Bridge	Director, 2 episodes
2014–2016	Tyrant	Director, 8 episodes; Co-executive producer, 22 episodes
2016–2024	American Horror Story	Director, 7 episodes
2017	The Americans	Director, episode "What's the Matter with Kansas?"
2017	Feud	Director, 2 episodes
2017	The Last Tycoon	Director, episode "Eine Kleine Reichmusik"
2018	American Crime Story	Director, 3 episodes
2018	9-1-1	Director, 5 episodes
2018–2019	Pose	Director, 5 episodes
2019–2020	The Politician	Director, 4 episodes
2020	9-1-1: Lone Star	Director, episode "Monster Inside"
2020–2021	Big Sky	Director, 4 episodes
2022	Pam & Tommy	Director, 2 episodies
2022	The Offer	Director, 2 episodes
2022	The Patient	Director, 2 episodes
2022	Welcome to Chippendales	Director, 2 episodes
2023	Rabbit Hole	Director, episode: "The Playbook"
2023	Justified: City Primeval	Director, episode: "Kokomo"
2024	Outer Range	Director, 2 episodes
2025	Long Bright River	Director, 2 episodes
2025	The Abandons	Director, 2 episodes
2026	M.I.A.	Director, episode "American Immigrant"
2026	Dark Matter	Director, 2 episodes
2026	R.J. Decker	Director, episode "Better Luck Tomorrow"
