= Jamie Anne Allman =

American actress (born 1977)

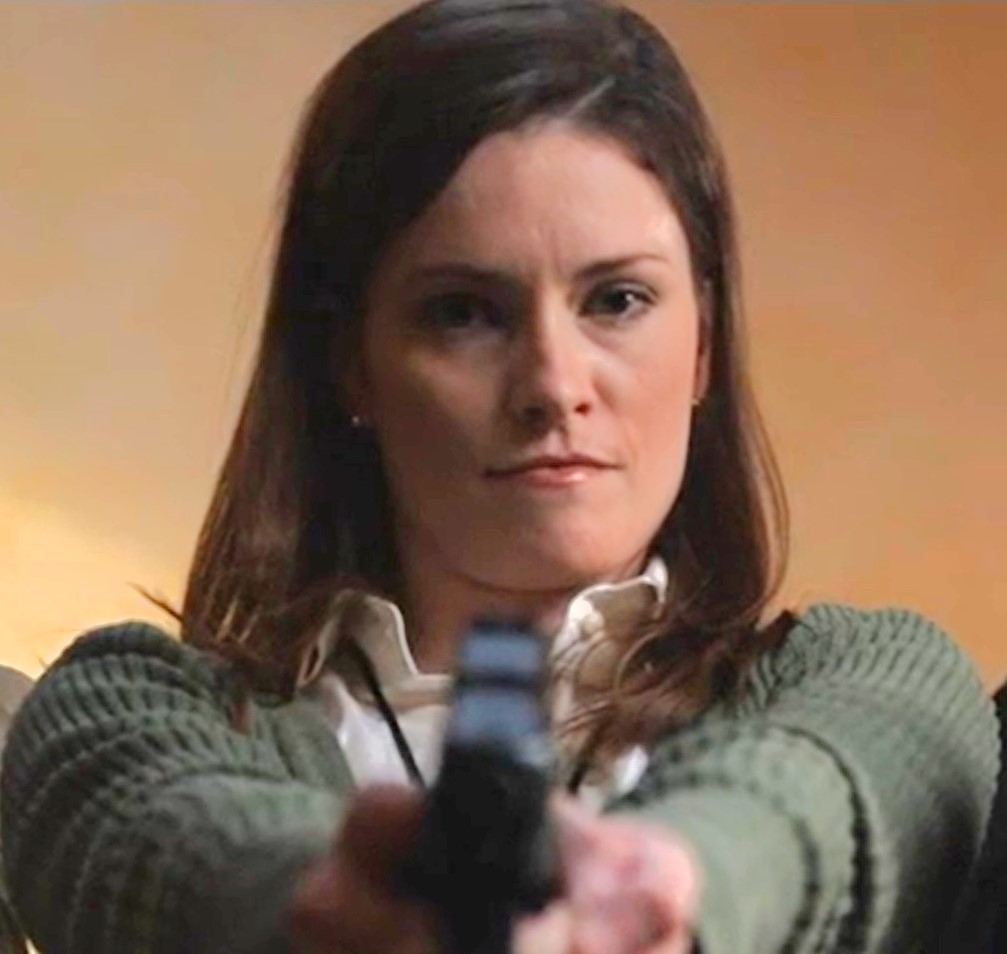
- Allman in The Love Affair, 2010 short film
- Born: Jamie Anne Brown; April 6, 1977 (age 49); Parsons, Kansas, U.S.
- Occupation: Actress
- Years active: 1999–present
- Spouse: Marshall Allman (m. 2006)
- Children: 3

Jamie Anne Allman (née Brown; born April 6, 1977) is an American actress. She is known for her role as Terry Marek on AMC's The Killing, and Connie Riesler on the FX police drama The Shield.

== Early life ==
Allman grew up on a farm in Kansas. Allman took acting classes at Playhouse West in Los Angeles.

== Filmography ==
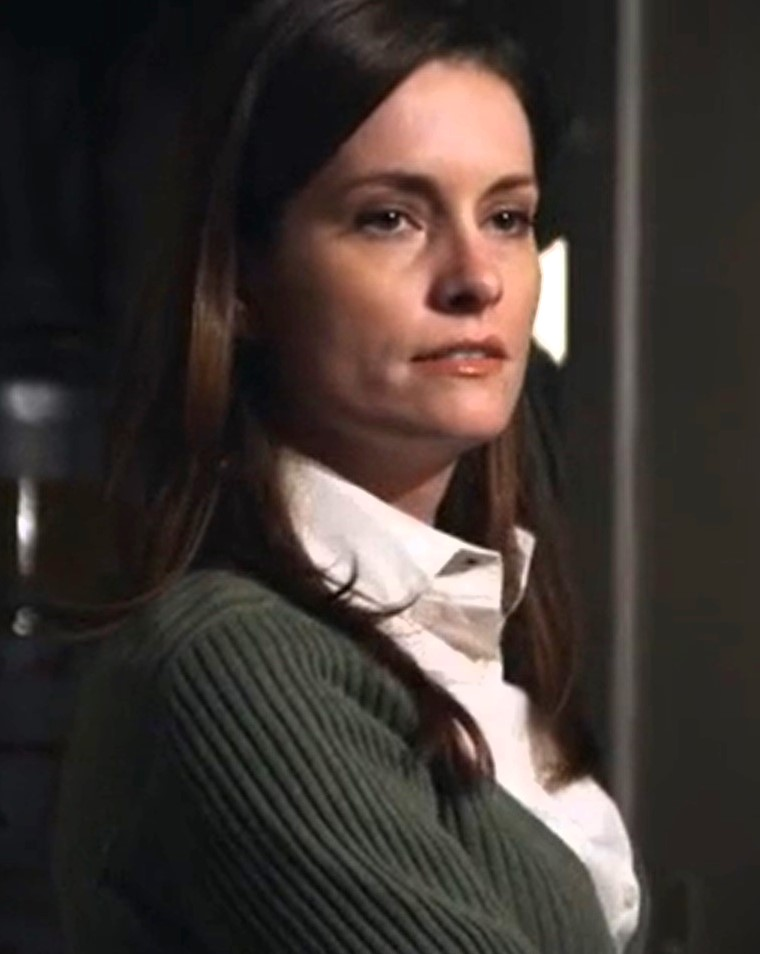
Allman in The Love Affair, 2010 short film

Film
Year	Title	Role	Notes
1999	Fashionably L.A.	Kassidy's Dresser	
2001	It Is What It Is	Iris	
2003	I Am My Resume	Kelly	Short film
2004	The Notebook	Martha Shaw	
2005	Automatic	Austin	
2005	AdCorp, Inc.	Trisha	Short film
2006	Steel City	Maria Lee	
2006	Danny Roane: First Time Director	Candice Sauvigne	
2007	A Day with the Urns	Jackie	Short film
2007	Prey 4 Me	Lisa	
2008	Prairie Fever	Olivia Thibodeaux	Video
2008	Just the World	Kate	Short film
2008	Farmhouse	Scarlet	
2008	In the Dark	Sharon	Short film
2009	Love After Life	Elizabeth	Short film
2009	A Hundred & Forty-Six Questions	Amanda	Short film
2009	The Donner Party	Eleanor Eddy	
2010	The Love Affair	Melanie Troy	Short film
2011	The Last Rites of Joe May	Jenny Rapp	
2012	Any Day Now	Marianna	
2016	The Salton Sea	The Driver	
2016	Six LA Love Stories	Mara Townsend	
2018	First Man	Times Reporter	
2023	Wayward	Bertie	

Television
Year	Title	Role	Notes
2000	The Fugitive	Bree Davis	Episode: "Pilot"; Episode: "The Hand of a Stranger"
2001	The Practice	Michelle Tritter	Episode: "Awakenings"; Episode: "Gideon's Crossover"
2001	Family Law	Chloe Frye	Episode: "Bringing Up Babies"
2001	NYPD Blue	Noelle Burnett	Episode: "Under Covers"
2001	Boston Public	Sharon	Episode: "Chapter 27"
2002	Six Feet Under	Junkie Woman	Episode: "The Invisible Woman"
2002	The Guardian	Mandy Gressler	3 episodes
2002	CSI: Miami	Jane Renshaw	Episode: "Just One Kiss"
2002–03	Fastlane	Sophia Jones	Episodes: "Wet" and "Slippery Slope"
2002–03	The Shield	Connie Riesler	7 episodes
2003	The Division	Allison Hardwin	Episode: "Diagnosis"
2003	Cold Case	Gwen Deamer (2003)	Episode: "Gleen"
2003	Threat Matrix	Hannah McLoughlin	Episode: "Natural Borne Killers"
2004	CSI: Crime Scene Investigation	Celeste Turner	Episode: "Paper of Plastic?"
2004	Century City	Sarah Flynn	Episode: "Only You"
2006	Monk	Jennie Mandeville	Episode: "Mr. Monk and the Big Reward"
2006	Close to Home	Tara Welch	Episode: "David and Goliath"
2007	K-Ville	Jessie	Episode: "Pilot"
2009	The Closer	Kelli Malone	Episode: "Double Blind"
2009	Saving Grace	Gloria Carter	Episode: "Am I Gonna Die Today?"
2009	Three Rivers	Laura	Episode: "The Luckiest Man"
2011	Covert Affairs	Bebe Langford	Episode: "Horse to Water"
2011–12	The Killing	Terry Marek	Series Regular
2014	Bones	Kara O'Malley	Episode: "Big in the Philippines"
2015	Chicago P.D.	Linda Sovana	Episode: "Born into Bad News"
2016	Longmire	Tamar Smith	Episode: "One Good Memory"; Episode: "A Fog That Won't Lift"
2016	Preacher	Betsy Schenck	
2018	S.W.A.T.	Lara Stone	Episode: "Contamination"
2018	The Arrangement	June Leighton	2 episodes
2019	I Am the Night	Tamar Hodel	Episode: "Aloha"
2019–20	Bosch	Elizabeth Clayton	12 episodes
2019	Criminal Minds	Stephanie Carter	Episode: "Sick and Evil"
2020	All Rise	Jordan Woodley	Episode: "Merrily We Ride Along"
2022	Candy	Elaine	4 episodes

== Personal life ==
Her husband, Marshall Allman, is also an actor. Allman delivered twin sons in 2013, and a daughter in 2014.
