= Jeremy Doner =

American screenwriter

- Born: April 10, 1972 (age 54); Detroit, Michigan, U.S.
- Education: Harvard University
- Occupation: Screenwriter
- Spouse: Mishna Wolff
- Children: 2

Jeremy Doner (born April 10, 1972) is an American screenwriter.

== Early life ==
Doner was born in Detroit, Michigan and grew up in the nearby village Franklin, though he and his family moved to SoHo, New York City when he was nine years old. He first became interested in writing when he visited an abandoned gas station called Space 2B which had been remodeled into a poetry and performance space where he listened to writers such as Pedro Pietri and Allen Ginsberg reading their work. He met Ginsberg, who convinced him to read his own poems at the space. Doner attended Harvard University, majoring in Biological Anthropology and Psychology and taking a number of film as literature classes. In his second year, he changed his major to English so that he could write a screenplay for his creative thesis. He had to go before a panel of seven professors to request to write a screenplay, as the first student to do so. He wrote his first script and, after graduating magna cum laude in 1994, used it to apply for the American Film Institute in Los Angeles as a screenwriting fellow, from where he graduated in 1996.

== Career ==
Doner's first feature was the 1997 made-for-television movie Legend of the Lost Tomb, based on Walter Dean Myers' young adult adventure novel. He wrote the adapted screenplay after working as a location accountant on the set of White Wolves II: Legend of the Wild, produced by Julie Corman, who he showed his experimental short scripts. She liked the scripts and asked him to write the script for the novel which she had optioned. She took the finished script to Showtime, who green-lighted the project. He was a writer on the legal drama series Damages, for which he was nominated for a Writers Guild of America Award with show's other writers in the 2008 New Series category. He is also the writer of three episodes for the serial crime drama The Killing. He also co-wrote the 2022 film biopic Elvis.
