= Brendan Sexton III =

American actor (born 1980)

- Born: Brendan Eugene Sexton III; February 21, 1980 (age 46); Staten Island, New York, U.S.
- Occupation: Actor
- Years active: 1994–present
- Spouse: Rachel Fisher

Brendan Eugene Sexton III (born February 21, 1980) is an American actor.

== Early life ==
Sexton was born in St. George, Staten Island.

== Career ==
Sexton made his film debut in Todd Solondz's Welcome to the Dollhouse playing the troubled bully Brandon McCarthy, for which he was nominated for an Independent Spirit Award. He was the lead in Hurricane Streets and Desert Blue and also appeared in Boys Don't Cry, Black Hawk Down, and Just Like the Son, as well as the cult films Empire Records, Pecker and Session 9.

He also starred in The Marconi Bros. alongside Dan Fogler and in Jonathan Blitstein's Let Them Chirp Awhile alongside Justin Rice.

Sexton owns and operates a New York City-based independent record label Big Bit of Beauty.

In a 2002 radio interview, Sexton said that the version of the film Black Hawk Down, in which he briefly appeared, which made it onto theater screens was significantly different from the one recounted in the original script. According to him, many scenes asking hard questions of the U.S. troops with regard to the violent realities of war, the true purpose of their mission in Somalia, etc., were cut out.

== Filmography ==
=== Film ===
Key
†	Denotes works that have not yet been released

Year	Title	Role	Notes
1995	Welcome to the Dollhouse	Brandon McCarthy	
1995	Empire Records	Warren	
1997	Hurricane Streets	Marcus	
1997	Arresting Gena	Soldier	
1997	A, B, C... Manhattan	Bob	
1997	The Devil & the Angel	Street Thug #1	
1998	Spark	Moony	
1998	Pecker	Matt	
1998	Desert Blue	Blue Baxter	
1999	Boys Don't Cry	Tom Nissen	
2000	Muse 6	Dez	
2000	Herschel Hopper: New York Rabbit	Herschel	
2001	Session 9	Jeff	
2001	Black Hawk Down	PVT Richard "Alphabet" Kowalewski	
2004	Winter Solstice	Robbie	
2005	Love, Ludlow	Ludlow	
2005	Hide and Seek	Store Clerk	Uncredited
2005	This Revolution	Daniel Symptom	
2006	Just Like the Son	Grant	
2006	Little Fugitive	Frank	
2007	The Girl in the Park	Stuart	
2007	The Secret (Si j'étais toi )	Ethan	
2007	Neal Cassady	Little Big	
2007	Let Them Chirp Awhile	Scott	
2008	The Marconi Bros.	Anthony Marconi	
2008	B.O.H.I.C.A.	Fish	
2009	The Messenger	Recruiter Olson	
2009	Winter of Frozen Dreams	Jerry Davies	
2009	Everybody's Fine	Mugger	
2010	The Runaways	Derek	
2010	The Truth	Gabriel Doyle	
2010	Footsteps	Douglas Denenberg	
2011	In My Pocket	Eric	
2012	Seven Psychopaths	Young Zachariah	
2012	Yellow	Nowell	
2013	The Odd Way Home	Dave	
2013	The Trials of Cate McCall	Rusty Burkhardt	
2013	7E	Clyde	
2014	Glass Chin	Jimmy Musial	
2014	10 Cent Pistol	Donny	
2014	Beautiful Girl	William	
2015	Welcome to Happiness	Nyles	
2015	Addiction: A 60's Love Story	Jay Klein	
2015	Dark	John	
2017	Three Billboards Outside Ebbing, Missouri	Crop-Haired Guy	
2017	New Money	Steve Purdy	
2018	White Orchid	James	
2018	American Nightmares	Tommy Deuchet	
2019	El Camino: A Breaking Bad Movie	Kyle	
2019	The Voices	David	
2020	Juke Box Hero	Allan	
2020	Chronicle of a Serial Killer	Henry Brolin	
2021	Faceless	George	
2021	Don't Breathe 2	Raylan	
2022	Sniper: Rogue Mission	Gildie	Direct-to-video
2023	God Is a Bullet	Granny Boy	
2024	Shelby Oaks	Robert Walker	
2025	Blood Shine	Keith	
TBA	Untitled David Mackenzie film †		Post-production

=== Television ===
Year	Title	Role	Notes
2003	The Finkel Files	Eli	Television film
2009	Life on Mars	Danny Krasner	Episode: "Revenge of Broken Jaw"
2011–2012	The Killing	Belko Royce	15 episodes
2013	Mob City	Jerry Edelstein	2 episodes
2014	Chicago P.D.	Ian Marks	Episode: "An Honest Woman"
2014	Stalker	Robbie Dalton	Episode: "Fanatic"
2016	Riders	Greg	Episode: "A Trip at a Wedding"
2016, 2018	Drunk History	Felix / Thomas Benton	2 episodes
2019–2022	Russian Doll	Horse	6 episodes
2020	FBI	Mike Helton	Episode: "Safe Room"
2023	Beyond Belief: Fact or Fiction	Milton	Episode: "Die blutige Spur"
2025	Ballard	Anthony Driscoll	
