= Brent Sexton =

American actor

- Born: St. Louis, Missouri, U.S.
- Occupation: Actor
- Years active: 1989–present

Brent Sexton is an American actor best known for his roles in the television series Bosch, The Killing, Life, and Deadwood. He has guest starred in several other television series, such as The Expanse, Justified, That's Life, Birds of Prey, Law & Order: Special Victims Unit, and Judging Amy. He has also appeared in several motion pictures, such as In the Valley of Elah, Flightplan, Radio, and A.I. Artificial Intelligence.

In 2006, Sexton, along with the cast of Deadwood, was nominated for a Screen Actors Guild Award.

== Early life ==
Sexton was born in St. Louis, Missouri. He studied at Missouri State University.

== Career ==
Sexton toured internationally with a theater company as both Officer Krupke and Detective Schrank in West Side Story.

== Filmography ==
Film
Year	Title	Role	Notes
1994	The Specialist	Manny	
2001	Double Take	NYPD Cop	
2001	Zoe	Lonnie	
2001	A.I. Artificial Intelligence	Russell	
2001	The Glass House	Mechanic	
2001	Vanilla Sky	Security Guard	
2002	It's All About You	Security Guard	
2002	Enough	FBI Agent	
2003	Nines	Bud	Short film
2003	Radio	Honeycutt	
2003	The Man Who Invented the Moon	Tommy	Short film
2004	Fish Burglars	Aquarium Guard	Short film
2004	Criminal	Ron	
2005	Wheelmen	Goon #1	
2005	Flightplan	Elias	
2005	Full Disclosure	Everett	Short film
2007	In the Valley of Elah	Lt. Burke	
2008	W.	Joe O'Neill	
2008	Pants on Fire	Phil	
2009	Within	Steven Lowe	
2009	Hostage: A Love Story	Therapist	Short film
2016	The Belko Experiment	Vince Agostino	
2020	Irresistible	Mayor Braun	
2022	Gigi & Nate	Sgt. Ellis	
2023	Miranda's Victim	Sergeant Nealis	

Television
Year	Title	Role	Notes
1989–1990	B.L. Stryker	David / Maxie	2 episodes
1999	Angel	Beat Cop	1 episode
1999	Profiler	Car's Driver	1 episode
1999	Chicken Soup for the Soul	Will Bailey	1 episode
1999–2000	It's Like, You Know...	Waiter	2 episodes
1999–2001	Judging Amy	Oscar Ray Pant, Jr.	5 episodes
2000	Walker, Texas Ranger	Breen	1 episode
2000	Chicago Hope	Mary's Orderly	1 episode
2000	3rd Rock from the Sun	Duke	1 episode
2000–2001	The X-Files	Gravedigger / Steven Melnick	2 episodes
2001	V.I.P.	Koster	1 episode
2001	Jack & Jill	Heffer	1 episode
2001	Special Unit 2	Edwards	1 episode
2001	Boston Public	Calvin Scott	1 episode
2001	CSI: Crime Scene Investigation	Mark Doyle	1 episode
2001	Becker	Christopher Hayes	1 episode
2001	NYPD Blue	Roy Wessner	1 episode
2001–2002	That's Life	Jimmy Stovic	4 episodes
2001–2002	Will & Grace	Guard / Prison Guard	2 episodes
2002	7th Heaven	Security Guard	1 episode
2002	The Guardian	Tom Burke	1 episode
2002	Birds of Prey	Detective McNally	5 episodes
2003	My Wife and Kids	Blue-Collar Guy	1 episode
2003	24	Frank Davies	2 episodes
2003	The District	Ray Innis	1 episode
2003	Senor White		Television film
2003	Saving Jessica Lynch	Greg Lynch Sr.	Television film
2004	JAG	Lance Corp. Buddy Petrosian	1 episode
2004	The Shield	Paul Fets	1 episode
2004	Six Feet Under	Lou Thornton	1 episode
2004	Plainsong	Bud Sealy	Television film
2005	Cold Case	Ken Bream in 1998	1 episode
2005	Grey's Anatomy	Jerry Frost	1 episode
2005	Surface	Bud	3 episodes
2005–2006	Deadwood	Harry Manning	14 episodes
2006	Smith	Mark Langley	1 episode
2006	Standoff	Avery Steele	1 episode
2007	Without a Trace	Sergeant Paul Brown	1 episode
2007	Weeds	Cliff Haskel	1 episode
2007–2009	Life	Officer Robert Stark	25 episodes
2009	Psych	County Sheriff Becker	1 episode
2009	The Mentalist	Doc Sinclair	1 episode
2010	Lie to Me	Thomas Fletcher	1 episode
2010–2013	Justified	Sheriff Hunter Mosley	5 episodes
2011	The Morning After	Himself	1 episode
2011–2012	The Killing	Stan Larsen	25 episodes
2013	Ironside	Gary Stanton	9 episodes
2013–2016	Shameless	Patrick Gallagher	2 episodes
2015	American Crime	Tommy	1 episode
2015–2016	CSI: Cyber	Andrew Michaels	3 episodes
2015	Complications	Robert Holden	5 episodes
2016	Bosch	Carl Nash	10 episodes
2016	Hawaii Five-0	Marvin Osweiler / Kyle Kane	1 episode
2016	Designated Survivor	Gabriel Thompson	1 episode
2017	Law & Order: Special Victims Unit	Jim Turner	1 episode
2018	Unsolved	Detective Brian Tyndall	7 episodes
2018–2020	God Friended Me	Ray Nicolette	3 episodes
2018	Dream Corp LLC	Father	1 episode
2019	Deadwood: The Movie	Harry Manning	Television film
2019	Mindhunter	Garland Periwinkle	2 episodes
2019	Unbelievable	Al	3 episodes
2020	Chicago P.D.	Sergeant Kenny Nolan	3 episodes
2020–2021	The Expanse	Cyn	7 episodes
2021	Hacks	Michael	1 episode
2021	Impeachment: American Crime Story	Dick Morris	1 episode
2022	Long Slow Exhale	Arlin Swayne	6 episodes
2023	Paul T. Goldman	Royce Auditioner	1 episode
2024–present	Tracker	Keaton	3 episodes
2025	Countdown	Dennis	1 episode
