= Brandon Jay McLaren =

Canadian actor

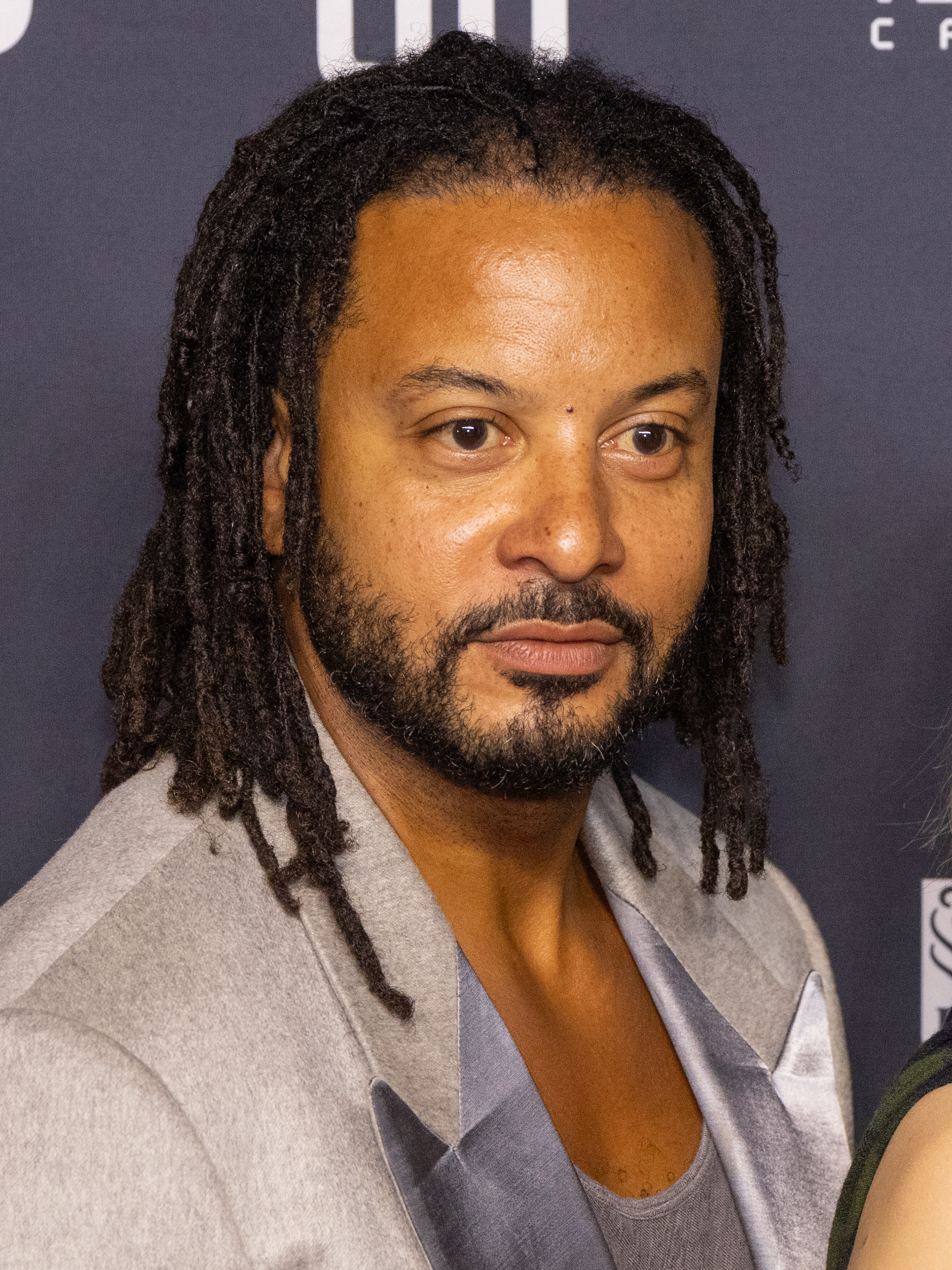
- McLaren in 2025
- Born: Vancouver, British Columbia, Canada
- Education: University at Albany
- Occupation: Actor
- Years active: 2002–present
- Spouse: Miekka Tennent (divorced)

Brandon Jay McLaren is a Canadian actor. He made his first screen appearance in the television series Just Cause (2002). He has been known for his main and supporting roles in shows such as Graceland, Power Rangers S.P.D., Ransom, Harper's Island, The Rookie, and Slasher. He has also had roles in the feature films She's the Man, Tucker & Dale vs. Evil, and Dead Before Dawn.

In 2005, McLaren gained prominence with the main role of Jack Landors, the Red Ranger in Power Rangers S.P.D.. Since then, he has had a variety of roles in several films and television series.

== Early life ==
McLaren was born to Ira and Denise McLaren in Vancouver, British Colombia. He is of Grenadian and Trinidadian descent. He graduated from Johnston Heights Secondary School in Surrey, and received a bachelor's degree in Human Biology from the University at Albany, SUNY. McLaren attended SUNY on an athletic scholarship and was part of the school's NCAA Division I soccer team.

== Career ==
McLaren was a guest star in the episode "Bloodlines" of Blade: The Series and was featured throughout the first season of The N original television series The Best Years as Devon Sylver, the love interest of lead character Samantha Best. He is also well known to Canadian audiences for his role of Lenin, Sam's love interest, in the popular show Being Erica, and he portrayed Jamil Dexter as a recurring role on TNT's Falling Skies. He also starred as U.S. Customs agent Dale Jakes on Graceland, Marco on Girlfriends' Guide to Divorce, Danny Booker on Chicago Fire and Bennet Ahmed on The Killing. He also played the role of Xavier Wilson in the Disney+ series, Turner & Hooch.

== Personal life ==
McLaren was previously married to Miekka Tennent. They divorced in 2014.

== Awards ==
McLaren was awarded the Golden Maple Award for Best Actor in a TV series broadcast in the U.S. in 2015, for his role on Graceland.

== Filmography ==
=== Films ===
Year	Film	Role	Notes
2003	D.C. Sniper: 23 Days of Fear	Eye Witness	TV movie
2004	Scooby-Doo 2: Monsters Unleashed	Skater Dude #2	
2004	Perfect Romance	Rude student	TV movie
2004	Have You Heard? Secret Central	Eddie Edwards	Video
2006	She's the Man	Toby	
2007	Ashes Fall	Owen	Short
2007	Hybrid	Ashmore	TV movie
2007	Scar	Howard	
2008	Love Sick: Secrets of a Sex Addict	Gabriel	
2008	Vice	Gangbanger Driver	
2008	Yeti: Curse of the Snow Demon	Rice	TV movie
2008	Sea Beast	Drew	TV movie
2009	Dr. Dolittle: Million Dollar Mutts	Brandon Turner	Video
2009	Love Happens	Mohawk	
2009	Cole	Clay	
2009	Messages Deleted	Dude up Front	
2010	Tucker & Dale vs. Evil	Jason	
2010	Ratko: The Dictator's Son	Juwaan	
2010	Hard Ride to Hell	Dirk	Video
2011	Two Knots	Devon	Short
2012	Dead Before Dawn	Ricky "Dazzle" Darlington	
2013	Plush	Butch Hopkins	
2013	Seasick Sailor	Big Guy	Short
2015	Almost Anything	Will	
2015	Romantically Speaking	Dave	TV movie
2020	Marry Me This Christmas	Daniel English	TV movie

=== Television ===
Year	Title	Role	Notes
2002	Just Cause	Maurice	Episode: "Blackboard Jungle"
2003	Black Sash	Antoine	Episode: "Snapshots"
2004	The Chris Isaak Show	Clerk	Episode: "The Little Mermaid"
2004	Smallville	Delivery Man	Episode: "Covenant"
2004	The Collector	Posse Member #1	Episode: "The Rapper"
2004	The Days	Trey Morgan	Recurring Cast
2005	Reunion	Anthony Marjorino	Episode: "1992"
2005	Power Rangers S.P.D.	Jack Landors/Red S.P.D. Ranger	Main Cast
2006	Blade: The Series	Run Run	Episode: "Bloodlines"
2006	Smallville	Yance	Episode: "Fallout"
2007–09	The Best Years	Devon Sylver	Main Cast: Season 1, Guest: Season 2
2009	Kyle XY	College Student	Episode: "Welcome to Latnok"
2009	Harper's Island	Danny Brooks	Main Cast
2009	CSI: Crime Scene Investigation	Anthony Samuels	Episode: "The Lost Girls"
2010	Human Target	Omar	Episode: "Run"
2010–11	Being Erica	Lenin	Recurring Cast: Season 3-4
2011	R.L. Stine's The Haunting Hour	Major Mayhem	Episode: "Game Over"
2011–12	The Killing	Bennett Ahmed	Recurring Cast: Season 1, Guest: Season 2
2012	Falling Skies	Jamil Dexter	Recurring Cast: Season 2
2013–15	Graceland	Dale Jakes	Main Cast
2015	Motive	Lee Ward	Episode: "The Suicide Tree"
2015	Girlfriends' Guide to Divorce	Marco	Recurring Cast: Season 1-2
2016	Slasher	Dylan Bennett	Main Cast: Season 1
2016	Chicago Fire	Danny Booker	Recurring Cast: Season 4
2017	Criminal Minds	Adrian Scott	Episode: "Blue Angel"
2017–19	Ransom	Oliver Yates	Main Cast
2018	UnREAL	Dr. Simon	Recurring Cast: Season 3
2020	The Twilight Zone	Frisch	Episode: "8"
2021	Firefly Lane	Travis	Recurring Cast: Season 1
2021	Turner & Hooch	Xavier Wilson	Main Cast
2021–26	The Rookie	Elijah Stone	Recurring Cast: Season 4-5, Guest: Season 8
2022	Everything's Trash	Hamilton Hayes	Recurring Cast
2022–23	Snowfall	Beau Buckley	Recurring Cast: Season 5-6
2023	The Rookie: Feds	Elijah Stone	Episode: "Payback"
2024	The Cleaning Lady	Jeremy Dolan	Recurring Cast: Season 3
2025	Wayward	Dwayne Andrews	Recurring Cast
2026	Chicago Med	Jason Walker	Recurring Cast: Season 11
