= Kristin Lehman =

Canadian television actress and director (born 1972)

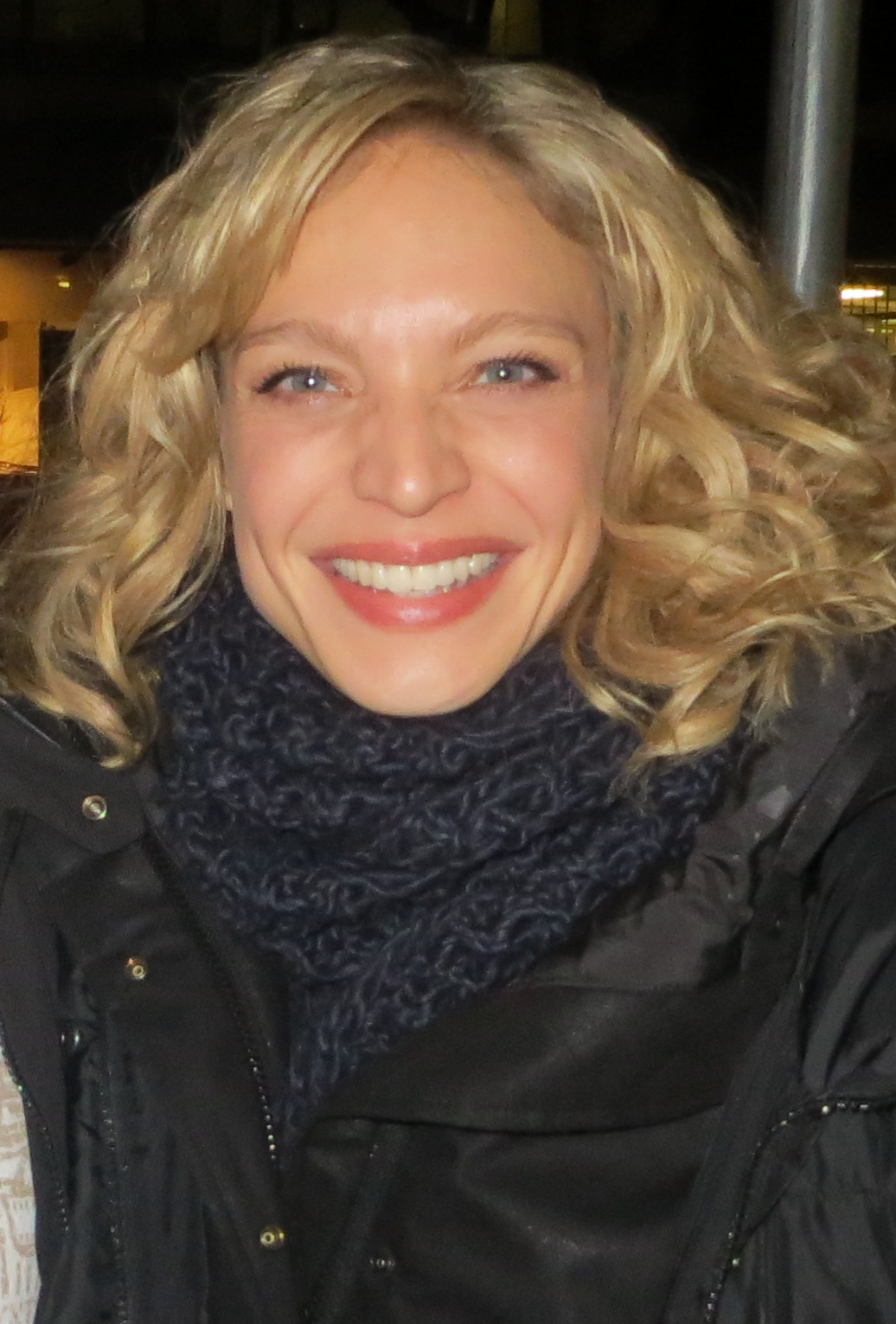
- Lehman on the set of Motive in November 2012
- Born: Kristin Lehman; May 3, 1972 (age 54); New Westminster, British Columbia, Canada
- Occupations: Actress, director
- Years active: 1995–present
- Spouse: Adam Reid
- Children: 1

Kristin Lehman (born May 3, 1972) is a Canadian television director and actress, known for her roles in the television series Poltergeist: The Legacy, Judging Amy, and The Killing. From 2013 to 2016, she starred as Detective Angie Flynn in the CTV series Motive. In 2018, Lehman played Miriam Bancroft, wife of Laurens Bancroft, in Season 1 of Netflix's Altered Carbon.

== Life and career ==
Lehman was born in New Westminster, British Columbia, grew up in Vancouver and studied classical ballet at Canada's Royal Academy of Dance for eight years. She has acted professionally since 1995. In the 1990s, she appeared in Canadian programs such as Forever Knight, Due South and Kung Fu: The Legend Continues, before moving to Los Angeles.

Lehman was a regular cast member in the Showtime horror series Poltergeist: The Legacy (1998–99). She later starred in the short-lived ABC medical drama Strange World (1999). She also was a regular cast member in the short-lived dramas Century City, Tilt, Killer Instinct and Drive. Lehman also appeared in recurring roles in Felicity and Judging Amy, and played guest roles on many shows, including The Outer Limits, The Twilight Zone, Andromeda, Kevin Hill, Prison Break, and Castle.

Lehman's film credits include Alaska (1996), Bleeders (1997), Dog Park (1998), The Way of the Gun (2000), Lie with Me (2005), The Sentinel (2006), The Loft (2014), and television movies Playing House, Rapid Fire and The Gathering.

Lehman starred in AMC's drama series The Killing from 2011 to 2012, and she played the lead role in the Canadian series Motive for four seasons.

== Personal life ==
Lehman is married to actor Adam Reid, and they have a son.

== Filmography ==
=== Acting ===
==== Film ====
Year	Title	Role	Notes
1996	Alaska	Florence	
1997	Bliss	Scope / Steps Woman	
1997	Bleeders	Kathleen Strauss	
1998	Dog Park	Keiran	
1999	Dinner at Fred's	Sarah Billings	
2000	The Way of the Gun	Francesca Chidduck	
2004	The Chronicles of Riddick	Shirah	Director's cut
2005	Lie with Me	Rachel	
2006	The Sentinel	Cindy Breckinridge	
2014	The Loft	Det. Higgins	
2019	Lie Exposed	Mickey	

==== Television ====
Year	Title	Role	Notes
1995	The Commish	Cynthia	Episode: "Off Broadway: Part 1"
1995–1996	Forever Knight	Urs	4 episodes
1996	Toe Tags	Chana	TV movie
1996	Ed McBain's 87th Precinct: Ice	Tina	TV movie
1996	Due South	Rhonda	Episode: "Flashback"
1996	F/X: The Series	Katiya	Episode: "F/X: The Illusion"
1996	Kung Fu: The Legend Continues	Det. Jordan McGuire	6 episodes
1996	The Outer Limits	Janet Marshall	Episode: "Falling Star"
1997	The Outer Limits	Katya Rubinov	Episode: "Dead Man's Switch"
1997	PSI Factor: Chronicles of the Paranormal	Jackie Kinley / Julie Bright	Episode: "The Undead, The Stalker"
1997	Once a Thief	Alexa Lundquist	Episode: "Art of Death"
1997	Earth: Final Conflict	Cynthia Clarkson	Episode: "Resurrection"
1998	The X-Files	Esther Nairn / Invisigoth	Episode: "Kill Switch"
1998–1999	Poltergeist: The Legacy	Kristin Adams	Main cast (seasons 3–4)
1999	Strange World	Dr. Sidney MacMillan	Main cast
2000	The Outer Limits	Larissa	Episode: "Stasis"
2001	Felicity	Avery Swanson	4 episodes
2001	Go Fish	Laura Eastwood	Main cast
2001	The Outer Limits	Lorelle Palmer	Episode: "Time to Time"
2002	UC: Undercover	Diane Robertson	Episode: "Manhunt"
2002	Verdict in Blood	Shannon Blackwell	TV movie
2002–2003	Judging Amy	Dr. Lily Reddicker	Recurring role (seasons 4–5)
2002	The Twilight Zone	Becca Niles	Episode: "Dead Man's Eyes"
2002	Andromeda	Molly Noguchi	Episode: "Lava and Rockets"; Episode: "Waking the Tyrant's Device"; Nominated – Gemini Award for Best Performance by an Actress in a Guest Role in a Dramatic Series
2004	Century City	Lee May Bristol	Main cast
2004	Kevin Hill	Serena Quinn	Episode: "Going for the Juggler"
2005	Puppets Who Kill	Honeypot	Episode: "Buttons on a Hot Tin Roof"
2005	Tilt	Ellen / Miami	Main cast
2005	G-Spot	Francesca	Main cast (season 1)
2005	Burnt Toast	Debra	TV movie
2005–2006	Killer Instinct	Det. Danielle Carter	Main cast
2006	Damages	Susan Keever	TV movie
2006	Playing House	Marina	TV movie
2006	Prison Break	Jane Phillips	Episode: "Rendezvous"; Episode: "Bolshoi Booze"
2006	Rapid Fire	Angela	TV movie
2007	Backyards & Bullets	Caroline Garrison	TV movie
2007	Drive	Corinna Wiles	Main cast
2007	The Gathering	Ann Foster	Miniseries
2010	Human Target	District Attorney Allyson Russo	Episode: "Run"
2011–2012	The Killing	Gwen Eaton	Main cast (seasons 1–2)
2011	Castle	Serena Kaye	Episode: "Eye of the Beholder"
2012	The Firm	Dr. Elle Larson	Episode: "Chapter Four"
2013–2016	Motive	Detective Angie Flynn	Lead Role; Nominated – Canadian Screen Award for Best Performance by an Actress in a Continuing Leading Dramatic Role (2016); Nominated – Canadian Screen Award for Best Performance by an Actress in a Continuing Leading Dramatic Role (2017); Won – Leo Award for Best Lead Performance by a Female in a Dramatic Series (2017)
2017	Rogue	Theresa Archer	Main cast (season 4)
2017	Ghost Wars	Marilyn McGrath-Dufresne	Recurring role
2018	Altered Carbon	Miriam Bancroft	Main role (season 1)
2019	Hospital Show	Lisa	Web series
2021	Midnight Mass	Annie Flynn	Limited-run series
2022	Grey's Anatomy	Cora	1 episode

==== Video games ====
Year	Title	Role	Notes
2004	The Chronicles of Riddick: Escape from Butcher Bay	Shirah	Voice

=== Directing ===
Year	Title	Notes
2016	Motive	1 episode
2017	Ghost Wars	2 episodes
2019	The Murders	2 episodes
2019–20	The Order	4 episodes
2019–23	Heartland	7 episodes
2021–23	Nancy Drew	4 episodes
2025	When Calls the Heart	2 episodes
2025	Watson	1 episode
2026	Doc	1 episode
