= The Killing (American TV series) =

2011 American crime drama television series

- Genre: Crime drama; Mystery
- Based on: Forbrydelsen by Søren Sveistrup
- Developed by: Veena Sud
- Starring: Mireille Enos; Billy Campbell; Joel Kinnaman; and others
- Theme music composer: We Fell to Earth
- Composer: Frans Bak
- Country of origin: United States
- Original language: English
- No. of seasons: 4
- No. of episodes: 44 (list of episodes)

Production
- Executive producers: Veena Sud; Mikkel Bondesen; Søren Sveistrup; Piv Bernth; Ingolf Gabold; Dawn Prestwich; Nicole Yorkin
- Producers: Aaron Zelman; Jeremy Doner; Kristen Campo
- Production locations: Vancouver, British Columbia
- Running time: 42–59 minutes
- Production companies: Fox Television Studios; Fuse Entertainment; KMF Films; Fabrik Entertainment

Original release
- Network: AMC
- Release: April 3, 2011 – August 4, 2013
- Network: Netflix
- Release: August 1, 2014

The Killing is an American crime drama television series that premiered on April 3, 2011, on AMC, based on the Danish television series Forbrydelsen (literal translation The Crime but also widely known as The Killing internationally). The American version was developed by Veena Sud and produced by Fox Television Studios and Fuse Entertainment. Set in Seattle, Washington, the series follows the various murder investigations by homicide detectives Sarah Linden (Mireille Enos) and Stephen Holder (Joel Kinnaman).

AMC announced the series's cancellation in July 2012, but picked it up for a third season after a renegotiation with Fox Television Studios and Netflix. The Killing was again cancelled by AMC in September 2013, but Netflix announced in November 2013 that it had ordered a fourth season consisting of six episodes to conclude the series. The complete fourth season was released on Netflix on August 1, 2014.

== Cast ==
=== Main ===
Actor	Character	Seasons			
Actor	Character	1	2	3	4
Mireille Enos	Sarah Linden	Main	Main	Main	Main
Joel Kinnaman	Stephen Holder	Main	Main	Main	Main
Billy Campbell	Darren Richmond	Main	Main		Guest
Michelle Forbes	Mitch Larsen	Main	Main		
Brent Sexton	Stan Larsen	Main	Main		
Kristin Lehman	Gwen Eaton	Main	Main		
Eric Ladin	Jamie Wright	Main	Main		
Brendan Sexton III	Belko Royce	Main	Main		
Jamie Anne Allman	Terry Marek	Main	Main		
Annie Corley	Regi Darnell	Main	Recurring	Recurring	Guest
Liam James	Jack Linden	Recurring	Main	Guest	Main
Elias Koteas	James Skinner			Main	
Hugh Dillon	Francis Becker			Main	
Amy Seimetz	Danette Leeds			Main	Guest
Bex Taylor-Klaus	Bullet			Main	
Julia Sarah Stone	Lyric			Main	
Max Fowler	Twitch			Main	
Peter Sarsgaard	Ray Seward			Main	
Gregg Henry	Carl Reddick			Recurring	Main
Tyler Ross	Kyle Stansbury				Main
Sterling Beaumon	Lincoln Knopf				Main
Levi Meaden	AJ Fielding				Main
Joan Allen	Margaret Rayne				Main

=== Recurring ===
- Evan Bird as Tom Larsen, Rosie's brother (season 1–2)
- Seth Isaac Johnson as Denny Larsen, Rosie's brother (season 1–2)
- Tom Butler as Lesley Adams, the mayor (season 1–2)
- Garry Chalk as Lt. Michael Oakes, the detectives' boss (season 1–2)
- Katie Findlay as Rosie Larsen, the teenage girl who was found dead (season 1–2)
- Brandon Jay McLaren as Bennet Ahmed, a teacher at Rosie's high school (season 1–2)
- Ashley Johnson as Amber Ahmed, Bennet Ahmed's wife (season 1–2)
- Callum Keith Rennie as Rick Felder, Sarah's fiancé (season 1–2)
- Kacey Rohl as Sterling Fitch, Rosie's best friend (season 1–2)
- Alan Dale as Senator Eaton, Gwen's father (season 1–2)
- Richard Harmon as Jasper Ames, Rosie's ex-boyfriend (season 1–2)
- Barclay Hope as Michael Ames, Jasper's father (seasons 1–2)
- Claudia Ferri as Nicole Jackson, the manager of the Wapi Eagle Casino (season 1–2)
- Don Thompson as Janek Kovarsky, a figure from Stan Larsen's shady past (season 1–2)
- Mark Moses as Lt. Erik Carlson, Linden's new boss at the police department (season 2)
- Brian Markinson as Gil Sloane, Holder's NA sponsor (season 2)
- Ben Cotton as Pastor Mike, director of Beacon House, the youth homeless shelter (season 3)
- Aaron Douglas as Evan Henderson, a death row prison guard (season 3)
- Nicholas Lea as Dale Daniel Shannon, a death row inmate (season 3)
- Jewel Staite as Caroline Swift, Holder's girlfriend and a District Attorney (season 3–4)
- Katherine Evans as Bethany Skinner, James Skinner's daughter (seasons 3–4)

== Series overview ==
Season	Episodes	Originally released		
Season	Episodes	First released	Last released	Network
1	13	April 3, 2011	June 19, 2011	AMC
2	13	April 1, 2012	June 17, 2012	AMC
3	12	June 2, 2013	August 4, 2013	AMC
4	6	August 1, 2014		Netflix

=== Season 1 (2011) ===
The first season covers the first two weeks of the investigation of the murder of local teenager Rosie Larsen and has three main storylines: the police investigation into Rosie's murder, the Larsen family's attempts to deal with their grief, and the fluctuating electoral fortunes of a political campaign that becomes embroiled in the case.

=== Season 2 (2012) ===
The season resumes the investigation into the murder and reveals secrets about the Larsen family as well as a possible conspiracy within the campaign race and the Seattle police department. The Larsen murder case gets closed with the discovery of those involved in it.

=== Season 3 (2013) ===
A year after the Rosie Larsen case, Stephen Holder searches for a runaway girl and uncovers a string of murders connected to one of Sarah Linden's previous murder investigations. Linden, no longer a detective, must return to both a career and a case she had put behind her.

=== Season 4 (2014) ===
The fourth season features detectives Sarah Linden and Stephen Holder handling the fallout of their actions from the previous season while investigating the murder of a family whose only survivor is a member of an all-boys military academy.

== Production ==
The pilot was ordered by AMC in January 2010 and then was picked up for a full series order in August 2010. The series is filmed in Vancouver, British Columbia, with some scenes in season two filmed in Coquitlam, British Columbia, at Riverview Hospital. Production began on the pilot episode on December 2, 2010. The pilot is written by series creator and executive producer Veena Sud and is directed by Patty Jenkins.

In contrast to the original Danish series, executive producer Veena Sud explained, "We're creating our own world. We are using the Danish series as a blueprint, but we are kind of diverging and creating our own world, our world of suspects and, potentially, ultimately who killed Rosie Larsen." Sud describes the series as "slow-burn storytelling in a sense that every moment that we don't have to prettify or gloss over or make something necessarily easy to digest, that we're able to go to all sorts of places that are honest, and dark, and beautiful and tragic, in a way that is how a story should be told."

=== First cancellation and revival ===
AMC announced on July 27, 2012, that the series would not be renewed for a third season. However, Fox Television Studios announced that they were attempting to shop the show to other networks. In August 2012, it was revealed that Fox Television Studios was in talks with both DirecTV and Netflix in an attempt to revive the series. In November 2012, it was confirmed that Fox Television Studios was in final negotiations with Netflix to continue the series for a third season. AMC, which had originally canceled the show, was also included in the deal, which would gain the network the privilege of airing the new episodes before being hosted by Netflix, in return for sharing any associated production costs with Netflix. Variety reported on November 30, 2012, that the show would be returning to AMC, planning for a May 2013 debut, with production set to begin months before that. Cast members Mireille Enos and Joel Kinnaman were confirmed to return, with Veena Sud as showrunner and returning writers including executive producers Dawn Prestwich and Nicole Yorkin. On December 12, 2012, it was confirmed that cast members Billy Campbell, Michelle Forbes, and Brent Sexton would not return for the third season.

On January 15, 2013, AMC and Fox Television Studios announced that the series had been renewed for a 12-episode third season. Production started on February 25, 2013, in Vancouver, British Columbia, and ended on June 25, 2013.

=== Second cancellation and revival ===
AMC ultimately canceled the series after the third season in September 2013. However, in November 2013, two months after its cancellation, Netflix announced it had picked up The Killing for a fourth and final season consisting of six episodes. Cast members Mireille Enos and Joel Kinnaman returned, with Veena Sud as showrunner, and executive producers Dawn Prestwich and Nicole Yorkin returning as writers.

== Reception ==
=== Critical response ===
Reviewers and fans of the first three seasons noted similarities and borrowed elements from David Lynch's TV series Twin Peaks and the follow-up film Twin Peaks: Fire Walk with Me, and compared and contrasted Sud and Lynch's works.

==== Season 1 ====
The series premiere was praised by most critics. Metacritic gave it a score of 84/100 based on reviews from 29 critics, indicating "universal acclaim". Rotten Tomatoes gave it a 94% approval rating with an average rating of 8.5/10, based on 36 critic reviews; the website's critics consensus reads, "The Killing is a slow burning mystery with an eerie, multi-dimensional story propelled by thoughtful writing, believable characters, and realistic horror, even if its season finale was unsatisfying."

Tim Goodman of The Hollywood Reporter gave the series a very positive review, calling it "excellent, absorbing and addictive. When each episode ends, you long for the next—a hallmark of great dramas." Goodman also praised Mireille Enos's performance as the lead character Sarah, saying, "It's not until you watch Enos play Sarah for a while that it sinks in—there hasn't been a female American character like her probably ever."

Entertainment Weekly's Ken Tucker gave it a B+, saying, "The acting is strikingly good" and that "[s]ome viewers may find The Killing a little too cold and deliberate, but give it time. Its intensity builds steadily, giving the series unexpected power." Alex Strachan of The Vancouver Sun said the series "is soaked in atmosphere and steeped in the stark realism of Scandinavian crime novelists Henning Mankell and Stieg Larsson" and that it "is not as much about a young girl's murder as it is a psychological study of what happens afterward, how a tight-knit community tries to recover and how a dead child's mother, father and siblings learn to deal with their pain in their own private ways". Matt Roush of TV Guide applauded the series, calling the acting "tremendous" and saying that he "was instantly hooked by the moody atmosphere of this season-long murder mystery set in Seattle". He went on to say, "What really stands out for me, in this age of cookie-cutter procedurals, is how The Killing dramatizes the devastation a violent death has on a family, a community, on the people involved in the investigation. Nothing about this show is routine."

Subsequent episodes were met with lesser praise by some critics, criticizing the show's reliance upon increasingly implausible red herrings to drive each episode and the withholding of details about each character's background, especially Rosie's, thus making them difficult to relate to or empathize with.

The first-season finale was met with negative reviews from some critics. The Los Angeles Times called it "one of the most frustrating finales in TV history", with Alan Sepinwall of HitFix.com calling the end "insulting". Finally, Maureen Ryan of AOL TV said that the finale "killed off any interest I had in ever watching the show again". "[The show] began last spring looking like the smartest, most stylish pilot in years", complained Heather Havrilevsky in The New York Times Magazine. "Fast-forward to the finale, in which we learn that what we've been watching is actually a 26-hour-long episode of Law & Order, and we're only halfway through it."

==== Season 2 ====
The early seasonal episodes received generally favorable reviews from critics, with Metacritic giving it a score of 68/100 based on reviews from 23 critics. Rotten Tomatoes gave it a 67% approval rating with an average rating of 7.0/10, based on 30 critic reviews; the website's critics consensus reads, "The Killing's second season feels a bit tedious and unsure of where it wants to go, but it succeeds in keeping the audience on its toes, thanks to consistently fantastic acting and some strategic storytelling."

Lori Rackl of the Chicago Sun-Times stated: "Few television shows are as addictive as this pensive, wonderfully paced suspenser." The Washington Post''s Hank Stuever stated: "My own enjoyment of The Killing begins and ends with the gloom so brilliantly conveyed by its pace and performances." Brian Lowry of Variety stated the series remained "compelling", adding that "the writers... are adept at overcoming the stodgy pace by dangling tantalizing clues near each hour's end, creating a strong pull to see what transpires next." HitFix's Alan Sepinwall compared this season to the first and called it "better". He added: "The performances are still good, and now the characterization is a bit better. When you add that to the fine atmosphere... and you view the mystery itself as a kind of necessary evil that allows you to see the parts of the show that do work, then it's not bad."

The season finale, "What I Know," received mixed reviews. Sepinwall stated: "I'd like to say that season 2 of The Killing was an improvement on season 1, and in some ways, it probably was. The second season certainly did a better job of doing what Veena Sud claimed to be doing last year, in that it took advantage of the extra time to sketch in some of the characters... I honestly feel like any kinder feelings I have for the second season came from the complete lack of investment I had in it." Sean McKenna of TV Fanatic rated the finale 4.7 out of 5 stars, but, upon first viewing, "wasn't sure what to feel. I wasn't elated. I wasn't excited" but after watching it again was "sucked into the world, mesmerized not by the victory of our hero cops... but by the gut-wrenching moments that unfolded". CraveOnline's William Bibbiani called the finale "an odd duck". After citing Jamie's early revelation as "melodramatic silliness", Bibbiani added: "The rest of the episode gets its job done, with one major, glaring flaw. The characters end up more or less where they need to be, but some nearly ridiculous loose ends remain." Brandon Nowalk of The A.V. Club rated this finale a C−, calling it "so unconvincing", adding "I couldn't believe how little all this resolution affected me after The Killing so thrillingly took my grudging engagement for a ride a few weeks ago. This is the same show that delivered Richmond’s hospital nightmare, the hunt for Holder, the anti-Western standoff 'Sayonara, Hiawatha', and the crazy train of the last two weeks? No, this is the full-circle episode, the one that takes the show back to its roots. Wah wah."

==== Season 3 ====
Rotten Tomatoes gave it a 67% approval rating with an average rating of 7.3/10, based on 30 critic reviews; the website's critics consensus reads, "Though The Killing's third season doesn't do anything much differently than before, it continues to benefit from strong acting, and new viewers should be able to jump right in with ease." On Metacritic, the season has a score of 69/100 based on 22 reviews, indicating "generally favorable" reviews.

==== Season 4 ====
Rotten Tomatoes gave it a 47% approval rating with an average rating of 6.5/10, based on 19 critic reviews; the website's critics consensus reads, "While its characters still intrigue and its atmosphere remains absorbingly dark, The Killing succumbs to silliness in its fourth season, straying into distractingly overwrought territory." On Metacritic, the season has a score of 53/100 based on 13 reviews, indicating "mixed or average" reviews.

=== Ratings ===
When it premiered, the pilot was AMC's second-highest original series premiere, following The Walking Dead. The premiere drew 2.7 million viewers and a 2 household rating. The two encores of the premiere episode brought the ratings of the premiere up to a total of 4.6 million total viewers and a 3.7 household rating. The UK premiere on Channel 4 brought in 2.2 million viewers. In the second season, the viewership and ratings dipped to a series low 1.59 million viewers and 0.6 rating with adults aged 18–49.

=== Awards and nominations ===
Awards and nominations for The Killing
Year	Association	Category	Nominated work	Result
2011	1st Critics' Choice Television Awards	Best Drama Series	The Killing	Nominated
2011	1st Critics' Choice Television Awards	Best Actress in a Drama Series	Mireille Enos	Nominated
2011	1st Critics' Choice Television Awards	Best Supporting Actress in a Drama Series	Michelle Forbes	Nominated
2011	63rd Primetime Emmy Awards	Outstanding Lead Actress in a Drama Series	Mireille Enos	Nominated
2011	63rd Primetime Emmy Awards	Outstanding Supporting Actress in a Drama Series	Michelle Forbes	Nominated
2011	63rd Primetime Emmy Awards	Outstanding Directing for a Drama Series	Patty Jenkins (Episode: "Pilot")	Nominated
2011	63rd Primetime Emmy Awards	Outstanding Writing for a Drama Series	Veena Sud (Episode: "Pilot")	Nominated
2011	63rd Primetime Emmy Awards	Outstanding Single-Camera Picture Editing for a Drama Series	Elizabeth Kling (Episode: "Pilot")	Nominated
2011	63rd Primetime Emmy Awards	Outstanding Casting for a Drama Series	The Killing	Nominated
2012	38th Saturn Awards	Best Television Presentation	The Killing	Nominated
2012	38th Saturn Awards	Best Actress in Television	Mireille Enos	Nominated
2012	38th Saturn Awards	Best Supporting Actor in Television	Joel Kinnaman	Nominated
2012	38th Saturn Awards	Best Supporting Actress in Television	Michelle Forbes	Won
2012	64th Writers Guild of America Awards	Best New Series	The Killing	Nominated
2012	69th Golden Globe Awards	Best Actress – TV Series Drama	Mireille Enos	Nominated
2012	64th Directors Guild of America Awards	Outstanding Directorial Achievement in Dramatic Series	Patty Jenkins	Won
2013	39th Saturn Awards	Best Syndicated Cable Television Series	The Killing	Nominated
2013	39th Saturn Awards	Best Actress in Television	Mireille Enos	Nominated
2013	34th Young Artist Awards	Best Performance in a TV Series – Supporting Young Actor	Seth Isaac Johnson	Nominated
2013	2nd Annual Social TV Awards	Best Drama Social TV	The Killing Story Sync	Nominated
2014	4th Critics' Choice Television Awards	Best Supporting Actor in a Drama Series	Peter Sarsgaard	Nominated

== Distribution ==
In March 2013, Netflix closed negotiations with Fox Television Studios with a deal to be the exclusive subscription service for the series' third season. Netflix streamed the season approximately three months after its finale. It already provided the first two seasons. In November 2013, Netflix announced it picked up the series for a fourth and final season after AMC had canceled it. By July 2018, it was reported that the first three seasons would be removed from Netflix on August 1, 2018. However, all four seasons were removed from the service in several countries on that date, with only Australia and New Zealand still hosting the complete series and Japan hosting the fourth season.

As of January 2019, the complete series is streaming in the United States on both Hulu and Amazon Prime Video, with none of the seasons hosted on Netflix.

== Online promotion ==
Season-one promotion on AMC's The Killing website included "Rosie's Room", a virtual simulation of murder victim Rosie Larsen's bedroom that users could explore in order to learn more about Rosie's life and search for secrets and clues that could help lead to the discovery of who is responsible for her untimely death. Users could peek inside Rosie's dresser, look under her bed, listen to her answering machine messages, flip through her vinyl record collection, and explore her laptop computer to access her social networking profile, vlogs, photos, and emails. Season-one promotion also included an interactive application called the "Suspect Tracker" whereby users could vote each week for who they think is the prime suspect in the murder investigation and discuss their theories about the case and its suspects with other fans. A personality quiz titled "How Would You Be Cast in a Crime Thriller?" telling users what part they would be cast in on The Killing based on their reactions to various crime-related situations was also released prior to season one. AMC's The Killing website also featured exclusive sneak-peek and behind-the-scenes videos, trivia games, numerous photo galleries, episode and character guides, a blog, and a community forum.

For season two's promotion, AMC's The Killing website added the "Rosie Larsen Interactive Case File," which gave a glimpse into the suspects, evidence, crime scene photographs, and documents related to the case.
