= Stand down =

Stand down means to go off duty or relax from a state of readiness, particularly in a military situation.

Stand down may also refer to:

- Irish Stand Down, a form of bare-knuckle boxing
- "Stand Down", a 2013 song by Little Mix from Salute

== See also ==
- "Stand Down, Margaret", a song by Elvis Costello and the Attractions on the 1983 album Punch the Clock
- Stand Down Soldier, a 2014 film directed by Jeryl Prescott
- "Whine & Grine/Stand Down Margaret", a song by The Beat from the 1980 album I Just Can't Stop It
- Operation Stand Down, an event featuring resources for homeless American military veterans
