= Mosaic Youth Theatre of Detroit =

Non-profit organisation in the USA

- Established: 1992
- Founder: Rick Sperling
- Type: 501(c)(3)
- Location: Detroit, MI
- Services: Youth arts
- Fields: Acting, singing, technical production
- Website: https://mosaicdetroit.org/

Mosaic Youth Theatre of Detroit is a youth development 501(c)(3) non-profit organization in Detroit, Michigan with a mission to empower young people through professional performing arts training and the creation of first-rate theatrical and musical art. The Detroit Free Press called the organization "one of the region's cultural gems."

Mosaic's youth artists have performed at the White House, the Kennedy Center, Carnegie Hall, Apollo Theatre, The Public Theater, the Redford Theatre, for President Barack Obama, and have toured productions in Europe, Asia, Africa and 30 states throughout the U.S.

== History ==
The organization and program was founded in 1992 by Rick Sperling partly in reaction to the elimination of arts programs in public schools. The program has worked to alleviate gaps in arts education.

Within a report of the program by University of Michigan educational researchers in 2008, Rick Sperling wrote:

"I founded Mosaic Youth Theatre of Detroit fifteen years ago based on the incredible artistic potential I saw in young Detroiters. While working as an artist-in-residence in the Detroit Public Schools, I saw great need and I also saw a great opportunity. The need I observed was for advanced-level theatre and music training at a time when budget cuts had led to the elimination of most school-based arts programs. The opportunity I saw was to create a world-class youth arts organization based on the incredible talent of young people throughout Detroit." -Founder Rick Sperling in 2008

== Program ==
Mosaic specializes in artistic studies for youth in acting, singing, and technical production work. Offered programs usually include several performance ensembles, technical apprenticeships, sponsored competition for playwrights, school residencies, in-school, afterschool, summer camp, and internships. The Mosaic Model aims to provide opportunities for positive youth development through performance arts training. National and international touring performances also work to bring recognition to Detroit as a center for arts and culture and promote a positive image of metro Detroit area youth.

Educational researchers from the University of Michigan studied Mosaic as a program model and published a report in 2008 funded by The Wallace Foundation.

Sub-programs and events include the recurring New Voices: Detroit Festival which involves a showcase of original plays and songs by Detroit teenagers and a multi-week program in which young participants are paired with experienced professional playwrights and composers as mentors.

=== Performances/Productions ===
Students and adult artistic directors often collaborate to adapt and re-write existing classic works to new settings. The following is a partial list of known youth productions that have received media coverage.

- Mary Shelley's Frankenstein in an industrial minimalist style
- "Robin Hood" in a futuristic Detroit
- Julius Caesar re-written to a Detroit high school setting
- A Christmas Carol
- “Lift Every Voice”
- "Hastings Street"

== Notable alumni ==
- Celia Keenan-Bolger: Broadway actress, 3-time Tony Award nominee
- Malaya Watson: 8th place on American Idol (season 13)
- Diarra Kilpatrick: actress and writer/producer, known for Diarra from Detroit (2024-present), American Koko (2015 web series and 2017 ABCd streaming production), and The Salton Sea (2016).
- Eryn Allen Kane
- Angela Birchett
- Ryan Destiny

== See also ==
- Satori Theatre Company of Detroit: A Detroit youth theater active in the 1970s
