= Diarra Kilpatrick =

American actress

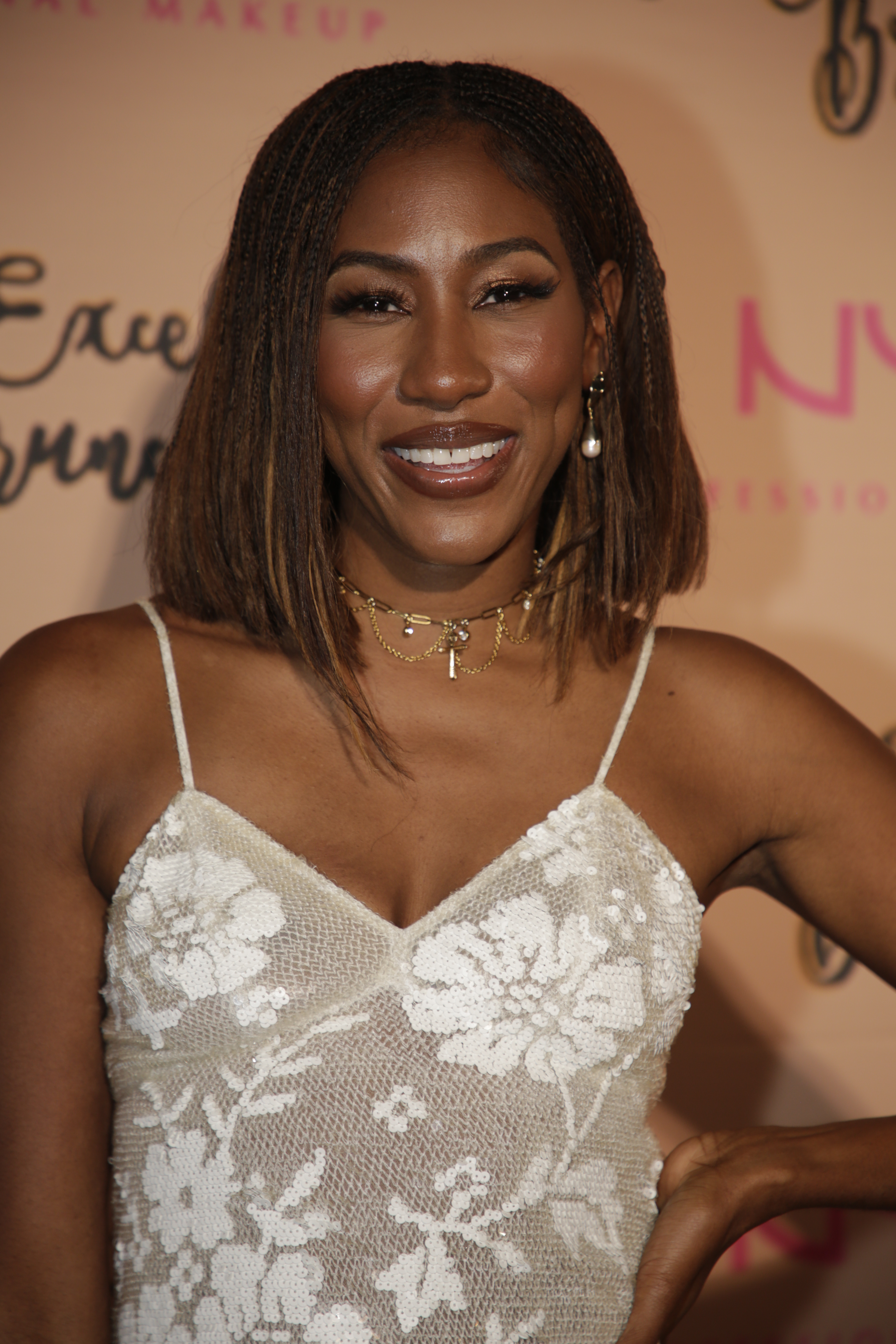
- Kilpatrick at Black Excellence Brunch 2026.
- Born: 1983 or 1984 (age 42–43); Detroit, Michigan, U.S.
- Occupations: actress; writer; producer
- Years active: 2006–present
- Notable work: Diarra from Detroit, American Koko, The Salton Sea

Diarra Kilpatrick (born August 28, 1983) is an American actress, writer, and producer, who has received recognition and awards for work in theatre, TV, and film. She produced, wrote, and starred in two series including American Koko (2017) on ABC, for which she received a Primetime Emmy Award nomination, and the mystery comedy-drama series, Diarra from Detroit which has also received award nominations.

== Early life and education ==
Kilpatrick was born in 1983, and raised in Detroit in the Calumet Townhomes. She is the half-sister of Kwame Kilpatrick. Her mother Elise supported local arts and hosted artists at their home, and often took Kilpatrick to the Detroit Institute of Arts, the Detroit Public Library, the Children's Museum, and the Wayne State University art and performing arts building.

As a child she performed in productions at Meadow Brook Theater and at school. When she reached age eligibility at age 12, she joined the Mosaic Youth Theatre of Detroit after having been rejected as too young at age 10, and performed in The Piano Lesson and later an adaptation of Comedy of Errors. Kilpatrick attended Bates Academy for the gifted and talented, and later graduated from the Detroit Country Day School, where she had also acted. She earned her bachelor's degree at NYU Tisch.

== Career ==
=== Theatre ===
From roughly 2007 to 2015, Kilpatrick acted in Los Angeles theater productions and earned several awards and nominations for stage performances (see Awards). Her play credits during this time include Three Sisters After Chekhov, Gary Lennon's The Interlopers, The Royale, Closely Related Keys, and Tarell Alvin McCraney's In the Red and Brown Water for which she won an LA Weekly Theatre Award and an NAACP Theatre Award. The Hollywood Reporter called her performance luminous. Bob Verini in his review at Arts in LA said, "the stunning Diarra Kilpatrick's [character] Oya begins fresh-faced and ends shattered, yet her decline is so subtly etched we’re practically unaware of her falling apart until it’s too late." Tony Frankel at Stage and Cinema wrote, "it is Diarra Kilpatrick who will have you breathless as she vacillates from wide-eyed innocence to tragic self-realization. [...] Ms. Kilpatrick calls forth incorruptibility with such effortless grace that when rage suddenly emits from the [...] actress, it startles like a crime against nature."

=== Film ===
Kilpatrick's first film appearance was in the 2006 romantic drama Forbidden Fruits. She co-starred as a transgender woman in Jason Bushman's queer comedy-drama film Hollywood, je t'aime (2009). The Hollywood Reporter review by Stephen Farber called her performance adept. She appeared in the independent films H4 (2012), a modernized Shakespeare adaptation, and Jeryl Prescott's drama Stand Down Soldier (2014) which is about the family troubles of a PTSD-afflicted woman veteran. In 2015 she had a supporting role in the Viola Davis and Jennifer Lopez crime drama film Lila & Eve. In 2016, she starred as a nameless hitchhiker in the drama film The Salton Sea by Veena Sud, for which she received the Nordic International Film Festival award for best actress. She later starred in the television film revival of Nash Bridges (2021), a police procedural.

=== TV Acting, Writing, and Producing ===
Kilpatrick's first TV appearance was in an episode of House in 2008. She also guest-starred in The Game, Hart of Dixie, Mike & Molly, Southland, Major Crimes, and five appearances on Private Practice. She wrote and served as story editor for episodes of the comedy-drama I'm Dying Up Here The reception of Kilpatrick's web series American Koko (see below) helped her become a staff writer for the NBC police-procedural The Mysteries of Laura. She had a recurring role in the comedy series, The Last O.G. and wrote two episodes of the show.

She later starred in an episode of The Twilight Zone reboot in 2019. The Guardian said that her presence was so invigorating that it almost cured flaws in the script. In 2020 she was cast as Clara Drake in the HBO period drama series, Perry Mason.

Kilpatrick has created, written, produced, and starred in several projects for TV. In interview, she has explained the impulses behind her projects:

"In television or film, I was going out [i.e. auditioning] a lot for nurses, prostitutes and sassy friends. Every Black actress, and really every actor of color, has that story. I was just interested in doing something that saw a Black woman at the center that went on a journey with her."

==== Diarra from Detroit (2024-present) ====
In April 2023, she signed an overall deal with BET Studios. She created, produced and starred in Diarra from Detroit, a mystery comedy-drama series set in Detroit. The series received positive reviews from critics. The show, Kilpatrick's performance, the writing, and the director, earned various award nominations (see Awards below). NPR journalist Tonya Mosley, who is from Detroit, said about the show:

"This work is unlike anything I've ever seen. It's smart and funny while also interweaving some very serious topics, like the epidemic of missing Black children and the social and economic challenges of Detroit. [It also] tackles divorce and friendship and betrayal and police corruption. And did I mention that it's funny? [...] There is a lightness and also a depth that is rarely given to stories about the city. [Kilpatrick] really conveys community and a sense of place that I've never seen [on screen] about our hometown."" -Tonya Mosley of NPR

==== American Koko (2015 and 2017) ====
In 2015, she wrote, produced, and starred in a satirical web series, American Koko, on YouTube, and later produced a new version of the show for ABC's digital service ABCd in 2017. The original web series won the American Black Film Festival’s Best Web Series Award in 2015. Kilpatrick has said that the budget was $3,000, which was her tax return check. The web series was noticed by producer/actor Julius Tennon and his wife Viola Davis who picked it up for development at their production company, JuVee Productions. The new series was purchased by ABC. The original first season was re-shot and a second season was produced. Both seasons premiered online on ABC Digital on June 19, 2017.

The show follows Koko (played by Kilpatrick), who "is a Los Angeles race detective at the Everyone’s a Little Racist Agency (E.A.R), which has the daunting mandate of ending racism in America." The role earned her a nomination for the Primetime Emmy Award for Outstanding Actress in a Short Form Comedy or Drama Series.

"In post-post-racial America, problems of a distinctly racial nature are considered especially heinous. In Lost Angeles, these sticky racial situations are handled by an elite team of problem solvers. Agent Baldwin Bledsoe, our resident genius and social scientist. Lucky Ling, our eternal optimist. Milo Gold, like Batman his superpower is white privilege. And there's Akosua Miller, codename: Koko. Not only an employee, she was also once a client. She was cured of Type 1 Angry Black Woman Syndrome, the kind inherited from residual racial trauma. Working for the Everyone's a Little Racist Agency isn't just a job for Koko, it's a mission. This is her story." -Opening voice-over narrated by Viola Davis

==== The Climb (2017) ====
Kilpatrick wrote, produced, and starred in a pilot for Amazon Studios in fall 2017 titled The Climb, directed by Chris Robinson and co-produced with Christina Lee through the The Mark Gordon Company. It is a "Detroit-set comedy about an assistant who ditches her job to find internet fame" and is about the American Dream in a rapidly changing Detroit. The series was not picked up by Amazon.

Several reviewers praised Kilpatrick's work in the pilot when it was publicly aired on Amazon Prime. The Guardian's Stuart Heritage compared the pilot to Haters Back Off and also said, "The show is gorgeous to look at, bordering on high fashion at times, and it would undoubtedly land upon a better sense of itself if given a series. However, judging by the pilot alone, it has much less going for it than its competitors." Daniel Feinberg of The Hollywood Reporter compared it to SMILF and downplayed comparisons to Insecure while saying, "I don’t think The Climb is a great pilot, but I think star and creator Diarra Kilpatrick has a voice and a mindset that are worth supporting. [This pilot is like a] 27-minute short-film showcase reel that would, in a perfect world, be steered by a strong and nurturing network development team." Decider's Brett White compared it to Broad City and said, "Kilpatrick sells every aspect of this character, bringing a rich humanity to social media queens that are often dismissed as vapid."

== Personal life ==
Kilpatrick is married.

== Awards and nominations ==
- 2011 – Nominated, Ovation Awards, Lead Actress in a Play (for The Interlopers)
- 2012 - Nominated, NAACP Theatre Awards, Best Female Lead - Local (for The Interlopers)
- 2013 - Winner, LA Weekly Theatre Award, Leading Female Performance (for In the Red and Brown Water)
- 2013 - Winner, NAACP Theatre Award, Best Leading Actress in a Drama (for In the Red and Brown Water)
- 2013 – Nominated, Ovation Awards, Lead Actress in a Play (for In the Red and Brown Water)
- 2015 - Winner, American Black Film Festival, Best Web Original (for American Koko web series)
- 2015 - Nominated, NAACP Theatre Award, Best Lead Female - Local (for Closely Related Keys)
- 2016 - Winner, Nordic International Film Festival, Best Actress (for The Salton Sea)
- 2018 – Nominated, Primetime Emmy Award for Outstanding Actress in a Short Form Comedy or Drama Series (for American Koko)
- 2025 - Nominated, Independent Spirit Awards, Best Breakthrough Performance in a New Scripted Series (for Diarra from Detroit)
- 2025 - Nominated, Black Reel Awards, Outstanding Lead Performance in a Comedy Series (for Diarra from Detroit)
- 2025 - Nominated, NAACP Image Awards, Outstanding Writing in a Comedy Series and Outstanding Breakthrough Creative (Television) (for Diarra from Detroit)

== Filmography ==
=== As Actor ===
==== Film ====
| Year | Title | Role | Notes |
|---|---|---|---|
| 2006 | Forbidden Fruits | Lisa | |
| 2007 | Unfinished | Waitress | Short |
| 2008 | Keepin' the Faith: Higher Ground | Asia | |
| 2009 | All Americana | Steph | Short |
| 2009 | Gang Girl | Bess Roundtree | |
| 2009 | Hollywood, je t'aime | Kaleesha | |
| 2009 | Surrender | Bess Roundtree | Short |
| 2011 | Under-Tow | Shar | Short |
| 2011 | Talking with the Taxman About Poetry | Afton | |
| 2012 | H4 | Clarice | |
| 2014 | Stand Down Soldier | Billi | |
| 2014 | Four Women | Sarah | Short |
| 2015 | Lila & Eve | Maya | |
| 2015 | The Brink | Jane | Short |
| 2016 | The Salton Sea | The Hitchhiker | Nordic International Film Festival Award for Best Actress |
| 2020 | Baldwin Beauty | - | Short |
| 2021 | The Goldfish | Maya | Short |
| 2021 | 14 Days | Faitma | Short |

==== Television ====
| Year | Title | Role | Notes |
|---|---|---|---|
| 2008 | House | Sally | Episode: "The Itch" |
| 2008–2012 | Private Practice | Nurse Danielle | 5 episodes |
| 2009 | The Game | Groupie | Episode: "Take a Bow" |
| 2009 | The Young and the Restless | Young Maid | Episode: "Episode #1.9195" |
| 2010–2011 | Disaster Date | Herself | Recurring role (season 3); main role (season 4) |
| 2011 | Hart of Dixie | Mother | Episode: "Gumbo & Glory" |
| 2012 | Mike & Molly | Amira | Episode: "Surprise" |
| 2013 | Southland | Yvette | Episode: "Babel" |
| 2014 | American Koko | Akosua Miller | Youtube series, later re-produced with ABC in 2017 |
| 2017 | American Koko | Akosua Miller | Main role, producer, writer. Nominated - Primetime Emmy Award for Outstanding Actress in a Short Form Comedy or Drama Series |
| 2015 | Major Crimes | Peaches Williams | Episode: "The Jumping Off Point" |
| 2017 | The Climb | Nia | TV pilot |
| 2019 | The Twilight Zone | Didi Scott | Episode: "The Comedian" |
| 2019 | The Last O.G. | Lisa | Recurring role |
| 2020–2023 | Perry Mason | Clara Drake | Recurring role (season 1); main role (season 2) |
| 2021 | Nash Bridges | Lena Harris | Television film |
| 2024–present | Diarra from Detroit | Diarra Brickland | Lead role, also creator and producer Nominated — Black Reel Award for Outstanding Lead Performance, Comedy Series (2024); Nominated — Black Reel Award for Outstanding Comedy Series (2024) |

=== As Writer and Producer ===
| Year | Title | Role | | Note | Ref. |
| Year | Title | Writer | Producer | Note | Ref. |
|---|---|---|---|---|---|
| 2024 | Diarra from Detroit | Yes | Executive | Also creator and lead actor | |
| 2018 | The Last O.G. | Yes | No | | |
| 2018 | I'm Dying Up Here | Yes | No | Also story editor on 9 episodes | |
| 2017 | The Climb | Yes | No | TV Pilot | |
| 2017 | American Koko | Yes | Yes | Re-make by ABC | |
| 2014 | The Mysteries of Laura | Yes | No | Staff Writer | |
| 2015 | American Koko | Yes | Yes | Web series | |
