= Veena Sud =

Canadian television writer and producer

- Born: 1967 (age 58–59); Toronto, Ontario, Canada
- Education: Barnard College; New York University
- Occupations: Television writer, director, producer
- Children: 1

Veena Cabreros-Sud (pronounced "Sood") is a Canadian-born American television writer, director, and producer. She is best known for developing the American television drama series The Killing (2011–2014), which is based on the Danish series Forbrydelsen (The Crime).

== Early life and education ==
Sud was born in Toronto to Mohendra Sud, a physician born in India, and Jessica Cabreros, a nurse born and raised in the Philippines.

She grew up in Indian Hill, Ohio, a suburb near Cincinnati, Ohio. Sud graduated from Cincinnati Country Day School and attended Barnard College, where she studied political science and women's studies. She served as university senator.

After graduating from Barnard, she spent several years working as a journalist at Pacifica Radio and at the media-watchdog group Fairness and Accuracy in Reporting. When she was 28, she enrolled at New York University's film school and received a Master of Fine Arts degree from the Film and Television program.

== Career ==
After graduation, Sud directed MTV's The Real World before moving to Los Angeles, where she was hired as an episode writer for the short-lived 2002 television series Push, Nevada. Shortly afterwards, Sud was hired as a writer for the CBS police drama Cold Case. After three seasons, she was promoted to executive producer, a role she served for the show's fourth and fifth seasons.

Sud went on to develop The Killing, a crime drama based on a popular Danish series. Running from 2011 to 2014 and four seasons, the series earned her an Emmy nomination and a Writers Guild of America award nomination. Sud's 2016 film The Salton Sea earned co-star Diarra Kilpatrick a Nordic International Film Festival award for best actress.

In 2018, Sud developed the limited series Seven Seconds, a Netflix crime drama inspired by the Black Lives Matter movement, and starring Regina King. The same year, Regina King won the Emmy for lead actress in a limited series for her performance in Seven Seconds.

In 2020, Sud developed The Stranger, a Quibi horror web series about a rideshare driver who is terrorized by her sociopathic passenger.

Sud was formerly the marketing and distribution director for Third World Newsreel, which specializes in films by and about people of color.

== Filmography ==
- The Stranger (2020) (writer, director, executive producer)
- The Lie (2018) (writer, director)
- Seven Seconds (2018) (writer, executive producer)
- The Salton Sea (2016 film) (writer, director, producer)
- The Killing (2011–2014) (writer, executive producer)
- Cold Case (2003–2008) (writer, story editor, executive producer)
- Push, Nevada (2002) (episode writer)
- Sorority Life (2002) (season three director)
- The Real World (2001) (episode director)
- I Stop Writing The Poem (2000) (director)
- One Night (2000) (director)
- The Appointment (1999) (sound mixer)
- Stretchmark (1996) (writer, director, actress)

== Awards ==
=== One Night ===
- Won the San Francisco International Film Festival Certificate of Merit in Film & Video - Short Narrative

=== The Killing ===
- Nominated for Emmy Award for Outstanding Writing for a Drama Series
- Nominated for Writers Guild of America Award for New Series

=== Seven Seconds ===
- Won Black Reel Award for Outstanding Television Movie or Limited Series
- Won Black Reel Award for Outstanding Screenplay, TV Movie or Limited Series with Shalisha Francis
