= List of programs broadcast by ABC =

List of programs broadcast by ABC may refer to:

- List of programs broadcast by the American Broadcasting Company
- List of programs broadcast by ABC Television (Australian TV network)
