= List of ABC shows =

List of ABC shows may refer to:

- List of Australian Broadcasting Corporation programs
- List of programs broadcast by American Broadcasting Company
- List of programs broadcast by Associated Broadcasting Company
