= Jeryl Prescott =

American actress

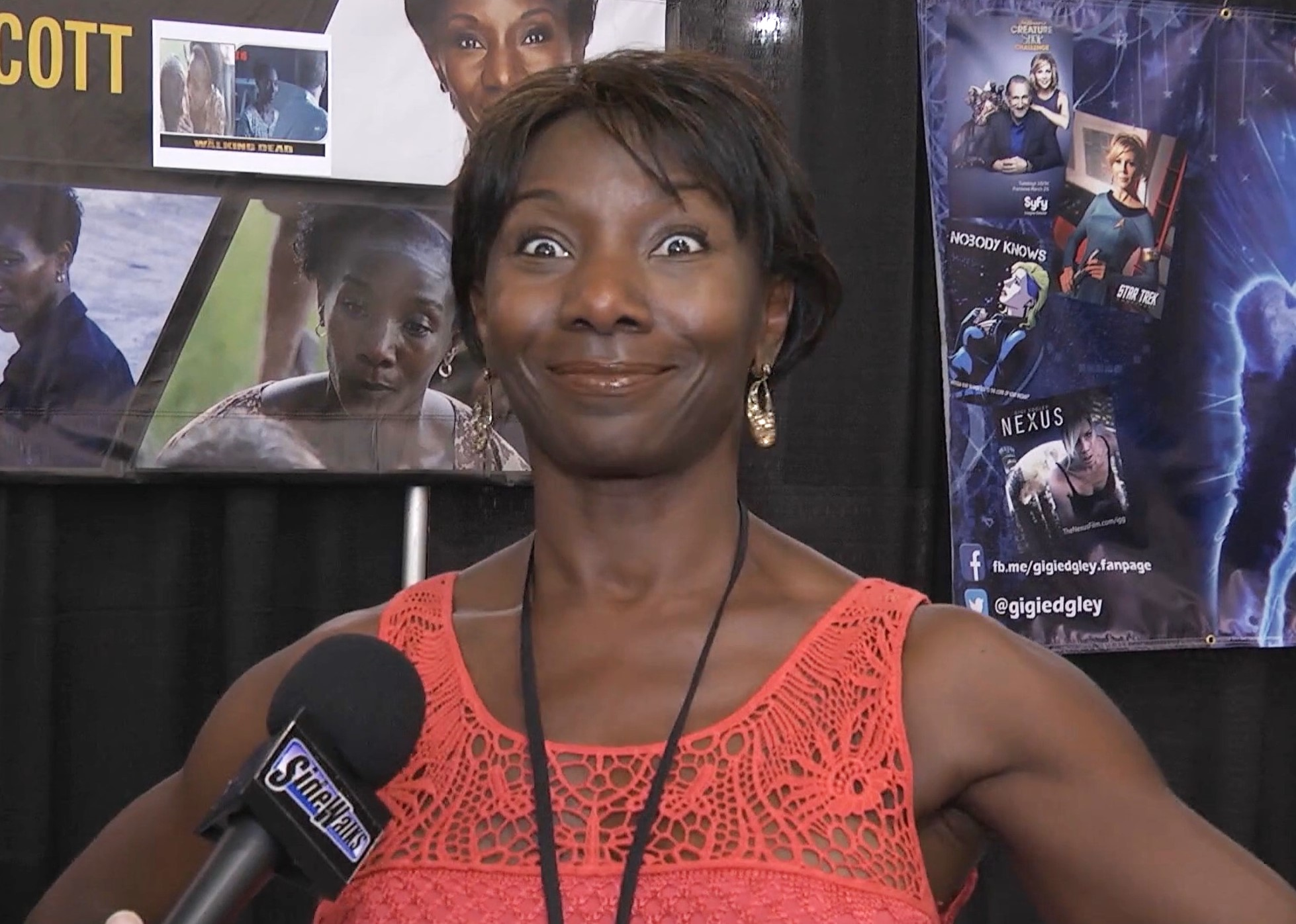
- Prescott interviewed in 2017
- Born: Hartsville, South Carolina, U.S.
- Other name: Jeryl Prescott Sales
- Years active: 2002–present
- Children: 2

Jeryl Prescott Gallien (also known as Jeryl Prescott Sales) is an American actress, best known for her roles as Jacqui in The Walking Dead (2010–2012; 2016), Madame Xanadu in Swamp Thing (2019), and Aktropaw in Ahsoka (2023). She also wrote, directed, and starred in Stand Down Soldier (2015), a drama film about a PTSD-afflicted woman veteran attempting to re-integrate.

== Life and Academics ==
Jeryl Prescott was born Hartsville, South Carolina. Prescott's mother was highly active in local community service and care-taking At a young age, Prescott and her mother worked for a local group called Willing Workers, a local community organization. She is a resident of Winston-Salem, North Carolina and divides her time between that city and Los Angeles.

In or around the 1990's, Prescott earned a Bachelor's degree in Industrial Management, and worked as a trucker. She earned her PhD in American Literature, and has a Master's Degree in African American Literature. She worked as a professor and administrator at Wake Forest University in 1998. In 2000 as Dean, she organized a pluralism program that included a film festival. Around this time she acted in local stage productions. She has also taught at the North Carolina School of the Arts. As "Jeryl J. Prescott" she has published scholarly journal articles on the topics of Ernest Hemingway, Toni Morrison, and women's studies.

Prescott has said her performance experience started with growing up in the church, where she was always performing in front of people.

“I grew up in the church, where I was always performing. That was my initiation into performing and being comfortable in front of people.”

— Jeryl Prescott on the start of her acting experience

Prescott has advocated for research and awareness of sarcoidosis, a disease that disproportionately affects African American women and which has no known cure. She was given a Spotlight Award by the Foundation of Sarcoidosis Research for her advocacy of FSR's Ignore No More: African American Women & Sarcoidosis National Campaign. She has said, "I’m speaking out because I care about my community. [...] These rare diseases run in the family and the more we know, the better we can prevent and treat these diseases and maybe avoid some of the more severe consequences.”

== Career in TV and film ==
=== TV ===
Prescott portrayed Jacqui in Season 1 of the television series The Walking Dead, which premiered on AMC in 2010. Prescott was originally cast for just two episodes of the premiere season of The Walking Dead. However, her character, Jacqui, was then written into the series cast of the season as well. Prescott reprises her role as Jacqui in the Season 3 episode "Hounded", as one of the voices that speaks to Rick on the phone.

Prescott had a recurring role as Cherry during the second season of Ray Donovan in 2014 on Showtime, and in 2015 as Golden 2015 in the comic book adaptation series Powers. She also guest-starred on Brothers & Sisters, Southland, Parks and Recreation and Revolution.

Prescott recurred as Judge Delilah Nunes in Criminal Minds: Suspect Behavior on CBS in 2011, as Judge Martha Ross in the 2021 BET+ drama series, All the Queen's Men, and as Judge Caldwell in General Hospital in 2024. She guest-starred as a navy admiral in an episode of Scandal in 2017. In single-episode appearances, she played a medical examiner in Criminal Minds in 2008, a medical examiner in Game of Silence in 2016, a nurse in Hawthorne (2009), and a nurse in Castle (2013).

In 2017, Prescott guest-starred in the racial comedy American Koko with Diarra Kilpatrick. (They had previously worked together on Prescott's film Stand Down Soldier (2014) and in H4.) Prescott plays a mother of a young daughter who has been cast as Harriet Tubman in an in-school musical production, but dilemma arises because the daughter sings terribly. Prescott guest starred as a veteran on NCIS: Los Angeles, and guest starred in an episode of Rebel in 2017. She also appeared in two episodes of HBO drama series, Big Little Lies in 2019, and in Shameless, and guest-starred on 9-1-1, Batwoman and Nancy Drew.

In 2019, she was cast in her first series regular role, on the DC Universe series Swamp Thing playing the role of Madame Xanadu. The series was canceled after one season.

=== Film ===
Prescott appeared as Felicite in Bolden! (2011), a drama about the life of the New Orleans ragtime and jazz musician Buddy Bolden. In 2012 she appeared in H4, a modernized Shakespeare adaptation produced by Harry Lennix, based on a combination of William Shakespeare's Henry IV, Part 1 and part 2. She played a school principal in the TV film Rx in 2009, and an assistant principal in Get a Job, shot in 2012. She also has appeared in The Birth of a Nation (2016) and in West of Hell, a horror western, in 2018. She co-starred in High Flying Bird (2019), a drama about a basketball agent directed by Steven Soderbergh.

In 2021 she appeared in the Netflix romantic comedy film Resort to Love. In 2023, she appeared in the romantic drama film, To Live and Die and Live.

==== Stand Down Soldier (2015) ====
“My desire with the film is to make people aware that these women sacrificed so much and that their sacrifices aren’t over when their active duty ends. When one soldier is deployed, a whole community is affected.”

— Prescott on Stand Down Soldier

In 2015, Prescott directed, wrote, and played the lead role in, the drama film Stand Down Soldier which is about the psychiatric and family troubles of a PTSD-afflicted woman veteran. She has said that the story came from her personal familiarity with family members and women around her who had served in the military and who had problems re-integrating with civilian life after deployment, combined with other reports that she had read of service, bravery, trauma, sexual abuse within the military, and family disruption. Prescott interviewed women soldiers in South Carolina as preparation and collaborated with a psychologist. Due to a low budget, Prescott "called in favors" from friends who worked for lower pay than usual, and also used IndieGoGo. Prescott's husband, Leander Sales, who is an experienced editor, edited the film.

Reviewers in Highbrow Magazine and The Chicago Crusader wrote that it was revelatory and refreshing to see a film about a soldier’s return home and the toll of war that was about a woman, but one of the reviewers wished that it had spent less time on subplots. The film was distributed by ArtMattan Films and Urban Movie Channel, and had its New York premier at the 2015 African Diaspora International Film Festival and was reportedly screened at other events including the GI Film Festival.

== Filmography ==
=== Film ===
| Year | Title | Role | Notes |
|---|---|---|---|
| 2002 | Max | Miss Kurtz | Short film |
| 2003 | The Epicureans | Tina Williams | |
| 2005 | The Skeleton Key | Mama Cecile | |
| 2006 | Red Autumn | Jasmine | Short film |
| 2008 | Vacancy 2: The First Cut | Deputy | |
| 2009 | The Life I Meant to Live | Narvis | |
| 2009 | Rx | Principal Simmons | Television film |
| 2011 | Under-Tow | Angela | |
| 2012 | The Wedding | Madame Secretary | Short |
| 2012 | H4 | Northumberland | Sometimes credited as Jeryl Sayles |
| 2013 | Get a Job | Assistant Principal | |
| 2015 | The Cold Descent | Desdemona Lark | |
| 2015 | Stand Down Soldier | Stacy Armstrong | Also director, writer and producer |
| 2015 | Conflict of Interest | Mrs. Simmons | |
| 2016 | The Birth of a Nation | Janice | |
| 2018 | Dead Women Walking | Sarah | |
| 2018 | West of Hell | Desdemona Lark | |
| 2018 | Her Only Choice | Denise | |
| 2018 | Persephone: Pictures at the End of the World | Dr. Rodgers | |
| 2019 | High Flying Bird | Emera Umber | |
| 2019 | Bolden | Felicite Lamennais | |
| 2020 | Unpregnant | Peg | |
| 2021 | Resort to Love | Naomi King | |
| 2023 | To Live and Die and Live | Ummi | |
| 2023 | Deadly DILF | Kendra | |
| 2023 | A Haitian Wedding | | |

=== Television ===
| Year | Title | Role | Notes |
|---|---|---|---|
| 2006 | Surface | Receptionist | 1 episode |
| 2006 | One Tree Hill | Counselor | Episode: "Nothing Left to Say But Goodbye" |
| 2008 | Criminal Minds | Medical Examiner | Episode: "In Heat" |
| 2009 | Hawthorne | Nursing Attendant | Episode: "Yielding" |
| 2010 | Brothers & Sisters | Waitress | 1 episode |
| 2010; 2012, 2016 | The Walking Dead | Jacqui | Season 1 (recurring, 5 episodes); Season 3 (guest star, 1 episode) Season 7 (archive footage, 1 episode) |
| 2011 | Southland | Nina Brown | Episode: "Cop or Not" |
| 2011 | Criminal Minds: Suspect Behavior | Judge Delilah Nunes | Episode: "The Time Is Now" |
| 2011 | Parks and Recreation | Bank Teller | Episode: "End of the World" |
| 2013 | Revolution | Rosie | Episode: "The Song Remains the Same" |
| 2013 | Castle | Nurse | Episode: "The Fast and the Furriest" |
| 2014 | Eagleheart | Angry Onlooker | Episode: "Honch" |
| 2014 | Modern Family | Shopper | Episode: "The Wedding, Part 1" |
| 2014 | Gang Related | Brenda Plemmons | Episode: "Pecados del Padre" |
| 2014 | Ray Donovan | Cherry | 5 episodes |
| 2015 | Powers | Golden | 4 episodes |
| 2015 | Battle Creek | Tracey | Episode: "Heirlooms" |
| 2015 | Kingmakers | Lorraine Bradley | ABC pilot |
| 2016 | Game of Silence | Coroner | Episode: "Pilot" |
| 2017 | NCIS: Los Angeles | Barbara | Episode: "Battle Scars" |
| 2017 | Rebel | Ms. Biden | Episode: "Redemption" |
| 2017 | American Koko | Syreena | 3 episodes |
| 2017 | Scandal | Admiral Bregoli | Episode: "Watch Me" |
| 2018 | Shameless | Gabarieo | Episode: "A Gallagher Pedicure" |
| 2018 | NCIS | Annie Sullivan | Episode: "A Thousand Words" |
| 2019 | Swamp Thing | Madame Xanadu | Series regular 10 episodes |
| 2019 | Big Little Lies | Cecilia | Episodes: "Tell-Tale Hearts" and "She Knows" |
| 2019; 2024 | 9-1-1 | Tina Washington | 2 episodes |
| 2020 | Cherish the Day | Elegant Woman | Episode: "Genesis" |
| 2020 | Batwoman | Sophie Moore's mother | Episode: "Grinning From Ear to Ear" |
| 2020; 2021 | Nancy Drew | Millicent "Millie" Nickerson, Edith Nickerson | 2 episodes |
| 2021-2023 | All the Queen's Men | Judge Martha Ross | 11 episodes |
| 2023 | The Good Doctor | Elaine | Episode: "Second Chances and Past Regrets" |
| 2023 | Ahsoka | Aktropaw | 3 episodes |
| 2024 | General Hospital | Judge Caldwell | 3 episodes in May |
| 2024 | S.W.A.T. | Judy Kincaid | Episode: "Vanished" |
