= Diarra from Detroit =

- Genre: Comedy-drama; Mystery
- Created by: Diarra Kilpatrick
- Starring: Diarra Kilpatrick; Morris Chestnut; DomiNque Perry; Claudia Logan; Bryan Terrell Clark; Shannon Wallace; Jon Chaffin; Phylicia Rashad
- Country of origin: United States
- Original language: English
- No. of seasons: 2
- No. of episodes: 16

Production
- Executive producers: Diarra Kilpatrick; Kenya Barris; Miles Orion Feldsott
- Camera setup: Single-camera
- Production companies: BET Studios; Khalabo Ink Society; Maple Lodge

Original release
- Network: BET+
- Release: March 21 – April 25, 2024
- Network: Paramount+
- Release: July 29, 2026 – present

Diarra from Detroit is an American mystery dark comedy drama television series created by Diarra Kilpatrick and executive produced by Kilpatrick and Kenya Barris. The series stars Kilpatrick as a divorced schoolteacher who believes that she has been ghosted by her rebound Tinder date. Her search for the missing man pulls her into an old mystery involving the Detroit underworld.

The series premiered at the 2023 Tribeca Film Festival on June 14, 2023. It premiered on March 21, 2024, on BET+ to positive reviews from critics. In April 2025, the series was renewed for a second season, which premieres on July 29, 2026 on Paramount+, following BET+'s shutdown the prior June.

== Plot ==
In season 1, Diarra goes on a date with Chris (Shannon Wallace) who disappears afterward. Diarra's investigation to find him connects to a decades-old missing child case of Deonte Brooks, and to various local crime organizations that are in conflict. Diarra obtains the assistance of Vonda (Phylicia Rashad), the mother of Deonte. She also deals with an acrimonious divorce with ex-spouse "Swa" (Morris Chestnut).

In season 2, Chris re-unites with his family, but he is soon jailed as a suspect in a triple murder that he didn't commit. Diarra leads an investigation to find the true killer and thereby free Chris, while also investigating a landlord's missing "armoire" (actually a desk) which is part of an elaborate mystery dating to the Prohibition Era. Diarra's circle of friends and investigators now includes Chris's cousin Mac (Chris Powell) and her cousin Raqueeba (Shoniqua Shandai), and she renews a relationship with ex-boyfriend Royce (Method Man). The case brings her to an undercover initiation into the freemasons and to secrets at an Underground Railroad site beneath the Detroit Trinity Rose Baptist Church. She comes into conflict with various groups seeking the same mystery and treasure, including a local underworld figure (Bokeem Woodbine), the Detroit Preservation Council, and a white-supremacist militia. Diarra has also learned that "The Chief", the arch-criminal responsible for events in Season 1, is Walter Harley (Harry Lennix), a powerful businessman and crime lord. Harley threatens the lives and livelihoods of Diarra's friends if she reveals his actions.

== Cast and characters ==
=== Main ===
- Diarra Kilpatrick as Diarra Brickland.
  She works as a school teacher and gets into private investigation when a man she is dating disappears. Due to her recent divorce with Swa, she takes control of their 1970 Chevelle and uses it through the series.
- Morris Chestnut as François "Swa" Brickland
  Diarra's ex-husband and a successful lawyer. While having an acrimonious relationship with Diarra, he attempts to use his connections to keep her safe as she becomes entangled with local criminal groups.
- DomiNque Perry as Aja
  Diarra's friend. Her religious celibacy conflicts with her strong romantic attraction to Keyshawn. She is an aspiring businessperson and begins to have dealings with Walter Harley, a powerful developer.
- Claudia Logan as Moni (Season 1)
  Diarra's childhood best friend. She is married to Roman.
- Bryan Terrell Clark as Mr. Tea
  A gay friend and co-worker of Diarra. He has a frustrated and ambivalent relationship with a romantic partner, DJ Jerrell. He wants to kick Jerrell out of his house, but can't commit to doing it, partly because Jerrell cooks him delicious food and has an undeniably positive effect on Tea's life.
- Shannon Wallace as Chris
  He dates Diarra for a short time before being abducted and disappearing. Diarra nicknames him "Ambien" in her narration, because their short romance together cured her insomnia. Although he disappears in the first episode, Diarra experiences imaginary visions of him where he gives her comfort and advice.
- Jon Chaffin as "Danger"
  A long-time friend and neighbor of Diarra. The show depicts occasional brief telepathic communication between Diarra and Danger. His voice sometimes sounds like he has something caught in his throat, which Diarra later realizes is psychosomatic.
- Phylicia Rashad as Vonda Brooks
  The mother of Deonte Brooks who was abducted at the mall 30 years ago during a moment of inattention. Rashad has said about the character, "here is a woman who is complex and complicated, whose personal history isn’t necessarily ideal. She is wanting to make amends. She is wanting to make something of her life that will somehow balance the terrible misstep."
  - Christina Gordon as young Vonda

=== Recurring ===
- Chris Powell (Season 2) as Mac. A family member of Chris and member of Diarra's investigatory group. Powell is also a writer on the series.
- Shoniqua Shandai as Raqueeba (Season 2), Diarra's cousin
- Glynn Turman as Ron. Diarra's landlord who hires her to find his precious missing heirloom "armoire" (actually a desk) for a reward of 3 month's rent.
- David Zayas as Marshall, a ragged ex-detective who originally investigated the Deonte Brooks case but was run out of the police force because of his persistent work against corruption and organized crime.
  - Julio Macias as Young Marshall
- Method Man as Royce (Season 2), a previous romantic partner of Diarra and now her ally
- Joe Lorenzo as Detective Holstein, a police officer who somewhat helps Diarra with information and warnings.
- Jude Demorest as Bailey, a Homeward Farms member who has a relationship with Danger
- Harry Lennix as Walter Harley, an influential developer and noted businessman
- Kinyumba Mutakabbir as Keyshawn, a football player and romantic interest of Aja
- Warren Egypt Franklin as DJ Jerrell. Jerrell is temporarily living as a "hobosexual" with Mr. Tea and has various excuses for why he can't go home. Diarra needs Tea to be friendly toward Jerrell because he could potentially ruin Diarra's alibi in a police investigation.
- Paul Ben-Victor as Zervas (Season 1), the leader of the local Greek mob
- Bechir Sylvain as Roman, the husband of Moni
- John Salley as Tony Kincaid. An underworld figure whom Diarra attempts to pressure for information in an ill-advised poker game.
- Icewear Vezzo as Leroy
- T.L. Flint as Spider
- Teéa Loreál as Nia

=== Guest ===
- Nicco Annan as an ex-boyfriend of Mr. Tea. He gives shelter to Diarra and friends during a manhunt for them in the streets. He critically psycho-analyzes Mr. Tea when they bicker about past grievances.
- Lil Rel Howery as Film School (Season 2), a small-time filmmaker who was held captive at the "Vultures" bar by Cartier Kelly and is freed by Diarra
- Kash Doll as Maisha, an enforcer for Tony
- Bill Duke as a freemason leader. He accepts Diarra and Aja when they disguise themselves as men for a fake initiation as part of a scheme.
- Bokeem Woodbine as Cartier Kelly (Season 2), a local crime lord and bar-owner. He took over a local bar, "Vultures", by single-handedly killing the gang of nazis who had previously occupied it.

== Development ==
Executive producer Kenya Barris and Kilpatrick had met at awards shows and film festivals and had intended to work together, but scheduling hadn't allowed it. After Barris joined BET+ he invited writers to do overall deals, called Kilpatrick to ask her to join, and accepted her pitch for the show after a meeting. Kilpatrick has said that “the [elevator] pitch was ‘Sex and the City’ crash-lands into ‘Chinatown’ and drop the whole thing in chocolate." BET's streaming division offered a script-to-series deal, meaning they would skip a pilot production process.

Kilpatrick has said that development was a fairly painless process and well-timed and that she did not have to fight for the show to exist in the context of her being "darker than a paper bag" and over 35. Although she knew the offered deal was equal to what more established creators had been offered, Kilpatrick still had the inclination to pitch to many more studios because she was used to "fighting for every crumb."

I always wait for the sound effect. Oh, yeah. I'm from Detroit. “Oof, ooh.” OK. I always wanted to share my version of Detroit with the world because [...] the gems of Detroit have far outweighed some of the more challenging aspects of growing up there. [...] We all know people who have done questionable things or are products of systemic racism or their circumstances or whatever, and that doesn't mean that we write them off in our community. We still see them as individuals deserving of grace and forgiveness and all the things.

— Kilpatrick on her vision of humanity in Detroit

Kilpatrick has discussed the sentiments behind the show in interviews with NPR and Vulture. The story of the character Deonte Brooks was partly based on the real case of the missing child D'Wan Sims. Other inspirations for the show include having watched many murder mystery shows like Murder, She Wrote, Matlock, Perry Mason, and Columbo with her grandmother as a child, and situations of crimes and foibles that had affected family members and friends. For example, Kilpatrick's mother was once robbed, recognized one of the robbers as the son of a friend, and later had the robber help her find the stolen items that he had ditched, a situation partly re-recreated in the show. In another real-life example partly re-created in the show, Kilpatrick's grandmother ventured into a crackhouse to retrieve a stolen television in order to watch her shows on time. Kilpatrick has also explained that she had an idyllic childhood in Detroit despite widespread notions of the city as decaying and dangerous.

=== Casting ===
Guest star Phylicia Rashad has said that the writing was a large reason why she joined the show. "I hadn't met Diarra, but when I read the script, my thought was that whoever wrote this is really clever and onto something." Kilpatrick acknowledged the broad fame of the Clair Huxtable role in the public mind, but as a theater actor herself associated Rashad with versatile performances on stage. Co-star Morris Chestnut similarly said that when he first read the script, he knew it was something that was truly different.

Co-star Bryan Terrell Clark said that when viewers feel the chemistry on screen, it’s because Kilpatrick cast a group of people that "actually get along and care about each other.” Before joining the series, many of the cast knew one another through the industry or had worked together.

A part had been written by Kilpatrick with actor Colman Domingo in mind for the role, but the assumption was that he would be too expensive and he was never contacted. On learning about this, Domingo explained that the show is one of his favorites and stated publicly that he would have gladly worked "for scale" meaning a minimal guild rate.

== Production ==
On March 21, 2023, it was announced that BET+ ordered eight-episode straight-to-series project Diarra from Detroit created by Diarra Kilpatrick. The series was produced by BET Studios and Khalabo Ink Society. By June, Morris Chestnut, DomiNque Perry, Claudia Logan, Bryan Terrell Clark, Phylicia Rashad, Shannon Wallace and Jon Chaffin had joined the main cast.

Principal photography began in February 2023 in Secaucus, New Jersey and Moonachie, New Jersey and benefitted from tax credits there. Variety wrote that the show "uses New Jersey as a stand-in for the Midwestern city, [but] the settings and costuming are so perfectly crafted that viewers would never know the difference." The costume designers are Paige Geran and Anitra Michelle. Season 2 shot in Atlanta which has attempted to attract productions.

On April 28, 2025, BET+ renewed the series for a second season, which premieres on July 29, 2026 on Paramount+, following BET+'s shutdown the prior June.

== Reception ==
=== Critical response ===
On Rotten Tomatoes, it has a rating of 100% based on 13 reviews. Reviewers have praised the writing, performances, Kilpatrick's persona, the ensemble chemistry, the tone, the comedy, and the sense of place in the setting, while qualified criticism has focussed on the plot complexity.

Aramide Tinubu from Variety gave it a positive review and wrote: "[it] might have been a hodgepodge of confusion in less capable hands. However, Kilpatrick and her writers execute the dramedy flawlessly. […] Unlike anything seen on television in recent years. [...] A spectacularly paced whodunit, especially as Diarra pulls her reluctant friends into her fatigue-fueled shenanigans. Refreshing, captivating and unapologetically Black." John Powers of NPR said, the show is "at once a mystery, a romcom, a vision of women's power, a portrait of Black Detroit and a cornucopia of good jokes" and that it has "some of the liberating, gleefully obscene craziness of an early Almodovar film."

NPR journalist Tonya Mosley, who is from Detroit, said about the show, "This work is unlike anything I've ever seen. It's smart and funny while also interweaving some very serious topics, like the epidemic of missing Black children and the social and economic challenges of Detroit. [It also] tackles divorce and friendship and betrayal and police corruption. [...] There is a lightness and a depth that is rarely given to stories about the city. [Kilpatrick] really conveys community and a sense of place that I've never seen [on screen] about our hometown." Melanie McFarland at Salon wrote, "Diarra [the character] is knowable yet not conventionally categorizable. [...] Diarra From Detroit conveys a sense of place, community, and legitimate lightness infrequently (if ever) portrayed about Detroit, a city condemned by entertainment and media coverage as a tragic, violence-plagued lost cause." She also said Kilpatrick's work is wonderful and bracingly funny.

Judy Berman at Time wrote, "The mystery is intriguing, but the show’s real draw are hilarious scripts delivered by a wonderful cast. [...] Kilpatrick’s noirish narration, pithy one-liners, and endearingly over-the-top presence tie it all together, making her one of TV’s freshest and funniest auteurs. Mark Peikert at IndieWire wrote that "[this] comedic mystery noir is a smorgasbord of delights, all filtered through the singular vision of its creator." Peikert said that the writers are thrillingly unafraid of letting Diarra be egregiously wrong, and that another thrill is "the almost tactile look of the show, all deep hues and moody lighting. This isn’t rain-slicked L.A. streets noir; this is Detroit winter noir, and the difference is invigorating."

Angie Han from The Hollywood Reporter called it part noir-infused mystery and part midlife-crisis comedy, and said it's "a sparkling showcase for creator-star Diarra Kilpatrick [...] who is a delight to watch — plucky, playful, a little bit loopy. [...] it brushes up against sincere pain. [But] subplots [with friends] feel like distractions from the main arc." Alan Sepinwall of Rolling Stone wrote, "Diarra is among this year's most pleasant TV surprises. The labyrinthine plot is where the series is weakest, though that’s more a hallmark of the genre than [a] failing of [the] show. Diarra Kilpatrick has more than earned a chance to spread her wings."

Nandini Balial at RogerEbert.com praised the writing and performances, and said the hair, make-up, and costume design was exceptional. She wrote, "the characters have nuanced backstories, hysterical antics, and whip-smart insults that don’t feel forced, just accurate and clever. [...] The bond between the cast is profound; [...] they tease, support, and simply exist with each other [with ease]." She noted that the show contains unnecessary subplots and side characters. Taryn Finely at Ebony wrote, "Balancing the character’s deep inner life with a world seeped in both danger and silliness is what makes this show one of the freshest and original series currently out."

Nina Metz of the Chicago Tribune compared the show's specific sense of place to Atlanta and South Side, and wrote "it has tremendous style from the start — sardonic, knowing and self-deprecating. [Diarra's] dazzling wardrobe gives the show an extra visual kick. [...] Blundering, R-rated Nancy Drew-meets-Scooby-Doo misadventures [...].” Metz also said the central resolution may not be satisfying, but the story “is as entertaining and absorbing as they come."

=== Accolades ===
Award	Year	Category	Nominee(s)	Result	Ref.
Black Reel Awards	2024	Outstanding Comedy Series	Diarra from Detroit	Nominated	
Black Reel Awards	2024	Outstanding Lead Performance in a Comedy Series	Diarra Kilpatrick	Nominated	
Black Reel Awards	2024	Outstanding Directing in a Comedy Series	Chioke Nassor	Nominated	
Black Reel Awards	2024	Outstanding Guest Performance in a Comedy Series	Phylicia Rashad	Won	
Independent Spirit Awards	2025	Best Breakthrough Performance in a New Scripted Series	Diarra Kilpatrick	Nominated	
Independent Spirit Awards	2025	Best New Scripted Series	Diarra from Detroit	Nominated	
NAACP Image Awards	2025	Outstanding Writing in a Comedy Series	Diarra Kilpatrick	Nominated	
NAACP Image Awards	2025	Outstanding Breakthrough Creative (Television)	Diarra Kilpatrick	Nominated	

== Themes ==
Taryn Finley at Ebony wrote that in Season 2, Diarra uses "ancestor veneration" to crack the case and that the scenario "cleverly maps out the interconnected significance of Black institutions and traditions: the church, oral histories and secret societies [...] as a reminder of why they’re worth fighting for."

Tonya Mosley at NPR said that a hallmark of the series, and other works by Kilpatrick, is the humanization of people not usually portrayed with any complexity, including strippers and gang members. She said that the depiction makes them "funny and vulnerable and basically human beings, even in the worst scenarios."

Nandini Balial wrote that the show is a "crash course in Detroit history" and conveys an array of city information including its connection to the Underground Railroad, the Prohibition Era, Motown, and urban design.

== Episodes ==
Season	Episodes	Originally released		
Season	Episodes	First released	Last released	Network
1	8	March 21, 2024	April 25, 2024	BET+
2	8	July 29, 2026	September 9, 2026	Paramount+

=== Season 1 (2024) ===
No. overall	No. in season	Title	Directed by	Written by	Original release date
1	1	"Chasing Ghosts"	Chioke Nassor	Diarra Kilpatrick	March 21, 2024
Diarra goes on a date with Chris and they have great chemistry, but he disappears afterward. Diarra re-traces his steps to discover what happened to him, and finds a naked Russian man tied up on the floor of a room. At a post office, Diarra sees a missing child poster for Deonte Brooks who disappeared 30 years earlier. A bystander comments to Diarra that Deonte's mother seemed suspicious. The poster's age-progression image shows that he would look like Chris as an adult. An omniscient flashback shows that Chris was attacked and abducted.
2	2	"The Russian"	Chioke Nassor	Diarra Kilpatrick	March 21, 2024
The police fail to help when Diarra brings them the missing person case. Diarra recognizes that Chris has been abducted twice, once as Deonte as a child and now again as an adult. Diarra goes to a nightclub with The Russian (Ilia Volok), and they have a playful evening of conversation on drugs while Diarra has an "exploration of self." In a moment of deductive clarity, Diarra asserts that he is lying about who he is. He attacks her, threatens her with a gun, and asks where Deonte is. The Russian is shot by a mysterious masked gunman, which has the effect of rescuing Diarra. Diarra flees the scene in a car with her friends.
3	3	"The One That Got Away"	Brennan Shroff	Diarra Kilpatrick & Mark Ganek	March 21, 2024
Using a burner phone that she took from The Russian, Diarra speaks to Vonda Brookes (Phylicia Rashad), the mother of child Deonte Brooks who went missing 30 years earlier during a moment of inattention. Diarra and Moni haphazardly join Vonda as she goes about ominous suspicious activities around town. It is eventually revealed that Vonda's activities are part of a personal mission to rescue abducted and endangered children so that no parents suffer the same fate that she did. Diarra's friend Aja, who is pursuing a career as a business person, becomes mentored by Walter Harley (Harry Lennix) a powerful developer.
4	4	"All In"	Brennan Shroff	Diarra Kilpatrick & Jacob Copithorne	March 28, 2024
Diarra and her friends connect Chris's disappearance and events in the case to a symbolic icon of a spider that seems related to an underworld crime group. Diarra has a vengeful public conversation with her ex-husband Swa (Morris Chestnut) in a restaurant, and they argue about divorce arrangements. Diarra schemes her way into a high-stakes poker game with Tony Kincaid (John Salley) in order to confront him for information about the Deonte / Chris case. She is terrible at poker and loses the game, and has no money to pay her bets. Tony's enforcer Maisha (Kash Doll) is about to maim her as punishment, but Tony relents when he misconstrues Diarra as a gambling addict. Diarra receives imaginary advice and companionship from visions of Chris.
5	5	"Snapshots of a Rendezvous"	Sadé Clacken Joseph	Doug Hall & Lisa McQuillan	April 4, 2024
Diarra has an emotional breakdown with Aja because of recent strain. Detective Holstein questions Diarra about the dead Russian, and Diarra attempts to throw him off the trail. Diarra is surveilled by multiple separate parties including Marshall (David Zayas), and Tank (Eric Clinton), who is himself surveilled by Zervas (Paul Ben-Victor). She converses with Danger (Jon Chaffin), her childhood friend and neighbor who is associated with a criminal underworld group. A camera within Chris's box of belongings leads Diarra and Moni to think he may have been involved in blackmail. Moni questions a photo shop owner (Willie C. Carpenter) for clues. Diarra and Moni have a confusing rendezvous with a mysterious underworld figure Goldie (Chantal Jean-Pierre) who they know had a connection with Chris, but they have to flee for their lives from Goldie's henchmen. Marshall appears and helps them escape. He explains that he pursued the Deonte case years earlier. Zervas murders Tank with an excavator.
6	6	"Fishbones"	Sadé Clacken Joseph	Esa Lewis & Helen Krieger	April 11, 2024
Under the false pretense of a griot oral history documentary, Diarra and Moni interview a group of legendary former strippers, Cinnamon, Rolexxx, and Ebony (Dequina Moore, Delissa Reynolds, Zakiya Young) who may have alibi confirmations about suspects in Deonte's/Chris's disappearance 30 years ago. Diarra learns that Deonte's abduction might have been extortion against the leader of an industrial labor strike. Clues lead her to investigate and confront Zervas, the Greek mob boss. During a conversation at his restaurant, he is assassinated by poisoning. Diarra attempts to leave the scene and is grabbed by an unseen person and shoved into a car trunk as police cars swarm the location.
7	7	"A Course In Miracles"	America Young	Teleplay by : Diarra Kilpatrick & Miles Orion Feldsott; Story by : Diarra Kilpatrick & Miles Orion Feldsott & Ester Lou Weithers	April 18, 2024
The person who took Diarra from the scene of Zervas's assassination is revealed to be her brother Aaron (Kevin Tre'von Patterson), who was told by Swa that Diarra was getting into danger. During a night of social re-unification with her friends at home, a crucial item in the case, a cassette tape that is being hunted by multiple gangs, is stolen by someone in Diarra's group during a power outage. Gunmen attack the house but are fought off by Swa and urged to leave by Danger, who knows them personally. Diarra discovers that Danger was secretly coerced into working for Velvet (Portia), an underworld crime leader connected to the case. Mr. Tea is accidentally shot and injured. Danger explains to Diarra his life-long guilt over having acted as a child accomplice to the abductors of Deonte. Diarra realizes that Danger's phlegmy-sounding voice is a psychosomatic manifestation of guilt. Danger insists that he saw Deonte's dead body being buried.
8	8	"The House On Blaine"	America Young	Miles Orion Feldsott & Ester Lou Weithers	April 25, 2024
Diarra rekindles a romance with Swa. Diarra and Danger examine the place in the woods where Danger insists he saw Deonte buried. They warm the frozen soil with a fire to attempt an exhumation. Diarra theorizes that Flora (Judeline Charles) intercepted the original kidnapping. Diarra painfully opens a buried bag and finds a teddy bear, which was used to fake Deonte's burial. She deduces that Velvet deceived Danger so that he couldn't attest to Deonte being alive, as the arch-criminal "The Chief" had ordered Deonte killed. Diarra and Moni reconnoitre's Velvet's headquarters. Diarra sneaks in to find Chris while Moni waits with the getaway car. A violent shoot-out between gangs occurs. Diarra is about to be murdered by Velvet, but Roman (Bechir Sylvain) rescues her by killing Velvet. Diarra finds Chris locked in a shed. Diarra, Chris, and her friends speed away in her car and celebrate in relief over having survived the ordeal and having found Deonte Brooks (who is Chris).

=== Season 2 (2026) ===
No. overall	No. in season	Title	Directed by	Written by	Original release date
9	1	"Welcome Home Deonte"	Chioke Nassor	Diarra Kilpatrick & Miles Orion Feldsott	July 29, 2026
At a large family cookout at Vonda's, Chris is alienated from family members because he grew up without ever knowing them. He is given a gun as a gift. Diarra learns that influential developer Harley (Harry Lennix) is not only the over-arching figure responsible for the plot of Season 1, but also the father of Deonte / Chris. Harley threatens the livelihoods and lives of Diarra's friends if she reveals his crimes.
10	2	"Mr. & Mrs. Ambien"	Chioke Nassor	Diarra Kilpatrick & Ester Lou	July 29, 2026
With Chris, Diarra investigates her landlord Ron's (Glynn Turman) precious missing heirloom "armoire" (actually a desk) for a reward of 3 month's rent. They ask questions at a pawn shop. An employee, Lisa (Lovie Simone) calls her boyfriend Booker (Dave Z. Martin) to warn him that two suspicious people are asking about the armoire. Later, Booker and a partner violently attack Chris and Diarra, and steal Chris's gun. In tense argument, Booker disagrees that the armoire ever belonged to Ron. Unbeknownst to Diarra at the time, but as told by Diarra's retroactive narration, Booker's inheritance is supposedly locked inside the armoire. Diarra tracks the armoire to a prom party being held by Lisa's family. She infiltrates the party with her friends. Diarra finds an upset high school student (Darielle Stewart) in a prom dress sitting on the armoire and comforts her. A man (Vic Plajas) violently attacks Diarra when he finds her with the armoire. Chris attacks the man, and he and Diarra escape. Clues lead them to an abandoned Coney restaurant where they find that Chris's gun has been used in a triple murder.
11	3	"The Initiated"	Brennan Shroff	Ariana Jackson & Chris Powell	August 5, 2026
Chris is wrongly held responsible for the triple murder and put in jail. Diarra is interrogated by police, but she is freed by legal threats from Swa and the intervention of Holstein (Joe Lorenzo). Diarra and friends find clues in a museum-like exhibit about a legendary figure from the 1930's Prohibition Era. Diarra deduces that Booker had also obtained clues from the exhibit. With the help of her ex-boyfriend Royce (Method Man), Diarra and Aja disguise themselves as men and go undercover as initiates into the freemasons. The freemason leader (Bill Duke) accepts them. Diarra steals a secret key. Later, Diarra and Aja are almost killed by a car bomb explosion. In a separate side-plot, it is revealed that Danger was left nearly-dead in the woods after being shot during events in Season 1. His incapacitated body is found by rural white men who put him in a pick-up truck. He is shown living a new life with a farmer-like commune "Homeland Farms" in Blair, Michigan, and has been nursed back to health by Bailey (Jude Demorest).
12	4	"Michigan Jones and the Brightmoor Adventure"	Brennan Shroff	Miles Orion Feldsott & Chris 'CP' Powell	August 12, 2026
Diarra's investigation leads to a Black biker bar, "Vultures", owned by Cartier Kelly (Bokeem Woodbine) who single-handedly killed a gang of nazis who previously occupied it. While searching Kelly's office, Diarra finds a chained-up filmmaker, Film School (Lil Rel Howery). Diarra frees him and escapes with her friends in the middle of a gang war shoot-out that erupts in the street. They evade a manhunt by taking refuge with Mr. Tea's ex-boyfriend Xavier (Nicco Annan) and his elder (Robert Yatta) and hair-braider Pandora (Chauntae Pink). Afterward, they go back to Vultures to further investigate. They use the secret key to open a secret passage. It becomes clear that Kelly is not responsible for the car bomb, nor for the triple murder, and also that the case involves a treasure that may be worth $100,000,000.
13	5	"The Escape Artist"	Sadé Clacken Joseph	Diarra Kilpatrick & Miles Orion Feldsott	August 19, 2026
A clue from Cartier Kelly's bar leads Diarra and friends to the basement of the Detroit Trinity Rose Baptist Church, which served as a stop on the Underground Railroad. They scheme to break-in to a secret passage but are foiled by a comically vigilant tour guide (Linda Boston) and other impediments. Diarra meets with Booker and establishes a shaky alliance because she needs his info that can free Chris from jail. He tells her that the killer in the triple murder was an "older woman" whose face he couldn't see, and that she whistles. He says that he has drone video of the murder, but he leaves Diarra's home in frustration without giving it to her. Moments later he is abducted on the street by white men with guns. Danger attempts to secretly leave the farmer commune, which he now knows deals meth to a dangerous militia. He is noticed by Bailey and other members and returns with them without revealing his plans.
14	6	"A Tale of Two Plays"	Sadé Clacken Joseph	Diarra Kilpatrick & Ester Lou	August 26, 2026
With Bailey's assistance, Danger investigates and photographs a militia weapons stockpile. Bailey tells him that she’s only working with the militia for one last job. Diarra infers that the president of the Detroit Preservation Council (Valarie Pettiford) was behind the triple murder. It becomes clear that Ron was coerced into working for her to find the armoire and treasure. Diarra and friends enact an elaborate plan to gain access to a secret passage under the church. They orchestrate an "inception" to make a talented gospel singer re-unite with the preacher, her ex-spouse, so that her singing will distract the congregation. Diarra and Royce go undercover as a fake couple, which genuinely rekindles their romance. Diarra and Mac open the secret passage, and a trap injures Mac. Ron confronts them. Diarra deduces that Ron killed the Council President. In a flashback, the Council President tortures Ron but he is able to stab her unexpectedly. The white militia arrives in the church basement and their leader (Deirdre Lovejoy) murders Ron and also whistles a half-hearted melody. Diarra recognizes that the militia leader was working with the Council President and flees into the catacombs while chased by militia gunmen.
15	7	"Guess Who's Coming to Dinner"	America Young	Miles Orion Feldsott & Ariana Jackson	September 2, 2026
Diarra meets with Booker's abductors to try to secure his release. The two abductors, who are militia members, show up alongside Danger and Bailey as a 4-person team. Diarra becomes angry that Danger never told her he was alive. The militia members are about to shoot Diarra, so Danger and Bailey kill them. Diarra, Danger, Tea, Aja, Bailey, and Booker, flee together in a car. At home and seemingly united in peace, the group is interrupted by Cartier Kelley who takes them hostage in exchange for information about the treasure, but they all have dinner together including Cartier. The militia leader arrives and reveals that she is a uniformed police officer and can therefore commit crimes with impunity. She has the advantage and extorts them for the treasure. When she says that she is the killer of Cartier's nephew, Cartier simply kills her. As a subject matter expert in criminal enterprises, Cartier helpfully advises the group that the strange clues surrounding Aja's mysterious situation with the stolen commercial shipment of hair extensions has the signs of a highly organized drug smuggling operation.
16	8	"A Cold Ass Wedding"	America Young	Diarra Kilpatrick & Miles Orion Feldsott	September 9, 2026
