= The Stranger (2020 American TV series) =

- Genre: Thriller; Mystery
- Created by: Veena Sud
- Written by: Veena Sud
- Directed by: Veena Sud
- Starring: Maika Monroe; Dane DeHaan; Avan Jogia; Roxana Brusso
- Composers: Bobby Krlic; James Kelly
- No. of seasons: 1
- No. of episodes: 13

Production
- Executive producer: Veena Sud
- Producer: Wileen Dragovan
- Cinematography: Paul Yee
- Production companies: KMF Films; Fox 21 Television Studios

Original release
- Network: Quibi
- Release: April 13 – April 27, 2020

The Stranger is an American crime thriller television series created by Veena Sud that debuted on Quibi on April 13, 2020.

Following the dissolution of Quibi on December 1, 2020, the series was streamed on The Roku Channel. It was announced later that the series would be reimagined as a feature film to be released on Hulu on April 15, 2024.

== Premise ==
A rideshare driver is thrown into her worst nightmare when a mysterious passenger enters her car. Her terrifying, heart-stopping ride with the stranger unfolds over 12 hours as she navigates LA in a chilling game of cat and mouse.

— Quibi

== Cast ==
- Maika Monroe as Clare
- Dane DeHaan as Carl E.
- Avan Jogia as J.J.
- Roxana Brusso as Captain Vasquez

== Episodes ==
No.	Title	Directed by	Written by	Original release date
1	"7:00 PM"	Veena Sud	Veena Sud	April 13, 2020
At night, rideshare driver Claire picks up her next passenger, Carl E., from a mansion in LA. Claire, who recently moved to LA from Wamego, Kansas, is unaware of the landscape in LA, causing her to take a longer route than normal. While driving, the pair decide to go on a date. When asked about the mansion, Carl reveals that he murdered the family inside 40 minutes before Claire picked him up. Having learned that Claire is an aspiring writer, Carl tells her that if she can tell him a good story, he won't kill her.
2	"8:00 PM"	Veena Sud	Veena Sud	April 13, 2020
3	"9:00 PM"	Veena Sud	Veena Sud	April 13, 2020
4	"10:00 PM"	Veena Sud	Veena Sud	April 14, 2020
5	"11:00 PM"	Veena Sud	Veena Sud	April 15, 2020
6	"12:00 AM"	Veena Sud	Veena Sud	April 16, 2020
7	"1:00 AM"	Veena Sud	Veena Sud	April 17, 2020
8	"2:00 AM"	Veena Sud	Veena Sud	April 20, 2020
9	"3:00 AM"	Veena Sud	Veena Sud	April 21, 2020
10	"4:00 AM"	Veena Sud	Veena Sud	April 22, 2020
11	"5:00 AM"	Veena Sud	Veena Sud	April 23, 2020
12	"6:00 AM"	Veena Sud	Veena Sud	April 24, 2020
13	"7:00 AM"	Veena Sud	Veena Sud	April 27, 2020
