= Sharing the Secret =

2000 American television drama film

- DVD cover (UK)
- Written by: Lauren Currier
- Directed by: Katt Shea
- Starring: Alison Lohman; Mare Winningham; Tim Matheson; Diane Ladd
- Music by: Danny B. Harvey
- Country of origin: United States
- Original language: English

Production
- Producers: Philip Kleinbart; Robert Greenwald
- Cinematography: Wally Pfister
- Editor: Deborah Zeitman
- Running time: 90 minutes
- Production companies: Nightstar Productions; Robert Greenwald Productions

Original release
- Network: CBS
- Release: May 10, 2000

Sharing the Secret is a 2000 American television drama film about a teenage girl's struggle with bulimia and its effect on her parents and friends. Originally airing on CBS television networks in the United States, the film has also aired on cable television's Lifetime Network. In 2001, the film received a Peabody Award for "an impressive, moving, and candid portrait of a teenager in crisis."

== Plot ==
By all outward appearances, teenager Beth Moss (Alison Lohman) has a good life. She is attractive, popular, and excels academically and at ballet. Beth, however, feels that she is not living up to expectations and is not in control of her life. Adjusting to her parents' divorce and trying to live up to their opposing compliments, Beth is afraid to grow up and at the same time struggles to fit in with her maturing friends. She turns to binging and purging as a means to gain control over at least one aspect of her life.

The first sign of any problem comes with a dizzy misstep during a ballet class. Beth begs her instructor (Irina Gasanova) not to tell her mother (Mare Winningham). In a later scene, Beth first hides a severe symptom (bleeding gums) from her friends, but then teaches one friend (Kady Cole) how to purge by inducing vomiting.

When playing a game with another friend, Sophia (Brighton Hertford), Beth cites her mother's complaints about the patients she sees in her child psychology practice as the cause of her greatest fear, which is to "not fit in ... in some way." She tells her friend that she does not want to be "like those people."

Throughout the film, Beth becomes adept at hiding her symptoms. After she passes out in her school hallway, she calls her step-mother (Mary Crosby) to pick her up from school to avoid telling her mother. At her father's (Tim Matheson) insistence, she sees a physician who diagnoses her as anemic. When the doctor asks if she has been eating, she says that she usually eats properly, but has not lately because she was sick. She then hides her scarred knuckles. When Beth's mother notices these Russell's signs later, Beth passes them off as old cat-scratches.

Upon Beth's return to school, her school counselor (Khadijah Karriem) confronts the girl with the observation that she may be bulimic. The school counselor is very sympathetic and attempts to get Beth to discuss her problems. Beth is forced to tell her mother, but insists that she no longer has a problem. This sets off a major conflict between the mother and daughter. Dr. Moss decides Beth must enter counseling. This conflict is paralleled in the film as Beth's grandmother (Diane Ladd) tries to console her daughter without really understanding her situation.

Another parallel is seen in one of Dr. Moss's patients, a little girl named Rachel (Camryn Grimes) who; like Beth, is feeling squeezed out by her father (Lawrence Monoson) and stepfamily. Beth hints at her resentment towards her stepmother, referring to her as a trophy wife. Beth begins counseling and is, at first, defiant, but begins to open up when her therapist (Roxana Brusso) explains her own history with anorexia.

Later, Beth is seen coming to terms with her disorder. A friend tries to cheer her up by telling her she is "skinny enough." Beth snaps at the girl saying she doesn't throw up to lose weight. She says, "I do it because I'm screwed up."

The conflict between Beth and her mother peaks when Beth comes home to find her mother in her bathroom, cleaning out her medicine cabinet in an effort to remove anything potentially useful to induce vomiting. Beth orders her mother out of the bathroom.

When her mother refuses, Beth proceeds to vomit into the toilet in plain view of her mother. Beth breaks down in tears, telling her mother that her hair is falling out and that her heart is beating rapidly. She asks to be checked into an inpatient facility. The film ends with Beth still in the hospital but telling her mother of signs of improvement such as after-meal supervision time being "down to two hours."

== Cast ==
- Alison Lohman: Beth Moss
- Mare Winningham: Dr. Nina Moss
- Lawrence Monoson: Phil Paige
- Mary Crosby: Irene
- Diane Ladd: Nina's Mother
- Tim Matheson: John Moss
- Camryn Grimes: Rachel
- Brighton Hertford: Sophia
- Kady Cole: Melanie
- Julius Ritter: Edward
- Irina Gasanova: Ballet Teacher
- Roxana Brusso: Keri Gold
- Khadijah Karriem: School Counselor

== Release ==
Sharing the Secret first aired on American CBS networks on May 10, 2000, and was released on Region 2 DVD in United Kingdom and Europe, distributed by Odyssey Video in 2003 and by Infinity Media from 2006 to present.

== Reception ==
The eating-disorder blog Disordered Times ranked the movie at five out of five, calling it "one of the best-made films on eating disorders ever," and saying that it "does not exaggerate for 'shock value,' nor does it portray eating disorders in a glamorous light..."
