= Take My Life...Please! =

- The Twilight Zone segment
- Episode no.: Season 1 Episode 22a
- Directed by: Gus Trikonis
- Written by: Gordon Mitchell
- Original air date: March 28, 1986

Guest appearances
- Tim Thomerson as Billy Diamond; Ray Buktenica as Max; Xander Berkeley as Dave; Jim McKrell as Marty

Episode chronology
← Previous "Red Snow"	Next → "Devil's Alphabet"

"Take My Life...Please!" is the first segment of the twenty-second episode of the first season of the American television series The Twilight Zone. In this segment, a recently deceased stand-up comedian must perform an act that will decide his fate in the afterlife.

== Plot ==
Billy Diamond, a top stand-up comedian, is driving away from a TV studio when he is ambushed by Dave, a struggling comedian armed with a pistol. Dave demands Billy give him money to make up for the fact that he stole one of Dave's routines and used it on a national talk show, making it unusable for Dave. Billy attempts to wrest the gun away, and the car crashes into a truck.

Billy finds himself in the backstage area of a nightclub. A man named Max explains that Billy is dead, Max is now his agent, and he must audition on stage to determine his eternal fate in the afterlife. Though still disoriented by his situation, Billy dives straight into his act. However, the audience remains silent through joke after joke, and demand he instead tell them about the time he beat up a prostitute during a drunken rage, how he stole Dave's material, and his mother's death from hypothermia after evicting her from his house, which he blames himself for. The audience laughs uproariously at Billy's shame-faced accounts of these incidents. As he leaves the stage at the end of the set, he tells Max that the on-stage confession has made him realize that he despises himself. Max says that because his act was a massive hit, he must continue to do it for two eons, repeatedly recounting the most shameful incidents of his life for the entertainment of the audience.

== Legacy ==
This segment provided the inspiration for the episode "The Comedian" in the 2019 Twilight Zone series.
