= Roxana Brusso =

Peruvian/American actress

- Born: Lima, Peru
- Occupation: Actress
- Years active: 1997–present

Roxana Brusso is a Peruvian/American actress. She is more known for her roles as Detective Alicia Fernández in Southland, and Sheri Strepling in Touch.

== Biography ==
Roxana Brusso was born in Lima, Peru with a Peruvian, Italian, and Spanish background. When she was four years old, her family moved to the United States, and she grew up in North Hollywood, California. She became interested in an acting career in college.

After that, she has appeared in several television series like Melrose Place, Beverly Hills 90210, Crossing Jordan, Without a Trace, ER, and NCIS, among others.

In 2007, she landed a recurring role as Maria on the short lived ABC series Dirty Sexy Money. After the show was cancelled, Brusso went on another recurring role as Detective Alicia Fernández on TNT's cop drama Southland. In 2012, she also started appearing on Fox's series Touch.

== Filmography ==
=== Film ===
Year	Title	Role	Notes
1999	Simpatico	Checkout Girl	
2003	Cradle 2 the Grave	Vanessa's Nanny	

=== Television ===
Year	Title	Role	Notes
1997	Melrose Place	Melanie	Episode: "Nope ain't telling you"
1997	Beverly Hills, 90210	Alana	Episode: "To Toil and Trouble"
1998	L.A. Doctors	ICU Nurse	Episode: "Leap of Faith"
1999	Crusade	Crew Member #1	Episode: "Racing the Night"
1999	G vs E	Heat Cone Woman	Episode: "Gee Your Hair Smells Evil"
2000	Diagnosis: Murder	Alma	Episode: "Two Birds with One Sloan"
2000	Sharing the Secret	Kerri Gold	TV film
2000	Growing Up Brady	Pam the Assistant	TV film
2000	Shasta McNasty	Receptionist	Episode: "The Sugar Pill"
2000	A Family in Crisis: The Elian Gonzales Story	Arianne	TV film
2000	City of Angels	Nurse Julie Sanders	Episode: "Bride and Prejudice"
2000	Time of Your Life	Potential Investor	Episode: "The Time They Found a Solution"
2001	Crossing Jordan	Nanny Officer	Episode: "Sight Unseen"
2002	Resurrection Blvd.	Myrna	Episode: "Esperando Lagrimas"
2003	The Division	Patty Clark	Episode: "Diagnosis"
2004	Without a Trace	Nurse	Episode: "American Goddess"
2004	LAX	Pushy Mother	Episode: "Thanksgiving"
2004	NYPD Blue	Narcotics Officer Nina Turley	Episode: "I Like Ike"
2005	ER	Mari Hinojosa	Episode: "Only Connect"
2006	Faceless	Tita	TV film
2006	Desperate Housewives	Maternity Nurse	Episode: "Everybody Says Don't"
2006	Huff	Ms. Esposito	Episode: "Black Shadows"
2006	Dr. Vegas	Reporter	Episode: "For Love or Money"
2007	NCIS	Noemi Cruz	Episode: "Angel of Death"
2007	Cold Case	Abby Santos	Episode: "Thick as Thieves"
2007	Bones	Parole Officer Erica Davis	Episode: "The Knight on the Grid"
2007–2008	Dirty Sexy Money	Maria	Recurring role (5 episodes)
2008	Jericho	Texan Doctor	Episode: "Patriots and Tyrants"
2008	Criminal Minds	Lidia	Episode: "Tabula Rasa"
2009–2013	Southland	Det. Alicia Fernandez	Recurring role (13 episodes)
2010	Wizards of Waverly Place	Julie Cucuy	Episode: "Alex Gives Up"
2011	Law & Order: LA	Ava Ruiz	Episode: "East Pasadena"
2012	Touch	Sheri Strepling	Recurring role (9 episodes)
2013	The Mentalist	Elena	Episode: "The Red Barn"
2015	American Horror Story: Hotel	Dr. Kohan	Episode: "Mommy"
2015	The Fosters	Det. Hernandez	Episode: "Light of Day"
2018	Blue Bloods	Blanca Escobar	Episode: "My Aim is True"
2020	The Stranger	Captain Vasquez	3 episodes
2021-2023	9-1-1: Lone Star	Andrea Reyes	10 episodes
