= Stand Down Soldier =

2015 film by Jeryl Prescott

- Stand Down Soldier - 2015 Movie Cover
- Directed by: Jeryl Prescott
- Written by: Jeryl Prescott
- Starring: Jeryl Prescott; Kevin Jackson; T'Shaun Barrett; Diarra Kilpatrick; Shanti Lowry
- Cinematography: Jeffrey T. Brown
- Edited by: Leander T. Sales
- Production companies: Signifying Stage & Screen Productions, Inc.
- Release date: 2015
- Country: United States
- Language: English

Stand Down Soldier is a 2015 film about a PTSD-afflicted woman war veteran, directed by Jeryl Prescott. The film was distributed by ArtMattan Films and Urban Movie Channel, and was reported to have a New York premier at the 2015 African Diaspora International Film Festival and to have screened at other ADIFF events.

== Development ==
“My desire with the film is to make people aware that these women sacrificed so much and that their sacrifices aren’t over when their active duty ends. When one soldier is deployed, a whole community is affected.”

— Prescott on Stand Down Soldier

Prescott has said that the story came from her personal familiarity with family members and women around her who had served in the military and who had problems re-integrating with civilian life after deployment, combined with other reports that she had read of service, bravery, trauma, sexual abuse within the military, and family disruption. Prescott interviewed women soldiers in South Carolina as preparation and collaborated with psychologist Dr. Felicia Sheffield. The experiences of 14 women were used for the story.

Due to the low budget, Prescott "called in favors" from friends who worked for lower pay than usual, and also used IndieGoGo. The film was edited by Prescott's husband, Leander Sales, an experienced editor who had also edited Spike Lee's Get on the Bus and worked on other films by Lee.

== Plot ==
A veteran, Stacy (Jeryl Prescott), is questioned by a psychiatric counselor about her recent return home from deployment in Iraq. In response to various questions, she says she is lonely, angry, was raped by a service member, and is lacking friends partly because they died in the war and she personally had to gather their remains. A flashback shows her playing with a fellow soldier near a humvee in a desert environment. While driving out of the parking lot, she has an emotional breakdown and accidentally collides with another vehicle. The other driver walks over to her car window and yells at her, but she is mostly unresponsive. The psychiatrist tries to intervene.

Elsewhere, Stacy doesn't realize it's the 4th of July and is bothered by the sound of fireworks explosions. She sits motionless on the ground outside a building and is found by a police officer, Officer Friendly (Harry Lennix). Her husband, Jesse Sr. (Kevin Jackson), arrives and brings her home. He attempts to comfort her, but certain physical motions trigger traumatic memories. Stacy tries exercise and tennis to relax, but various sounds remind her of patrol duty in Iraq. She hallucinates holding a rifle on a tennis court instead of a tennis racket. She has intense sweats and complains about the amount of medication to the psychiatrist.

A friend, Tinisha (Lyn Alicia Henderson), casually warns her that husbands are unfaithful, but Stacy says her husband would never cheat on her. She tells the psychiatrist that she is unable to have sex with her husband. At home, she finds a woman's earring in her bed, and finds and attacks the woman who had slept with her husband by dragging and threatening her. She medicates and sits on the floor of a bathroom. She medicates on a bus. She walks around in a daze and is arrested by Officer Friendly.

After she is released, she routinely buys more pharmaceuticals from a nurse, Michael (Eddie Rouse), who steals them from his medical workplace. Michael drives her around the neighborhood in his car while they argue about price and the tension of their ongoing arrangement. In the distraction of the argument, he accidentally hits a child in the street. Michael threatens that if he goes to prison, Stacy will too, and he drives away without helping the child. Stacy has a delayed recognition that the child is her grandson, Luke.

Stacy's involvement in the accident becomes known, and turmoil occurs with her son and among various family members and friends with overlapping spousal connections. Terri (Shanti Lowry), the mother of the child, has an intense fight with her friend Billi (Diarra Kilpatrick), who is the current girlfriend of Jesse Jr. (T'Shaun Barrett), the father of the child. Jesse Jr. is himself a veteran who has just returned from deployment and didn't yet know that he had a child. Jesse Jr. begins teaching at a kindergarten and cares for a young child who mistakenly believes that he caused Luke's accident with mean wishes.

Stacy's husband brings her to a rehab facility. He secretly goes on a trip to track down and punish the man who raped Stacy, and confronts him with a gun. A gunshot is heard offscreen. At the rehab center, Stacy has withdrawal sickness and wakes up screaming in the night.

Stacy recounts to the psychiatrist that after she turned in the rapist, she herself was investigated and had to continue working alongside the rapist because the military only "wants to cover their asses." Stacy turns Michael in to the police regardless of risk to herself. Among her friends, Stacy is told that she's lucky to have her husband because her situation would scare most men. Jesse Sr. enacts a plan to re-live his and Stacy's prom night as a form of starting over, and receives criticism and advice about it from a stranger (Sharon Brathwaite). Stacy accepts the plan.

== Release ==
The film was acquired and distributed by ArtMattan Films and Urban Movie Channel, and was reported to have a New York premier at the 2015 African Diaspora International Film Festival. It was later screened at other ADIFF events including in Chicago in 2016 and a later women-focussed ADIFF selection in 2021.. A press release said that the film was exhibited at the GI Film Festival (ADIFF). It was also screened by the Pittsburgh Cultural Trust.

== Reception ==
In a review at Highbrow Magazine, critic Sandra Bertrand wrote, "it was both revelatory and refreshing to see that a film about a soldier's return home from active duty in Iraq is focused on a woman" but said that the story was a tangle of subplots and that she wished for a tighter focus on Stacy's character. Elaine Hegwood Bowen of The Chicago Crusader wrote in her review that the film is "poignant" and has a "remarkable social significance." She noted, "The toll that war and active duty can have on a female is one that I’ve not seen before."
