= Bryan Terrell Clark =

American actor & singer (born 1980)

- Born: April 9, 1980 (age 46); Baltimore, Maryland, U.S.
- Occupations: Actor, singer
- Years active: 2000–present
- Spouse: Devario Simmons (m. 2022)

Bryan Terrell Clark (born April 9, 1980) is an American actor, singer-songwriter and stage director, known for his performances on Broadway. He made his Broadway debut playing singer Marvin Gaye in Motown: The Musical, which received a 2014 Grammy Award nomination for Best Musical Theater Album. Clark played George Washington in the Broadway production of Hamilton in 2017, Cory Maxson in 2006 production of Fences at the Pasadena Playhouse, and starred in 2021 original Broadway production of Thoughts of a Colored Man.

== Life and career ==
Clark was born April 9, 1980, and raised in Baltimore, Maryland. He graduated from the Yale School of Drama and Temple University in 2003. He began his career appearing in films Little Red (2000), Forget About It (2006), Blue State (2007), ATM (2012), Heaven Is for Real (2014) and Collateral Beauty (2016). On television, he guest-starred on The Unit, CSI: NY, House of Payne, Unforgettable and Person of Interest. He made his stage debut in Cory Maxson in 2006 production of Fences at the Pasadena Playhouse opposite Laurence Fishburne and Angela Bassett, and in 2009 performed in Pippin. As a singer, Clark performed with Maxwell, Brandy Norwood, Ne-Yo, Anita Baker and Michael Bublé and was co-writer on Mary J. Blige's song "Irreversible" on her album My Life II... The Journey Continues (Act 1).

In 2013, Clark made his Broadway debut playing singer Marvin Gaye in the original Broadway production of Motown: The Musical, which received a 2014 Grammy Award nomination for Best Musical Theater Album. In 2015 he starred in Immediate Family directed by Phylicia Rashad. In 2017 he was cast as George Washington in the Broadway production of Hamilton and played songwriter Terry Lewis in the BET miniseries, The New Edition Story. He appeared in two episodes of Fox musical drama series Empire in 2017 and later guest-starred on Blue Bloods, NCIS: New Orleans and Zoey's Extraordinary Playlist. Clark featured in a number of Ava DuVernay's projects, include Queen Sugar, When They See Us, and Cherish the Day. In 2021 he had recurring role in the TNT post-apocalyptic series, Snowpiercer as Pastor Logan and played one of leads in the original Broadway production of Thoughts of a Colored Man. The following year he guest-starred on Inventing Anna and Gossip Girl and starred in the musical comedy film Sneakerella, the film was released on Disney+. In 2023, Clark appeared in films She Came to Me and Our Son and had a recurring role in the Hulu drama series, Saint X. In 2024, he was cast in the BET+ mystery comedy-drama series, Diarra from Detroit.

== Personal life ==
Clark is openly gay. In 2022 he married Devario Simmons, a costume designer. They met in December 2019.

== Filmography ==
=== Film ===
| Year | Title | Role | Notes |
|---|---|---|---|
| 2000 | Little Red | Gerald | |
| 2002 | Jitters | Nicky | Short |
| 2006 | Forget About It | Bodyguard | |
| 2007 | Blue State | The Horny American | |
| 2012 | ATM | Jerry | |
| 2012 | Home Alone: The Holiday Heist | SWAT Commander | TV movie |
| 2014 | Heaven Is for Real | Turce | |
| 2016 | Collateral Beauty | Homeless A Capella Singer | |
| 2018 | For the Love of Musiq | Uncle James | Short |
| 2019 | All the Little Things We Kill | David Soto | |
| 2022 | Sneakerella | Trey | |
| 2023 | She Came to Me | Frank Hall | |
| 2023 | Our Son | Jacob | |

=== Television ===
| Year | Title | Role | Notes |
|---|---|---|---|
| 2006 | The Unit | Soldier | Episode: "Change of Station" |
| 2008 | CSI: NY | Duckens LaBranche | Episode: "Enough" |
| 2009 | Tyler Perry's House of Payne | Treyvon | Episode: "A Sister's Payne" |
| 2012 | Shitty Fabulous Lives | John Avery | Episode: "Plans Change" |
| 2014 | Unforgettable | Andre 'AK' Kade | Episode: "The Combination" |
| 2015 | The Mysteries of Laura | Trent Hawthorne | Episode: "The Mystery of the Frozen Foodie" |
| 2015 | Person of Interest | Tim Rollins | Episode: "Guilty" |
| 2016 | Royal Pains | Officer John | Episode: "The Good News Is..." |
| 2017 | The New Edition Story | Terry Lewis | Episode: "Part 1-3" |
| 2017 | Empire | Tony | Recurring Cast: Season 4 |
| 2018 | Blue Bloods | Joe Price | Episode: "Risk Management" |
| 2018 | NCIS: New Orleans | Todd Jamieson | Episode: "In the Blood" |
| 2019 | When They See Us | Starks (Guard) | Episode: "Part Four" |
| 2019 | Queen Sugar | Leo St. Clair | Recurring Cast: Season 4 |
| 2020 | Cherish the Day | Jason Comeaux | Episode: "Synopsis" |
| 2020 | While We Breathe | Himself | Episode: "Hashtag Me Not" |
| 2021 | Snowpiercer | Pastor Logan | Recurring Cast: Season 2 |
| 2021 | Zoey's Extraordinary Playlist | Brad | Episode: "Zoey's Extraordinary Double Date" |
| 2022 | Inventing Anna | Brian | Episode: "Friends in Low Places" |
| 2022 | Gossip Girl | Garrett Barnes | Episode: "Guess Who's Coming at Dinner" |
| 2023 | Saint X | Paul | Recurring Cast |
| 2024 | Diarra from Detroit | Mr. Tea | Main Cast |
