= The Comedian (The Twilight Zone) =

- The Twilight Zone episode
- Episode no.: Season 1 Episode 1
- Directed by: Owen Harris
- Written by: Alex Rubens
- Original air date: April 1, 2019
- Running time: 54 minutes

Guest appearances
- Kumail Nanjiani as Samir Wassan; Amara Karan as Rena; Diarra Kilpatrick as Didi Scott; Ryan Robbins as David Kendall; Tracy Morgan as J.C. Wheeler

Episode chronology
| ← Previous — | Next → "Nightmare at 30,000 Feet" |

"The Comedian" is the first episode of the 2019 version of the anthology television series The Twilight Zone. It was released on April 1, 2019, on CBS All Access. The episode was also posted on YouTube available in full length without signup or payment.

== Opening narration ==
Samir Wassan is an artist of great principle. A man who refuses to compromise his beliefs for a cheap joke, but tonight, he felt the rush of the limelight for the first time. Now, he'll have to decide what really matters to him when the laughter stops, and how much he's willing to give... to The Twilight Zone.

== Plot ==
Struggling comedian Samir Wassan meets legendary comic J.C. Wheeler, who advises him to include personal material in his routines. After doing a successful routine centered around his dog, Samir returns home and discovers that not only did his dog vanish, but no one seems to remember that his dog ever existed.

He then learns that jokes about the people in his life get laughs, but cause them to disappear from existence. After accidentally erasing his nephew, Devin, Samir starts erasing people he thinks the world would be better off without. His girlfriend Rena leaves him after the erasing of her teacher David Kendall causes her to go from a successful lawyer to a struggling waitress. After another encounter with Wheeler, Samir continues abusing his power, going so far as erasing rival comic Joe Donner.

After Samir has another encounter with Wheeler, Rena confronts him during a set with a journal containing names of those he's erased. Realizing what he has done, Samir erases himself from existence.

Everyone previously erased exists again. Samir's friend and fellow comedian Didi, now a rising star, meets Wheeler following a set and asks for his advice. The final shot shows Samir on the club's audience member mural, hinting that this has happened to multiple comedians.

== Closing narration ==
Samir Wassan learned the hard way that sometimes, getting everything you want means losing everything you love. And after finally finding himself on the verge of becoming somebody, he chose instead to once again be a nobody. In the end, Samir's final encore is a show you can only buy a ticket to... in The Twilight Zone.

== Cast ==
- Kumail Nanjiani as Samir Wassan
- Amara Karan as Rena
- Diarra Kilpatrick as Didi Scott
- Toby Hargrave as Joe Donner
- Ryan Robbins as David Kendall
- Tracy Morgan as J.C. Wheeler

Keith Phipps of Vulture describes J.C. as "a fantasy version of Dave Chappelle" who has "a relaxed demeanor".

== Background ==
The inspiration for this episode was "Take My Life...Please!" from the 1985 series. Rosie Knight of The Hollywood Reporter stated, "Samir's story appears to take a large influence from [...] Death Note."

== Reception ==
Jim Vorel of Paste Magazine wrote that the episode took too long, citing issues with the 60-minute timeslot in the original series, and that the material used for the jokes which the characters laugh about in-universe is not funny out of universe. Keith Phipps of Vulture.com gave the episode two of five stars and also cited the length as being too long, stating that "the pace drags, the premise gets needlessly complicated, and by the time the climax rolls around the ending seems kind of obvious". Phipps however reacted positively to the "topical references" and the episode being "true to the spirit of the original show without feeling confined by it". The Guardian said that Diarra Kilpatrick's presence was so invigorating that it almost cured flaws in the script.
