= West of Hell =

- Directed by: Michael Steves
- Written by: Gabi Chennisi Duncombe; Bubba Fish; Michael Steves
- Starring: Tony Todd; Michael Eklund; Lance Henriksen
- Release date: January 21, 2018 (United Kingdom)
- Running time: 80 minutes
- Country: United States
- Language: English

West of Hell is a 2018 American horror Western film directed by Michael Steves and starring Tony Todd, Michael Eklund and Lance Henriksen.

== Cast ==
- Tony Todd as Jericho Whitfield
- Michael Eklund as Roland Bursley
- Lance Henriksen as The Devil
- June Laporte as Annie Hargraves (credited as Jennifer Laporte)
- Jill Hoiles as Grace McDowell
- Jeryl Prescott as Desdemona Lark
- Richard Riehle as Mr. Braxton
- Yousef Abu-Taleb as Father Locke
- Nick Bennett as Wesley
- Omono Okojie as Clara Whitfield
- Ben Adams as Lenesh
- Mark Christopher Lawrence as Abram
- Anna Borchert as The Brunswick Whore
- Ashley Drayton as Sellah Lark
- Sewell Whitney as Nathaniel Hickson
- Julia Aks as Jittery Demon
- Damien Bernicky as Gunslinger Demon
- Sean Michael Beyer as First Challenge Demon (voice)
- Lance Caraway as Gunslinger Demon
- Dwayne Marion Johnson as Slave Demon (credited as Dwayne Johnson)
- Michael G. Nathan as Demon Whispers (voice)

== Reception ==
James Evans of Starburst gave the film a negative review and wrote, "Made for nowt and unable to hide budget limitations, the film tries to keep your attention with basic philosophising on good and evil and occasional nudity and gore, but it’s all for nought because there’s little substance here."
