= The Salton Sea (2016 film) =

- Directed by: Veena Sud
- Written by: Veena Sud
- Produced by: Veena Sud; Chad Ostrom; Daniel De La Nuez; Shana Fischer Huber; Liza Wiles; Stephen Kasher
- Starring: Jamie Anne Allman; Diarra Kilpatrick
- Cinematography: Brian Rigney Hubbard
- Edited by: Phil Fowler
- Music by: Gingger Shankar
- Release date: April 9, 2016 (Sarasota)
- Running time: 87 minutes
- Country: United States
- Language: English

The Salton Sea is a 2016 American guerrilla film written by Veena Sud, an avant garde crime thriller starring Jamie Anne Allman and Diarra Kilpatrick. The experimental film was shot over the course of two weekends near the Salton Sea in California.

It was screened on April 9, 2016, at the Sarasota Film Festival.

== Synopsis ==
A woman (Allman) drives aimlessly alone through the Southwestern United States, running from her past. Drunk one early morning, she hits something on a remote road. Unsure if it was human or animal, alive or dead, she doesn't bother to check. She instead drives off in a panic and frantically tries to wash the blood off her car in a nearby, seemingly abandoned town. Then, she realizes she is being watched. A young hitchhiker (Kilpatrick), a lost soul herself, has wandered these desert roads for years. The hitchhiker blackmails the driver into giving her a ride to the ocean. On the road, the two strangers find solace and humor in one another. Their drive is a meditation on death, on one's checkered past, on grief, regret and, ultimately, finding one's way home. However, the driver realizes that her companion holds a secret that will profoundly change this journey.
