= Perry Mason (disambiguation) =

Perry Mason is a fictional criminal defense attorney, in works of detective fiction written by Erle Stanley Gardner.

Perry Mason may also refer to:

== Adaptations of Erle Stanley Gardner works ==
- Perry Mason (theatrical film series), a series of six American films released in the 1930s
- Perry Mason (radio series), broadcast on CBS Radio from 1943–55
- Perry Mason (1957 TV series), a 1957–1966 American legal drama television series broadcast on CBS Television
- The New Perry Mason, a 1973 TV series broadcast on CBS
- Perry Mason (TV film series), a series of 30 television film sequels to the CBS-TV series broadcast on NBC (1985–1995)
- Perry Mason (2020 TV series), a 2020 television series broadcast on HBO.

== Publishing ==
- Perry Mason & Co., a publisher of The Youth's Companion, inspiration for Erle Stanley Gardner

== Music ==
- "Perry Mason", an Ozzy Osbourne song on the album Ozzmosis
- Jah Mason (born 1970), reggae artist formerly known as Perry Mason

== See also ==
- Perry Mason bibliography, novels and short stories written by Erle Stanley Gardner
