= African Diaspora Film Festival =

Annual film festival held in New York City, U.S.

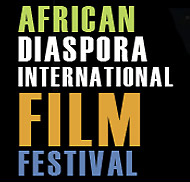
- Location: Harlem, New York, US
- Founded: 1992
- Founded by: Diarah N'Daw-Spech; Reinaldo Barroso-Spech
- Website: nyadiff.org

The African Diaspora International Film Festival (ADIFF) (originally African Diaspora Film Festival) is a film festival founded in 1992 by the French-Malian Diarah N'Daw-Spech and her husband, Reinaldo Barroso-Spech, a Cuban of Haitian and Jamaican descent. ADIFF brings together the work of filmmakers from the African diaspora and from Africa, and it includes selections from Europe, Latin America, Asia, Africa, and America. The organization is based in New York City and also holds events in Chicago, Washington, D.C., and Paris, where it is known as FIFDA.

The 2025 event took place from 29 November to 15 December in New York and included 70 films from 30 countries. ADIFF is one of two African film festivals in New York City, the other being NYAFF.

== Background ==
Founders Diarah N'Daw-Spech, a French-Malian, and her husband, Reinaldo Barroso-Spech, a Cuban of Haitian and Jamaican descent, have said that as young cinema enthusiasts, they rarely found movies that reflected their Black experiences. They created ADIFF to showcase the lives and realities of people of African descent around the world.

When asked about the festival's goals in a NY1 interview in 2025, N'Daw-Spech said:

"The goal is to say something. All of the films have a strong social commentary. People are enriched by the experience. It's more than entertainment, it's a way to discover a new world, to be acquainted with other lives, other people, other peoples' lives of African descent anywhere in the world. And see what we have in common, what we have that's different, and what we share."

== Reception ==
The film critic Kathleen Sachs of the Chicago Reader wrote, "The films in the [2019 ADIFF in Chicago] do what much media and even the public school system fail to do: educate." She added that "there's much to learn from these films, and the programmers have organized the festival in such a way that the lessons build upon one another. [...] The selections add further dimensions to already complex issues."

Ben Sachs at the Chicago Reader wrote that the annual event "provides a good excuse to explore the great cinema produced by Africa and the people from its widespread diasporas". The NY1 newscaster Dean Meminger noted in an interview, "these films sometimes cannot be seen in other places, even on streaming services." Ubrick Quenum at Agence Ecofin wrote that the themes of the 2026 Paris event selections "resonate with tensions affecting several African societies today, particularly amid recent xenophobic violence in South Africa."

== Programming ==
The Columbia University Institute of African Studies has said that ADIFF "presents, interprets, and educates about films that explore the human experience of people of color all over the world in order to inspire imaginations, disrupt stereotypes and help transform attitudes that perpetuate injustice."

ADIFF screenings have included discussions with film directors and actors as well as historians, doctors, sociologists, and legal scholars whose work is relevant to the films.

ADIFF runs a program that revisits films suppressed or previously banned for challenging social, political, and religious norms or for dealing with sexuality. A 2021 event that focused on films by women was called "a modest celebration" by Harlem World Magazine and was described by the critic Sandra Bertrand at Highbrow Magazine as a resounding demonstration of the glass ceiling being broken. A 2019 selection served as a Black History Month series and was attended by Danny Glover for a showing of his film The Robeson Effect.

The film scholar Mahomed Bamba has written that through ADIFF, and the creation of many similar African film festivals, "the public has the opportunity to see samples of the large collection of filmic images from Black worlds (Africa, Brazil, Caribbean, etc)".

== Institutional connections ==
ADIFF has often partnered with Facets Cinemateque, and it has also been supported by the DePaul University Center for Black Diaspora, TV5 Monde, the Quebec Government Office in Chicago, Columbia University, and the Schomburg Center. Some events have been jointly organized and hosted by the Institute for African Studies at Columbia. ADIFF has occasionally re-shown films from FESPACO.
