= Nordic International Film Festival =

Annual film festival founded in 2014, held in New York City

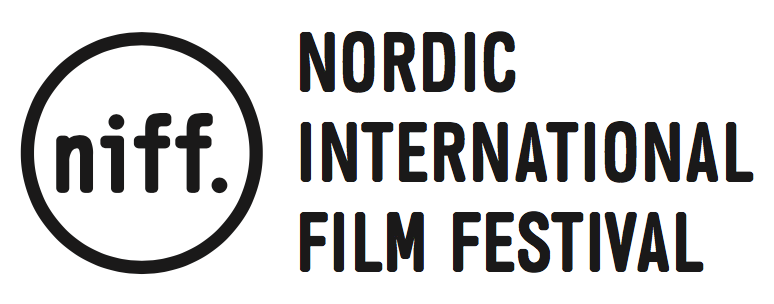
- Location: New York City, United States
- Founded: 30 October 2014
- Website: nordicfilmfest.org

Nordic International Film Festival is an annual film festival founded in 2014, held in New York City, showcasing Nordic and international films at Fotografiska New York.

The festival is founded and run by Festival Director Johan Matton and Creative Director Linnea Larsdotter. The festival is the biggest Nordic film festival outside of Europe.

Nordic International Film Festival is also known as "NIFF" and screen only world and east coast premiers.

Nordic International Film Festival is a festival that works towards gender equality with a higher percentage of female filmmakers than any other film festival in the world.

== Award hosts ==
- 2019 – Sarita Choudhury
- 2018 – Al Pitcher
- 2017 – Reed Birney
- 2016 – Björn Gustafsson
- 2015 – Jacob A Ware
