= List of programs broadcast by the American Broadcasting Company =

The American Broadcasting Company (ABC) is an American commercial broadcasting television network that launched in 1948. It is owned by the Disney Entertainment division of The Walt Disney Company and is one of the "Big Four" television networks. Below is a list of programs currently broadcast on the network.

== Current programming ==
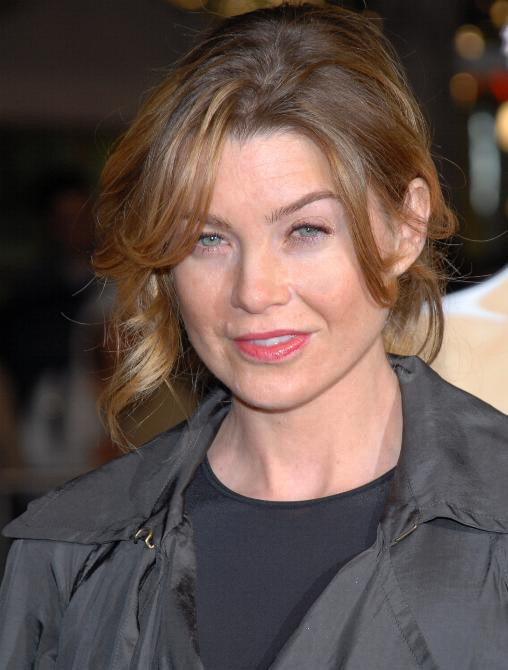
Ellen Pompeo – star of the drama series Grey's Anatomy

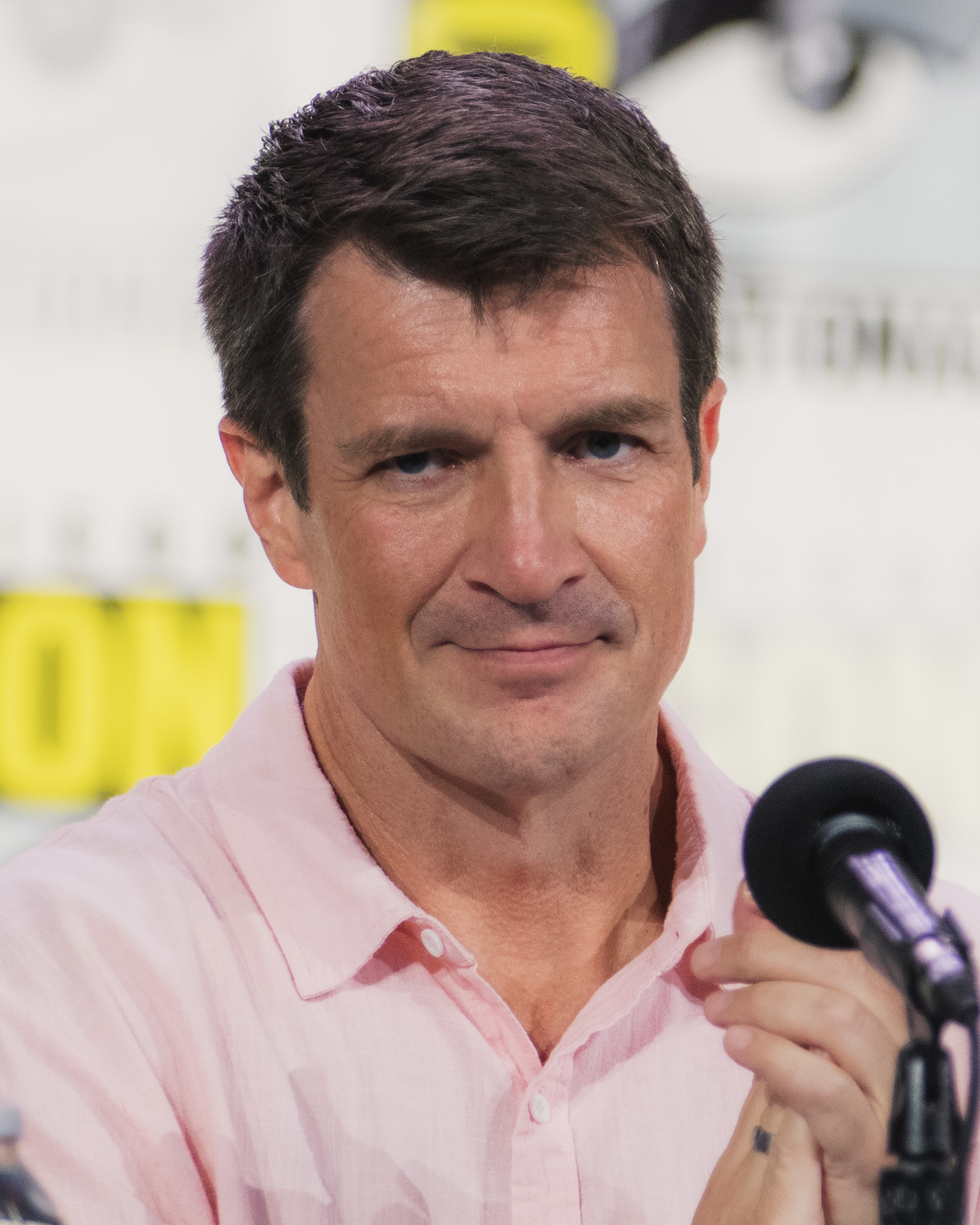
Nathan Fillion – star of the drama series The Rookie

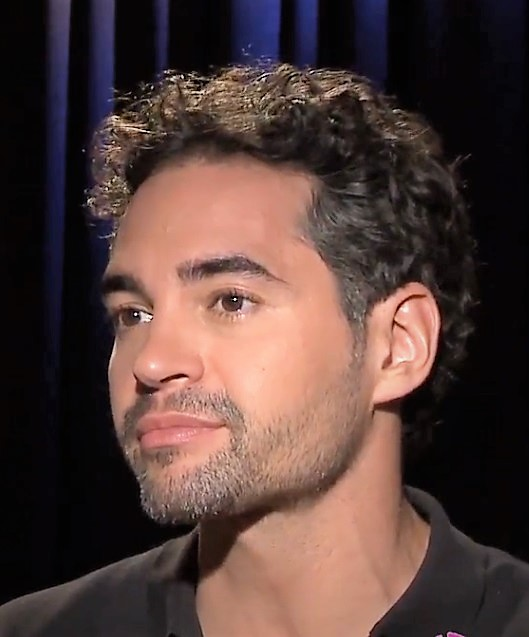
Ramón Rodríguez – star of the drama series Will Trent

Quinta Brunson – creator and star of the comedy series Abbott Elementary

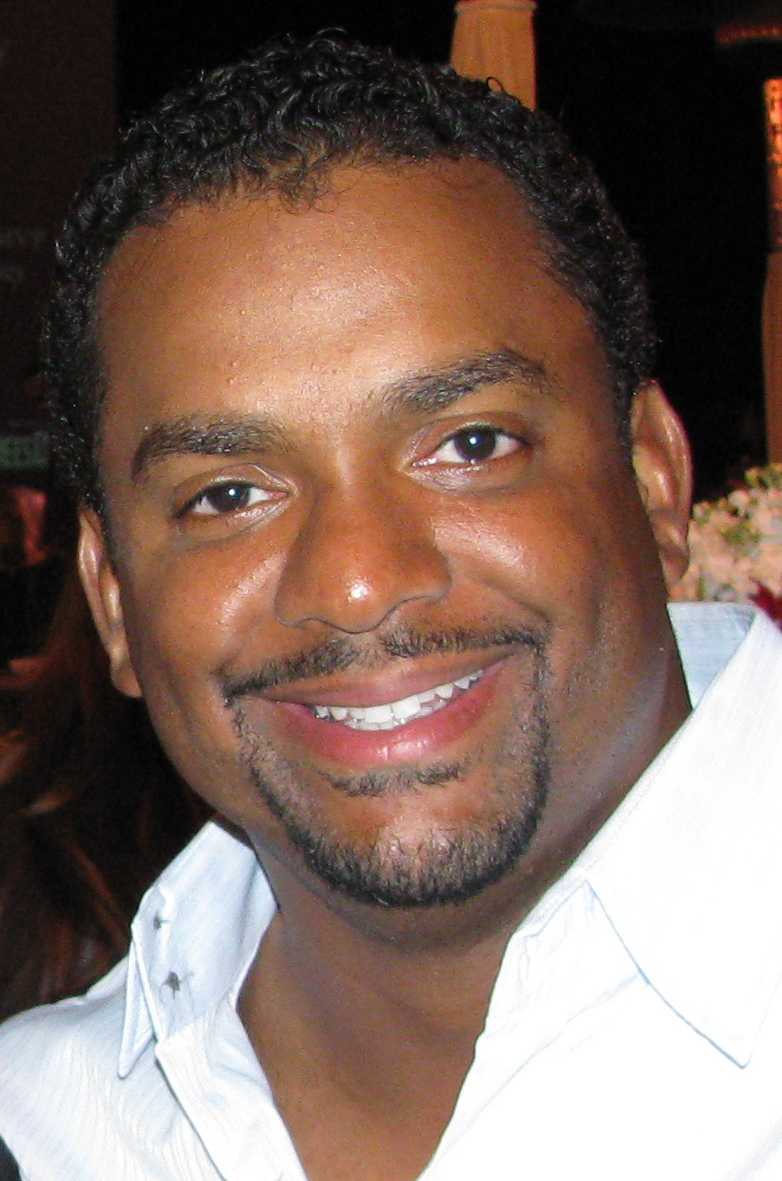
Alfonso Ribeiro – host of the reality series America's Funniest Home Videos and Dancing with the Stars

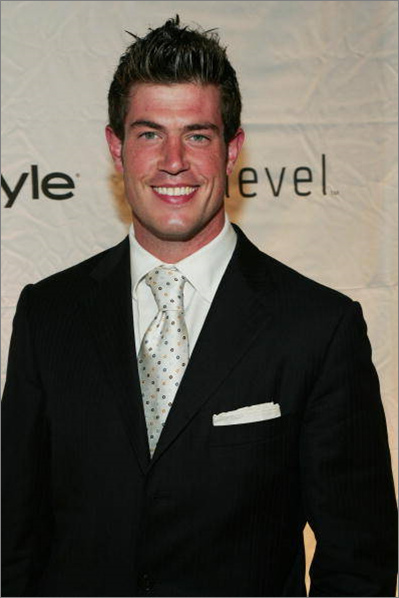
Jesse Palmer – host of the reality series The Bachelor, The Bachelorette, and Bachelor in Paradise and commentator for College Football on ABC

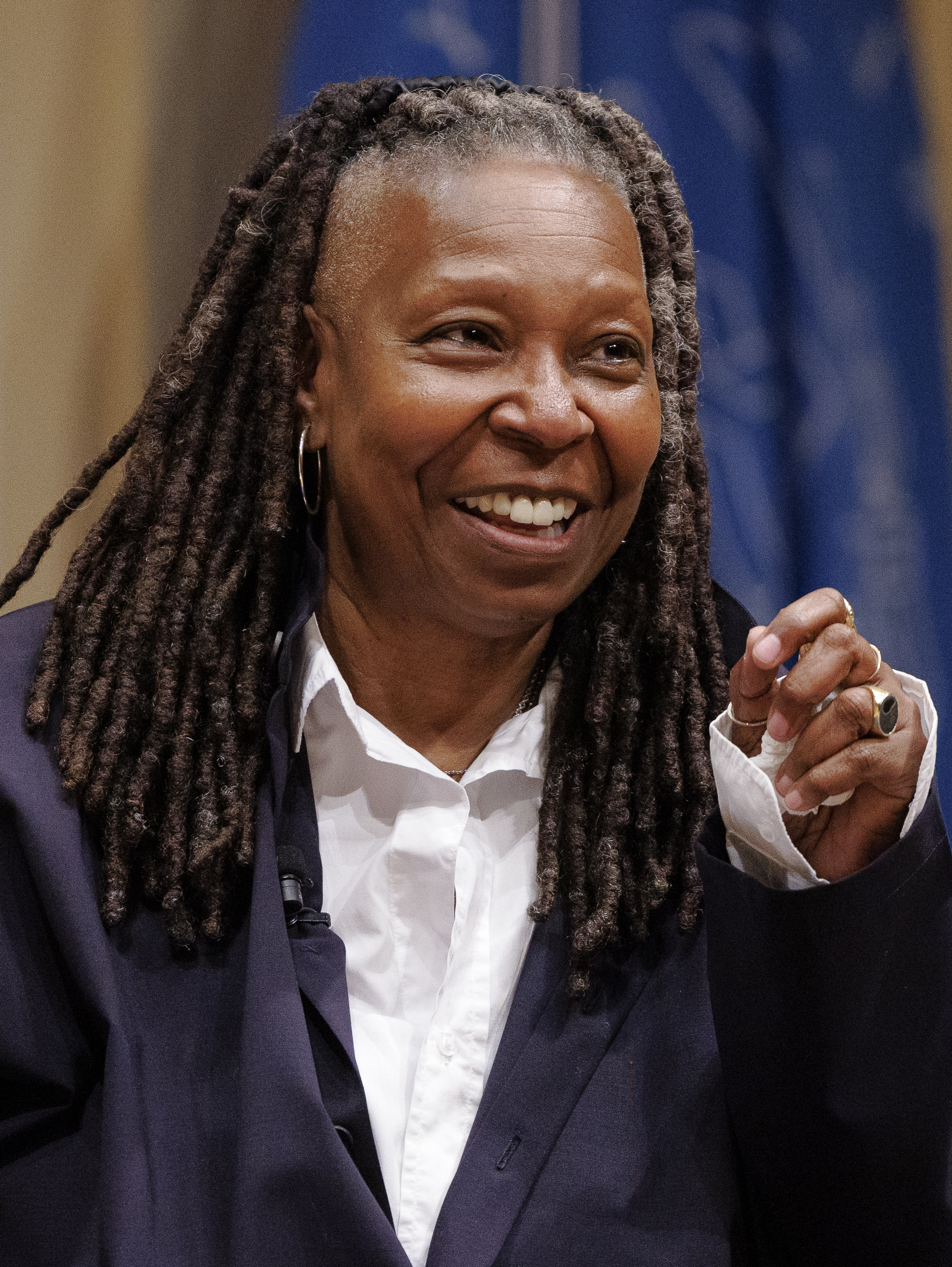
Whoopi Goldberg – moderator of the talk show The View

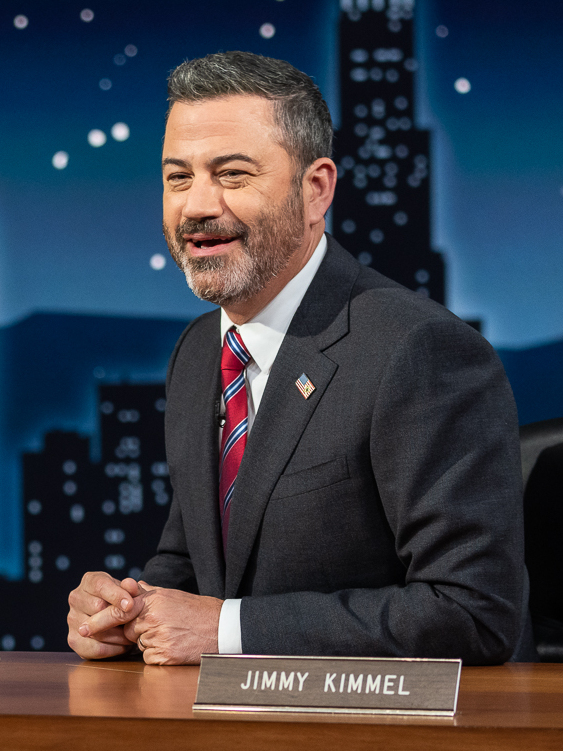
Jimmy Kimmel – host of the talk show Jimmy Kimmel Live!

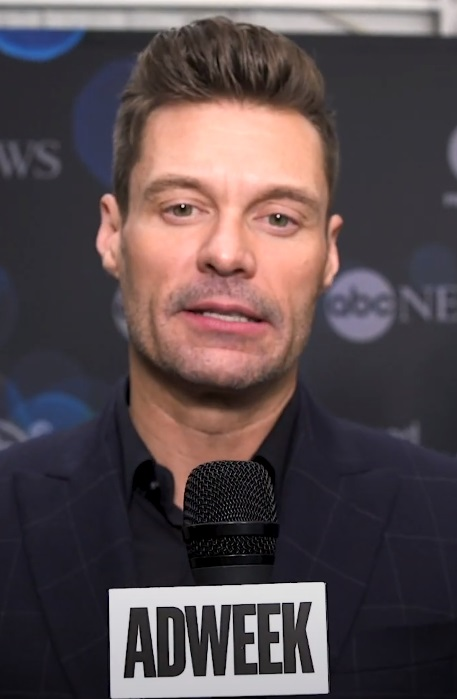
Ryan Seacrest – host of Celebrity Wheel of Fortune, American Idol, and Dick Clark's New Year's Rockin' Eve

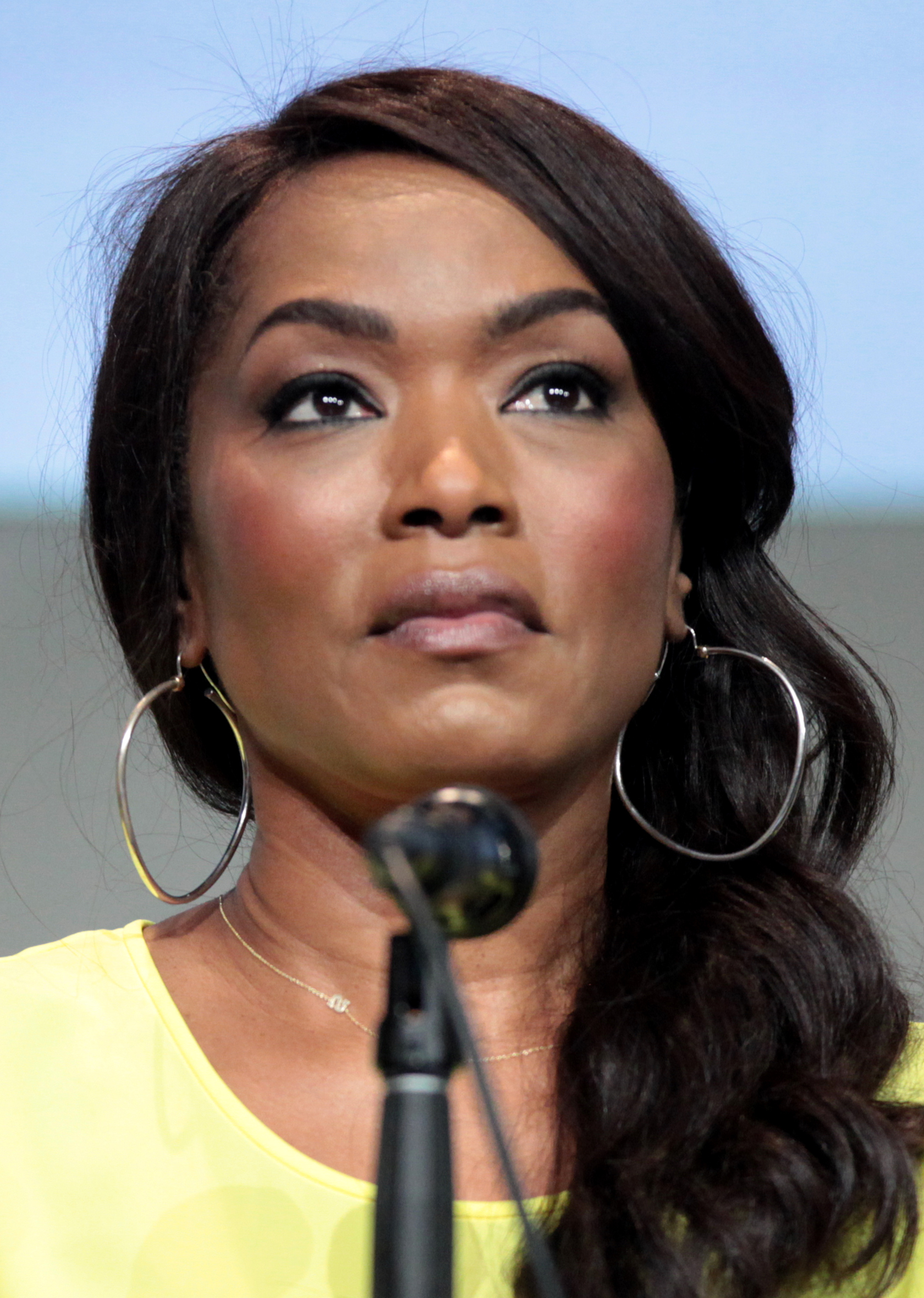
Angela Bassett – star of the drama series 9-1-1

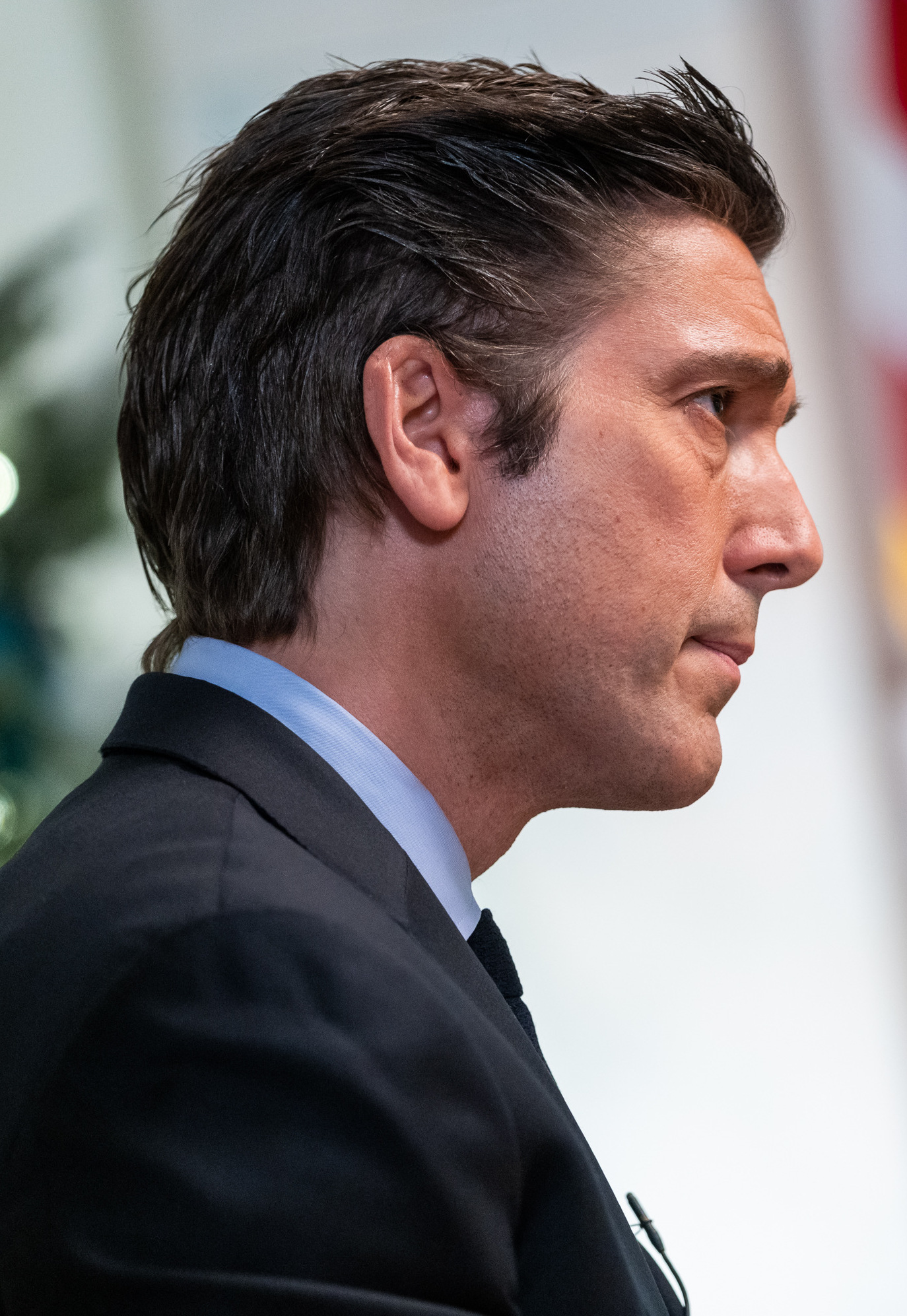
David Muir – anchor of ABC World News Tonight and 20/20

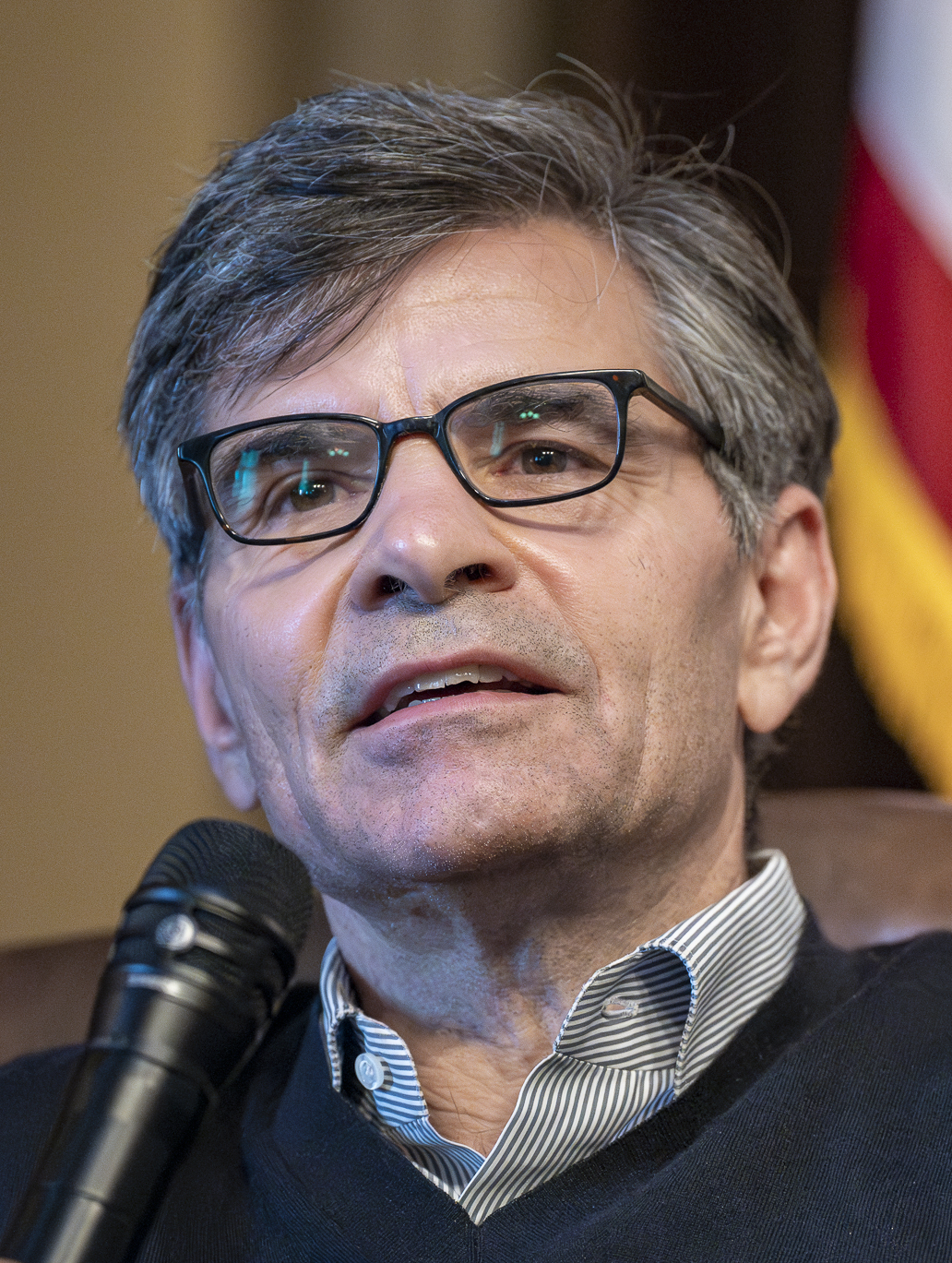
George Stephanopoulos – anchor of Good Morning America and host of This Week

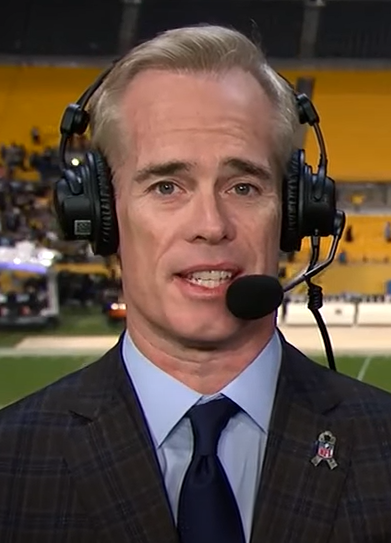
Joe Buck – announcer for Monday Night Football

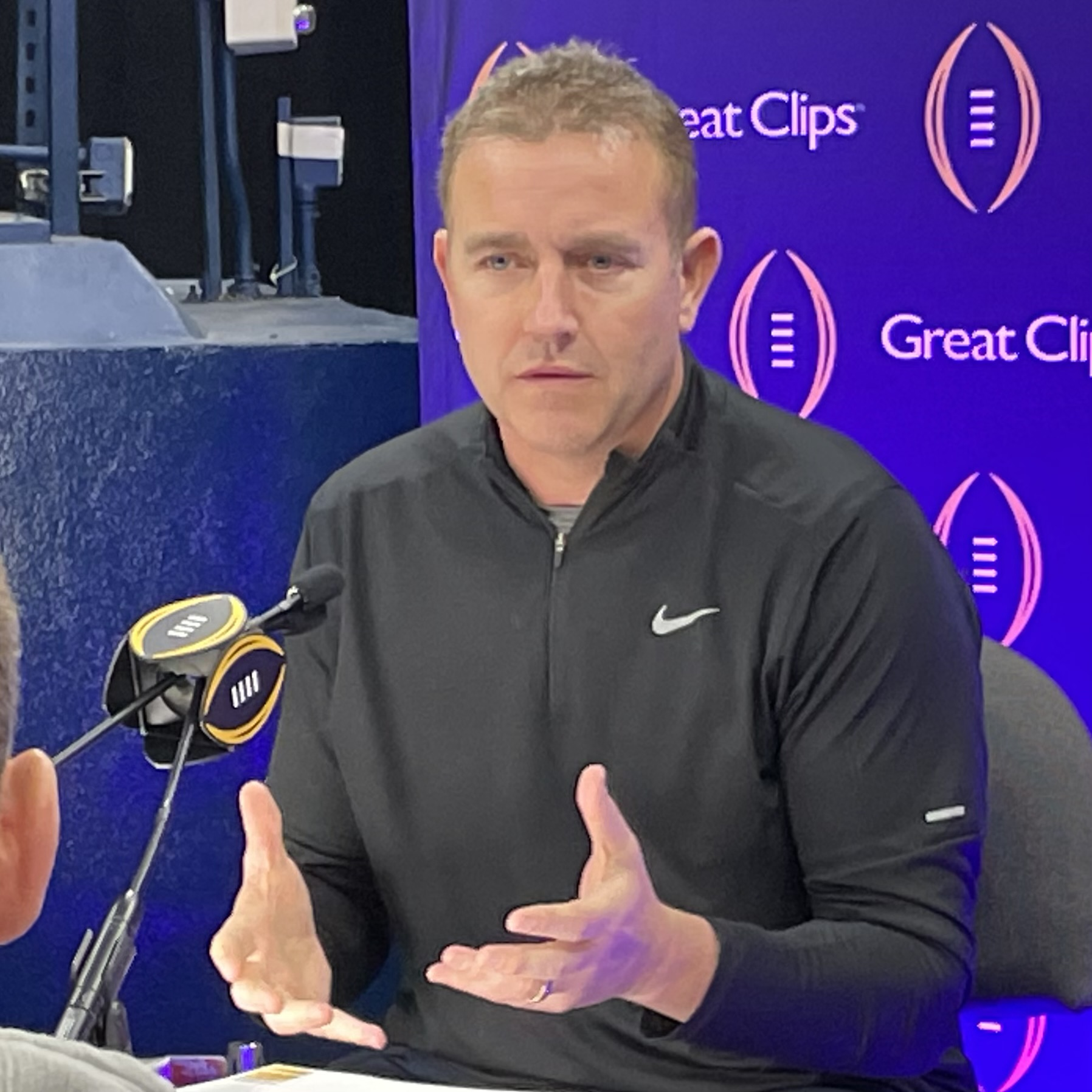
Kirk Herbstreit – commentator for Saturday Night Football

=== Drama ===
Title	Genre	Premiere	Seasons	Runtime	Status
Grey's Anatomy	Medical drama	March 27, 2005	23 seasons, 471 episodes	43–53 min	Season 23 ongoing
The Rookie	Police procedural	October 16, 2018	8 seasons, 144 episodes	42–45 min	Season 9 due to premiere on January 6, 2027
Will Trent	Police procedural	January 3, 2023	4 seasons, 59 episodes	43–44 min	Season 5 due to premiere on January 5, 2027
High Potential	Crime drama	September 17, 2024	2 seasons, 31 episodes	43–44 min	Season 3 due to premiere on January 5, 2027
9-1-1: Nashville	Procedural drama	October 9, 2025	2 seasons, 23 episodes	42–45 min	Season 2 ongoing
R.J. Decker	Crime drama	March 3, 2026	2 seasons, 16 episodes	42–45 min	Pending
Awaiting release
The Rookie: North	Police procedural	January 6, 2027	1 season, 10 episodes	TBA	Pending

=== Comedy ===
Title	Genre	Premiere	Seasons	Runtime	Status
Abbott Elementary	Workplace sitcom mockumentary	December 7, 2021	6 seasons, 99 episodes	21 min	Season 6 ongoing
Shifting Gears	Sitcom	January 8, 2025	2 seasons, 23 episodes	20–22 min	Season 3 due to premiere on January 6, 2027
Scrubs	Sitcom	February 25, 2026	2 seasons, 17 episodes	22 min	Season 2 ongoing

=== Unscripted ===
==== Docuseries ====
Title	Subject	Premiere	Seasons	Runtime	Status
Bad Romance: A Special Edition of 20/20	True crime	January 22, 2024	2 seasons, 16 episodes	39–41 min	Pending
Betrayal: Secrets & Lies	True crime	March 29, 2026	1 season, 8 episodes	40–42 min	Pending
Michael Strahan's Iconic Fashion	Fashion	November 10, 2026	3 episodes	42 min	Miniseries ongoing
Awaiting release
Surviving a Scandal	True crime	January 5, 2027	TBA	TBA	Pending

==== Reality ====
Title	Genre	Premiere	Seasons	Runtime	Status
America's Funniest Home Videos	Clip show	November 26, 1989	37 seasons, 844 episodes	43 min	Season 37 ongoing
The Bachelor	Reality competition	March 25, 2002	29 seasons, 306 episodes	40–125 min	Season 30 due to premiere on March 21, 2027
The Bachelorette	Reality competition	January 8, 2003	21 seasons, 234 episodes	40–125 min	Pending
Extreme Makeover: Home Edition	Reality television	February 15, 2004 (Note: The series originally ended on January 13, 2012, but resumed on January 2, 2025.)	10 seasons, 209 episodes (Note: Season 10 aired on HGTV.)	43 min	Pending
Dancing with the Stars	Reality competition	June 1, 2005	34 seasons, 514 episodes (Note: Season 31 exclusively aired on Disney+.)	40–121 min	Season 35 ongoing
What Would You Do?	Hidden camera	February 26, 2008	18 seasons, 164 episodes	41 min	Season 19 due to premiere on March 21, 2027
Shark Tank	Reality television	August 9, 2009	18 seasons, 384 episodes	43 min	Season 18 ongoing
The Great Christmas Light Fight	Reality competition	December 9, 2013	13 seasons, 82 episodes	42–44 min	Pending
Bachelor in Paradise	Reality competition	August 4, 2014	10 seasons, 110 episodes	72–127 min	Pending
The Golden Bachelor	Reality competition	September 28, 2023	2 seasons, 18 episodes	42–86 min	Pending
Dancing with the Stars: The Next Pro	Reality competition	July 13, 2026	1 season, 8 episodes	43 min	Pending
Awaiting release
Can You Hide... Shaq?	Reality competition	December 3, 2026	TBA	TBA	Pending

==== Game shows ====
Title	Genre	Premiere	Seasons	Runtime	Status
Who Wants to Be a Millionaire	Game show	August 16, 1999	10 seasons, 436 episodes (Note: Number of seasons aired on ABC. Seventeen seasons aired in first-run syndication.)	40–43 min	Pending
Celebrity Family Feud	Game show	June 21, 2015	12 seasons, 120 episodes	45–48 min	Pending
The $100,000 Pyramid	Game show	June 26, 2016	8 seasons, 100 episodes	44 min	Pending
Match Game	Game show	June 26, 2016 (Note: The series originally ended on July 28, 2021, but resumed on July 23, 2025.)	6 seasons, 73 episodes	42–46 min	Pending
Press Your Luck	Game show	June 12, 2019	7 seasons, 72 episodes	42 min	Pending
Celebrity Wheel of Fortune	Game show	January 7, 2021	7 seasons, 73 episodes	42 min	Season 7 ongoing (Note: The last 10 episodes of season 6 streamed on Disney+. Two of those episodes aired on ABC as of November 11, 2026.)
Celebrity Jeopardy!	Game show	September 25, 2022	4 seasons, 47 episodes	40–42 min	Season 5 due to premiere on January 29, 2027
Jeopardy! Masters	Game show	May 8, 2023	4 seasons, 37 episodes	42 min	Pending
The Greatest Average American	Game show	February 25, 2026	1 season, 8 episodes	42 min	Pending

==== Variety ====
Title	Genre	Premiere	Seasons	Runtime	Status
The View	Daytime talk show	August 11, 1997	30 seasons, 6,183 episodes	35–37 min	Season 30 ongoing
Jimmy Kimmel Live!	Late-night talk show	January 26, 2003	25 seasons, 3,588 episodes	41–42 min	Season 25 ongoing

=== Continuations ===
Title	Genre	Prev. network	Premiere	Seasons	Runtime	Status
American Idol (seasons 16–24)	Reality competition	Fox	March 11, 2018	9 seasons, 165 episodes	44–90 min	Season 25 due to premiere on February 8, 2027
9-1-1 (seasons 7–10)	Procedural drama	Fox	March 14, 2024	4 seasons, 52 episodes	42–45 min	Season 10 ongoing

=== Soap operas ===
Title	Genre	Premiere	Runtime	Status
General Hospital	Soap opera	April 1, 1963	36 min	Ongoing

=== Awards shows ===
- Academy Awards (1976)
- Country Music Association Awards (2006)
- ESPY Awards (2015)
- Rock and Roll Hall of Fame (2023)

=== Film presentations ===
- The Ten Commandments (1973; 2000)
- The Sound of Music (2002)
- ABC Saturday Movie of the Week (2004)
- The Wonderful World of Disney (2020)
- Home Alone (2022)
- The Santa Clause (2023)

=== News programming ===
- ABC World News Tonight (1948)
- Good Morning America (1975)
- 20/20 (1978)
- Nightline (1980)
- This Week (1981)
- Good Morning America First Look (1982)
- World News Now (1992)
- Good Morning America Weekend (1993–1999; 2004)
- GMA3 (2018)

=== Saturday mornings ===
- Outback Adventures with Tim Faulkner (2014–17, 2020)
- The Great Dr. Scott (2018–19, 2023)
- Hearts of Heroes (2019)
- Oh Baby! with Janai Norman (2019)
- Wildlife Nation with Jeff Corwin (2021)
- Jack Hanna's Passport (2024)
- The Champion's Edge with Bonnie Bernstein (2026)

=== Specials ===
- Santa Claus Is Comin' to Town (1970)
- Dick Clark's New Year's Rockin' Eve (1974)
- Disney Parks Christmas Day Parade (1983)
- Rose Parade (1989)
- CMA Fest (2004)
- Prep & Landing (2009)
- CMA Country Christmas (2010)
- Prep & Landing: Naughty vs. Nice (2011)
- Toy Story of Terror! (2013)
- Toy Story That Time Forgot (2014)
- The Wonderful World of Disney Holiday Spectacular (2016)
- Olaf's Frozen Adventure (2017)
- Endless Summer Vacation: Continued (Backyard Sessions) (2023)
- Jingle Ball (2023)
- Prep & Landing: The Snowball Protocol (2025)

=== ESPN programming ===
Professional football:

- National Football League (NFL)
  - Monday Night Football (shared with ESPN)
  - Wild Card Playoffs (simulcast on ESPN)
  - Divisional Playoffs (simulcast on ESPN)
  - Pro Bowl Games (simulcast on ESPN)
  - Super Bowl (in rotation with NBC, CBS, and Fox - simulcast on ESPN)
  - National Football League Draft
  - NFL Flag Championships
- United Football League (2024) (in rotation with Fox/FS1)

Professional basketball:

- National Basketball Association (NBA) coverage, including:
  - NBA Countdown
  - Inside the NBA (sublicensed by TNT Sports)
  - NBA Christmas Special (select games simulcast on ESPN)
  - NBA Saturday Primetime
  - NBA Sunday Showcase
  - Select playoff games
  - The NBA Finals
- Women's National Basketball Association (WNBA) coverage

Professional baseball

- Major League Baseball (MLB)
  - Select weekend games

Professional ice hockey:

- National Hockey League (NHL)
  - Select Saturday afternoon and night games (primarily doubleheaders)
  - NHL All-Star Game
  - NHL Stadium Series
  - Select Stanley Cup Playoffs games
  - Stanley Cup Final (even years, in rotation with TNT Sports)

College football:

- ESPN College Football on ABC, which includes:
  - Saturday Night Football
  - Saturday afternoon games featuring teams from the American, ACC, Big 12, and SEC
  - Select bowl games alternated with ESPN
  - College Football Playoff first round games (simulcast on ESPN)

Tennis:

- The Championships, Wimbledon
  - Ladies' and Gentlemen's Singles Finals (same-day replay, live coverage on ESPN)
- Indian Wells Masters

Auto racing:

- Formula One

Esports:

- Overwatch League

Misc:

- The X Games (Summer and Winter)
- The Little League World Series

=== Acquired programming ===
- Only Murders in the Building (2024)
- The Secret Lives of Mormon Wives (2025)
- Paradise (2025)

== Upcoming programming ==
=== Drama ===
Title	Genre	Premiere	Seasons	Runtime	Status
Untitled Grey's Anatomy spinoff	Medical drama	2027–28 season	TBA	TBA	Series order

=== Unscripted ===
==== Docuseries ====
Title	Genre	Premiere	Seasons	Runtime	Status
Michael Strahan's Iconic Music	Music	2027	TBA	TBA	Series order
Michael Strahan's Iconic Television	Television	2027	TBA	TBA	Series order

==== Reality ====
Title	Genre	Premiere	Seasons	Runtime	Status
Limited Time Offer	Reality competition	2026–27 season	TBA	TBA	Series order
Who's in the Band	Reality competition	2026–27 season	TBA	TBA	Series order

=== Awards shows ===
- Grammy Awards (2027)

=== ESPN programming ===
College football:

- College Football Playoff National Championship (2026–27 season)

=== Pilots ===
==== Comedy ====
- Rabbit

=== In development ===
==== Drama ====
- The Advocate
- Con Law
- Devil's Ranch
- Dive
- A Forgotten Kill
- Holding Court
- Killer Class
- The Naturalist
- Roman Law
- Under Pressure
- The Undertaker
- Untitled Ayesha Carr series
- Vital Signs

==== Comedy ====
- All's Fine/All Day
- The Dogwood
- Mittens
- The Ram
- Sisters-in-Law
