= Michael M. Scott =

American film director (born 1955)

Michael Scott
- Born: Michael M. Scott (born 1955)
- Education: Occidental College
- Occupations: Director; producer; documentary filmmaker
- Years active: 1983–present
- Known for: Dangerous Lies (2020 film); Cedar Cove; Trading Christmas; The Most Wonderful Time of the Year
- Relatives: Winston M. Scott (father)

Michael M. Scott (born 1955) is an American film director, producer and documentary filmmaker. He is best known as producer and film director for Dangerous Lies, Cedar Cove (2013), Trading Christmas (2011), The Most Wonderful Time of the Year (2008) and other films.

== Background ==
Michael M. Scott was raised in Mexico City, Mexico, the adopted son of Winston Scott, a U.S. intelligence officer, and Paula Maev Scott, a native of Ireland. His father, Winston M. Scott (Winston Mackinley Scott) worked for the CIA during the Cold War in Mexico. In 1970, Michael and his brother George were sent to Connecticut. From 1970 to 1973, Michael Scott was a student at Taft School, a preparatory private school in Watertown, Connecticut. Michael Scott is a graduate of the Occidental College.

== Filmmaking career ==
While still an undergraduate at Occidental College in 1975, Scott interviewed Clarence Carnes, an inmate who had done time on Alcatraz and was known to be the youngest inmate in the Federal prison. The interview resulted in documentary aired later on PBS. In 1980s, Scott began to work with Dave Bell Associates production company, where he produced HBO's "Decoys", a documentary about undercover police officers in New York City. Scott made his directorial and writing debut with 1983's One Man's Fight for Life – a story about a school teacher struggling with lung cancer.

Since 1983, Michael Scott has worked with a number of production and entertainment companies including Crown Media, Hallmark Channel, PBS, HBO, Netflix and more. Overall, Scott has over fifty credits as director and producer.

=== The Soul Collector (1999) ===
Scott's first Hallmark Hall of Fame fantasy is a romantic drama about an angel (Bruce Greenwood) who chooses life on Earth. Broadcast on CBS on 24 October 1999, the film placed in the weekly Nielsen top ten.

Lead actress Hilary Duff received the Young Artist Award for Best Supporting Young Actress the following spring.

=== The Most Wonderful Time of the Year (2008) ===
A Hallmark Channel original holiday rom-com starring Henry Winkler and Brooke Burns. Scott served as both director and executive producer. The Los Angeles Times later included the film in its three-star roster of perennial Christmas titles.

=== Cedar Cove (2013–2015) ===
Scott directed the two-hour pilot and served as producing director on all three seasons of Cedar Cove, Hallmark Channel's first original scripted series based on Debbie Macomber's movels. The series follows a story of Olivia Lockhart (played by Andie MacDowell), a Municipal Court judge in a quiet town in the Puget Sound.

=== Run for Your Life (2014) ===
In 2014, Scott directed Run for Your Life for Lifetime. The film is based on Katherine Kotaw's memoir Quicksand, which tells the story of Meredith (portrayed by Amy Smart), a woman who escapes from her abusive husband by fleeing Canada. She relocates to Seattle, but her former husband, who has since remarried, eventually tracks her down.

=== Dangerous Lies (2020) ===
In 2020, Scott directed Dangerous Lies, starring Camila Mendes and Jessie T. Usher. In October of the same year, the film was nominated for People's Choice Awards in the drama movie category. Scott's long-term relationship with writer David Golden resulted in the spec thriller being picked up as a Netflix Original.

In 2021, the film won the Non-Theatrical Feature Cinematography award at the Canadian Society of Cinematographers Awards.

=== Christmas Comes Twice (2020) ===
In December 2020, Scott returned to the Hallmark Channel to direct the time-travel holiday film Christmas Comes Twice, starring Tamera Mowry and Michael Xavier, which premiered as part of the network's "Countdown to Christmas" programming. The following year he directed Gingerbread Miracle, another Hallmark Christmas-themed film starring Merritt Patterson and Jon Ecker.

=== If I Run (2025) ===
In 2025, Scott directed an adaptation of Terri Blackstock's 2016 book If I Run for Lifetime Network starring Kat Graham.

== Michael Scott vs CIA ==
Scott's father, Winston M. Scott, wrote a manuscript about his life titled, "It Came To Little" which was confiscated by James Jesus Angleton, the CIA's counter intelligence chief, shortly after Winston Scott's death in 1971. The manuscript became the object of a Freedom of Information Act (FOIA) request that was denied, resulting in a lawsuit filed by Michael Scott (Scott vs CIA). A settlement with the CIA was reached in 1996. Later, Jefferson Morley, a veteran Washington journalist, collaborated with Scott and wrote "Our Man in Mexico", a biography of Winston M. Scott and CIA's operations in Mexico during the Cold War. According to Morley and Scott, John R. Horton, Winston M. Scott's immediate successor in Mexico City, removed several cartons of his papers within hours of Scott's death, including surveillance tapes and photographs of Lee Harvey Oswald made during his visits to the Soviet and Cuban embassies in late September 1963. The University of Texas findings confirm that "a tape recording of the voice of Lee Harvey Oswald" and related photos were among the items seized. Michael Scott contends that the CIA's continuing refusal to release this Oswald material impeded subsequent investigations and lay at the core of his FOIA suit against the Agency.

== Filmography ==
Year	Title	Credit	Notes
2025	If I Run	Director	(TV movie; Adaptation of the eponymous book by Terri Blackstock)
2021	Gingerbread Miracle	Director	(TV movie)
2020	Christmas Comes Twice	Director	(TV movie) (as Michael Scott)
2020	Dangerous Lies	Director/Producer	(TV movie) (as Michael Scott) (Nominated for People's Choice Awards)
2016	Second Sight	Director/Producer	(TV movie) (as Michael Scott)
2014	Heavenly Match	Director/Executive Producer	(TV movie) (as Michael Scott)
2014	Run for Your Life	Director	(TV movie) (as Michael Scott)
2014	Apple Mortgage Cake	Director/Producer	(TV movie)
2013	Cedar Cove	Director/Executive Producer	(TV Movie/2 hour series pilot)
2012	Hitched for the Holidays	Director//Executive Producer	(TV movie)
2011	Trading Christmas	Director/Executive Producer	(TV movie)
2008	The Most Wonderful Time of the Year	Director/Executive Producer	(TV movie)
2006	Murder on Pleasant Drive	Director/Co-executive Producer	(TV movie) (as Michael Scott)
2004	Deadly Visions	Director	TV movie
1999	The Soul Collector	Director	TV movie

== See also ==
- List of Hallmark Channel Original Movies
- List of Cedar Cove episodes
