= Audrey Pauley =

- The X-Files episode
- The strange hospital, floating in a void, in which Monica Reyes is trapped.
- Episode no.: Season 9 Episode 11
- Directed by: Kim Manners
- Written by: Steven Maeda
- Production code: 9ABX13
- Original air date: March 17, 2002
- Running time: 44 minutes

Guest appearances
- Stan Shaw as Stephen Murdoch; Tracey Ellis as Audrey Pauley; Jack Blessing as Dr. Jack Preijers; Del Zamora as Mr. Barreiro; Michele Harrell as Mrs. Murdoch; Vernee Watson-Johnson as Nurse Whitney Edwards; Esther “Tita” Mercado as Mrs. Barreiro; Cynthena Sanders as ER Nurse; Joe Nieves as Barreiro's Son; Ana Maria Lagasca as Barreiro's Daughter

Episode chronology
← Previous "Providence"	Next → "Underneath"
- The X-Files season 9

"Audrey Pauley" is the eleventh episode of the ninth season of the American science fiction television series The X-Files. It originally aired on the Fox network on March 17, 2002. It was written by Steven Maeda and directed by Kim Manners. The episode is a "monster-of-the-week" episode, a stand-alone plot which is unconnected to the mythology, or overarching fictional history, of The X-Files. The episode earned a Nielsen household rating of 4.8, being watched by 8 million viewers. It has generally received positive reviews from television critics.

The show centers on FBI special agents who work on cases linked to the paranormal, called X-Files; this season focuses on the investigations of John Doggett (Robert Patrick), Monica Reyes (Annabeth Gish), and Dana Scully (Gillian Anderson). In this episode, after being in a car accident, Reyes awakens in a surreal hospital. Doggett and a comatose Reyes struggle to prevent her organ donor card from being acted upon. The two, however, soon discover a unique woman, Audrey Pauley, who has the ability to communicate with both those conscious and unconscious.

"Audrey Pauley" guest starred Tracey Ellis as the title character; she had previously appeared as a major character in the third season episode "Oubliette". Gish has called the episode one of her favorites to film. In addition, it contained several elaborate stunts and effect sequences, many of which were created in unique manners.

== Plot ==
After driving home from work, Monica Reyes (Annabeth Gish) is struck by a drunk driver and transported to a hospital, where she is received by Dr. Preijers (Jack Blessing) and Nurse Edwards; she soon slips into a coma. Reyes, however, wakes up moments later in the same room all alone. Running to the door, she discovers that the hospital is floating in a void. She soon finds two other patients, Stephen Murdoch (Stan Shaw), and Mr. Barreiro (Del Zamora). They assume that they are dead. Reyes, however, maintains that they are still alive.

Meanwhile, Dana Scully (Gillian Anderson) tells John Doggett (Robert Patrick) that Reyes is braindead, a fact that Doggett refuses to believe. Preijers informs Doggett and Scully that, since Reyes was an organ donor, in a few days her life-support will be pulled and the hospital will harvest her remains. In the floating hospital, Reyes sees a woman (Tracey Ellis), standing in the hallway, whom Monica follows, but then the woman disappears. At that moment, Barreiro begins screaming and is engulfed in blue electricity before disappearing. In the real world, it is revealed that Barreiro, a fellow comatose patient, has had his life support removed by Preijers. Nearby stands the mystery woman that Reyes encountered: Audrey Pauley.

Doggett begins looking into ways to save Reyes, noting an anomaly in her electrocardiograph that suggests stifled brain activity. While visiting her room, Doggett runs into Audrey who tells him that Reyes' soul is "not gone yet". Audrey walks to her room in the basement, where a model of the hospital has been built. By concentrating her mind, she is able to move into the floating hospital where Reyes is trapped. Once there, she finds Reyes who asks her to tell Doggett that he's a "dog person", a reference to a conversation the two had before Reyes' crash. After relaying the message, Doggett is determined that Reyes is not gone and, following Audrey, learns about her hospital model.

Meanwhile, Nurse Edwards (Vernee Watson-Johnson) confronts Preijers about an injection she saw him give Reyes; he kills Edwards to cover his tracks. Later, in the floating hospital, Stephen collapses and disappears when he too is pulled off of life support. After Doggett is spotted with Audrey in the basement by Preijers, he begins to worry that she could expose what he is doing. He injects the same drug he used to kill Edwards, but Audrey is able to concentrate and move into the floating hospital one last time. She informs Reyes that her only way out is to jump into the void. Reyes does so and wakes up in her hospital bed moments before her organs are to be harvested. Doggett runs down to Audrey's room only to find that Preijers has killed her. Doggett manages to capture Preijers before he can escape.

== Production ==
"Audrey Pauley" was written by Steven Maeda and directed by Kim Manners. The entry was Maeda's second ninth season entry after "4-D". The episode features guest star Tracey Ellis as the titular Audrey Pauley. Ellis had previously appeared as a major character in the third season episode "Oubliette". Annabeth Gish later noted that the episode, along with "4-D", were her "two favorite episodes" because they "are stand-alone episodes about Reyes and Doggett. Wonderful acting challenges, and the stories were fantastic." Robert Patrick, whose friend Ted Demme had recently died, was worried about bringing too much emotion onto the set. He later noted, "I was kind of raw. I remember being a little worried about bringing too much emotion to it. I felt safe with Kim; he knew I was going through a tough time."

The episode contained several elaborate stunts and effect sequences. Gish performed all of her stunts in the episode, including one shot when she jumped from a thirty-foot descender. She later called the sequence "the biggest stunt of my career." For several of the special effect shots, Manners was forced to compromise on his original decision. For one shot, in which Audrey Pauley disappears after appearing in front of Gish, Manners had wanted to employ CGI technology. Eventually, the director decided to use practical effects by "t[ying] the two actresses [Gish and Ellis] together [...] and then [cutting] to Annabeth and in her face there's an 'oh shit' reaction, and then [panning] straight up on a crane, all right, and see that she's completely alone." He called effects like these "creative ways to trim [the] budget." To create the floating hospital scene, footage shot on a small door set was composited with a CGI hospital. Initially, the scene used a straight flat "piece of cement" as the bottom of the building. The effects team tried adding a "big piece of earth" under the building, but Paul Rabwin felt it looked too much like The Little Prince, so the piece of earth was removed. The final result also removed the cement-like base.

== Broadcast and reception ==
"Audrey Pauley" originally aired on the Fox network in the United States on March 17, 2002, and was first broadcast in the United Kingdom on BBC One on January 26, 2003. The episode's initial broadcast was viewed by approximately 5.1 million households, (Note: At the time of airing, the estimated number of households was 105.5 million. Thus, 4.8 percent of 105.5 million is 5.1 million households.) 8 million viewers, and ranked as the sixty-eighth most watched episode of television that aired during the week ending March 17. "Audrey Pauley" earned a Nielsen household rating of 4.8, meaning that roughly 4.8 percent of all television-equipped households, were tuned in to the episode.

The episode has generally received positive reviews from television critics. Robert Shearman and Lars Pearson, in their book Wanting to Believe: A Critical Guide to The X-Files, Millennium & The Lone Gunmen, gave the episode a glowing review and rated it five stars out of five. The two noted that "this is what The X-Files should be doing now" and that "this would have been the template on which to have built a series starring Doggett and Reyes." Furthermore, they noted that the script was "written and directed with so much restraint", that it makes many of the emotional scenes "more affecting". Shearman and Pearson ultimately called the end result "clever, thoughtful, […] very moving" and "beautiful". Lionel Green from Sand Mountain Reporter named the episode one of his "13 all-time favorite episodes" of The X-Files, ranking it at number three. He wrote that the episode was "powerful" due to its themes of "faith, love and sacrifice." He concluded that it was "the best one starring the new agents, Doggett and Reyes." M.A. Crang, in his book Denying the Truth: Revisiting The X-Files after 9/11, praised the performances of Robert Patrick and Annabeth Gish while stating that the visuals in the dream sequences were "pitch-perfect". Alanna Reid of The Companion wrote that "Reyes' cognisance of her own reincarnated status, her ability to sense the embodiment of evil and comprehend the journey of her own soul between life and death is the mark of a powerful mystic; allowing the show to ... build and play out narratives that would seem more at home in Buffy the Vampire Slayer or Charmed than The X-Files."

Jessica Morgan, however, from Television Without Pity, gave the episode a more mixed review. She criticized the character of Monica Reyes and called her "Moronica". She ultimately gave the episode a C+ grade. Jeffrey Robinson from DVD Talk called the entry "borderline weird" and used it as evidence that "the ninth season [is] arguably the worst season of the series." The A.V. Club's Zack Handlen was generally unenthused writing "It’s not a bad episode, exactly, but there doesn’t seem to be a lot of point to it. ... it makes for a forgettable hour."

== Bibliography ==
- Fraga, Erica (2010). LAX-Files: Behind the Scenes with the Los Angeles Cast and Crew. CreateSpace. ISBN 9781451503418.
- Hurwitz, Matt; Knowles, Chris (2008). The Complete X-Files. Insight Editions. ISBN 978-1933784809.
- Kessenich, Tom (2002). Examination: An Unauthorized Look at Seasons 6–9 of the X-Files. Trafford Publishing. ISBN 1553698126.
- Shearman, Robert; Pearson, Lars (2009). Wanting to Believe: A Critical Guide to The X-Files, Millennium & The Lone Gunmen. Mad Norwegian Press. ISBN 978-0975944691.
