= Dangerous Lies =

Dangerous Lies may refer to:

- Dangerous Lies (1921 film), a British silent drama film
- Dangerous Lies (2020 film), an American thriller film
