= Deceptions =

1990 television film

- Genre: Drama
- Written by: Ken Denbow; Richard Taylor
- Directed by: Ruben Preuss
- Starring: Harry Hamlin; Robert Davi; Nicollette Sheridan; Marshall Colt; Kevin King
- Theme music composer: Gary S. Scott
- Country of origin: United States
- Original language: English

Production
- Executive producers: Ruben Preuss; Miguel Tejada-Flores
- Producer: Guy J. Louthan
- Production location: Los Angeles
- Cinematography: Zoran Hochstatter
- Editor: Rozanne Zingale
- Running time: 95 minutes
- Production companies: Alpha Entertainment; Showtime Networks

Original release
- Network: Showtime
- Release: June 10, 1990

Deceptions is a 1990 erotic drama film starring Nicollette Sheridan, Harry Hamlin and Robert Davi. It was directed by Ruben Preuss and written by Ken Denbow and Richard Taylor. The film received a nomination for a CableACE Award for "best international dramatic special or movie. AllRovi reviewer Linda Rasmussen called the film, "a remarkably predictable, non-erotic thriller with little to recommend it".

== Plot ==
A homicide cop falls for a beautiful suspect. When wealthy socialite Adrienne kills her husband Douglas, she claims self-defense. Nick, the cop assigned to the case is suspicious but becomes obsessed with the sensual young woman.

== Cast ==
- Harry Hamlin as Nick Gentry
- Robert Davi as Jack 'Harley' Kessler
- Nicollette Sheridan as Adrienne Erickson
- Marshall Colt as Douglas Erickson
- Kevin King as Marta / Paul Basque
- Ben Mittleman as Lester Fenady
- James Andronica as Car salesman (as Jimmy Andronica)
- Bill Dunham as Fat cop
- John Levinson as Scotti
- Annie Waterman as Theater manager
- Dave Nicolson as Pharmacist
- Joseph Hardin as Driller
- Jack Behr as Det. Feldman
- Craig Cavanah as Policeman #1
- Nigel Gibbs as Policeman #2
- Fred Walentynowicz as Policeman #3
- Audri Phillips as Sketch artist
- Shawne Zarubica as Piano player
- Victoria Hemingson as Sandwich girl
- Timothy Olague as Venice Beach Surfer (uncredited)

== Sequel ==
The film was followed by a 1994 sequel titled Deceptions II: Edge of Deception.
