= Charlie Craig (screenwriter) =

American television producer and writer

Charles Grant Craig
- Occupations: Television writer and producer
- Writing career
- Notable work: The X-Files

Charles Grant Craig (sometimes credited as Charlie Craig) is an American television producer and writer. He worked on the third season of supernatural drama series The X-Files. The season was nominated for the Emmy Award for outstanding drama series.

== Career ==
Craig joined the crew of The X-Files as a supervising producer and writer for the third season in 1995. The X-Files was created by Chris Carter and focuses on a pair of FBI agents investigating cases with links to the paranormal. At the 1996 ceremony, the production team was nominated for the Primetime Emmy Award for Outstanding Drama Series for their work on the third season. Craig left the crew after working on only eight episodes. He wrote the episode "Oubliette".

Some of Craig's other television credits include Booker, The Hat Squad, The New Alfred Hitchcock Presents, Renegade, Invasion, Eureka, and Pretty Little Liars.

Craig teaches at the UCLA Extension, Writers Program.
