= Hot in Cleveland season 2 =

Hot in Cleveland
- Season 2
- DVD cover
- No. of episodes: 22

Release
- Original network: TV Land
- Original release: January 19 – August 31, 2011

Season chronology
- ← Previous; Season 1 Next → Season 3

The second season of the TV Land original sitcom Hot in Cleveland premiered on January 19 and ended on August 31, 2011. Twenty episodes were initially ordered, but the order was later extended to 22 episodes. The series stars Valerie Bertinelli, Wendie Malick, Jane Leeves, and Betty White.

After being on hiatus since March 23, 2011, Hot in Cleveland returned on June 15, 2011, to air the remaining 12 episodes of season 2 ending on August 31, 2011.

== Plot ==
The second season picks up 24 hours after the storm and Elka's arrest on hiding stolen property. While in jail, Elka reveals that her late husband was involved with a crime family after she recognizes a fellow inmate named Diane. But that isn't the only revelation coming from Elka, for it turns out that she also had a tryst with Rick, the neighbor and The Plain Dealer columnist who tried to seduce Melanie in the first season. In addition, Max's son is running for political office and Elka realises that dating Max could affect his chances because he doesn't want the publicity, so she breaks up with Max. Because of these events, Elka could face more legal problems, prompting her lawyer to suggest that she be declared incompetent so she won't stand trial, which proves to be a disaster because her lawyer becomes a chick magnet for Melanie, Joy and Victoria. Max dates and prepares to marry another woman, but Elka fights back and both Elka and Max became a couple again. However, Elka's romantic problems take on a lot more problems when Max decides to leave for Florida and asks her to come with him. After deliberating on it, she agrees, but when she sees his shrine to his late wife, she concludes that Max is not ready to marry again and consequently breaks things off with him for good, returning home to face her trial with the support of the girls. She is later found guilty and flees the house to avoid her sentencing, leaving a goodbye note for the girls.

Meanwhile, Joy learns that her son has decided to not see her just yet, but that's the least of her problems: She just learned that the INS plans to deport her back to England, so she must find a way to get a green card... which is where Rick comes in. Although she does accept his offer of "marriage" (knowing that Rick still plans to be a "player"), this unusual relationship and Rick's plan to use this ruse to bed other women would be ruined when Rick tried to smooth talk their immigration lawyer. On top of that, she tells Elka after being arrested by Pete for taking money in a rummage sale drug deal (she sold a guy Victoria's "chill pills") that she was a shoplifter as a teenager. Her love life also takes a weird turn when she finds out a guy she thought was into her really just wants Joy to babysit his son while he dates a different woman, which gives Joy the idea of wanting to have another child. She also had a past relationship with actor Michael E. Knight, whom she despises because he never called after a one-night stand she had with him. This revelation and the fake wedding could also mean more problems for the eyebrow specialist and her attempts to stay in the United States. But thanks to a last-minute deal from the governor's wife, oddly after she accused Joy of being a hooker during Elka's trial, Joy is given a green card to stay in the country, and negotiates for Elka to be cleared of all charges as well once she is brought home from masquerading as a nun in the west.

During a panic situation where the girls are scared about a criminal whom Victoria wooed under Joy's name possibly breaking into their house, Joy accidentally shoots a man by tossing Elka's gun; which is loaded and instantly shoots the leg of the man, who turns out to be her long-lost son, Owen, to whom she reluctantly introduces herself. At first, Owen wants nothing to do with Joy based on her crazy life, but he eventually relents and the two build up a mother-son relationship. As Joy mulls over her options to conceive at a fertility clinic, she ends up having casual sex with Rick, who turns out to be a sperm donor at the clinic. When Melanie finds out about this, she urges Joy to end it with Rick.

Melanie, on the other hand, can't forgive her cop-boyfriend Pete for arresting Elka, but the two do kiss and make up, although his mother has made it known that she does not like Melanie. To add insult to injury, Melanie also finds out that Hank, the married plumber she met back in the first season, is Pete's older brother and still has feelings for her. Elka blurts out information on Melanie's past exploits with Hank at a bar, which simultaneously ends Melanie's relationship with Pete while costing Hank his marriage after his wife witnessed it all. She later finds another guy, a doctor named Aaron. In addition, Melanie visits her home in Los Angeles as it is locked up in legal limbo, and pines for the good days she and her family had in that residence. She is finally able to sell the home while realizing she must move on.

Financial problems are also taking a toll on Victoria, who has just learned that her financial advisor was arrested on embezzlement charges and as a result, is now broke and has her assets frozen, leaving her trying to get herself out of debt and hopefully keep her sanity. An example of that comes when she shows up at a bar with a very old billionaire, but he collapses during their first night out and demands to be taken home. In addition, she learns at a movie audition that she will be playing Melanie Griffith's mother, which results in the two having a cat fight (that is caught on tape), and later manages to land a job on All My Children alongside rival actress Susan Lucci in the wake of Victoria winning a Daytime Emmy award over Lucci in the first season. Unfortunately, Lucci seeks revenge by screwing with Victoria during their scenes together, which is thwarted by Joy threatening to sue the producers. She finally lands a regular job as a feature reporter at a local news station, despite the role initially being a bad fit for her.

Whilst discussing hooking up with friends with no strings attached, Elka starts a casual fling with an old friend, Fred, but she falls in love with him as the relationship quickly becomes serious and decides to propose to him. She changes her mind, but when Fred falls down a well and is subsequently rescued, he then asks Elka to marry him. The season finale revolves around Elka trying to find a sign from her late husband that it is okay to marry Fred, while Joy and Victoria learn that they married each other in Canada during an alcohol-induced stupor on the night of Elka's bachelorette party. But on the day of the wedding, Elka is shocked when not only Max arrives to stop the wedding, but also another man named Bobby proclaims that neither Max nor Fred can marry her, as he is her "dead" husband, leaving the season on a cliffhanger.

== Cast ==
=== Main ===
- Valerie Bertinelli as Melanie Moretti
- Jane Leeves as Rejoyla "Joy" Scroggs
- Wendie Malick as Victoria Chase
- Betty White as Elka Ostrovsky

=== Recurring ===
- David Starzyk as Pete
- Wayne Knight as Rick
- Carl Reiner as Max
- Buck Henry as Fred

=== Special guest stars ===
- Mary Tyler Moore as Diane
- Bonnie Franklin as Agnieszka
- John Schneider as Hank
- Sherri Shepherd as Judge Lesser
- Melanie Griffith as herself
- Jack Wagner as Dr. Aaron Everett
- Susan Lucci as herself
- Michael E. Knight as himself
- Jimmy Kimmel as himself
- Peri Gilpin as Taylor
- Darnell Williams as himself
- Charlie Adler as Director
- Jon Lovitz as Artie, the Opera Guy
- Amy Sedaris as Heather
- George Wendt as Yoder
- Monica Horan as Sarah
- John Mahoney as Roy
- Steve Lawrence as Jack
- Doris Roberts as Lydia
- Jennifer Love Hewitt as Emmy Chase
- Huey Lewis as Johnny Revere
- Cedric the Entertainer as Reverend Boyce
- Don Rickles as Bobby

=== Guest stars ===
- Charlie Adler as Director
- Janet Varney as Ellen
- Julie Lancaste as Linda
- Robert Towers as Winston
- Mark Deklin as Kirk Stark
- Millicent Martin as Agnes Bratford
- Leslie Grossman as Elise
- Max Greenfield as Steve
- John Ducey as Gordon
- Arden Myrin as Jasmine Breeze
- Isaiah Mustafa as Kevin
- Dan Bakkedahl as Jasper
- Gregory Harrison as Dave
- Mandy June Turpin as Doreen
- Caitlin Carmichael as Annabelle
- Stephen Dunham as Abner
- Mark Derwin as Gary
- Michael McMillian as Owen
- Frank Caliendo as Kenny
- Patrick Fabian as Richard
- Richard Burgi as Timothy
- Tom McGowan as Robert
- Mindy Cohn as Cassie
- Antonio Sabato Jr. as Leandro
- Lex Medlin as Elliot
- Michael Dunn as Matthew
- Mason Cook as Austin
- James Patrick Stuart as Colin Cooper
- George Newbern as Bill
- Bart Johnson as Mark
- Shelli Boone as Lori

== Production ==
On July 7, 2010, TV Land announced that the show was renewed for a second season, which began production of 20 episodes on November 1, 2010. The new season premiered on January 19, 2011, and had a mid-season finale on March 23, 2011. The second half of the season, consisting of 10 episodes began airing on June 22, 2011. On May 16, 2011, it was announced that two more episodes were then added to the season, bringing the season 2 episode order to 22 episodes.

Mary Tyler Moore guest starred in the season opener, in which her character is somewhat connected with Elka in the wake of the latter's arrest in the first-season finale. This marked the first time since 1977 that both White and Moore worked together since The Mary Tyler Moore Show ended its run on CBS. Sherri Shepherd appeared as the judge in Elka's competency case. Melanie Griffith, Jack Wagner, Bonnie Franklin and Janet Varney also guest starred, Franklin reuniting with One Day at a Time co-star Valerie Bertinelli. John Schneider, David Starzyk, Carl Reiner and Wayne Knight also reprised their roles this season.

The guest stars for the second half of season two are: Buck Henry, Dick Van Patten, John Mahoney (reuniting with Frasier co-star Jane Leeves), Doris Roberts, Jennifer Love Hewitt, George Wendt, Mindy Cohn, Richard Burgi, Antonio Sabàto Jr. and Michael McMillian. Amy Sedaris and Huey Lewis also reprised their roles from previous episodes.

== Release ==
Region 2 released Part 1 of the second season on August 31, 2011, Part 1 features the first 10 episodes of the season. Part 2 which features the rest of the 12 episodes was scheduled to be released on DVD on November 19, 2012, along with a Complete Season 2 box-set with all episodes of Season 2 released on the same date, but got delayed to December 31, 2012, and then again to February 25, 2013.

== Reception ==
On the review aggregator website Rotten Tomatoes, 80% of 5 critics' reviews are positive.

== Episodes ==
No. overall	No. in season	Title	Directed by	Written by	Original release date	Prod. code	U.S. viewers (millions)
11	1	"Free Elka"	David Trainer	Suzanne Martin	January 19, 2011	201	2.95
Elka meets up with an old friend (Mary Tyler Moore) while she is in prison and Melanie, Joy and Victoria hold a fundraiser to raise the money to pay her bail. Meanwhile, Joy receives a letter from the INS and is forced to get engaged to Rick (Wayne Knight) to avoid deportation. Victoria loses all her money when her financial advisor is imprisoned. Melanie and Pete (David Starzyk) profess their love for each other. Note: After being nominated for Outstanding Leading Actress in a Comedy Series, Betty White submitted this episode to judges for Emmy consideration.
12	2	"Bad Bromance"	David Trainer	Sam Johnson & Chris Marcil	January 26, 2011	202	2.30
Melanie begins to question if her relationship is right for her when she meets Pete's family, gets off on the wrong foot with his mother (Bonnie Franklin), and comes face to face with Pete's older brother... Hank (John Schneider), who hit on her in Season 1. Meanwhile, Joy attempts a scam so she can get a green card, but Rick wants to romance their immigration lawyer. Victoria starts dating an older billionaire, who looks like he's already met his maker.
13	3	"Hot for the Lawyer"	David Trainer	Steve Joe	February 2, 2011	204	2.36
The girls compete for the affection of Elka's handsome lawyer (Mark Deklin). Elka must convince a judge (Sherri Shepherd) she is senile to avoid trial all while dealing with Max (Carl Reiner) announcing he will marry his new girlfriend, Agnes (Millicent Martin).
14	4	"Sisterhood of the Traveling SPANX"	David Trainer	Rachel Sweet	February 9, 2011	203	2.11
A pair of black Spandex pants are tied into Victoria fighting with Melanie Griffith during a movie audition, Melanie attempting to date a doctor, and a younger guy, who Joy was hoping to date, asking Joy to babysit his son instead.
15	5	"I Love Lucci, Part 1"	Andy Cadiff	Chuck Ranberg & Anne Flett-Giordano	February 16, 2011	205	1.92
The girls head back to Los Angeles when Victoria books a part on All My Children, so Melanie uses the opportunity to sell her old house. But the visit has Melanie reliving the past, Joy trying to jog Michael E. Knight's memory of their past encounter, Victoria scheming to get even with Susan Lucci after she makes changes to her scripts and Elka seeking out Robert Redford. Jimmy Kimmel and Leeves' former Frasier co-star Peri Gilpin guest star. Note: The title fonts read Hot in Cleveland In L.A. for this episode and serves as a crossover with All My Children, which featured Malick in the February 24, 2011 airing.
16	6	"I Love Lucci, Part 2"	Andy Cadiff	Chuck Ranberg & Anne Flett-Giordano	February 23, 2011	206	1.71
While the girls are in Los Angeles, Elka runs off to find the movie star of her dreams, Robert Redford. Meanwhile, Susan Lucci resorts to Erica Kane-type tactics by screwing with Victoria's scenes, Michael E. Knight toys with Joy's feelings, and Melanie is still trying to let go of her feelings for her old home. Note: The second episode to feature the Hot in Cleveland In L.A. title fonts.
17	7	"Dog Tricks, Sex Flicks & Joy's Fix"	Andy Cadiff	Eric Zicklin	March 2, 2011	207	1.96
Victoria tries to talk Melanie into making a sex tape with her to jump-start her career. Meanwhile, while waiting for her therapy appointment, Joy meets a man named Gordon (John Ducey) with whom she is "screwed up in complementary ways", but risks losing him when she steals his files from their therapist's office. Elka rescues a dog from the shelter, called "Dummy" by the shelter workers, and she becomes exasperated when he can't learn any tricks.
18	8	"LeBron is Le Gone"	Andy Cadiff	Steve Joe	March 9, 2011	208	1.93
Joy meets a singing homeless man (Jon Lovitz) who agrees to marry her so she can stay in the country. Elka gives Melanie tips on basketball when she begins dating the shooting coach (Isaiah Mustafa) for the Cleveland Cavaliers. Victoria gets a job as a local news reporter.
19	9	"Elka's Snowbird"	David Trainer	Steve Skrovan	March 16, 2011	209	1.56
Max, Elka's on-again-off-again beau, tries to convince her to move with him to Florida. Meanwhile, Victoria falls hard for a new man (Gregory Harrison) that she meets during an "Oh Hi, Ohio" interview, but she must contend with his two young children. Melanie and Joy agree to do volunteer work at a retirement home.
20	10	"Law & Elka"	David Trainer	Sam Johnson & Chris Marcil	March 23, 2011	210	1.80
When the trial begins, Elka is guilty and runs off out West. Meanwhile, Joy is rumored to be a hooker for the governor of Ohio, and Victoria tries to convince Joy to go on "Oh, Hi, Ohio" and lie to the viewers, telling them that she really is a hooker.
21	11	"Where's Elka?"	Andy Cadiff	Suzanne Martin	June 15, 2011	211	2.39
The girls go to an Amish town to find Elka. Meanwhile, Victoria finds herself acclimating well with the other women in the town.
22	12	"How I Met My Mother"	Andy Cadiff	Steve Joe	June 22, 2011	212	1.97
Joy finally meets her biological son, Owen (Michael McMillian) after accidentally shooting him with an old pellet gun. The girls fear for their lives when an ex-convict (Mark Derwin), that Victoria has kept in contact with has recently been released from prison. Elka tries to teach her untalented dog tricks for her church's "Bible Stories As Told By Animals" sermon. Note: After being introduced in the seventh episode this season, "Dog Tricks, Sex Flicks & Joy's Fix", Elka's dog, "Dummy", is renamed to "Chance".
23	13	"Unseparated at Birthdates"	Andy Cadiff	Rachel Sweet	June 29, 2011	215	2.29
The women set each other up on blind dates for their "fake" birthdays. Their plans backfire when Victoria goes out with a nice guy (Richard Burgi), but finds out he has a conjoined twin brother (Patrick Fabian). Melanie goes out with a guy that resembles Jesus (Vincent Ventresca) and gets so nervous that she makes holy jokes. Joy dates a guy (Frank Caliendo) who is brutally boring, except when he does celebrity impersonations such as Robert De Niro, Sean Connery and William Shatner. Elka goes out with a rich fellow (Steve Lawrence), but discovers he only likes her because she acted stupid. The waiter (John Mahoney) tries to help with the dates, but it turns out that he was ruining them and winds up going out with Elka, revealing the truth about Melanie's date, and breaking up Joy's date by setting him up with somebody else. The episode ends with everybody relaxing and having fun...until the second conjoined twin who was flirting with Joy ends up in trouble with his wife.
24	14	"Battle of the Bands"	Andy Cadiff	Steve Skrovan	July 6, 2011	214	2.25
The girls join a battle of the bands contest, but when Joy leaves to be the lead singer of Rick's band, the girls are left having to use Auto-Tune microphones.
25	15	"Love Thy Neighbor"	Andy Cadiff	Sam Johnson & Chris Marcil	July 13, 2011	216	2.00
Eager to have another child, Joy begins having casual sex with Rick, while Melanie thinks that Joy is on drugs. Meanwhile, Victoria gets advice from Elka about playing an elderly woman for a stage musical adaption of Driving Miss Daisy to impress the director (Tom McGowan) who already turned her down.
26	16	"Dancing Queens"	Andy Cadiff	Eric Zicklin	July 20, 2011	213	2.44
The girls visit a gay bar to find male gay best friends. Victoria flirts with an attractive patron (Antonio Sabàto Jr.) who mistakes her for a drag queen dressed as herself to enter a celebrity drag queen contest. Elka reunites with an old friend (Doris Roberts) with whom she had a falling out years ago.
27	17	"The Emmy Show"	David Trainer	Steve Joe	July 27, 2011	221	1.84
Victoria's daughter Emmy (Jennifer Love Hewitt) visits, revealing that she's writing a tell-all book about how Victoria has been a bad mother to her. Meanwhile, Melanie and Joy compete with another woman to date a boy's father, à la The Bachelor.
28	18	"Arch Enemies"	David Trainer	Rachel Sweet	August 3, 2011	222	1.88
To get revenge on a coworker Colin Cooper (James Patrick Stuart), Victoria has Joy go out with him so that she can dump him later. However, her plan backfires when Joy develops genuine feelings for him. Also, Melanie reconnects with Bill (George Newbern), a blind date from season 1, who turns out to have an odd obsession with her feet.
29	19	"Too Hot for TV"	N/A	N/A	August 10, 2011	218	2.03
The Hot in Cleveland cast looks back on bloopers and other funny moments from season 2.
30	20	"Indecent Proposals"	Andy Cadiff	Chuck Ranberg & Anne Flett-Giordano	August 17, 2011	217	1.77
In the style of Sex and the City, Melanie writes a piece on her Woman's Day column about women having a casual sex relationship with men, with the girls testing the theory. Victoria's old flame Johnny Revere (Huey Lewis) returns to town and has a heart attack right before he is about to make love to her. Elka begins a sexual relationship with her long-time poker buddy Fred (Buck Henry) which leads to a marriage proposal.
31	21	"Bridezelka"	Andy Cadiff	Suzanne Martin	August 24, 2011	219	1.98
When Elka begins to feel that she's too old to get married, she and Fred meet with Reverend Boyce (Cedric the Entertainer), an R&B singer turned minister, who counsels them. After getting advice from the girls, she turns to planning an elaborate wedding in an attempt to draw the attention away from her. With Elka finding everything unsatisfactory, the girls fear she has turned into a bridezilla, and dub her "Bridezelka". Meanwhile, Victoria models a new Ladypants product that eliminates water from the body.
32	22	"Elka's Wedding"	David Trainer	Eric Zicklin	August 31, 2011	220	2.44
In this parody episode of the comedy film The Hangover, the girls wake up to find Victoria and Joy with big hair, Melanie duct-taped to the wall, and the house trashed. Joy and Victoria find out that they both got married the night before. During their search for Elka, who is looking for a sign from her dead husband that it's okay to marry Fred, they also try to find their own husbands. Clues in the bar help Joy and Victoria remember that they went to Canada with the touring cast of Hairspray, which explains their hair at the beginning of the episode. Melanie discovers she started (and won) a wet T-shirt contest at the bar. They find Elka and get to the wedding, where Joy and Victoria now realize they married each other. At the wedding ceremony, several men that know Elka stand up and ask her to marry them. The season ends with a cliffhanger, when Max shows up and tells Elka he made a mistake leaving her, and not to marry Fred. Then a stranger (Don Rickles) rushes in and yells, "She's not going to marry any of you losers! She's already married to me!" Elka explains to Melanie that he is her "dead" husband.
