= Deadly Visions =

- Written by: John Murlowski
- Directed by: Michael Scott
- Starring: Nicollette Sheridan; Gordon Currie; Sarah Deakins
- Theme music composer: Sophia Morizet
- Country of origin: United States
- Original language: English

Production
- Producer: Harvey Kahn
- Cinematography: Adam Sliwinski
- Running time: 90 minutes
- Production companies: West Coast Pictures; Front Street Pictures; Transplant Productions

Original release
- Release: October 18, 2004

Deadly Visions is a 2004 made-for-television film starring Nicollette Sheridan, Gordon Currie, Sarah Deakins, Philip Granger, Haili Page and Frida Betrani. It was directed by Michael Scott and written by John Murlowski.

The film is also known as Possessed (the USA DVD title) and Transplant (the Canadian working title).

== Synopsis ==
A woman (Nicollette Sheridan) who underwent an eye transplant is haunted by visions of her donor's last moments of life, and she is convinced that the woman was murdered.
