= Murder in My Mind (film) =

- Genre: Science fiction; Crime drama
- Written by: Tom Swale
- Directed by: Robert Iscove
- Starring: Nicollette Sheridan; Peter Coyote; Stacy Keach; Peter Outerbridge
- Theme music composer: Michel Colombier
- Country of origin: United States
- Original language: English

Production
- Executive producer: Judy Palnick
- Producer: George W. Perkins
- Cinematography: Jan Kiesser
- Editor: Susan B. Browdy
- Running time: 88 minutes
- Production companies: Judy Palnick Productions; CBS Productions

Original release
- Network: CBS
- Release: February 19, 1997

Murder in My Mind is a 1997 science fiction crime drama television film directed by Robert Iscove and starring Nicollette Sheridan, Stacy Keach, Peter Outerbridge, Peter Coyote, Ian Tracey and Peter Flemming. It was written by Tom Swale. The film premiered on CBS on February 19, 1997.

== Plot ==
When a serial killer preys on blondes, a blonde federal law enforcement officer investigating the case decides to take a drastic step. Her husband, a scientist experimenting only on lab animals, transplants brain cells from a comatose patient into the agent's brain, hoping it will stimulate memories that will help her find the killer.

== Cast ==
- Nicollette Sheridan as FBI Agent Pearson
- Peter Coyote as Lefcoat
- Stacy Keach as Cargill
- Peter Outerbridge as Belinas
