= Dirty Tennis =

- VHS cover art
- Directed by: Jonathan Baker; George J. Bloom
- Written by: James Van Patten
- Produced by: Jonathan Baker; Kristy McNichol; Patty Jackson
- Starring: Dick Van Patten; Bruce Jenner; Nicollette Sheridan; Pat Van Patten; Vince Van Patten; Jimmy Van Patten; Nels Van Patten
- Production companies: Baker Entertainment Group; CCR Productions
- Distributed by: MCA Home Video
- Release date: November 5, 1989 (VHS)
- Running time: 33 minutes
- Country: United States
- Language: English

Dirty Tennis is a 1989 short comedy parody video about tennis instructional videos. It stars Dick Van Patten, Caitlyn Jenner (Note: Credited as "Bruce Jenner"; she transitioned in 2015.) and Nicollette Sheridan. It was written by James Van Patten and directed by Jonathan Baker and George J. Bloom. The short comedy was released on VHS in 1989.

As part of Dick Van Patton's post-Eight is Enough popularity, it was written by Van Patton's son Jimmy to depict in a comedic fashion how Dick is able to defeat a skilled opponent in a tennis game by using poor sportsmanship cheats.

== Plot ==
In a parody of tennis instructional videos, Dick Van Patten takes on the role of an unscrupulous tennis player whose only interest is to beat opponent Caitlyn Jenner (appearing as "Bruce Jenner", before her transition) in any manner possible, including interruptions caused by his using a sexy Nicollette Sheridan as a secret weapon of distraction.

== Cast ==
- Dick Van Patten as himself
- Caitlyn Jenner as Bruce Jenner
- Nicollette Sheridan as herself
- Pat Van Patten as herself
- Vince Van Patten as himself
- Jimmy Van Patten as himself
- Nels Van Patten as himself

== Reception ==
Star-News wrote, "This 33 minute assault on uppity tennis etiquette is Jenner and Van Patten's answer to Tim Conway's Dorf on Golf attack on golf course snobbery". Of her participation as co-producer, actress Kristy McNichol described it as a "hilarious video about all the dirty little tricks you can play on your partner to win", stated the short had "done very well in the market", and shared that producing it "was a lot of fun."

The Philadelphia Inquirer shared that Dick Van Patten as a "self-described tennis hacker" and Bruce Jenner as a "dashing Olympic-class athlete" would seem unlikely as a comic duo. They expanded that the teaming of the two such unlikely men "in this parody of a how-to program works wonderfully," and "not solely because of the contrast in their ages and conditioning." Van Patten as a mischievous bad fellow plays well "against his nice-guy image" and causes Jenner to turn "his public persona upside-down" by being unafraid in acting "like a chump, preening in his sparkling tennis togs one moment and pitching a spoiled-brat tantrum the next." Praising the film overall, they concluded "Suffice it to say that in the small universe of comedy tapes that have been made expressly for home video, Van Patten has come up with a winner. And although Jenner may have lost on the court, he's bound to win new respect for his abilities as a clown."

The Washington Post called Dirty Tennis "Dick Van Patten's Spinal Tap", and wrote the film stood as "a towering monument to the 1980s VHS era" when "mid-level celebrities could rent a camcorder, cobble together 60 minutes of junk video, splice it all together and ship it off to consumers who were starving to rent something – anything – they could jam into their VCRs."

The Chicago Sun-Times gave the film three stars, and wrote "Dirty Tennis adds up to 33 minutes of malicious enjoyment, [it] is downright nasty – and therefore thoroughly delightful".
