= Nicollette Sheridan =

English-American actress (born 1963)

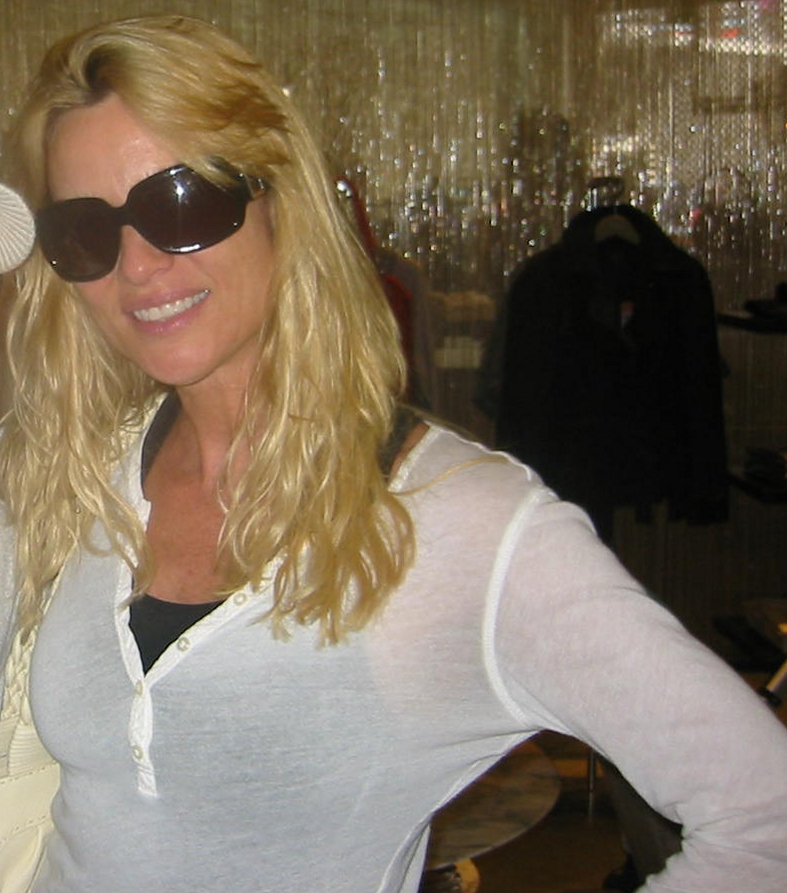
- Sheridan in 2008
- Born: 21 November 1963 (age 62); Worthing, Sussex, England
- Citizenship: United Kingdom; United States
- Occupation: Actress
- Years active: 1984–present
- Spouses: Harry Hamlin (m. 1991; div. 1992) Aaron Phypers (m. 2015; div. 2018)
- Partners: Michael Bolton (1992–1995, 2005–2008); Nicklas Söderblom (2004–2005)

Nicollette Sheridan (born 21 November 1963) is an English-American actress. She began her career as a fashion model before landing a role in the short-lived ABC primetime soap opera Paper Dolls in 1984, as well as starring in the romantic comedy film The Sure Thing (1985). She rose to prominence as Paige Matheson on the CBS primetime soap opera Knots Landing (1986–1993), for which she received two Soap Opera Digest Awards. Thereafter, Sheridan appeared in lead roles in numerous television films and miniseries, including Lucky Chances (1990), Virus (1995), and The People Next Door (1996). She also appeared in the feature films Noises Off (1992), Spy Hard (1996), Beverly Hills Ninja (1997), and Code Name: The Cleaner (2007).

From 2004 to 2009, Sheridan starred as Edie Britt on the ABC television series Desperate Housewives, for which she was nominated for the Golden Globe Award for Best Supporting Actress – Series, Miniseries or Television Film in 2005. From 2018 to 2019, she portrayed Alexis Carrington on The CW's Dynasty reboot.

== Early life ==
Sheridan was born in Worthing, England, the daughter of actress Sally Adams (born 1947, Bognor Regis, West Sussex, United Kingdom), who gave birth to her at age 16. When Sheridan was less than a year old, her father left the family, and she has not seen him since.

In 1969, her mother Sally (billed as Dani Sheridan) was featured in the James Bond film On Her Majesty's Secret Service as one of Blofeld's "Angels of Death". On the shoot, Sally met the actor playing Blofeld, Telly Savalas, who eventually became her de facto husband and Sheridan's stepfather. Sally became known as Sally Savalas.

Sheridan emigrated to the United States from the United Kingdom in 1973, when she was 10 years old.

== Career ==
=== Early works and Knots Landing ===
Sheridan began her career as a fashion model, appearing in the pages of Vogue and on the cover of Cosmopolitan, shot by Francesco Scavullo. Whilst still a teenager, she famously starred in a Martini TV commercial, delivering the beverage through the streets of LA on roller skates. In 1984, she made her acting debut in the short-lived ABC primetime soap opera Paper Dolls. The series was cancelled after half a season, and the following year, Sheridan starred in the romantic comedy film The Sure Thing. Later that year, she was cast in the pilot for another ABC primetime soap, Dark Mansions, intended to be a cross between Dynasty and Dark Shadows. The project did not go to series, but the pilot episode was aired as a television movie in 1986.

In 1986, Sheridan joined the cast of the CBS primetime soap opera Knots Landing as vixen Paige Matheson. She started in a recurring role, but had become a series regular by the 1988–89 season. Sheridan remained with the series for seven seasons until its end in 1993. For her performance in the role, she won the 1990 Soap Opera Digest award for Outstanding Lead Actress: Prime Time, and the 1991 Soap Opera Digest award for Outstanding Heroine: Prime Time. The same year, she was named one of People's "50 Most Beautiful People".

In the 1990s, Sheridan starred in a number of television movies. In 1990, she starred in Deceptions and played Lucky Santangelo in the television adaptation of Jackie Collins' Lucky Chances. The following years, she had star-billed roles in Somebody's Daughter (1992), Time to Heal (1994), Shadows of Desire (1994), Virus (1995), Silver Strand (1995), The People Next Door (1996), Murder in My Mind (1997), Dead Husbands (1998), The Spiral Staircase (2000), Haven't We Met Before? (2002), Deadly Betrayal (2003), and Deadly Visions (2004). Despite her television lead roles, her film career was limited. In 1992, she co-starred opposite Carol Burnett and Michael Caine in the comedy Noises Off and later had only two studio movies: Spy Hard (1996) opposite Leslie Nielsen and Beverly Hills Ninja (1997) starring Chris Farley. Additionally, Sheridan auditioned for two leading sitcom roles, Rachel Green on Friends and Grace Adler on Will & Grace, though the respective roles ultimately went to Jennifer Aniston and Debra Messing. However, Sheridan did make a guest appearance opposite Messing in 2003.

=== Desperate Housewives and lawsuit ===
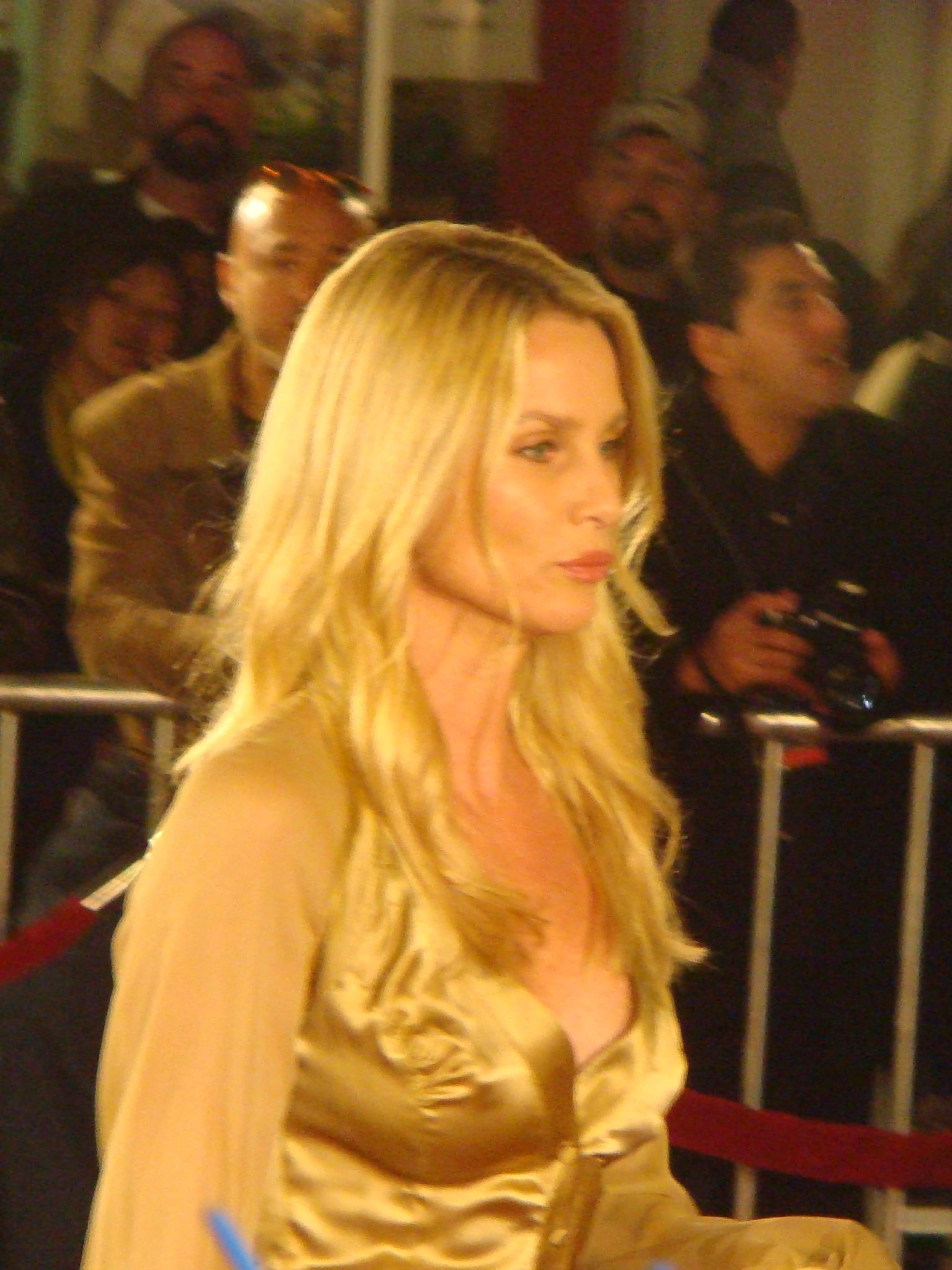
Sheridan at the premiere of Beowulf in November 2007

Sheridan landed her notable role as Edie Britt in the series Desperate Housewives. The character was originally written as a recurring role in the series. Sheridan had auditioned for Bree Van de Kamp, one of the series' more prominent roles. On 15 November 2004, Sheridan (in character as Britt) appeared with NFL wide receiver Terrell Owens in an introductory skit to that evening's Monday Night Football episode. Some observers condemned the skit as sexually suggestive, and ABC later apologized for airing it. On 14 March 2005, the Federal Communications Commission ruled that the skit did not violate decency standards, because it contained no outright nudity or foul language. Sheridan was nominated for a 2005 Golden Globe Award for Best Supporting Actress – Series, Miniseries or Television Film and was ranked number 48 on Maxim's 2006 Hot 100 List. In February 2009, during the show's fifth season, Sheridan announced her departure from Desperate Housewives. Her exit episode aired in April 2009, when Edie Britt was killed off. Unlike the other main characters who had been killed off over the years on Desperate Housewives, Sheridan did not make an appearance in the show's final episode, which aired in May 2012.

In April 2010, Sheridan filed a $20 million lawsuit against Desperate Housewives creator and producer Marc Cherry and ABC Television, alleging that she was assaulted by Cherry on the set of the show and was then fired when she reported the alleged abuse to the network. In her lawsuit, Sheridan claimed wrongful termination, assault and battery, gender violence, discrimination based on sex, sexual orientation, and age, and intentional infliction of emotional distress. She also alleged that Cherry was abusive to other cast members and writers. ABC responded by stating that while they were unaware of this particular complaint, they had investigated similar claims made by Sheridan and reportedly found them to be without merit. The show's stars, Teri Hatcher, Felicity Huffman, Marcia Cross, and Eva Longoria, pledged their support to help Cherry in his battle against Sheridan's allegations.

In May 2011, a judge granted permission for the case to continue to trial, but threw out Sheridan's claims of harassment. The case went to trial on 27 February 2012. Cherry asserted that the alleged assault was in fact a tap to the head with his fingers, done in rehearsals when he was demonstrating to Sheridan how she should play a physical gag in a scene. He also stated that the decision to kill off her character was already approved in May 2008 (several months before the alleged hitting incident in September 2008) due in part, to the need to reduce the show's budget. He also cited Sheridan's unprofessional on-set behavior (such as habitual lateness, not learning her lines, and feuding with her co-stars), and the fact that her character had simply "run its course" as other reasons for the decision. On 13 March 2012, the judge dismissed the battery charge against Cherry due to lack of evidence, and the lawsuit then focused solely on Sheridan's alleged wrongful termination by ABC. Closing arguments were heard on 14 March 2012 and the jury began their deliberations. By 19 March 2012, the jury had failed to reach a verdict and a mistrial was declared.

A retrial was scheduled for September 2012, but this was dismissed in August when the Los Angeles Court of Appeal determined that Sheridan had not been wrongfully fired. The court rejected Sheridan's argument that ABC's decision not to renew her option for another season was analogous to a violation of at-will employment. The court reasoned that unlike an at-will employee whose contract could remain in force indefinitely, Sheridan's contract was for a set term that had expired, so ABC had not terminated her, but simply chosen not to rehire her for another fixed-term contract. However, the court declared that Sheridan was free to file an amended lawsuit alleging that ABC retaliated against her for complaining about unsafe working conditions. A further appeal made by Sheridan to the California Supreme Court was rejected in November 2012. A new trial based solely on the retaliation claim was set for December 2013, but this, too, was dismissed in October 2013 by a judge who stated that Sheridan should have exhausted her claims through a labor commissioner before pursuing a trial. A further attempt by Sheridan to secure a new trial was refused on 16 January 2014, but the same judge reversed his decision on 29 January 2014 and granted Sheridan a new trial. This decision was later reversed in August 2014 by the Los Angeles Court of Appeal, which found the judge's decision to grant Sheridan a new trial was in error.

=== Later works ===
In 2010, Sheridan was cast in an untitled CBS comedy pilot as a mother who battles with her British ex-husband (played by Paul Kaye) to get her teenaged daughter to stardom, but the show was not picked up. In September 2010, Sheridan starred in the Hallmark Channel film, Honeymoon for One, which was set in Ireland. The film premiered on the Hallmark Channel on 13 August 2011. In 2013, she starred and co-produced another Hallmark movie, called The Christmas Spirit. In an interview in November 2013, Sheridan announced that she was hoping to find a network for a half-hour comedy series that she was then writing herself. She also co-starred in two independent comedy movies, Jewtopia (2012) and Let's Kill Ward's Wife (2014). In 2016, she filmed one more Hallmark movie, called All Yours.

On 28 November 2017, it was announced that Sheridan was cast in The CW remake of Dynasty as Alexis Morell Carrington, a role played by Joan Collins in the original series. Mark Pedowitz, the president of The CW, who had been president of ABC Studios during Sheridan's run on Desperate Housewives, called her about the role himself. He said, "I was big fan of Nicollette['s] from way back when. She wanted it, and she will be great in it." She received positive reviews for her debut as Alexis, and was promoted to series regular status for the second season. The CW announced on 25 February 2019 that Sheridan would be leaving Dynasty to focus on "some personal family responsibilities." Sheridan said in her own statement that she was leaving to spend more time with her terminally ill mother in Los Angeles. She last appeared in the episode "Motherly Overprotectiveness".

On 3 October 2023, Sheridan was announced to be featured in the Lifetime film, Ladies of the '80s: A Divas Christmas. According to the official synopsis, the movie follows five soap-opera divas readying for a reunion show who take on playing Cupid during Christmas to bring together their director and producer, as they all learn the meaning of true Christmas spirit. The ensemble cast is made up of Sheridan, Loni Anderson, Linda Gray, Morgan Fairchild, and Donna Mills; the latter two co-starred with Sheridan on Paper Dolls and Knots Landing, respectively.

In 2026, Sheridan joined the cast of Hal, a feature drama inspired by the true story behind the founding of humanitarian organization, Convoy of Hope.

== Personal life ==
During the 1980s, Sheridan dated teen idols Leif Garrett and Scott Baio. On 7 September 1991, she married actor Harry Hamlin, her co-star from the 1990 television film Deceptions. Hamlin filed for divorce on 21 August 1992, listing their date of separation as 13 July. From July 1992 to September 1995, Sheridan dated singer Michael Bolton. She was then involved for three years with Australian Simon Main, a relationship that ended in 2000 when Main was sentenced to four years in prison for trafficking ecstasy.

She began dating Swedish personal trainer Nicklas Söderblom in 2004 and became engaged to him on New Year's Eve 2004; the pair called off the engagement in October 2005. In October 2005, Sheridan was on a five-day photo-shoot in Australia, and met with ex-boyfriend Main following his release from prison. That December, she rekindled her romance with Bolton. Sheridan and Bolton announced their engagement in March 2006. Sheridan and Bolton recorded a duet, the title track of Bolton's 2006 album, Bolton Swings Sinatra: The Second Time Around. In March 2008, Sheridan posed nude for a London Fog charity ad which also featured Bolton. Sheridan and Bolton broke off their engagement in August 2008.

Sheridan married Aaron Phypers in December 2015, but the couple separated six months later. Their divorce was finalized in August 2018.

Sheridan started her own range of skincare products in 2019, Biolumière Organics.

=== The Real Housewives of Beverly Hills ===
On 19 February 2019, the second episode of the ninth season of The Real Housewives of Beverly Hills featured Denise Richards (current wife of Aaron Phypers) and Lisa Rinna (current wife of Sheridan's first husband Harry Hamlin) discussing their connection via their respective marriages to Sheridan's former husbands. Rinna recounts details about Sheridan having an affair with Michael Bolton while Hamlin was in Canada, resulting in the dissolution of their marriage. Days later, Sheridan denied Rinna's claims on Twitter, stating that Hamlin and she had ended their marriage "nose-to-nose" in Canada. Hamlin came to Rinna's defense, though Sheridan re-affirmed "the end of our marriage had nothing to do with anyone other than us." Fans of The Real Housewives of Beverly Hills have since advocated for Sheridan to join the cast of the show, especially after Richards' departure at the end of the tenth season. In November 2020, producer Andy Cohen confirmed that Sheridan would not be asked to join the show due to her feud with Rinna.

== Filmography ==
=== Film ===
Year	Title	Role	Notes
1985	The Sure Thing	"The Sure Thing"	
1989	Dirty Tennis	Herself	Direct-to-video; short film
1992	Noises Off	Brooke Ashton/Vicki	
1996	Spy Hard	Veronique Ukrinsky, Agent 3.14	
1997	Beverly Hills Ninja	Allison Page/Sally Jones	
1998	I Woke Up Early the Day I Died	Ballroom Woman	Cameo
2000	Raw Nerve	Izabel Sauvestre	
2002	.com for Murder	Misty Brummel	Direct-to-video
2002	Tarzan & Jane	Eleanor (voice)	Direct-to-video
2003	Lost Treasure	Carrie	Direct-to-video
2007	Code Name: The Cleaner	Diane	
2008	Fly Me to the Moon	Nadia (voice)	
2009	Noah's Ark: The New Beginning	Zenna (voice)	Direct-to-video
2011	XXIT	Nikki Williams	Short film
2012	Jewtopia	Betsy O'Connell	
2014	Let's Kill Ward's Wife	Robin Peters	Cameo
TBD	Hal	Huldah	

=== Television ===
Year	Title	Role	Notes
1984	Paper Dolls	Taryn Blake	Series regular
1985	Scene of the Crime	Liza	Episode: "Murder on the Rocks"
1986–1993	Knots Landing	Paige Matheson	Series regular Soap Opera Digest Award for Outstanding Lead Actress: Prime Time (1990); Soap Opera Digest Award for Outstanding Heroine – Prime Time (1991)
1986	Dead Man's Folly	Hattie Stubbs	Television film
1986	Dark Mansions	Banda Drake	Television film
1990	Deceptions	Adrienne Erickson	Television film
1990	Lucky/Chances	Lucky Santangelo	Miniseries
1991	Paradise	Lily	Episode: "Twenty-Four Hours"
1992	Somebody's Daughter	Sara	Television film
1994	A Time to Heal	Jenny Barton	Television film
1994	Shadows of Desire	Rowena Ecklund	Television film
1995	Virus	Marissa Blumenthal	Television film
1995	Indictment: The McMartin Trial	Grace	Television film; uncredited
1995	Silver Strand	Michelle Hughes	Television film
1996	The People Next Door	Anna Morse	Television film
1997	Murder in My Mind	Callain Pearson	Television film
1997	The Larry Sanders Show	herself	Episode: "The Matchmaker"
1997	Knots Landing: Back to the Cul-de-Sac	Paige Matheson	Miniseries; uncredited cameo
1998	Dead Husbands	Alexandra Elston	Television film
2000	The Spiral Staircase	Helen Capel	Television film
2001	The Legend of Tarzan	Eleanor (voice)	2 episodes
2002	Haven't We Met Before?	Eliza/Kate/Emily Winton	Television film
2003	Static Shock	Darci Mason	Episode: "Toys in the Hood"
2003	Deadly Betrayal	Donna Randal	Television film
2003	Will & Grace	Dr. Danielle Morty	Episode: "24"
2003	Becker	Anna	Episode: "A First Class Flight"
2004	Deadly Visions	Ann Culver	Television film
2004	The Karate Dog	White Cat (voice)	Television film
2004–2009	Desperate Housewives	Edie Britt Williams	Series regular, 92 episodes (seasons 1–5); Screen Actors Guild Award for Outstanding Performance by an Ensemble in a Comedy Series (2005–09); Nominated—Golden Globe Award for Best Supporting Actress – Series, Miniseries or Television Film (2005); Nominated—Gold Derby Award for Best Comedy Supporting Actress (2005, 2007)
2011	Honeymoon for One	Eve Parker	Television film
2013	The Christmas Spirit	Charlotte Hart	Television film; also writer and executive producer
2016	All Yours	Cass	Television film; also executive producer
2018–2019	Dynasty	Alexis Morell Carrington	Recurring role (season 1, 7 episodes); Main role (season 2, 15 episodes)
2023	Ladies of the '80s: A Divas Christmas	Juliette Matheson	Television film
