= Underneath (The X-Files) =

- The X-Files episode
- Episode no.: Season 9 Episode 12
- Directed by: John Shiban
- Written by: John Shiban
- Production code: 9ABX09
- Original air date: March 31, 2002
- Running time: 44 minutes

Guest appearances
- W. Earl Brown as Robert Fassl; Lisa Darr as Jana Fain; Arthur J. Nascarella as Duke Tomasick; Robert Curtis Brown as Damon Kaylor; Alan Davidson as Bearded Man; Mary-Margaret Lewis as Mrs. Dowdy; Paul Vincent O'Connor as Superintendent Brian Hutchinson; Kelly McNair as Teenage Girl; Michael Patterson as Dad; Carol Kiernan as Mom; Aaron D. Spears as Guard

Episode chronology
← Previous "Audrey Pauley"	Next → "Improbable"
- The X-Files season 9

"Underneath" is the twelfth episode of the ninth season of the American science fiction television series The X-Files. The episode first aired in the United States on March 31, 2002, on the Fox network. The episode was written and directed by executive producer John Shiban. The episode is a "monster-of-the-week" episode, a stand-alone plot which is unconnected to the mythology, or overarching fictional history, of The X-Files. The episode earned a Nielsen rating of 4.4 and was viewed by 4.64 million households and 7.3 million viewers. It received mixed reviews from critics.

The show centers on FBI special agents who work on cases linked to the paranormal, called X-Files; this season focuses on the investigations of John Doggett (Robert Patrick), Monica Reyes (Annabeth Gish), and Dana Scully (Gillian Anderson). In this episode, Doggett is determined to find an error in the DNA evidence that freed the convicted Robert Fassl, the "Screwdriver Killer", whom he nearly caught in the act 13 years earlier. In the end, it is revealed that Fassl has a mental condition that splits him into two parts: the religious innocent and the vengeful killer.

"Underneath" marked the directorial debut of Shiban, who had been a writer for the series for several seasons. Reportedly, the episode contained "so many problems" that the Fox executives nearly refused to allow the finished product to air. At the last minute, however, they relented, and allowed the episode to be aired later on in the season, several weeks after its intended air date. Shiban originally wanted to film the sewer scenes in Los Angeles' actual sewer system, but due to the events of September 11, a sewer mock-up was built on Stage 11 at the Fox studios.

== Plot ==
Thirteen years before the present, Robert Fassl (W. Earl Brown) sits in his van. He later approaches a home and claims to be there to repair the cable. As Fassl holds up a piece of paper to show it to the family who called for the repair, blood spatter splashes across the paper. He looks up and sees the house's occupants with slit throats in pools of blood. Abruptly, two police officers burst into the house and apprehend Fassl. One of the officers who goes to check out the kitchen turns to reveal he is John Doggett (Robert Patrick) as a young NYPD officer.

In the present, Monica Reyes (Annabeth Gish) discusses Fassl's release—due to DNA evidence—with an outraged Doggett. Dana Scully (Gillian Anderson) confirms that the test results conclusively disprove Fassl as the killer. Meanwhile, outside the courthouse, Fassl notices a mysterious Bearded Man. After being released, he stays in a room belonging to his lawyer, Jana Fain, where he clutches a Rosary beads and prays frantically. When the Bearded Man appears, Fassl begs for the man not to hurt her. While Fain is unharmed, Fassl learns that the housekeeper, Mrs. Dowdy, has gone missing. Fassl finds her body, cleans up the blood, and dismembers her remains to cover up what has happened.

Scully tells Doggett that while the DNA test disproves Fassl's culpability, it implicates a possible blood relative; Fassl, however, is an only child. Reyes proposes that the murders are being conducted by an entity rather than a person. Meanwhile, Fassl approaches Assistant District Attorney Damon Kaylor and begs to be sent back to prison. Kaylor refuses, but is killed by the Bearded Man. After hearing of Kaylor's disappearance, Reyes theorizes that Fassl's piety and his unwillingness to acknowledge his darker half has given him the unwanted ability to physically change into another, more violent person.

The Bearded Man demands that Fassl kill Fain, beating him up when he doesn't comply. As she tends to Fassl, Fain first sees the Bearded Man in his place. While staking out Fain's house, the agents see the Bearded Man flee. Doggett pursues the Bearded Man while Reyes finds Fain unharmed. In the pursuit, Reyes falls through into a sewer, where she finds the remains of the Bearded Man's victims. After a struggle with the Bearded Man who is holding Doggett at knife point, Reyes shoots. The Bearded Man falls into the water and Doggett goes after him, only to pull up Fassl, much to his confusion. Reyes tries to remind him that it does not matter as long as the case is solved.

== Production ==
"Underneath" was written and directed by executive producer John Shiban. This marked his directorial debut. According to Shiban, the series' production staff had "actually talked for some time about doing a Jekyll/Hyde story but never quite found a way to do it" until the idea to use DNA came into play. Shiban also was inspired by the film The Third Man (1949), which featured a climactic chase through a sewage system.

The episode, which explores John Doggett's backstory as a New York City police officer, was described as containing similar themes as those "explored on the Millennium series." The episode guest-starred Arthur Nascarella, who was a friend of series co-star Robert Patrick. Patrick was essential in getting Nascarella cast on the show; he later joked "I stole [Nascarella's] New York accent in Copland [sic] and I stole it to do The X-Files, but I got him cast in The X-Files show."

As the ninth season progressed and the show's ratings began to plummet, Fox became more and more actively involved in the show's style and direction. Although "Underneath" was the twelfth episode aired, it was actually the ninth episode produced; reportedly, the episode contained "so many problems" that the Fox executives very nearly nixed the finished product. At the last minute, however, they relented, and allowed the episode to be aired later in the season, several weeks after its intended air date.

Shiban originally wanted to film the sewer scenes in Los Angeles' actual sewer system, but the Los Angeles Department of Water and Power vetoed the idea and stated that "there's a moratorium on shooting there since September 11", a position that Shiban called "understandable." In order to make up for this, series art director Corey Kaplan was tasked with building a sewer replica on Stage 11 at the Fox studios; she used the blueprints from the 1952 version of Les Misérables as an inspiration.

== Reception ==
"Underneath" first aired in the United States on March 31, 2002, on the Fox network. The episode later debuted in the United Kingdom on February 2, 2003, on BBC One. The episode earned a Nielsen household rating of 4.4, meaning that it was seen by 4.4% of the nation's estimated households and was viewed by 4.64 million households (Note: At the time of airing, the estimated number of households was 105.5 million. Thus, 4.4 percent of 105.5 million is 4.64 million households.) and over 7.3 million viewers. "Underneath" was the 71st most watched episode of television that aired during the week ending March 31.

The episode received mixed reviews from television critics. Jessica Morgan from Television Without Pity gave the episode a B− rating. Robert Shearman and Lars Pearson, in their book Wanting to Believe: A Critical Guide to The X-Files, Millennium & The Lone Gunmen, rated the episode three-and-a-half stars out of five, and called the entry "solid and efficient". The two complimented Shiban's directorial efforts, noting that "as a director [he] makes 'Underneath' shine", but were critical of some of the "trademark X-File moments", citing "the surprise appearance of a face in the bathroom mirror" and "the climactic fight in a sewer" as examples. Shearman and Pearson, however, wrote positively of Shiban's realistic depiction of Doggett. M.A. Crang, in his book Denying the Truth: Revisiting The X-Files after 9/11, wrote that the episode felt "very familiar" but was impressed with the production design on the sewer set.

== Bibliography ==
- Hurwitz, Matt; Knowles, Chris (2008). The Complete X-Files. Insight Editions. ISBN 978-1933784809.
- Kessenich, Tom (2002). Examination: An Unauthorized Look at Seasons 6–9 of the X-Files. Trafford Publishing. ISBN 1553698126.
- Shearman, Robert; Pearson, Lars (2009). Wanting to Believe: A Critical Guide to The X-Files, Millennium & The Lone Gunmen. Mad Norwegian Press. ISBN 978-0975944691.

This article incorporates material derived from the "Underneath" article on the X-Files wiki at Fandom (formerly Wikia) and is licensed under the Creative Commons Attribution-Share Alike 3.0 License (May 7, 2012).
