= Tracey Ellis =

Canadian actress

Tracey Ellis is a Canadian actress, known for The Last of the Mohicans (1992), This Boy's Life (1993) and The Age of Innocence (1993). She also appeared as Alice in the 1997 unaired live action Dilbert pitch pilot.

== Filmography ==
=== Film ===
Year	Title	Role
1988	The Prince of Pennsylvania	Lois Sike
1988	Necromancer	Student #4
1992	The Last of the Mohicans	Alexandra Cameron
1993	This Boy's Life	Kathy
1993	The Age of Innocence	Gertrude Lefferts
1994	The NeverEnding Story III	Jane Bux
1996	The Crow: City of Angels	Sybil
1997	Queen: Made in Heaven	
1999	Instinct	Annie

=== Television ===
Year	Title	Role	Notes
1992	Law & Order	Nurse Miriam Gregg	"Helpless"
1993	Perry Mason: The Case of the Telltale Talk Show Host	Doris Lester	TV film
1993	Grace Under Fire	Evie Burdette	"Sister, Sister"
1994	Hart to Hart: Home Is Where the Hart Is	Claire Stinson	TV film
1994	The Larry Sanders Show	Mary Beth Nagler	"You're Having My Baby"
1994	ER	Annette	"24 Hours"
1995	The X-Files	Lucy Householder	"Oubliette"
1996	O. Henry's Christmas	Susie	TV film
1996	The People Next Door	Donna James	TV film
1999	Swing Vote	Marley Terrell	TV film
1999	Two Guys and a Girl	Mary	"Two Guys, a Girl and Barenaked Ladies"
1999	Last Rites	Lydia Stedman	TV film
1999	Judging Amy	Anne Featherstone	"Witch Hunt"
2000	Star Trek: Voyager	Yifay	"Child's Play"
2001	Dharma & Greg	Sandy	"Judy & Greg"
2002	The X-Files	Audrey Pauley	"Audrey Pauley"

=== Theatre ===
Year	Title	Role	Theatre
1991	Our Country's Good		Hartford Stage
