= Jewel Staite =

Canadian actress (born 1982)

- Staite at Dragon Con in 2026
- Born: Jewel Belair Staite; June 2, 1982 (age 44); White Rock, British Columbia, Canada
- Occupation: Actress
- Years active: 1991–present
- Spouses: Matt Anderson (m. 2003; div. 2011) Charlie Ritchie (m. 2016)
- Children: 1

Jewel Belair Staite (born June 2, 1982) is a Canadian actress. She is known for her roles as Kaylee Frye in the series Firefly (2002–2003) and its follow-up movie Serenity (2005), and as Jennifer Keller on science fiction television series Stargate Atlantis (2007–2009). Staite also starred as Catalina in Space Cases (1996), as "Becca" Fisher in Flash Forward (1996–1997), as Raquel Westbrook in the Canadian drama The L.A. Complex (2012), as Caroline Swift in AMC's crime drama The Killing (2013–2014), as Abigail Bianchi in the Canadian legal drama series Family Law (2021–2026), and as FBI agent Jules Gardner in the science fiction series Resident Alien (2021-2025).

== Early life ==
Staite was born in White Rock, British Columbia, the youngest of seven children. She has said that she is of British, Irish, French Canadian, and Iroquois ancestry. She began her career in early childhood, working both as a model and, from the age of six, as an actor. She attended Vancouver Film School and developed her stagecraft at the Vancouver Youth Theatre.

== Career ==
Staite's first high profile appearances as a child actor came in television movies such as CBC's Liar, Liar in 1993 (which was later aired on CBS in the United States that same year) and ABC's The Only Way Out. In 1995, she had a key guest-starring role in a third-season episode of The X-Files, "Oubliette".

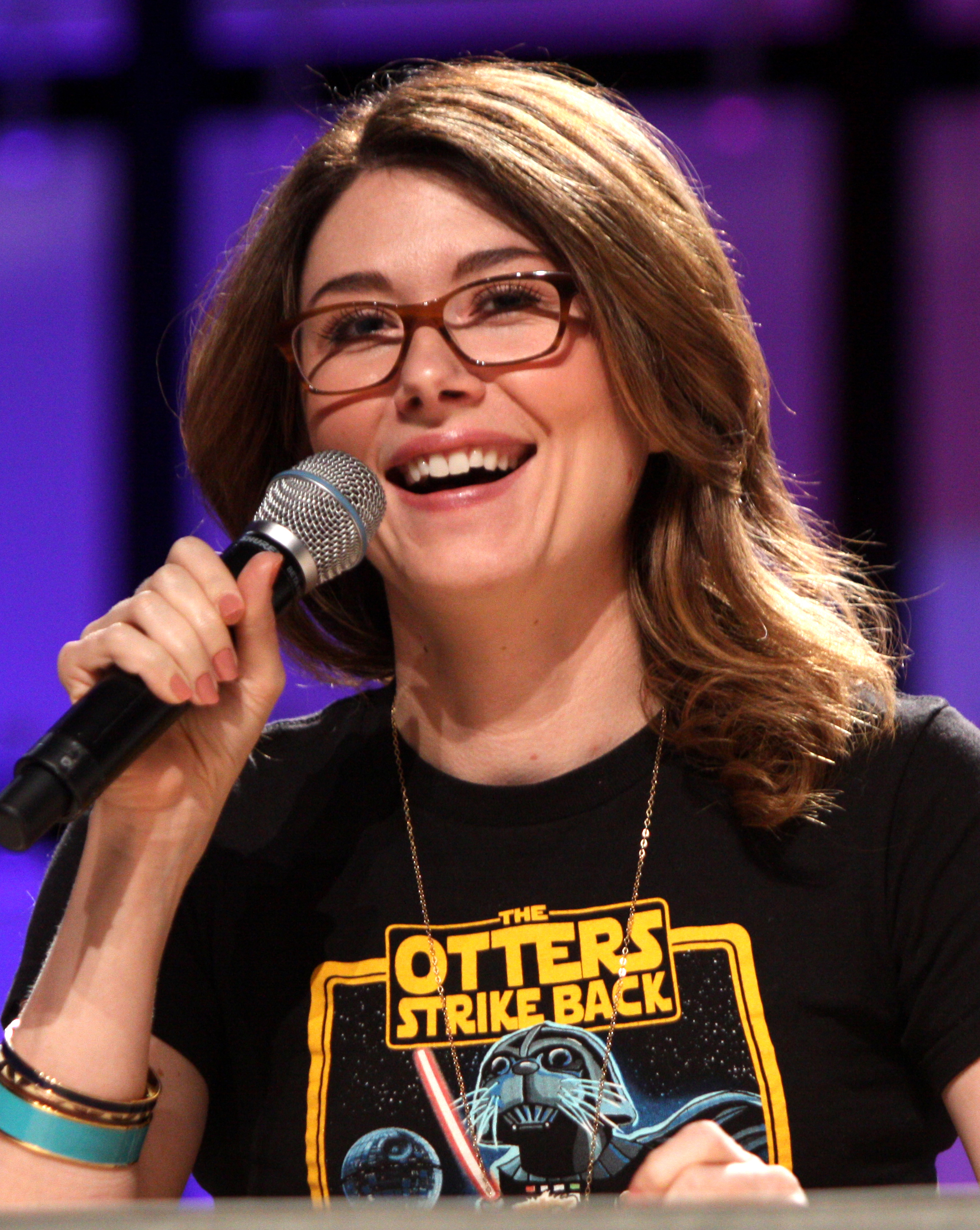
Staite at 2013 Phoenix Comicon

After appearing on Are You Afraid of the Dark? (1994), Staite's first co-starring role on a television series was as Catalina, the ship's engineer, in the first season of the Nickelodeon science fiction series Space Cases in 1996. This was immediately followed by her role as Rebecca "Becca" Fisher on the 1995–1997 Disney Channel series Flash Forward, a series in which Staite was the co-lead with Ben Foster.

In 2000, she was cast in a main role on the FOX Family Channel drama series Higher Ground. She was also a voice actress in the animated TV series Mummies Alive! and Sabrina: The Animated Series for DIC Entertainment.

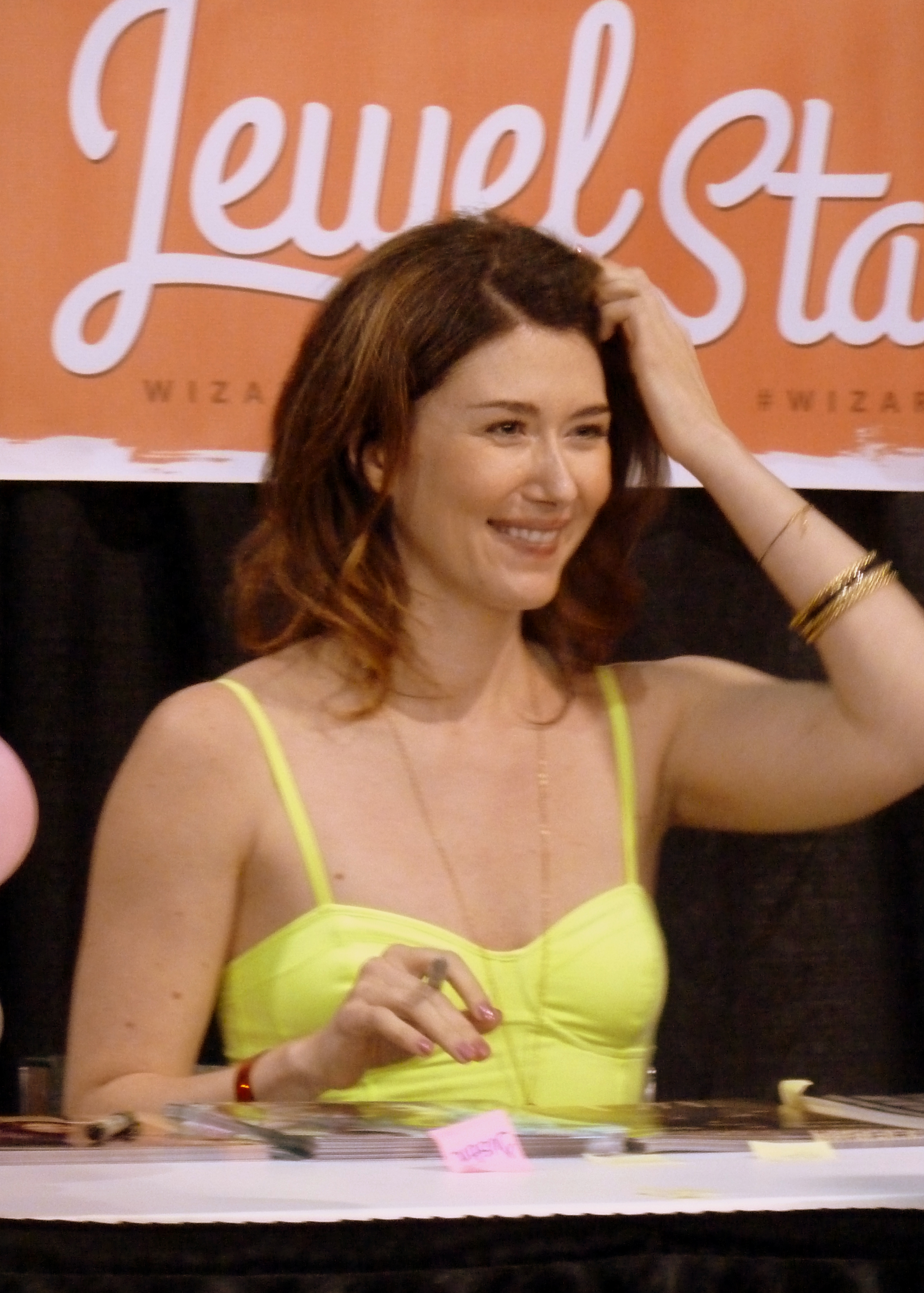
Staite in 2013

Staite played Kaylee Frye in the short-lived television series Firefly and its subsequent 2005 film, Serenity. She wrote a chapter in the book Finding Serenity, called "Kaylee Speaks: Jewel Staite On Firefly". She played the recurring role of Heidi Gotts in the television series Wonderfalls in 2004.

Staite played the role of head medical doctor Jennifer Keller in the Stargate SG-1 spinoff Stargate Atlantis, making her one of three actors from the Firefly series to move on to appear in a Stargate series (the others being Adam Baldwin, who appeared in the episode "Heroes", and Morena Baccarin, who played Adria in the tenth season of SG-1). She replaced Paul McGillion (Dr. Carson Beckett). In the fifth season of Stargate, her character was changed from recurring status to part of the main cast. Before taking on the role as Dr. Keller, she previously played the Wraith child Ellia in the Stargate Atlantis episode "Instinct". She also appeared in the 2010 Syfy film, Mothman, under direction from Sheldon Wilson. Also in 2010, Staite guest-starred in an episode of Warehouse 13 as the love interest of Sheldon (played by Sean Maher, who played her love interest in Firefly), and in 2011, she guest-starred on an episode of Supernatural as a former love interest of Sam.

In 2012, Staite was a series regular on The L.A. Complex, in which she portrayed Raquel Westbrook, a struggling actress. The show aired in Canada on CTV and MuchMusic and in the U.S. on The CW. She also appeared in an episode of The Listener. Staite appeared in 10 episodes of the AMC crime drama, The Killing, as Detective Stephen Holder's girlfriend Caroline Swift, from 2013–2014.

== Personal life ==
Staite was married to actor Matt Anderson from 2003 to 2011. In 2015, she became engaged to her boyfriend Charlie Ritchie. In May 2015, she announced she was pregnant with her first child, a boy, who was born later that year. She and Ritchie married on July 23, 2016.

== Filmography ==
=== Film ===
Year	Title	Role	Notes
1995	Gold Diggers: The Secret of Bear Mountain	Samantha	
1996	Carpool	Soap Opera Actress	
2002	Cheats	Teddy Blue	
2005	Serenity	Kaylee	
2009	After Dusk They Come	Liz	Straight-to-video
2011	The Pact	Anna	Short film
2015	She Who Must Burn	Margaret	
2015	How to Plan an Orgy in a Small Town	Cassie Cranston	Lead role

=== Television ===
Key
†	Denotes television productions that have not yet been released

Year	Title	Role	Notes
1991	Posing: Inspired by Three Real Stories	Jennifer Lanahan	Television film
1992; 1994	The Odyssey	Labelia	Episodes: "The Believers", "The Prophecy"
1993	Liar, Liar	Dorianna	Television film; aired in the U.S. as Liar, Liar: Between Father and Daughter
1993	The Only Way Out	Alexandra Carlisle	Television film
1994	Are You Afraid of the Dark?	Kelly	Episode: "The Tale of Watcher's Woods"
1995	Are You Afraid of the Dark?	Cody	Episode: "The Tale of the Unfinished Painting"
1995	The X-Files	Amy Jacobs	Episode: "Oubliette"
1996	The Prisoner of Zenda, Inc.	Theresa	Television film
1996	Space Cases	Catalina	Main role (season 1)
1996–1997	Flash Forward	Rebecca "Becca" Fisher	Lead role
1997–1999	Honey, I Shrunk the Kids: The TV Show	Tiara VanHorn	5 episodes
1998–2001	Da Vinci's Inquest	Gabriella Da Vinci	13 episodes
1999	So Weird	Callie Snow	Episode: "Siren"
1999	Sabrina: The Animated Series	N/A	Voice role, 4 episodes
1999	Nothing Too Good for a Cowboy	Sally Prentiss	Episodes: "Happy Trails", "Fools for Love"
2000	Higher Ground	Daisy Lipenowski	Main role
2001	The Immortal	Danielle Jenkins	Episode: "Learning Curve"
2001	2gether: The Series	Josie	Episode: "Kiss"
2001	Seven Days	Molly	Episode: "Empty Quiver"
2002	Roughing It	Susan Olivia Clemens	Television film
2002	Damaged Care	Bryanna (15–20 years)	Television film
2002	Beyond Belief: Fact or Fiction	Carly / Shannon	Episode: "The Fine Line"
2002	Just Deal	Laurel	8 episodes
2002–2003	Firefly	Kaylee Frye	Main role
2003	Dead Like Me	Goth Girl	Episode: "Rest in Peace"
2004	Huff	Carolyn	Episode: Pilot
2004	Cold Squad	Thora Andrews	Episode: "Girlfriend in a Closet"
2004	Wonderfalls	Heidi Gotts	4 episodes
2005	Widow on the Hill	Jenny Cavanaugh	Television film
2005	Stargate Atlantis	Ellia	Episode: "Instinct"
2007–2009	Stargate Atlantis	Jennifer Keller	Recurring role (season 4); main role (season 5); 33 episodes
2010	Mothman	Katharine Grant	Television film
2010	Warehouse 13	Loretta	Episode: "Mild Mannered"
2010	Debbie Macomber's Call Me Mrs. Miracle	Holly	Television film; also known as Mrs Miracle 2: Miracle in Manhattan
2011	Doomsday Prophecy	Brook Calvin	Television film
2011	Supernatural	Amy Pond	Episode: "The Girl Next Door"
2012	The L.A. Complex	Raquel Westbrook	Main role
2012–2013	Animism: The Gods' Lake	Melody Ravensfall	Main voice role
2013	The Listener	Lori Black	Episode: "Blast from the Past"
2013	The Christmas Ornament	Jenna	Television film
2013	State of Syn	Annika Drake	TV shorts, 6 episodes
2013–2014	The Killing	Caroline Swift	11 episodes
2015	40 Below and Falling a/k/a A Frosty Affair	Kate Carter	Television film; Lead role
2016	Legends of Tomorrow	Dr. Bryce	Episode: "Progeny"
2016	Castle	Erin Cherloff	Episode: "Much Ado About Murder"
2016	Undercover Wife	Monica Boland	Television film; also known as Not with His Wife
2017	The Wrong Bed: Naked Pursuit	Stella Williams	Television film
2017	Same Time Next Week	Sarah	Television film
2017, 2020	Blindspot	Kiva Garen	Episodes: "Regard a Mere Mad Rager" & "Iunne Ennui"
2018	The Detectives	Detective Penny Hart	Episode: "She Said"
2018	Take Two	Jackie Jarvis / Angela Truman	Episode: "About Last Night"
2018	The Good Doctor	Stella	Episode: "Two Ply (or Not Two Ply)"
2019	The Order	Renee Marand	Episodes: "Homecoming, Parts One & Two"
2019–2020	The Magicians	Phyllis	4 episodes (seasons 4–5)
2021–2026	Family Law	Abigail Bianchi	Main role
2022	Quantum Leap	Naomi Harvey	Episode: "What a Disaster!"
2025	Resident Alien	Jules Gardner	4 episodes (season 4)
TBA	Firefly: The Animated Series †	Kaylee Frye	Main voice role
