= Dick Van Patten =

American actor (1928–2015)

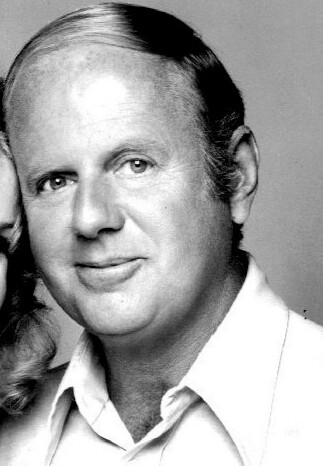
- Van Patten in a 1977 publicity photo
- Born: Richard Vincent Van Patten; December 9, 1928; New York City, U.S.
- Died: June 23, 2015 (aged 86); Santa Monica, California, U.S.
- Resting place: Forest Lawn Memorial Park, Hollywood Hills
- Occupations: Actor; comedian; businessman; animal welfare advocate
- Years active: 1935–2012
- Known for: Tom Bradford in Eight Is Enough
- Spouse: Patricia Helon Poole (m. 1954)
- Children: 3, including Vincent
- Relatives: Joyce Van Patten (sister); Tim Van Patten (half-brother); Talia Balsam (niece); Grace Van Patten (niece); Anna Van Patten (niece)

Richard Vincent Van Patten (December 9, 1928 – June 23, 2015) was an American actor, comedian, businessman, and animal welfare advocate whose career spanned seven decades of television. He was best known for his role as patriarch Tom Bradford on the television series Eight Is Enough.

Van Patten began work as a child actor and was successful on the New York stage, appearing in more than a dozen plays as a teenager. He worked in radio, on Duffy's Tavern. He later starred in numerous television roles including the long-running CBS television series Mama and Young Doctor Malone. Later, he would star or co-star in many feature films, including Charly, Mel Brooks's Robin Hood: Men in Tights and Spaceballs, and Soylent Green. Van Patten was the founder of Natural Balance Pet Foods and National Guide Dog Month.

== Early life ==
Richard Vincent Van Patten was born on December 9, 1928, in the Kew Gardens section of the New York City borough of Queens, the elder child of Richard Byron Van Patten, an interior decorator, and Josephine Rose (née Acerno), who worked in advertising. His younger sister was actress Joyce Van Patten. In 1934 his family moved nearby to Richmond Hill.

His mother was of Italian descent, while his father had Dutch and English ancestry. He began work as a model and actor as a child making his Broadway debut at the age of 7. He was successful on the New York City stage, appearing in a dozen theatrical plays before reaching his teen years. He later moved to Hollywood and began a lengthy career in film and television.

== Career ==
=== Actor ===
Van Patten's career in show business began as a child actor on Broadway in 1935 in Tapestry In Gray starring Melvyn Douglas. He was billed as Dickie Van Patten and went on to appear in 12 other Broadway plays as a teenager, including The Skin of Our Teeth. He moved to television with the role of Nels Hansen in the series Mama, starring Peggy Wood, about a Norwegian-American family living in San Francisco in the early 20th century. It ran from 1949 to 1957. In 1949, James Dean, then an unknown, replaced Patten on the show for a time when Patten was drafted into the Army. In 1975, he played "Friar Tuck" on When Things Were Rotten, a comic take on Robin Hood, created by Mel Brooks. The series ran for 13 episodes. He was best known as the Bradford family patriarch, Tom Bradford, on Eight Is Enough, which aired from 1977 to 1981, and which was based on a book of the same name by the American journalist Thomas Braden.

Van Patten appeared in episodes of Sanford and Son, Banacek, Arrested Development, The Brian Keith Show, Cannon, The Streets of San Francisco, Adam-12, Emergency!, Growing Pains, and Happy Days. He had numerous leading roles in motion pictures including Joe Kidd, The Snowball Express and The Santa Trap. He played a small role in the dystopian film Soylent Green (1973).

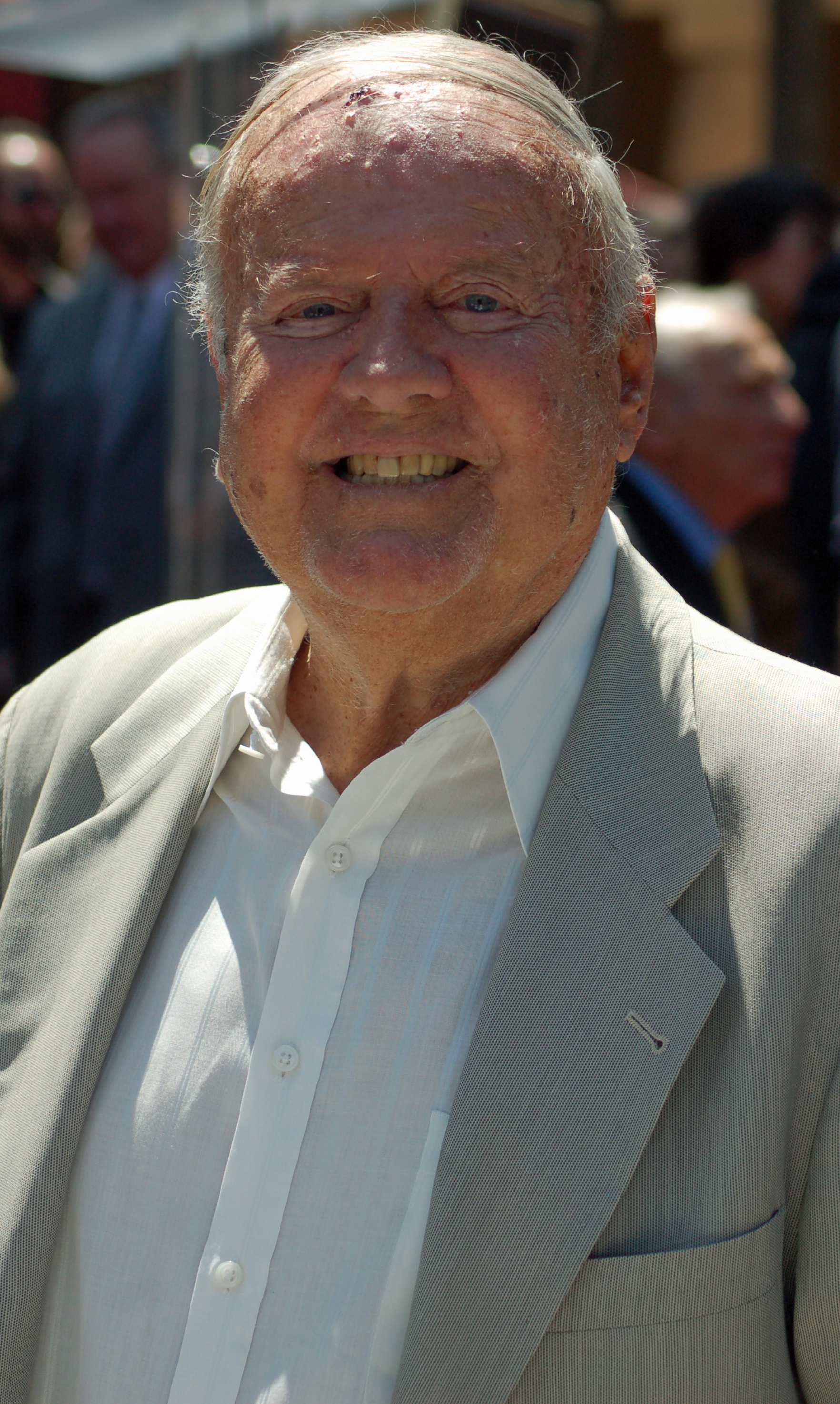
Van Patten in April 2010

Van Patten appeared in several films directed by Mel Brooks, including High Anxiety, Spaceballs, and Robin Hood: Men in Tights as well as cameos in the music videos for "Smells Like Nirvana" and "Bedrock Anthem" by "Weird Al" Yankovic, and on The Weird Al Show. He played "Jack Benson" in Opposite Day (2009). He also was a commentator for the World Series of Poker from 1993 to 1995.

The Hollywood Walk of Fame honored Van Patten on November 20, 1985, with a Star of Television marker at 1541 North Vine Street. On January 12, 2008, Van Patten received a star on the Palm Springs Walk of Stars.

On November 1, 2009, Phoenix Books published Eighty Is Not Enough!, a book co-authored by Van Patten and Robert Baer, in which Van Patten shared his 80-year journey of insights and anecdotes through the entertainment industry. He discusses his journey from his humble beginning in Queens, New York; his rise as a childhood star on Broadway during the Great Depression; working as an actor on the radio; the advent of television and his role in the second-ever live situation comedy Mama; a rough period between acting gigs including spending time as a real estate agent in Queens, New York; a rise back to the top that led the TV icon to the lead role on the popular hit show Eight Is Enough; and subsequent roles in television and movies.

=== Other work ===
An animal enthusiast, Van Patten co-founded Dick Van Patten's Natural Balance Pet Foods in 1989. Van Patten's creation of his own brand of dog food was satirized in comedian John Hodgman's 2008 book More Information Than You Require, and was rebranded as Dick Van Patten's Hobo Chili for Dogs. Van Patten also appeared as a television spokesman for Fisher-Price toys in the late 1980s.

== Personal life ==
=== Family ===
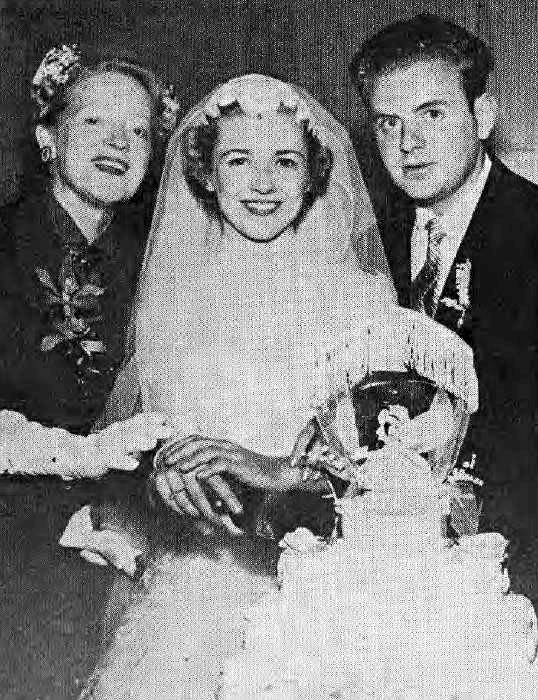
Peggy Wood, who played Van Patten's mother in the television program Mama, congratulates Pat and Dick on their wedding, 1954.

Van Patten was the older brother of actress Joyce Van Patten, and the older half-brother of film director and Emmy award-winning television director/producer Tim Van Patten. He was married to Patricia Helon Poole (also known as Pat Poole and Pat Van Patten; born March 12, 1931) from 1954 until his death. Pat Poole was a professional dancer on Broadway and a June Taylor dancer on The Jackie Gleason Show. They lived in Sherman Oaks, California. They had three sons, all actors: Nels, James and Vincent. Nels, who is married to actress Nancy Valen, is named for the character Van Patten played on the CBS's Mama. Van Patten was related to several other actors through marriages. His sister Joyce married actor Martin Balsam; their daughter is actress Talia Balsam. Talia's first husband was actor George Clooney, and she is now married to actor John Slattery. Van Patten's son Vince is married to actress Eileen Davidson.

=== Illness and death ===
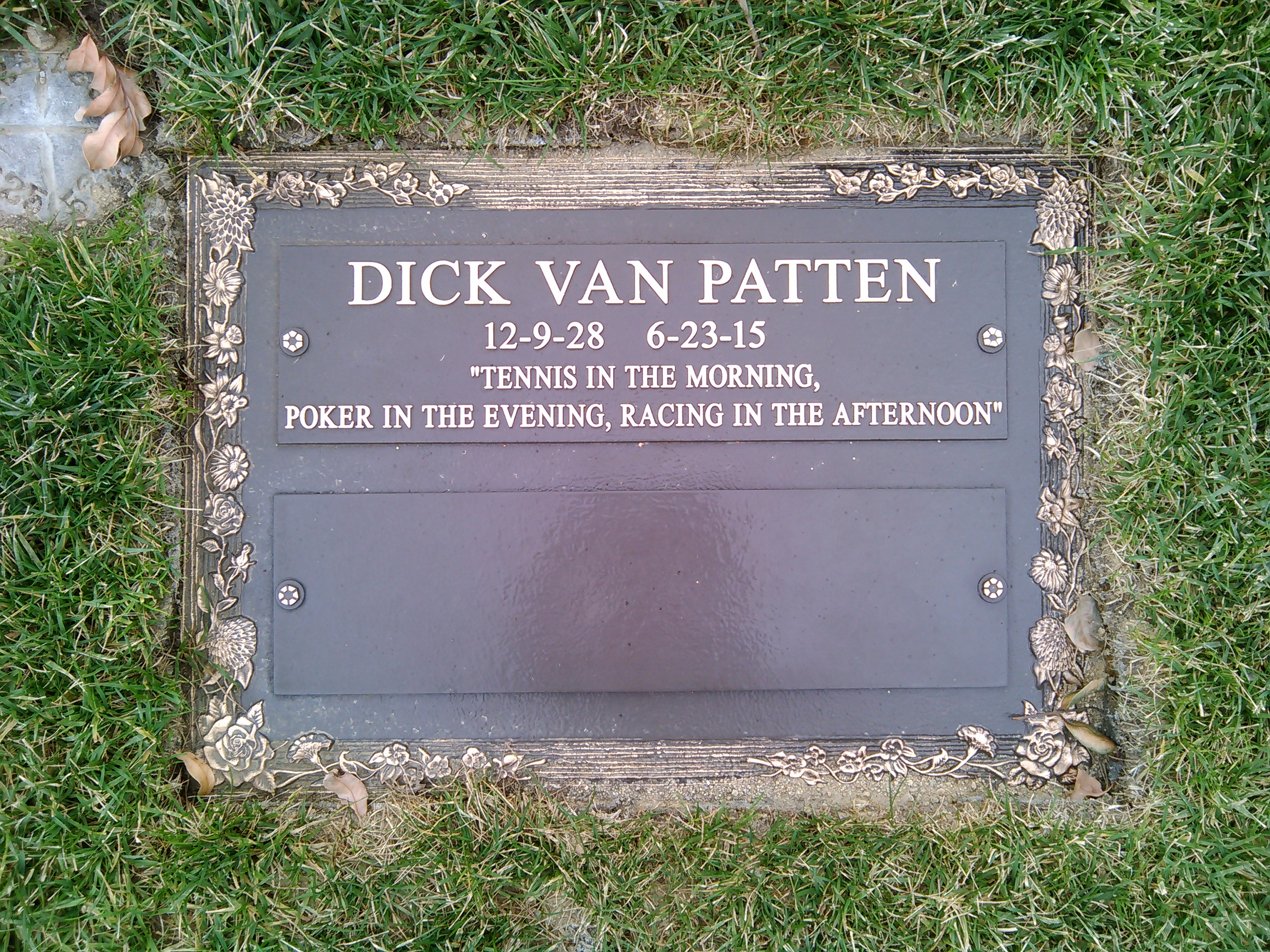
Grave of Dick Van Patten at Forest Lawn Memorial Park, Hollywood Hills.

In January 2006, Van Patten was taken to Cedars Sinai Medical Center in Los Angeles following a diabetic stroke. Van Patten, who had Type 2 diabetes, made a full recovery. Van Patten died at Saint John's Health Center in Santa Monica, California, on June 23, 2015, at age 86. Complications from diabetes were the listed cause.

Willie Aames, who played son Tommy Bradford on Eight Is Enough, called his television father "truly a gem [who] will be missed...As Dick always said 'Remember our times together, gang...Cause these ARE the good ole' days". Betty Buckley, Van Patten's co-star on the series, said "Every day on the set he was a happy, jovial person, always generous and ready to play, tease, and always keep us all laughing. He was the consummate professional, a wonderful actor, master of comedy, and a kind and generous human being."

He is interred in the Forest Lawn Memorial Park in the Hollywood Hills of Los Angeles.

=== Honors ===
On November 20, 1985, Dick Van Patten was honored with a star on the Hollywood Walk of Fame. In 2008, a Golden Palm Star on the Palm Springs Walk of Stars was dedicated to him.

== Filmography ==
=== Film ===
Year	Title	Role	Notes
1963	Violent Midnight	Police Lt. Palmer	film debut
1967	The Secret Dream Models of Oliver Nibble	Oliver Nibble	short film; as John Acerno
1968	Charly	Bert	as Richard Van Patten
1971	Zachariah	The Dude	
1971	Making It	Warren	
1972	Beware! The Blob	Scoutmaster Adleman	
1972	Joe Kidd	hotel manager	
1972	Dirty Little Billy	Berle's customer	
1972	Snowball Express	Mr. Carruthers	
1973	Soylent Green	usher #1	
1973	Westworld	banker	
1973	Superdad	Ira Kushaw	
1975	The Strongest Man in the World	V.P. Harry Crumply	
1976	Treasure of Matecumbe	The Gambler	
1976	Gus	Cal Wilson	
1976	The Shaggy D.A.	Raymond	
1976	Freaky Friday	Harold Jennings	
1977	High Anxiety	Dr. Wentworth	
1979	Nutcracker Fantasy	King Goodwin	voice
1981	Lunch Wagon	Bernie Simmons	uncredited
1987	Spaceballs	King Roland	
1988	The New Adventures of Pippi Longstocking	Greg the Glue Man	
1989	Dirty Tennis	himself	short film written by his son James Van Patten
1992	Body Trouble	Max	
1992	Final Embrace	Larch	
1993	Robin Hood: Men in Tights	The Abbot	
1996	For Goodness Sake II	game show host	
1996	Love Is All There Is	Dr. Rodino	
1998	Evasive Action	parole officer	
1999	Y2K – World in Crisis	host	documentary
2002	Groom Lake	Irv Barnett	
2003	Dickie Roberts: Former Child Star	himself	
2004	Quiet Kill	Frank Rubin	
2008	The Christmas Conspiracy	narrator	short
2009	Opposite Day	Jack Benson	
2009	Sarah's Choice	Pastor Smith	direct-to-video
2010	First Dog	himself	
2016	Silver Skies	Himself	released posthumously

=== Television ===
Year	Title	Role	Notes
1949–1957	Mama	Nels Hansen	
1958	The Silent Service	Hadley	episode: "Tiger Shark". Executive Officer of the subject submarine.
1958	Mickey Spillane's Mike Hammer	Paul Sterovsky	episode: "The Broken Frame"
1959	Rawhide	Matt Reston	episode: "Incident of the Power and the Plow"
1961	Naked City	Carhop	episode: "The Well-Dressed Termite"
1961–1962	Young Doctor Malone	Larry Renfrew	
1970	The Governor & J.J.	Bertram Bannister	
1970	I Dream Of Jeannie	Grocery store manager	season 5, episode 26; "My Master, the Chili King"; Air date: May 26, 1970; series finale
1970	That Girl	Mr. Morse	
1970	Arnie	Walter Granscog/Walker	
1971	Great Performances	Raymond	
1971–1972	The Partners	Sgt. Nelson Higgenbottom	
1971–1972	The Doris Day Show	April's Father	
1971–1973	Love, American Style		segments: "Love and the Tattoo", "Love and the Parent's Sake" (George), "Love and the Particular Girl" (Jack)
1972	Sanford and Son	Hamlin	episode: "The Great Sanford Siege"
1972	The Don Rickles Show	David	
1972	Hec Ramsey	Earl Enright	
1972	Banyon	Earl Gifford	
1972–1973	The Paul Lynde Show	Dr. Willis/Wollner	
1972–1974	The New Dick Van Dyke Show	Max Mathias/Mr. Compton	
1972–1975	Medical Center	Dr. Feldman/Dr. Whittaker/Man at Hotel	
1972–1976	Emergency!	Carter Merkle/Morris Meers	
1972–1976	The Streets of San Francisco	Thurman Barber/John Collins/Sterling	
1973	McMillan & Wife	Henry	
1973	The Brian Keith Show	Jerry Mason	
1973	Cannon	George Abel	2x18 Murder for Murder
1973	Thicker than Water	John	
1973	Adam's Rib	Commissioner Hoyt	
1973	Wait Till Your Father Gets Home		
1973–1975	The Rookies	Fullmer/Waldon	
1973–1983	Insight	Jerry	
1974	Chopper One	Arnie Nolan	
1974	Banacek	Donald Morgan	
1974	The Girl with Something Extra	Morgan	
1974	Sierra	Ed	
1974	Kolchak: The Night Stalker	Alfred Brindle	
1974	Adam-12	Harry Curtis	season 7, episode 9; "Alcohol" Air date: December 10, 1974
1974–1976	Barnaby Jones	Melvin Pearson/Merle Overton	
1975	Hot l Baltimore	A.J. Horn	
1975	When Things Were Rotten	Friar Tuck	
1975–1976	The Six Million Dollar Man	Harry Green/Palmer	
1976	Ellery Queen	Billy Geeter	
1976	Phyllis	Walter	
1976	Maude	Gordon Coleman	
1976	The New Adventures of Wonder Woman	Jack Wood	episode: "Beauty on Parade"
1976	What's Happening!!	Mr. Claxton	
1976	The Tony Randall Show	Myron C. Dobbs	
1976–1977	Happy Days	Asst. Principal Marvin Conners/Hunsberger	
1977	C.P.O. Sharkey	Psychiatrist	
1977	One Day at a Time	Frank	
1977–1981	Eight Is Enough	Tom Bradford	
1978–1984	The Love Boat	Charlie Dillinger/Congressman John Whitcomb/George Hayes	
1979	Diary of a Teenage Hitchhiker	Herb Thurston	TV movie
1982	High Powder	Tom Reed	TV movie
1982	Andy Williams New England Christmas	himself	TV special
1983–1985	Hotel	Frasier Pratt/Herbert Pitts	
1984	The Hoboken Chicken Emergency	Mayor	TV movie
1984	Masquerade		
1984	Finder of Lost Loves	Alan Nettles	
1984	The New Mike Hammer	Judge Charles Bamer	
1985	Crazy Like a Fox		
1985	The Midnight Hour	Martin Grenville	TV movie
1986	Murder, She Wrote	District Atty. Fred Whittaker	episode: "Murder in the Electric Cathedral"
1986	Combat Academy	Principal	
1987	The Facts of Life	Frank Stickle	episode: "Ex Marks the Spot"
1987	Eight Is Enough: A Family Reunion	Tom Bradford	TV movie
1987	Rags to Riches	Phil Johnson	
1989	Growing Pains	Nick Simpson	episode: "Fortunate Son"
1989	An Eight Is Enough Wedding	Tom Bradford	TV movie
1989	Jake Spanner, Private Eye	The Commodore	TV movie
1990	McGee and Me!	Graham	
1990–1991	WIOU	Floyd Graham	
1993	The Golden Palace	Taylor	
1993	The Odd Couple Together Again	Roy	TV movie
1993	Diagnosis: Murder	Monty Emerson	episode: "Murder at the Telethon"
1994	Burke's Law	Dr. Paul Hampton	
1994	Baywatch	Henry/Sam	episode: "Guys and Dolls"
1994	Lois & Clark: The New Adventures of Superman	Orphanage Worker/Santa	episode: "Season's Greedings"
1995	Cybill	Himself	episode: "Nice Work If You Can Get It"
1995–1998	Touched by an Angel	Jerry/Eb	2 episodes
1996	Maybe This Time	Jack	
1996	Boy Meets World	Amish Farmer	episode: "You Can Go Home Again"
1997	The Weird Al Show	The Burglar	episode: "Al Gets Robbed"
1998	The Love Boat: The Next Wave	Sid Glacken	
1998	Beyond Belief: Fact or Fiction	Chester	segment: "The Chess Game"
1999	Family Guy	Tom Bradford (voice)	episode: "Brian: Portrait of a Dog"
1999	Late Night with Conan O'Brien	Mr. Ropely	
2001	Gary & Mike	Ba (voice)	
2003	Life with Bonnie	Himself	episode: "It's a Wonderful Job"
2004	7th Heaven	James Rodgers Sr.	episode: "The Chess Game"
2005	Arrested Development	Cal Cullen	episodes: "Spring Breakout" and "Righteous Brothers"
2006	That '70s Show	Murph	episode: "Sweet Lady"
2009	The Sarah Silverman Program	Dr. Eddie Hackmeyer	
2011	Hot in Cleveland	Lester	episode: "The Chess Game"

=== Music videos ===
Year	Title	Role	Notes
1992	Smells Like Nirvana	Himself	
1993	Bedrock Anthem	Himself	

== Bibliography ==
- Van Patten, Dick; Baer, Robert (2009). Eighty Is Not Enough!: One Actor's Journey Through American Entertainment. Beverly Hills, Calif.: Phoenix Books. ISBN 978-1607477006.
