= The People Next Door (1996 film) =

- Genre: Drama; Thriller
- Written by: Fred Mills
- Directed by: Tim Hunter
- Starring: Faye Dunaway; Michael O'Keefe; Nicollette Sheridan; Tracey Ellis
- Music by: David Mansfield
- Country of origin: United States
- Original language: English

Production
- Executive producers: Steve Tisch; Jack Nasser
- Producer: Michael O. Gallant
- Production location: Austin, Texas
- Cinematography: Robert M. Stevens
- Editor: Howard E. Smith
- Running time: 120 minutes
- Production companies: Nasser Entertainment Group; Nasser Group; The Steve Tisch Company

Original release
- Network: CBS
- Release: October 1, 1996

The People Next Door is a CBS 1996 American crime drama television film starring Faye Dunaway, Michael O'Keefe, Nicollette Sheridan and Tracey Ellis. It was written by Fred Mills and directed by Tim Hunter. The telecast had 16.6 million viewers on its original airdate.

== Plot ==
The film opens with Wyoming couple Garrett and Donna James frantically searching for the couple's young daughter, Megan, who has gone missing during a camping trip in the mountains. A year later, Anna Morse has just left her abusive husband, Jimmy, and moved to Albuquerque, New Mexico with her three daughters to make a fresh start and establish a career, despite the disapproval of her mother, Ellen. Once there, she makes the acquaintance of Garrett and Donna, who happen to be her neighbors and soon take an interest in Anna's children.

Determined to make the girls their own, the couple begins scheming for ways to snatch Anna's girls away from her; at one point, Garrett and Donna offer to give her a vacation to Mexico that they had won and look after the kids, but Anna declines. One day, while all of them are enjoying a picnic in a neighborhood park, Garrett offers to treat the kids to a ride on a miniature train, and as Anna is purchasing tickets on the other side of the park, Garrett suddenly remembers having left a dessert at the house, and asks the girls to go with him back to the house to retrieve it. Oldest and youngest girls Billie and Sally agree, but Anna's middle daughter Laura elects to remain at the park. Upon Anna's return, she finds two of her girls gone, and unsuccessfully attempts to find them.

Anna shows up at the police station with Laura, but is angry over being treated as a suspect in her girls' disappearance, and storms out prematurely. However, Lt. Jack Dekker does some digging into the background of Anna's neighbors, and shows up at her house the next day to reveal that Garrett and Donna have a history of breaking the law, as well as the matter of what happened to their daughter. This time, Anna agrees to take a polygraph, which she passes with flying colors and convinces Lt. Dekker that the couple were indeed responsible for kidnapping Anna's children. Beginning to suspect Garrett and Donna may well have crossed state lines by now, he suggests that the FBI become involved.

Ellen tells Anna that she should take temporary custody of Laura while she attempts to find her other girls, and warns her daughter that if she doesn't get her life together, she won't be able to make that happen. Initially disagreeing, Anna comes to realize she needs to change how she lives, and agrees to relinquish Laura to her mother until the search is over.

Having driven to a cabin they own in Michigan, Garrett tells Billie that in a fit of rage, Anna struck Laura for misbehaving, causing her to fall down a flight of stairs and breaking her neck, which supposedly killed her and resulted in Anna being sent to jail. He then says that if the girls return to New Mexico, they will be placed in foster care, but promises that he and Donna will take care of the girls and make them happy.

In the meantime, Anna has managed to land a job as a waitress in her mother's restaurant, but is evicted from her house after not paying rent for two months, and winds up sleeping on a park bench. Not long after, Garrett, Donna and the girls (who are now referring to the couple as "Mom" and "Dad") relocate to Tennessee, where Billie and Sally get their hair cut and dyed and are renamed "Rachel" and "Diane", respectively.

Continuing the investigation, Lt. Dekker and Anna visit a trailer park where Garrett and Donna once lived, and are informed by their former neighbor that Garrett was known to be both verbally and physically abusive toward his wife and daughter, which scares Anna, who had thought that the couple would at least treat her daughters well. The following day, while sleeping on her bench, she is spotted by her co-worker Roz, who is on a morning run through the park and generously offers to let Anna stay with her until she gets on her feet.

While working at a grocery store, Donna spots pictures of Billie and Sally on a milk carton, which triggers a flashback to a confrontation Megan had with Garrett, calling him out for his thievery and refusing to move again. Realizing her husband may well have killed their daughter by pushing her off the mountain, she becomes fearful for the girls' safety.

One night, while watching TV, Anna comes across a vintage rockabilly performance, which generates a brainstorm. She leaves a message for Lt. Dekker, and when he arrives in the morning, Anna explains that Garrett is a huge fan of oldies music, and that he and Donna would often drive around the Southwest to find clubs that specialized in rock-and-roll revival shows. Thus, she reasons, they should circulate his poster to clubs of that nature across the country. In the meantime, Anna has amassed enough money to find a new home (a converted barn) for herself and Roz, who toasts the occasion and expresses hope that the girls will soon be found.

A short time later, one of the teachers at Billie's school in Pueblo, Colorado contacts Anna after recognizing her daughter from the "MISSING" poster, but by the time Anna gets there, the couple has already left town with the girls and relocated to Denver; by now, Donna has acknowledged that what they're doing is wrong, and secretly contacts Anna offering to return the girls, but specifies that no police be present. Despite Lt. Dekker's objections, Anna promises to keep the situation under control and not destroy their investigation.

While stopping into a club to by tickets for another oldies show, Garrett is recognized from his "WANTED" poster by the clerk, who gets shot to death before he can take any action. Following the murder, Garrett then heads to a sporting goods store to purchase sleeping bags, some rope, and a hunting knife. Meanwhile, Donna arranges to meet Anna at a local coffee shop (where, for the first time, she admits that it was Garrett who killed Megan, as well as being terrified of her husband), then take her to their house to get her girls back.

However, Garrett gets home first, and after Sally spills the beans about the plans, Garrett puts the girls in the station wagon and tears out only seconds after Donna and Anna pull up. Wanting to see her mom, Billie attempts to grab the steering wheel, causing Garrett to lose control of the car and causing a minor accident. At this point, Sally runs free, but Garrett grabs Billie and prepares to strangle her. Only seconds before he can do so, however, he is arrested at gunpoint by Lt. Dekker, who has been watching the scene unfold from a distance.

While Sally is happy to be reunited with her mother, Billie is angry over Anna allegedly killing Laura, but Anna tells her that Garrett lied to her, and Laura is safe and sound. Softening, Billie recalls how she kept from forgetting her mother: by remembering their day together in the park. At this point, she tells Anna, "Mama, I want to be Billie again", and runs to her mother's arms as the film ends.
