= Dangerous Lies (2020 film) =

2020 American psychological thriller film

- Official poster
- Directed by: Michael Scott
- Written by: David Golden
- Produced by: Margaret H. Huddelston; Stephanie Slack; Michael Scott; Harvey Kahn; David Golden; Bianca Versteego
- Starring: Camila Mendes; Jessie T. Usher; Jamie Chung; Cam Gigandet; Sasha Alexander; Elliott Gould
- Cinematography: Ronald Richard
- Edited by: Alison Grace
- Music by: James Jandrisch
- Production company: Off Camera Entertainment
- Distributed by: Netflix
- Release date: April 30, 2020
- Running time: 96 minutes
- Country: United States
- Language: English

Dangerous Lies is a 2020 American psychological thriller film, directed by Michael Scott from a screenplay by David Golden. It stars Camila Mendes, Jessie T. Usher, Jamie Chung, Cam Gigandet, Sasha Alexander and Elliott Gould.

When the wealthy elderly Leonard dies and unexpectedly leaves his estate to his new caregiver Katie, she and her husband Adam enter a dangerous world that, for them to be able to survive, they will have to question everyone's motives - even of the people she loves.

The film was released on April 30, 2020, by Netflix. In October 2020, Dangerous Lies was nominated for People's Choice Awards in the drama movie category.

== Plot ==
Katie and Adam are a young married couple struggling to pay their bills. Katie works as a waitress while Adam is going to school. One night, an attempted robbery takes place in the diner where Katie works, but Adam manages to fight off the robber.

Katie finds another job as a caregiver for Leonard, an elderly wealthy man who grows close to her. After she tells him about her financial struggles, Leonard insists on helping her out with money, but Katie convinces him to give Adam a job as his gardener instead.

One day, Mickey Hayden, claiming to be a real estate agent, tells Katie that a client is interested in buying the house. When Katie tells him it is not for sale, he starts to watch the couple closely. Soon after, Leonard writes Katie a $7,000 check. She does not want to accept it, but Adam convinces her to use it to pay the bills that are due and pay back Leonard the rest.

The next day, Katie and Adam arrive at Leonard's home to find him dead, leaving Katie devastated. The couple find a large amount of cash in a trunk and, after a small dispute, agree to keep it without notifying the police. At Leonard's funeral, they learn from his lawyer, Julia, that Leonard left his estate and all his possessions to Katie.

Katie and Adam move into Leonard's house, but are again pursued by the highly motivated Hayden, who threatens Katie. At the same time, Detective Chesler becomes suspicious of Adam, and starts to investigate Leonard's death and the robbery at the diner.

After talking to the detective, Katie becomes suspicious of Adam. Wanting to confront him, she searches the entire property and ends up finding a secret room in a shed. She then finds Ethan (Leonard's previous gardener) long dead of a gunshot wound with a bag of diamonds. Adam looks into Hayden and discovers he was recently released from prison for stealing over three million in diamonds, realises Ethan was Hayden's partner in crime, and Hayden killed him to get his share of the diamonds.

Ethan, mortally wounded, had fled to Leonard’s house, where he died. Hayden knows the diamonds must be hidden somewhere on the property, so is eager to find them. Adam tells Katie about their impending danger, so they decide to flee together with the cash they had found in the attic. While Adam is getting ready, Hayden shows up and holds Katie at gunpoint, demanding the diamonds.

Hayden and Adam exchange gunfire, and both are killed. Julia arrives, and Katie tells her that Hayden was the one who killed Leonard with an overdose of his medication. Julia reaches for Hayden's gun and holds Katie at gunpoint, revealing that she had been Hayden's public defender and is part of the plot. She demands the diamonds, but Katie tells her that Adam hid them somewhere, and she does not know where. Chesler arrives in time and shoots Julia dead.

Four months later, Chesler tells a pregnant Katie that for the record, only Hayden and Julia are implicated in the final report. And, although they searched for the diamonds in the house, they never found them. In the last shot, Katie turns the sprinklers on and leaves the garden. The water moves the soil aside, and the diamonds are shown to be buried under a tree, something Adam had hinted at as he died.

== Cast ==
- Camila Mendes as Katie
- Jessie T. Usher as Adam
- Jamie Chung as Julia
- Cam Gigandet as Mickey Hayden
- Sasha Alexander as Detective Chesler
- Elliott Gould as Leonard

== Production ==
In April 2019, it was announced Camila Mendes had signed to star in the film, with Michael Scott directing from a screenplay by David Golden, and Netflix distributing. In May 2019, Jessie T. Usher, Jamie Chung, Cam Gigandet, Sasha Alexander and Elliott Gould joined the cast.

Principal photography began in April 2019. and took place in Vancouver.

== Release ==
The film was released on April 30, 2020.

== Reception ==
On the review aggregator website Rotten Tomatoes, 24% of 29 critics' reviews are positive, with an average rating of 4.3/10. The website's consensus reads: "Energetic enough to be diverting but too mediocre to be memorable, Dangerous Lies feigns erotic thrills without ever really working up a sweat." Metacritic, which uses a weighted average, assigned the film a score of 51 out of 100, based on 7 critics, indicating "mixed or average" reviews.

David Rooney, at The Hollywood Reporter, felt the film was "riddled with dumb logic", and that the "cast is quite capable, though seldom much more than that." Justin Kirkland, for the review in Esquire, called it an "incoherent murder mystery" that "stumbled... clunkily through 90 minutes of flimsy narrative", though tearing apart the mess – right down to realizing that "the cut and size of these diamonds are about as valuable as a packet of geranium seeds" – unintentionally made watching it "a treat".

In a slightly more favourable review, Nick Allen, writing at RogerEbert.com, gave the film two-and-a-half stars out of four, saying that it "looks strikingly good—starting with swift, neon-tinged introductory shots... something that’s then continually affirmed with inspired framing and camera movement throughout".
