= Winston M. Scott =

American CIA officer (1909–1971)

Winston Mackinley Scott (30 March 1909 – 26 April 1971) was an American Central Intelligence Agency officer who served as Mexico City station chief from 1956 to 1969, having joined the Office of Strategic Services in 1943 from the Federal Bureau of Investigation.

== Background ==
Scott was born in Jemison, Alabama, in 1909. He attended the University of Alabama and obtained a PhD in algebra from the University of Michigan, teaching mathematics for six years alongside his studies. He was approached by the Federal Bureau of Investigation after publishing an article on the use of matrices in coded communications.

== Career ==
Scott joined the FBI in March 1941. Originally assigned to the Cryptography division, he asked to become a Special Agent. He was sent to spy on the German population in Pittsburgh, and in February 1943 loaned to the US Embassy in Cuba. After returning to Washington, D.C. he was recruited by the Office of Strategic Services and assigned to London, where he became head of the Germany section of X-2 (OSS' Counter Espionage Branch).

After the end of World War II Scott remained stationed in London, becoming the CIA's first London station chief in 1947. In 1950 he became head of the Western European division of the Office of Special Operations, overseeing espionage throughout Western Europe.

=== Mexico station chief ===
In 1955 Scott asked for a transfer to Mexico City, and took office as station chief there in August 1956, becoming "a virtual proconsul" (the real power behind the throne). In December 1958 he launched Operation LITEMPO recruiting agents and collaborators, and gained then Mexican President Adolfo López Mateos as well as future presidents Gustavo Díaz Ordaz and Luis Echeverría. Scott remained in Mexico until his retirement in 1969, a period that included recording Lee Harvey Oswald's visit to the Cuban and Soviet embassies in Mexico (between Sept.27 and Oct. 2nd, 1963), the rise of the People's Guerrilla Group in Mexico, the 1968 Tlatelolco students massacre and the eve of the Mexican Dirty War (the Mexican theatre of the cold war). He was pushed into retirement due to a new CIA policy on rotating staff. He was awarded the Distinguished Intelligence Medal.

== Death and legacy ==
Two years after leaving the CIA, in 1971, Scott was preparing a book with his memoirs and discussed them with John R. Horton (Mexico station chief, 1971-1974). Scott died on April 26, 1971, two days before a meeting with the CIA director, Richard Helms, to discuss the contents of his memoir. No autopsy was performed; it is suggested he had suffered a heart attack.

After his death, the CIA seized Scott's personal papers, including an audio tape recording of Lee Harvey Oswald and the manuscript of his memoirs which he had firmly intended to publish. The manuscript was returned to Scott's son in the 1980s, with everything after 1947 removed; some of the missing chapters were later released following his lawsuit against the CIA.

In 2008, a book based on Winston M. Scott's memoirs was finally published by Jefferson Morley, under the title: Our Man in Mexico - Winston Scott and the Hidden History of the CIA.
