= Oubliette (The X-Files) =

- The X-Files episode
- Episode no.: Season 3 Episode 8
- Directed by: Kim Manners
- Written by: Charles Grant Craig
- Production code: 3X08
- Original air date: November 17, 1995
- Running time: 45 minutes

Guest appearances
- Tracey Ellis as Lucy Householder; Michael Chieffo as Carl Wade; Jewel Staite as Amy Jacobs; Ken Ryan as Agent Walter Eubanks

Episode chronology
← Previous "The Walk"	Next → "Nisei"
- The X-Files season 3

"Oubliette" is the eighth episode of the third season of the American science fiction television series The X-Files, and originally aired on the Fox network on November 17, 1995. Written by Charles Grant Craig and directed by Kim Manners, "Oubliette" is a "monster of the week" story, unconnected to the series' wider mythology. It earned a Nielsen rating of 10.2, and was watched by 15.90 million people on its initial broadcast. The episode received positive reviews. Both the emotional nature of the story and David Duchovny's performance received positive critical attention.

The show centers on FBI special agents Fox Mulder (Duchovny) and Dana Scully (Gillian Anderson) who work on cases linked to the paranormal, called X-Files. Mulder is a believer in the paranormal, while the skeptical Scully has been assigned to debunk his work. In the installment, a teenager named Amy is kidnapped and imprisoned by a mentally unstable photographer. Mulder discovers a psychic connection between the recently kidnapped victim and Lucy, another girl kidnapped by the same man years ago. He attempts to use the connection to help solve the investigation, but discovers that the event may be too traumatic for Lucy to handle.

"Oubliette" is the only X-Files screenplay written by Craig, who exited the writing staff before the entry was produced. The extensive outdoor filming led to several difficulties for the production crew. Amy was 12 years old in the original screenplay. The Fox network was concerned her situation was an uncomfortable parallel to the recent Polly Klaas case, resulting in her age being increased before filming could begin. Critics have complimented the thematic resonance of the kidnapping and its effect on Mulder.

== Plot ==
In Seattle, photography assistant Carl Wade (Michael Chieffo) watches as 15-year-old Amy Jacobs (Jewel Staite) is photographed for school picture day. He becomes obsessed with her following the event, eventually kidnapping her. Her younger sister is the only witness to the incident, which takes place in their bedroom in the middle of the night. At exactly the same time, fast food worker Lucy Householder (Tracey Ellis) collapses with a nosebleed. Agent Fox Mulder (David Duchovny) investigates Amy's disappearance, drawn to the case because his younger sister, Samantha, was kidnapped in a similar situation. The investigation leads Mulder to Lucy, who was taken from her bedroom at age eight, twenty two years before, and held in a dark basement for five years before she escaped.

Mulder's partner Dana Scully (Gillian Anderson) suspects that Lucy may be connected to Amy's disappearance, based on her long criminal record and the fact that her nosebleed contained not only her blood type, but Amy's as well. In her room at a halfway house, scratches appear on Lucy's face and she experiences temporary blindness—injuries identical to Amy's, who is being tortured in the basement of Wade's cabin. The two develop an unexplainable psychic connection; everything that happens to Amy physically also happens to Lucy. Mulder tries to convince Lucy that she can help them find Amy, but she is too afraid to assist. Scully informs Mulder of their new lead in the case, the school photography assistant Wade, who was recently fired under strange circumstances. Mulder is adamant that Lucy, who admits that Wade was the man who abducted her, is not part of the kidnapping, and snaps at Scully when she suggests that Samantha's disappearance is causing him to become too involved with the case.

The investigation team receives a tip from a tow truck driver concerning Wade's location, which corresponds to the area where Lucy was found years ago. They find Wade's cabin in the woods near Easton, Washington, discovering Lucy in the basement with no clear indication of how or why she came there. Lucy begins to feel cold and wet; Mulder deduces that because of Lucy's connection to Amy, she must be at the local river. Mulder and Scully rush there to find Wade attempting to drown Amy. Back with the police, Lucy begins to drown despite not even being near water. Mulder shoots Wade while Scully attempts to perform CPR on Amy, but because of the connection it resuscitates Lucy instead. Amy lies on the riverbank, dead. Mulder continues to attempt CPR, despite Scully's protests.

Suddenly, the process is reversed; Amy recovers and Lucy dies. Overwhelmed by Lucy's sacrifice and his inability to save her, Mulder breaks down sobbing over her body. He later tells Scully he suspects that she died not only to save Amy, but to forget what Wade did to her all those years ago.

== Production ==
=== Writing ===
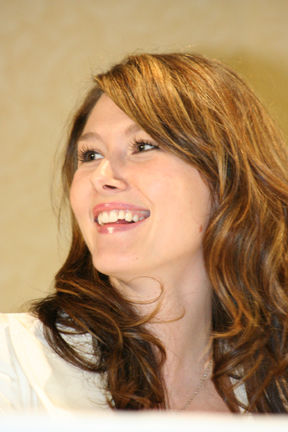
The producers thought that Jewel Staite—who was only 13 at the time—looked old enough to play the role of a 15-year-old girl.

The screenplay for "Oubliette" was authored by Charles Grant Craig, a writer who at the time had little background or experience within television. Before joining the writing staff of The X-Files during the third season, his most significant writing credits included episodes for Renegade and Booker. His most notable television screenplay was The New Alfred Hitchcock Presents entry "Final Escape". Though Craig left the staff shortly before "Oubliette" entered production for unknown reasons, he was credited as a supervising producer on several installments for the third season. The title was derived from the French word "oubliette", which is a pit-like dungeon that is only accessible through a hole in its top.

The narrative centers on Mulder's identification with Lucy which is based on the abduction of his sister, Samantha. It was decided that time would not be spent on Scully's sympathy with the victim, despite her own abduction experience in the second season episode "Ascension". Though not originally included in the script, David Duchovny added the line about how his connection to the case was not just because of Samantha.

Series creator Chris Carter stated that in Craig's original draft Lucy was more "hard-boiled", but actress Tracey Ellis played her as a more wounded person. Fox's standards and practices department was uncomfortable with the screenplay, because it featured a 12-year-old girl being kidnapped. The network requested that she be in her late teens and that the plot would not heavily feature Amy's ordeal or suffering. Jewel Staite had just turned 13 when she was cast, but the producers thought that she looked older and even applied make-up to add to that effect.

The reason for the concern was because the original screenplay featured similarities to the Polly Klaas case, which had received large public attention around the time of production. Polly Klaas was a 12-year-old girl who was kidnapped during a slumber party, and eventually strangled to death. The antagonist of the episode was compared to Richard Allen Davis, the culprit of the case, who was convicted and sentenced to death for his crimes. Ngaire Genge in her book The Unofficial X-Files Companion commented that "tragically, unlike Amy, Klaas didn't survive her abduction".

=== Filming ===
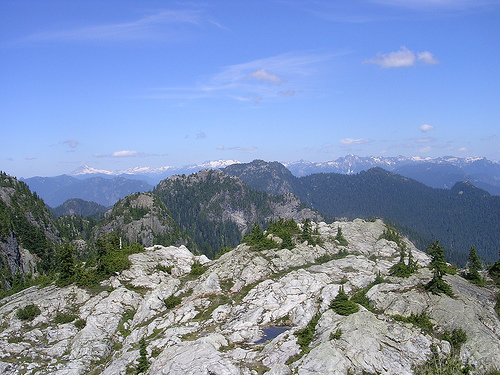
The episode was filmed at Mount Seymour because it was the only location that met all the conditions of the crew.

"Oubliette" was shot in Vancouver, British Columbia, as were the rest of the episodes of the third season. The location of the antagonist's house was an important factor during production. Craig's screenplay called for a remote house in the "middle of nowhere", but the producers required a site closer to the studio. With a production crew consisting of 60 members, it was decided to use somewhere that could appear "rustic while being next to a parking lot." A suitable area was found near the peak of Mount Seymour, a location that had previously been used in "Ascension". The mountain featured both a parking lot and a log cabin that met the needs of the filming crew. An issue arose because the mountain had a ski lift, which needed to be avoided while composing shots. Over 1000 prop trees had to be brought to the filming site to camouflage surroundings, to give the atmosphere a "remote" feel.

The crew encountered a larger issue with the contract with the Provincial Park committee. The park required a seven-day notice before filming of any kind was approved. The production manager had to contact the park Representative directly, who assured him that their needs would be met. For the final sequence, both the Capilano River and Lynn Headwaters were considered; however, the Seymour River was ultimately chosen because it was the safest filming location. The filming of the episode was plagued by rain and heavy weather conditions. In one example, while directing the climax, the river had risen by four or five inches, causing the crew to move to another position to shoot at a week later. This cost the crew several days worth of production and a large sum of money. Shooting conditions were further complicated because shoots involving water are notably difficult, requiring a new set of costumes for each take.

Because of the extensive outdoor shooting, director Kim Manners hated directing the episode, commenting that "it couldn't be fucking worse." Despite a negative experience with shooting on the mountain, the episode "Gethsemane" from the fourth season was filmed there with similar issues. Gillian Anderson's stand-in Bonnie Hay, who appears in a cameo, previously played a doctor in both "Colony" and "End Game" and a nurse in "D.P.O.".

Jewel Staite spoke positively of her co-star Michael Chieffo, saying: "I do remember the man, Michael [Chieffo], who played my kidnapper was so lovely and so concerned that I would feel scared of him, I guess, or uncomfortable around him that he made an effort to be very sweet and warm with me, which my mom appreciated. I think my mom thought [it] was really classy of him."

== Themes ==
The kidnapping of Amy shares several similarities with the abduction of Mulder's sister. Mulder's sister Samantha was abducted by aliens when Mulder was a child, before the timeline of The X-Files. Both Amy and Lucy are kidnapped and victimized by the same abuser, who represents the "logic of duplication". Wade treats both girls in virtually identical ways, kidnapping them and photographing them obsessively in the same manner. David Lavery in Deny All Knowledge asserts that Mulder is capable of seeing beyond "simple equivalents", caring about each individual girl separately. Lavery argues that this grants Mulder the ability to separate the case from his own personal experience with his sister. The scene that best exemplifies this trait is when Mulder attempts to comfort Amy's mother following her daughter's kidnapping. Mulder comments that he "knows how she feels", not because of what happened to his sister, but because he can identify with her general sense of loss. Thematic elements concerning the concept of "remote viewing"—the paranormal ability to perceive feelings from a distance—are later explored in greater detail in the fifth season installment "Mind's Eye".

== Broadcast and reception ==
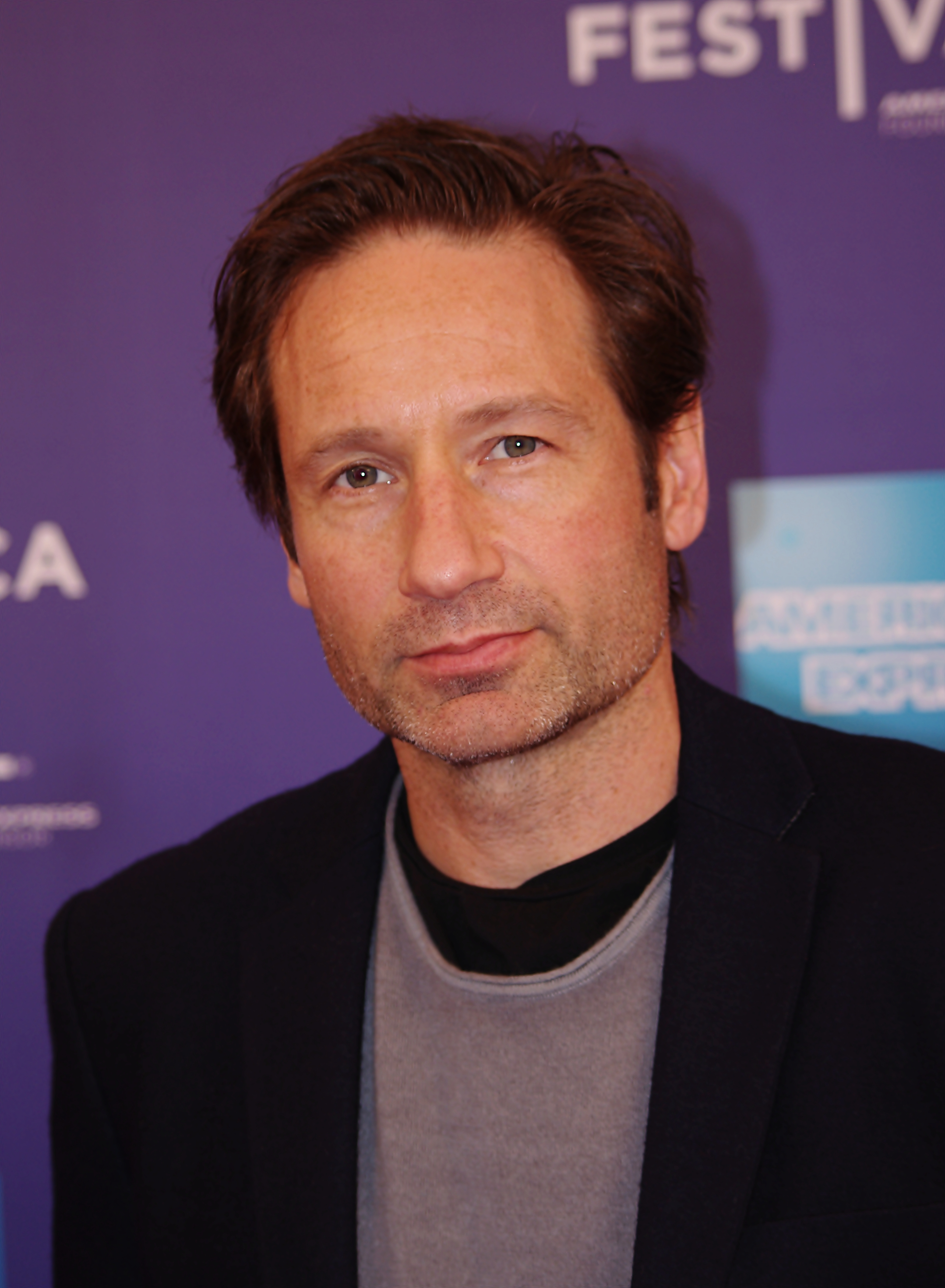
The performance by David Duchovny as Fox Mulder received positive reviews from critics. Several critics viewed that he brought warmth to the character.

"Oubliette" was first broadcast on the Fox network on November 17, 1995. It earned a Nielsen rating of 10.2, with a 17 share, meaning that roughly 10.2 percent of all television-equipped households, and 17 percent of households watching television, were tuned in to the episode. It was watched by a total of 15.90 million viewers.

"Oubliette" received mostly positive reviews from critics. Emily VanDerWerff of The A.V. Club assessed it as a "B+", commenting that it "belongs to a subcategory of X-Files episodes that can often be more satisfying than the usual categories" due to the villain being a human being. She described it as "impressively dark and occasionally moving", and praised the cinematography, editing, and storytelling. However, she was critical of Ellis's performance as Lucy, finding that her characterization did not fit the character, and she noted that the installment fell into the trope of using women as victims. Paula Vitaris from Cinefantastique gave the program three and a half stars out of four. She felt that Mulder and Lucy's relationship was "believable" and, in contrast to VanDerWerff, thought that Ellis's performance was "perfect".

Robert Shearman, in his book Wanting to Believe: A Critical Guide to The X-Files, Millennium & The Lone Gunmen, rated "Oubliette" five stars out of five. While writing that it was a difficult episode to watch, given how closely it paralleled the real world, Shearman wrote that "Oubliette" was "nevertheless one of the series' boldest and greatest achievements". The author praised the depth of Mulder's characterization as well as Duchovny's performance. Entertainment Weekly gave "Oubliette" a grade of "B−", stating that the plot wasn't as scary as it could have been considering the subject matter, positively critiquing that the episode was "worth it for Lucy's channeling sequences". The review also criticized Scully's "aggressive I'm-not-buying-it mode".

Duchovny was particularly pleased with his work in the episode, feeling that it was amongst his best acting performance during the entire run of The X-Files. He later cited the episode as one of his favorites.

== Bibliography ==
- Genge, Ngaire (1995). The Unofficial X-Files Companion. Three Rivers Press. ISBN 978-0517886014.
- Goldman, Jane (1997). X-Files Book of the Unexplained. Harper Paperbacks. ISBN 978-0061053344.
- Gradnitzer, Louisa; Pittson, Todd (2002). X Marks the Spot: On Location With The X-Files. Arsenal Pulp Press. ISBN 978-1551520667.
- Hatfield, James; Butt, George (1997). The Unauthorized X-Cyclopedia: The Definitive Reference Guide to the X-Files. Kensington. ISBN 978-1575662336.
- Kenneth Muir, John (2001). Terror Television: American Series, 1970-1999. McFarland & Company. ISBN 978-0786408900.
- Lavery, David (1995). Deny All Knowledge: Reading the X-Files. Syracuse University Press. ISBN 978-0815604075.
- Lowry, Brian (1995). The Truth is Out There: The Official Guide to the X-Files. Harper Prism. ISBN 978-0-06-105330-6.
- Lowry, Brian (1996). Trust No One: The Official Third Season Guide to The X-Files. Harper Prism. ISBN 978-0061053535.
- M. Lentz, Henry (2001). The Truth is Out There: The Official Guide to the X-Files. McFarland & Company. ISBN 978-0786409426.
- Macintyre, Ken (1996). Reel Vancouver: An insider's guide. Whitecap Books. ISBN 978-1551105062.
- Meisler, Andy (2000). The End and the Beginning: The Official Guide to the X-Files Season 6. HarperCollins. ISBN 978-0-06-107595-7.
- Mitchell, Paul (1996). The Duchovny Files: The Truth Is in Here. ECW Press. ISBN 978-1550222845.
- Shearman, Robert (2009). Wanting to Believe: A Critical Guide to The X-Files, Millennium & The Lone Gunmen. Mad Norwegian Press. ISBN 978-0-9759446-9-1.
