= Run for Your Life (2014 film) =

- Directed by: Michael Scott
- Starring: Amy Smart
- Music by: Jeff Toyne
- Country of origin: United States
- Original language: English

Original release
- Network: Lifetime
- Release: October 4, 2014

Run for Your Life is a 2014 American a television drama film based on a true story for Lifetime. Meredith (Amy Smart) is a battered Canadian woman who flees Canada to escape her abusive husband. She settles in Seattle, but her now-remarried ex-husband finds her. To protect her children, she must choose between killing him herself, hiring someone to kill him, or disappearing with her children and assuming new identities. It is based on Katherine Kotaw's memoir Quicksand: One Woman’s Escape From the Husband Who Stalked Her. The movie shows the events and consequences based on both paths in parallel, with frequent scene switching between the paths.

== Cast ==
- Amy Smart as Meredith Redmond
- Mark Humphrey as Robert Redmond
- Aislyn Watson as Amanda Redmond
- Genea Charpentier as Isabel Beckman
- Lochlyn Munro as Neal
- Lisa Durupt as Annabelle Redmond
