= Mom P.I. =

Canadian television series

- Genre: Comedy-drama
- Created by: Chris Haddock
- Starring: Rosemary Dunsmore; Stuart Margolin; Emily Perkins; Shane Meier
- Country of origin: Canada
- Original language: English
- No. of seasons: 2
- No. of episodes: 26

Production
- Running time: 30 minutes

Original release
- Network: CBC Television
- Release: October 12, 1990 – March 30, 1992

Mom P.I. is a 1990–92 Canadian television comedy-drama series starring Rosemary Dunsmore, Stuart Margolin, Emily Perkins, and Shane Meier. Dunsmore plays eternal optimist Sally Sullivan, a recently widowed mother of two supporting her family as a waitress in a working-class diner, who talks her way into a job as assistant to grumpy, cynical private eye Bernie Fox (Margolin).

The head writer for the show was Chris Haddock, who later created the much grittier Da Vinci's Inquest and Intelligence, also for the CBC.

== Cast ==
- Rosemary Dunsmore as Sally Sullivan
- Stuart Margolin as Bernie Fox
- Emily Perkins as Marie Sullivan
- Shane Meier as Ray Sullivan

== Episodes ==
=== Season 1 (1990–91) ===
No. overall	No. in season	Title	Directed by	Written by	Original release date
1	1	"When Sally Met Bernie"	Brad Turner	Chris Haddock	October 12, 1990
2	2	"Career Moves"	Unknown	Unknown	October 15, 1990
3	3	"Duck Flambé"	Unknown	Unknown	October 22, 1990
4	4	"Murder Maybe"	Unknown	Unknown	October 29, 1990
5	5	"Gumshoe"	Unknown	Unknown	November 5, 1990
6	6	"Undue Influence"	Unknown	Unknown	November 12, 1990
7	7	"Brendan B. Gone"	Unknown	Unknown	November 19, 1990
8	8	"Return to Sender"	Unknown	Unknown	November 26, 1990
9	9	"Looking for a Living"	Unknown	Unknown	December 3, 1990
10	10	"Blue Christmas"	Unknown	Unknown	December 10, 1990
11	11	"Beneath the Pacific"	Unknown	Unknown	January 7, 1991
12	12	"Over the Edge"	Unknown	Unknown	January 14, 1991
13	13	"Spinal Trap"	Unknown	Unknown	January 21, 1991

=== Season 2 (1991–92) ===
No. overall	No. in season	Title	Directed by	Written by	Original release date
14	1	"Safe at Home"	Unknown	Unknown	September 30, 1991
15	2	"A Fist of Fate"	Unknown	Unknown	October 28, 1991
16	3	"Bad to Be Born"	Unknown	Unknown	November 4, 1991
17	4	"Repo Ride"	Unknown	Unknown	November 11, 1991
18	5	"Time Wounds All Heels"	Unknown	Unknown	November 18, 1991
19	6	"Cash and Money"	Unknown	Unknown	November 25, 1991
20	7	"A Fugue for Mr. X"	Unknown	Unknown	December 9, 1991
21	8	"Through a Door Quickly"	Unknown	Unknown	March 16, 1992
22	9	"Night Train"	Unknown	Unknown	March 23, 1992
23	10	"1 For You, 19 For Me"	Unknown	Unknown	March 30, 1992
24	11	"The Shadows"	Unknown	Unknown	April 6, 1992
25	12	"Dig That Grave"	Unknown	Unknown	April 13, 1992
26	13	"I.O.U."	Unknown	Unknown	April 20, 1992
