= Intelligence (Canadian TV series) =

- Created by: Chris Haddock
- Starring: Ian Tracey; Klea Scott; Matt Frewer; John Cassini
- Country of origin: Canada
- Original languages: English, French (Intelligences)
- No. of seasons: 2
- No. of episodes: 25 (+ pilot)

Production
- Executive producers: Chris Haddock; Laura Lightbown
- Production locations: Vancouver, British Columbia
- Running time: 60 minutes

Original release
- Network: CBC
- Release: October 10, 2006 – December 10, 2007

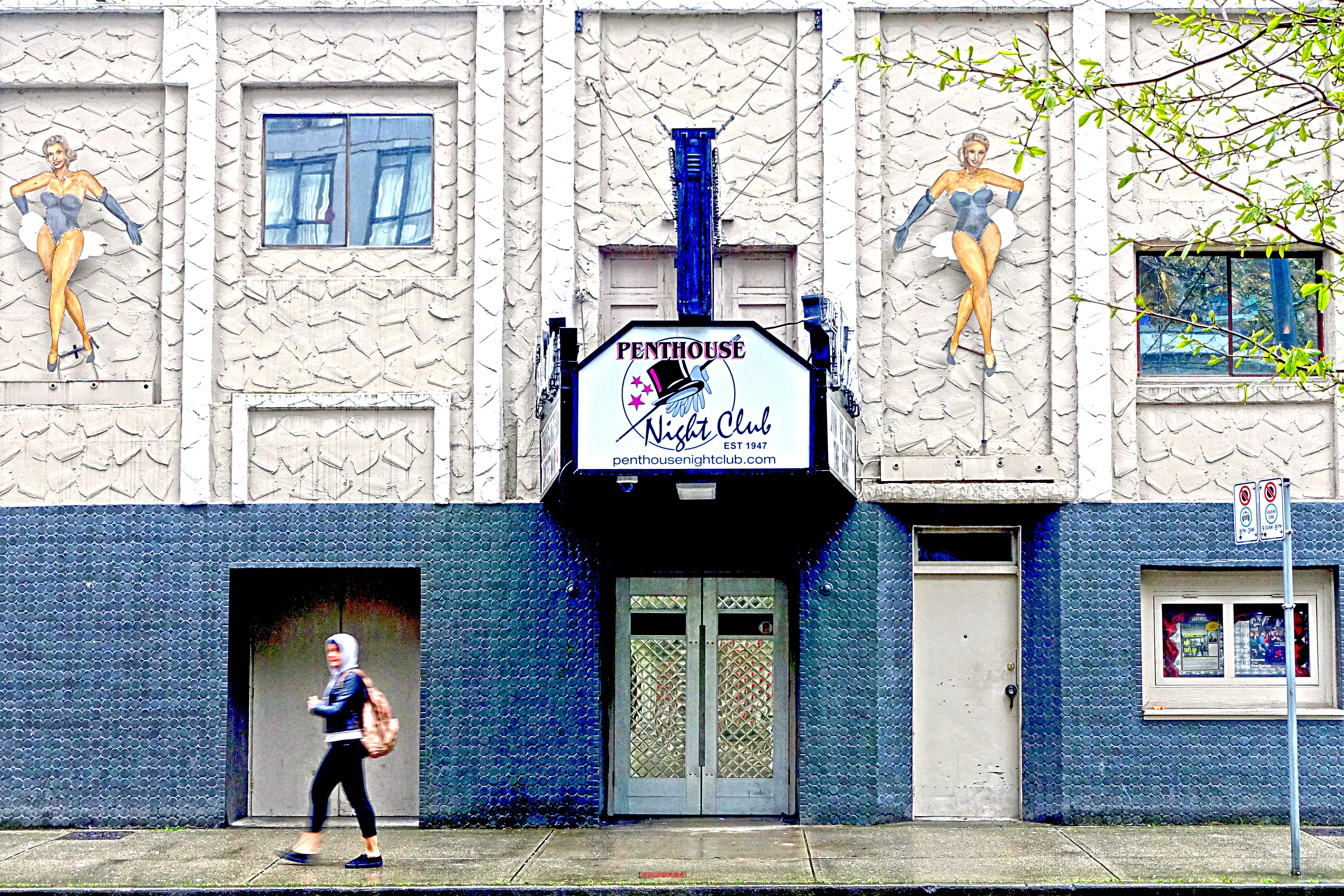
The Penthouse Club (est. 1947) on Seymour Street, Vancouver, 2016, featured as the 'Chick-a-Dee', the headquarters of Jimmy Reardon in Intelligence.

Intelligence is a Vancouver-based crime drama television series created and written by Chris Haddock starring Ian Tracey and Klea Scott that aired on the CBC. With its pilot first airing on November 28, 2005, the series began regular broadcasting on October 10, 2006. CBC reaired the pilot on June 7, 2007 and began broadcasting reruns of season one on Fridays starting on June 8, 2007. A second season then aired from October 2007, concluding in December that same year. The series was produced by Haddock Entertainment, which also produced Da Vinci's Inquest and Da Vinci's City Hall.

Intelligence centres on Jimmy Reardon (Tracey), one of Vancouver's top organized crime bosses, and Mary Spalding (Scott), the director of the Vancouver Organized Crime Unit (OCU), who has offered Reardon immunity from prosecution in exchange for his role as a police informant. The show also stars Matt Frewer as Ted Altman, the scheming assistant director of the OCU who seeks to replace Spalding, and John Cassini as Ronnie Delmonico, Reardon's business partner and confidant.

The show's cast also includes Tom McBeath, John Mann, and David Green as CSIS directors; Eugene Lipinski and Andrew Airlie as colleagues of Spalding; and Bernie Coulson and Camille Sullivan as Reardon's brother and ex-wife.

The show was cancelled in 2008. The cancellation led to allegations that fear of the Harper government played a role in the decision.

== Plot ==
=== Season one ===
Reardon and Spalding are parallel characters working together on opposite sides of the law. Both have followed in the footsteps of their respective families, and both face threats from others trying to derail their careers. Reardon represents the 3rd generation of his west coast crime family that began with his Prohibition-era bootlegging grandfather. Spalding has her roots as the daughter of a former army intelligence officer. Spalding must constantly watch herself against the conniving Assistant Director Altman who is after her position, and the old school CSIS Regional Director Deakins, for whose job she is the leading candidate. For Reardon, it is the Disciples Motorcycle club, led by Dante Ribiso (Fulvio Cecere), whose aim is to control the whole of Vancouver's marijuana trade and ABM money laundering industry.

=== Season two ===
Season two begins with Jim Reardon trapped in a Seattle diner during a DEA setup. Jim attempts to surrender to the Americans, only to end up causing a shoot-out. He flees the scene and goes into hiding. DEA Agent Williams re-arranges the evidence in the diner to make it appear as if Jim is a cop killer. Meanwhile, Ronnie tries to orchestrate a rescue operation to get Jim safely back to Canada. In Mary's world, the American mole Royden has been murdered in his hotel room and Mary scrambles to remain in control of the situation. With Royden out of the way, Mary is appointed head of the Asia Pacific Region of CSIS. Jim finally gets the bank deal set up and attempts to go legitimate but the constant violence of the Vancouver underworld and his affair with Lorna continually drag him further away from his ultimate goal of settling down and raising a family. The series ends with the newly arrived American competition starting a war which concludes with the shooting of Reardon in front of his club.

== Cast and characters ==
- Jimmy Reardon (Ian Tracey): Head of a third generation west coast crime syndicate, Jim Reardon is somewhat of an enigma. He has an unrelenting work ethic and a keen sense for business, which he has used to grow the family business substantially. His grandfather was a Prohibition-era rumrunner and his father was into the heroin trafficking business. Jim's business interests lie in "BC Bud," which is in high demand throughout North America. Jim owns several legitimate businesses, including a trucking company, shipping company and lumber mill. At heart, Jim is a family man and he is a very good father to Stella. His level-headed, calm and gentle yet ruthless personality make him an excellent leader. Being an informer, Jim sometimes questions his own morality.
- Mary Spalding (Klea Scott): The Head of CSIS's Asia Pacific Region, Mary, the daughter of a former military intelligence officer, is by all appearances egotistical, ambitious and self-serving. She is also incredibly brilliant and driven. Mary's zeal to rise up the ladder in life can cause her to overstep her authority. In her personal life, she is less sure-footed. A lonely woman, she dumped her cheating husband and is hesitant to become involved in a romantic relationship, Mary is always the outsider. Despite this, Mary is fiercely charming and very witty, qualities which she uses to win over informants and superiors alike.
- Ted Altman (Matt Frewer): Director of Vancouver's Organized Crime Unit (OCU), Ted Altman is a vicious, mean-spirited, borderline psychopath. An alcoholic, Ted spends much of his day drinking. The rest of the time he is looking for ways to take down Jim Reardon and Dante Ribiso. Highly ambitious and equally ruthless, Ted will stop at nothing to get what he wants, even if it means breaking the law. Outwardly, he appears charming, but underneath the facade, he is as ruthless as both Reardon and Dante.
- Ronnie Delmonico (John Cassini): Owner of the Chick a Dee strip club and Jimmy's business partner, Ronnie is charming, intelligent, sophisticated, gregarious and pragmatic; however, he is also hot-headed and at times, indecisive. Ronnie's father owned the Chick a Dee and with it, he made a name for himself. Ronnie is operations manager of the Reardons' marijuana distribution ring. Ronnie isn't entirely supportive of Jim's decision to inform to Mary, as he believes that Jim is breaking the code of honour among thieves. A born womanizer, Ronnie has been married and divorced at least once; he is now with Sweet, the alpha stripper at the Chick a Dee, and the mother of his unborn child.
- Bob Tremblay (Darcy Laurie): Jim Reardon's chief lieutenant and enforcer, Tremblay was trained as a boxer and special forces recon soldier. He is a calm, calculated and cool guy. Tremblay is surprisingly spiritual.
- Francine Reardon (Camille Sullivan): Jim's ex-wife and the mother of his daughter, Stella, Francine is a force to be reckoned with. An alcoholic and cocaine addict, Francine's demons have gotten the best of her time and again. Recently she has been able to get somewhat clean, but she still has a long way to go. She is intent on getting back together with Jim and will stop at nothing to accomplish her goal. Intensely jealous, Francine savagely guards her status in Jim's life and in doing so, she has become a very dangerous loose cannon.
- Michael Reardon (Bernie Coulson): Jimmy's younger brother, Mike has many qualities that are required to be a successful criminal. However, the trait that he lacks is perhaps the most important: intelligence. Mike is a well-intentioned, yet completely incompetent heroin smuggler and addict, who recently spent time in prison for conspiracy to traffic narcotics. Mike is fiercely loyal to Jimmy, but suspicious and critical of Ronnie. Mike is unable to break from the cycle of addiction that he is trapped in. He also has a hot-headed and violent personality, which makes him unsuitable for the family business. Mike is very musically inclined and he is involved in Vancouver's music scene. He aspires to make his own way in Vancouver's underworld, completely separate from his brother, but don't mistake his aspirations for disloyalty to Jim. Mike would die for his brother.
- Stella Reardon (Sophie Hough): The teenage daughter of Jimmy and Francine. For most of her life, she had no idea that her father was involved in Vancouver's criminal underworld, let alone one of the most powerful criminals the city had ever seen. Stella is witty, intelligent and mature for her age, and her intelligence allowed her to deduce what it was that her father really did for a living.
- Phil Coombs (Shane Meier): Phil is the Reardon family lawyer. Young, sophisticated, connected and extremely talented, Phil is one of Jim's most trusted advisors. His goal, along with Jim's is to turn the Reardon family enterprises and Jimmy himself, legitimate within five years. To accomplish this ambition, Phil and John Hogarty, have pushed Jim and Ronnie to purchase controlling shares of the First National Bank of Ireland, Bahamas Branch. This allows them to wash hundreds of millions of dollars in dirty money per year and it provides money for future projects and business ventures. Wise beyond his years, Phil is a constant source of valuable information due to his connections.
- Dante Ribiso (Fulvio Cecere): Leader of the Disciples, an outlaw motorcycle gang. Dante is very cool-headed and calm, yet incredibly ruthless. He is willing to use extreme violence and intimidation to get his way. Dante is no stranger to killing. His nephew was gunned down by the Vietnamese and he has been responsible for the murders of several of Reardon's allies. Dante and Jim usually get along. There is a lot of bad blood between the Vietnamese and the Disciples.
- Rene Desjardins (Michael Eklund): A narcotics detective with the Vancouver Police Department, Rene is Jim's rat inside the police. A quiet and nervous man, Rene is not exactly an upstanding citizen. He would be more at home working for Jim's criminal enterprise than being a cop, but he is much more valuable as the inside man in the narc squad. Rene usually has to be prodded to reveal the information that he knows. Jim pays him for the information in cash and season tickets to hockey games.
- Phan (Tuan Phan): Leader of the Vietnamese crew, Phan is no stranger to Jim and Ronnie. They do business together and always help each other out when needed. Often at war with the Disciples, and after the unfortunate death of his cousin, Johnny, both Phan and Jim finally make a truce deal with Dante and the Disciples.
- John Hogarty (David Lovgren): John Hogarty is Jim's banker, and as such, he is in control of most of Jim's money and holdings. To better control Hogarty, Jim cultivated in him a love of strippers and cocaine, which has quickly taken over his life. Hogarty's coke addiction makes him an unpredictable and untrustworthy employee. Jim will later come to regret introducing Hogarty to cocaine.
- Lorna Salazar (Leela Savasta):

== Episodes ==
=== TV Movie ===
No. in series	Title	Directed by	Written by	Original release date
Pilot	"Intelligence: The Movie"	Stephen Surjik	Chris Haddock	November 28, 2005

=== Season 1 ===
No. in series	Title	Directed by	Written by	Original release date
101	"Where Good Men Die Like Dogs"	David Frazee	Chris Haddock	October 10, 2006
102	"A Champagne Payday"	Stefan Pleszczynski	Chris Haddock	October 17, 2006
103	"Don't Break Your Brother's Heart"	Stephen Surjik	Chris Haddock	October 24, 2006
104	"Jimmy's Got a Money Machine"	Stefan Pleszczynski	Chris Haddock	October 31, 2006
105	"Where There's One There's Another"	Charles Martin Smith	Chris Haddock	November 7, 2006
106	"Pressure Drop"	Sturla Gunnarsson	Chris Haddock	November 14, 2006
107	"Love and War"	John Fawcett	Chris Haddock	November 21, 2006
108	"Clean and Simple"	Sturla Gunnarsson	Chris Haddock	November 28, 2006
109	"Cleaning Up"	Stuart Margolin	Chris Haddock	December 5, 2006
110	"Things Change"	Ian Tracey	Chris Haddock	December 12, 2006
111	"Not a Nice Boy!"	Stephen Surjik	Chris Haddock	January 9, 2007
112	"Dante's Inferno"	Nicholas Campbell	Chris Haddock	January 16, 2007
113	"Down but not out"	Chris Haddock	Chris Haddock	January 30, 2007

=== Season 2 ===
No. in series	Title	Directed by	Written by	Original release date
201	"A Man Escapes"	Stephen Surjik	Rick Crook, Chris Haddock	October 1, 2007
Reardon is trapped by a DEA setup at a Seattle Diner. In Vancouver, the American mole, Royden is found dead in his hotel room and Mary struggles to remain in control of the situation. The FBI travel to Vancouver to hunt Reardon down on murder charges.
202	"A Man Is Framed"	Stephen Surjik	Rick Crook, Chris Haddock	October 8, 2007
Reardon, who is now a wanted man, manages to return to Canada. He takes refuge on an isolated island with a trusted associate named Raoul. Raoul's niece, Lorna, seduces Jim. Back in Vancouver, and with only a few days to spare before the Off-shore bank meeting, the Reardon banker, Hogarty goes on a drug-fueled bender. Mary is appointed temporary head of the Asia Pacific Region of CSIS. 25 Club, owned by Jim's brother Mike, is firebombed by some of Dante's employees. Mike retaliates against the Disciples.
203	"A Man Underground"	Stefan Pleszczynski	Rick Crook, Chris Haddock	October 15, 2007
Mary, convinced of Jim's innocence, sends Martin to Seattle to question the DEA informant, Morgan about how he supplied Jim with a faulty firearm. Ted, the new Director of the OCU, tries desperately to stop DEA Agent Williams from leaking that he was connected with the disastrous setup in Seattle. The ATM business suffers a substantial setback by a surprise police raid and Ronnie has to procure a loan from Dante. Reardon prepares to flee to Costa Rica when Mary provides Coombs (Reardon's Lawyer) with evidence that clears him.
204	"A Man and a Woman Betrayed"	Stuart Margolin	Rick Crook, Chris Haddock	October 22, 2007
Jim has regained some sense of normalcy to his life. Although the threat of extradition looms over his head, Jim tries to bring some stability back to his business, while simultaneously finalizing the Bahamas bank deal. The banker, Hogarty, is beginning to worry Jim with his erratic and destructive, drug-fueled behaviour. The DEA sting has created a huge vacuum in Jim's U.S. marijuana distribution business. To resolve this issue, Mike suggests that Winston could head up an operation to secure more dope. Bob and Jim are suspicious of Winston and their suspicions soon prove true, as Winston is found to be working with the O.C.U. Meanwhile, Mary is pressured by the Defense Department to use her friendship with an investigative reporter to stop her from releasing a critical report. When one of Katarina's girls is being extorted by an immigration official, Mary sees an opportunity to get an informant in the agency.
205	"Love and Conspiracy"	Stefan Pleszczynski	Rick Crook, Chris Haddock	October 29, 2007
Mary is asked by the Prime Minister's Office to gather information on a Cabinet minister, who is believed to be sharing sensitive intel with his gay lover. At the same time, Reardon learns one of his suppliers is selling to a competitor. To get revenge, he organizes a double-cross that puts this supplier out of business and allows CSIS to make a major drug bust. Jim's source in the Vancouver Narcotics squad, Rene, informs him that a "Rogue" DEA team is in town to kidnap him, or worse...
206	"Something in the Air"	David Frazee	Rick Crook, Chris Haddock	November 5, 2007
When Mary is approached to gather information on a corporate tax-evasion scheme, the last thing she would have thought was that Canada's sovereignty was at risk. As it turns out, the Blackmire group is involved in a plan to steal Canada's fresh-water resources. Ted discovers, through his investigation of Dante, that Jim has sold Dante his ATM business and has acquired an offshore bank in the Bahamas. With the threat of extradition growing more dangerous by the day, Jim moves Francine and Stella into the Chickadee with him. Mary tries to convince Jim that she can ward off extradition by informing the Attorney General of his importance as an informant. Francine has begun to suspect that Jim is having an affair with Lorna.
207	"A Sweetheart Deal with the Devil"	Stephen Surjik	Rick Crook, Chris Haddock	November 12, 2007
Mary becomes worried that if Jim leaves town, chaos will ensue in the Vancouver underworld. Jim, also worried about the possibility for violence upon his departure, convinces Ronnie to sell their eastern connections to their competitors, namely Dante and the Vietnamese. While attempting to stay Jim's extradition, Mary runs into some resistance from both the Attorney General and the Crown. Meanwhile, Juliana, the escort who was being extorted, has become the secretary to the CEO of the Blackmire group. Reardon's bank proves to be a bargaining chip that saves him from extradition. Hogarty, is furious after being bought out and removed from the Bahamas' bank deal by Jim. He arrives at the club with the foolish intent of extorting money from Jim, and he is quickly "taken care of."
208	"Flipping the Script"	Ian Tracey	Rick Crook, Chris Haddock	November 19, 2007
When Ted informs Mary of the impending gang-war, she tries to get Reardon to bring Dante and Phan (the Vietnamese leader) to the bargaining table. However, this proves hard to set up, as there is still bad blood between Dante and the Vietnamese. Juliana causes a major headache for Mary when her reckless behaviour threatens the Blackmire operation. When Reardon finds out that Jordan and his crew of rogue DEA kidnappers are gathering information on his security forces and the Chickadee, he launches his own counter-surveillance operation. Amidst all of this turmoil, Francine confronts Jim about his affair with Lorna and threatens to break up the family.
209	"A Woman Inside"	Stephen Surjik	Rick Crook, Chris Haddock	November 26, 2007
An American crew has moved into town. Reardon believes that Jordan and his Rogue DEA team are involved in the drug trade. The American crew begins selling their weed cheap to attract customers, and they begin buying up large amounts of marijuana from anyone who will sell it to them. Causing Reardon to believe that they are intending to take over the drug distribution business in Vancouver. Meanwhile, the CIA pressures Mary to back off of her Blackmire investigation, but Mary, always the opportunist, sees an opening to position CSIS as a major player in the intelligence game. When Dante's lieutenant is found dead, from a bullet wound, Reardon realizes that the need to get him and Phan to the bargaining table is urgent. Reardon becomes increasingly worried about this American crew, when his surveillance teams put Jordan and the murderer of Dante's man, working together. Francine takes Stella and leaves Reardon. This leaves the way open for Lorna to continue seducing Reardon.
210	"The Heat Is On"	Nicholas Campbell	Rick Crook, Chris Haddock	December 3, 2007
Phan's second in command, is murdered only days after Dante's lieutenant. This convinces Reardon that the Americans are in Vancouver for more than just kidnapping him. Reardon is now convinced that the Americans are in town to take over the illegal drug trade, and remove anyone who stands in their way. When the police cannot apprehend the shooters, Reardon takes matters into his own hands and sets up a meeting with the Americans. Ted's investigation uncovers the bigger picture about Jordan and his men. It appears that Jordan and his crew are involved in many violent takeovers of local drug trades, in numerous foreign countries. It also appears that these takeovers have a U.S. military connection. Meanwhile, the CIA discovers that Juliana is a secretary for the Blackmire group and they want to recruit her. Mary sets it up so that Juliana appears to be working for the CIA, when in reality she is working for CSIS.
211	"A Dark Alliance (Season Finale, Part I)"	Stuart Margolin	Rick Crook, Chris Haddock	December 10, 2007
Just when her Blackmire operation was beginning to be profitable, Mary discovers that the Blackmire group is really a CIA front. Realizing that her career could be seriously jeopardize if she handles this the wrong way, Mary is left contemplating what to do with her new discovery. Julianna begins to crack under the enormous pressure of spying on George Brown, CEO of the Blackmire group. For Reardon all appears to be going well, Dante and Phan met with Ronnie's cousin, the east coast distributor, and the deal is sealed between the three. However, Reardon's good luck comes crashing down, when the American crew refuses to leave the city. Bob discovers that the American crew is connected with the Jordan and his DEA kidnap team. To run the Americans out of town, Reardon and all of the local gangs join in an alliance and boycott the Americans by refusing to sell them marijuana. Ted discovers that Reardon has a man inside the Vancouver Narcotics Unit. He recruits Rene to inform on Reardon. Bob, Ronnie, Dante and Phan are pushing Reardon to go to war with the Americans, but Reardon is hesitant.
212	"We Were Here Now We Disappear (Season Finale, Part II)"	Stephen Surjik	Rick Crook, Chris Haddock	December 10, 2007
Blackmire's public campaign over Canadian water rights has the Prime Minister's office worried. Several prominent Cabinet Ministers are involved with Blackmire, but to launch an official investigation, the PMO would like to first meet Mary's informant (for credibility purposes). George Browne finds out the truth about Julianna and things become very dangerous for her. She has to be sent to Paris for her own protection and now Mary is left in the lurch. Things are no better for Reardon, who solidifies the alliance with Vancouver's drug lords by holding a meeting to discuss the boycott. Meanwhile, the Americans, not being able to sell weed, have moved on to blow (cocaine). The tense situation in Vancouver's underworld seems to have calmed down a bit, when the Americans launch a surprise attack on the Alliance. When the bodies begin piling up and an all-out street war has begun, everyone is in danger, including Reardon. He has another meeting with the Americans and agrees to "cut" them a piece of the street trade. The closing scene of the episode has Reardon, who is on his cell-phone with Stella, his daughter, being hit by the Americans in a drive-by shooting. It appears that he is still alive as the scene fades to black.

== DVD releases ==
Acorn Media has released the entire series on DVD in Region 1.

DVD name	# Eps	Release date
Intelligence: Season One	14	April 29, 2008
Intelligence: Season Two	12	April 14, 2009

== Cancellation ==
On March 7, 2008, the CBC announced that Intelligence would be cancelled.

There were various rumors surrounding the cancellation of the series. Kevin Baker from the National Post alleged:

There's a theory afloat that CBC Television cancelled the unusually good drama Intelligence in fear of upsetting Canada's New Government, which is thought to be slavering for an excuse to junk the nation's public broadcaster and sell off the parts. According to this theory, expounded in the Toronto Star, one story arc of Intelligence showed secret dealings to sell Canadian water to the United States in an unfavourable light. Thus, the plot implicitly criticized the government's secret dealings, under cover of the North American Security and Prosperity Partnership. Loopy? Bonkers? Stark raving? Yes, but wait: The truth is even more fantastic. The CBC was forced to drop Intelligence because of me.

Chris Haddock, the show's creator, commented in an interview one year before the cancellation on how the show received no promotion by the CBC, and on how mention of its awards nominations were left out of a pre-awards show:

I've been told with previous projects that the most effective time to promote is in the two weeks prior to the start of the season. Yet we went into the first two weeks before the show with zero promotion anywhere. That isn't accidental. That is a very well planned 'bury' by someone. It is somebody high up in the food chain who has the power to say, 'Do not mention this show. We were nominated for eleven Geminis. Prior to the Geminis, there was an episode of The Hour about the nominations but there was not one mention of Intelligence. The story became how Little Mosque on the Prairie had not been nominated.

When the show was brought to Netflix in 2017, John Doyle commented in The Globe and Mail:

At the time Intelligence was cancelled by CBC, there was a widespread belief that the theme of political corruption was what got the show killed. In those Harper-era days, the series was in dangerous territory for a beleaguered CBC. The fact that it was superb TV, widely praised, was less important than fear of government criticism.
