= List of Da Vinci's Inquest episodes =

Da Vinci's Inquest is a Canadian a drama television series starring Nicholas Campbell as Dominic Da Vinci, a former police officer who is the Vancouver city coroner. It aired for seven seasons from 1998 to 2005 for a total of 91 episodes. The air dates are given for first airing on CBC Television in Canada.

== Series overview ==
Series	Episodes	Originally released	
Series	Episodes	First released	Last released
1	13	7 October 1998	3 February 1999
2	13	6 October 1999	19 January 2000
3	13	4 October 2000	6 February 2001
4	13	30 September 2001	21 January 2002
5	13	27 October 2002	23 February 2003
6	13	23 November 2003	4 April 2004
7	13	12 October 2004	23 January 2005

== Episodes ==
=== Season 1 (1998–1999) ===
No. overall	No. in season	Title	Directed by	Written by	Original release date
1	1	"Little Sister: Part 1"	Anne Wheeler	Chris Haddock	7 October 1998
2	2	"Little Sister: Part 2"	Anne Wheeler	Chris Haddock	14 October 1998
3	3	"Little Sister: Part 3"	Anne Wheeler	Chris Haddock	21 October 1998
4	4	"The Quality of Mercy"	Stephen Surjik	Chris Haddock & Leonel Luna	28 October 1998
5	5	"Known to the Ministry"	John L'Ecuyer	Peggy Thompson	4 November 1998
6	6	"We All Fall Down"	Alan Simmonds	Alan DiFiore	11 November 1998
7	7	"The Stranger Inside"	John L'Ecuyer	John Hunter	18 November 1998
8	8	"Gabriel"	William Fruet	Chris Haddock & Esta Spalding	25 November 1998
9	9	"The Most Dangerous Time"	Alan Simmonds	John Krizanc	2 December 1998
10	10	"The Bridge"	David Straiton	Esta Spalding	9 December 1998
11	11	"Final Chapter"	Scott Summersgill	Chris Haddock & Alan DiFiore	13 January 1999
12	12	"The Hunt: Part 1"	Stephen Surjik	Chris Haddock & Larry Campbell	27 January 1999
13	13	"The Capture: Part 2"	Chris Haddock	Chris Haddock & Larry Campbell	3 February 1999

=== Season 2 (1999–2000) ===
No. overall	No. in season	Title	Directed by	Written by	Original release date
14	1	"A Cinderella Story: Part 1"	Anne Wheeler	Alan DiFiore, Chris Haddock & Esta Spalding	6 October 1999
15	2	"A Cinderella Story: Part 2"	Anne Wheeler	Alan DiFiore, Chris Haddock & Esta Spalding	13 October 1999
16	3	"The Hanged Man"	Scott Summersgill	Alan DiFiore, Chris Haddock & Esta Spalding	20 October 1999
17	4	"Tommy's on the Corner"	Alan Simmonds	Alan DiFiore, Chris Haddock & Esta Spalding	27 October 1999
18	5	"His Wife"	Scott Summersgill	Alan DiFiore, Chris Haddock & Esta Spalding	3 November 1999
19	6	"Sister's Light"	David Frazee	Alan DiFiore, Chris Haddock & Esta Spalding	10 November 1999
20	7	"A Nice Place in the Country"	Tom Braidwood & Chris Haddock	Alan DiFiore, Chris Haddock & Esta Spalding	17 November 1999
21	8	"Blues in A-minor"	A.J. Vesak	Alan DiFiore, Chris Haddock & Esta Spalding	24 November 1999
22	9	"The Looking Glass"	Lee Knippelberg	Alan DiFiore, Chris Haddock & Esta Spalding	1 December 1999
23	10	"The Lottery"	Tom Braidwood	Alan DiFiore, Chris Haddock & Esta Spalding	8 December 1999
24	11	"Bang Like That"	Stephen Surjik	Larry Campbell	5 January 2000
25	12	"Fantasy"	Chris Haddock	Larry Campbell & Chris Haddock	12 January 2000
26	13	"Reality"	Tom Braidwood & Chris Haddock	Larry Campbell & Chris Haddock	19 January 2000

=== Season 3 (2000–2001) ===
No. overall	No. in season	Title	Directed by	Written by	Original release date
27	1	"That's the Way the Story Goes"	Stephen Surjik	Frank Borg, Alan DiFiore, Chris Haddock & Esta Spalding	4 October 2000
28	2	"Bring Back the Dead"	Tom Braidwood	Frank Borg, Alan DiFiore, Chris Haddock & Esta Spalding	11 October 2000
29	3	"It's a Bad Corner"	Anne Wheeler	Frank Borg, Alan DiFiore, Chris Haddock & Esta Spalding	18 October 2000
30	4	"Do You Wanna Dance?"	A.J. Vesak	Frank Borg, Alan DiFiore, Chris Haddock & Esta Spalding	25 October 2000
31	5	"The Hottest Places in Hell"	Alan Simmonds	Frank Borg, Alan DiFiore, Chris Haddock & Esta Spalding	8 November 2000
32	6	"This Shit Is Evil"	David Frazee	Frank Borg, Alan DiFiore, Chris Haddock & Esta Spalding	15 November 2000
33	7	"An Act of God"	Scott Summersgill	Frank Borg, Alan DiFiore, Chris Haddock & Esta Spalding	22 November 2000
34	8	"All Tricked Up"	Lee Knippelberg	Frank Borg, Alan DiFiore, Chris Haddock & Esta Spalding	29 November 2000
35	9	"Better Broke than Naked"	Ian Tracey	Frank Borg, Alan DiFiore, Chris Haddock & Esta Spalding	9 January 2001
36	10	"You See How It Begins?"	Donnelly Rhodes	Frank Borg, Alan DiFiore, Chris Haddock & Esta Spalding	16 January 2001
37	11	"It's Backwards Day"	Chris Haddock	Frank Borg, Alan DiFiore, Chris Haddock & Esta Spalding	23 January 2001
38	12	"The Sparkle Tour"	Alan Simmonds	Chris Haddock & Larry Campbell	30 January 2001
39	13	"I'm an Anomaly and an Anachronism, But I'm Not Alone"	Brad Turner	Chris Haddock & Larry Campbell	6 February 2001

=== Season 4 (2001–2002) ===
No. overall	No. in season	Title	Directed by	Written by	Original release date
40	1	"Too Late for Mr. Early"	Stephen Surjik	Frank Borg, Alan DiFiore & Chris Haddock	30 September 2001
41	2	"Oppenheimer Park"	Alan Simmonds	Frank Borg, Alan DiFiore & Chris Haddock	14 October 2001
42	3	"Banging on the Wall"	Chris Haddock	Larry Campbell & Chris Haddock	21 October 2001
43	4	"Cheap Aftershave"	Alan Simmonds	Frank Borg, Alan DiFiore & Chris Haddock	28 October 2001
44	5	"Ugly Quick"	John Fawcett	Frank Borg, Alan DiFiore & Chris Haddock	4 November 2001
45	6	"Birds Have Been at Her"	Mairzee Almas	Frank Borg, Alan DiFiore & Chris Haddock	11 November 2001
46	7	"Shoulda Been a Priest"	John Fawcett	Frank Borg, Alan DiFiore & Chris Haddock	18 November 2001
47	8	"Sixes and Sevens"	David Frazee	Frank Borg, Alan DiFiore & Chris Haddock	2 December 2001
48	9	"Be a Cruel Twist"	John Fawcett	Frank Borg, Alan DiFiore & Chris Haddock	6 January 2002
49	10	"Simple, Sad"	Brad Turner	Frank Borg, Alan DiFiore & Chris Haddock	13 January 2002
50	11	"Pretend You Didn't See Me"	Chris Haddock	Alan DiFiore & Chris Haddock	20 January 2002
51	12	"Gather Up All the Little People"	Brad Turner	Larry Campbell & Stephen E. Miller	21 January 2002
52	13	"In the Bear Pit"	Nicholas Campbell	Alan DiFiore & Chris Haddock	21 January 2002

=== Season 5 (2002–2003) ===
No. overall	No. in season	Title	Directed by	Written by	Original release date
53	1	"A Big Whiff of a Real Bad Smell"	David Frazee	Frank Borg, Alan DiFiore & Chris Haddock	27 October 2002
54	2	"Ass Covering Day"	George Mihalka	Frank Borg, Alan DiFiore & Chris Haddock	2 November 2002
55	3	"A Big Enough Fan"	Robert Cuffley	Frank Borg, Alan DiFiore & Chris Haddock	10 November 2002
56	4	"Run by the Monkeys"	Keith Behrman	Frank Borg, Alan DiFiore & Chris Haddock	17 November 2002
57	5	"At First It Was Funny"	George Mihalka	Frank Borg, Alan DiFiore & Chris Haddock	1 December 2002
58	6	"Dizzy Looking Down"	Lynne Stopkewich	Frank Borg, Alan DiFiore & Chris Haddock	8 December 2002
59	7	"God Forbid We Call It What It Is"	William Fruet	Frank Borg, Alan DiFiore & Chris Haddock	12 January 2003
60	8	"Doing the Chicken Scratch"	Stephen Surjik	Frank Borg, Alan DiFiore & Chris Haddock	19 January 2003
61	9	"For Just Bein' Indian"	Nicholas Campbell	Larry Campbell & Lorimer Shenher	26 January 2003
62	10	"Dogs Don't Bite People"	Lee Knippelberg	Frank Borg, Alan DiFiore & Chris Haddock	2 February 2003
63	11	"The Ducks Are Too Depressing"	David Frazee	Alan DiFiore & Chris Haddock	9 February 2003
64	12	"You Got Monkey Chatter"	Stephen Surjik	Alan DiFiore & Chris Haddock	23 February 2003
65	13	"Everybody Needs a Working Girl"	John Fawcett	Alan DiFiore & Chris Haddock	23 February 2003

=== Season 6 (2003–2004) ===
No. overall	No. in season	Title	Directed by	Written by	Original release date
66	1	"Thanks for the Toaster Oven"	George Mihalka	Alan DiFiore & Chris Haddock	23 November 2003
67	2	"Send in the Clowns"	Anne Wheeler	Alan DiFiore & Chris Haddock	23 November 2003
68	3	"Bury My Own Bones"	Sturla Gunnarsson	Alan DiFiore & Chris Haddock	30 November 2003
69	4	"Iffy Areas Around the Edges"	Stephen Surjik	Alan DiFiore & Chris Haddock	7 December 2003
70	5	"Twenty-Five-Dollar Conversation"	Richard Martin	Alan DiFiore & Chris Haddock	14 December 2003
71	6	"Can Bend, But I Won’t Break"	John Fawcett	Alan DiFiore & Chris Haddock	18 January 2004
72	7	"Out of the Bag and All Over the Street"	Steve DiMarco	Pete White	25 January 2004
73	8	"The Squirrels Are of English Descent"	David Frazee	Jesse McKeown	1 February 2004
74	9	"Jungle's Dark But Full of Diamonds"	Charles Martin Smith	Jesse McKeown	8 February 2004
75	10	"There's a Story Goes Along with This"	George Mihalka	Pete White	22 February 2004
76	11	"Okay It's Official"	Morris Panych	Rick Crook, Syliva Leung, Jesse McKeown & Pete White	21 March 2004
77	12	"A Man When He's Down"	George Mihalka	Alan DiFiore & Chris Haddock	4 April 2004
78	13	"Seven Tentacles"	Nicholas Campbell	Alan DiFiore & Chris Haddock	4 April 2004

=== Season 7 (2004–2005) ===
No. overall	No. in season	Title	Directed by	Written by	Original release date
79	1	"Not So Pretty Now"	Stephen Surjik	Alan DiFiore & Chris Haddock	12 October 2004
80	2	"Wash the Blood Out of the Ring"	George Mihalka	Alan DiFiore & Chris Haddock	19 October 2004
81	3	"That Sounds Like What We Call a Mutiny"	David Frazee	Alan DiFiore & Chris Haddock	26 October 2004
82	4	"Mr. Ellis Himself Woulda Been Proud"	Stuart Margolin	Alan DiFiore & Chris Haddock	2 November 2004
83	5	"That’s Why They Call It a Conspiracy"	Mina Shum	Alan DiFiore & Chris Haddock	9 November 2004
84	6	"You Promised Me a Celebrity"	Ian Tracey	Alan DiFiore & Chris Haddock	16 November 2004
85	7	"First the Seducing Then the Screwing"	Sean Ryerson	Alan DiFiore & Chris Haddock	23 November 2004
86	8	"The Ol' Coco Bop"	Stefan Pleszczynski	Chris Haddock & Jesse McKeown	30 November 2004
87	9	"Better Go Herd Your Ducks"	Lee Knippelberg	Chris Haddock & Jesse McKeown	7 December 2004
88	10	"Ride a Crippled Horse"	David Frazee	Chris Haddock & Sylvia Leung	11 January 2005
89	11	"A Delicate Bloodbath"	Chris Haddock	Chris Haddock & Jesse McKeown	18 January 2005
90	12	"Before They Twist the Knife"	Stephen Surjik	Chris Haddock & Jesse McKeown	23 January 2005
91	13	"Must Be a Night for Fires"	Nicholas Campbell	Chris Haddock, Sylvia Leung & Jesse McKeown	23 January 2005
