= John Pyper-Ferguson =

Australian-born Canadian actor (born 1964)

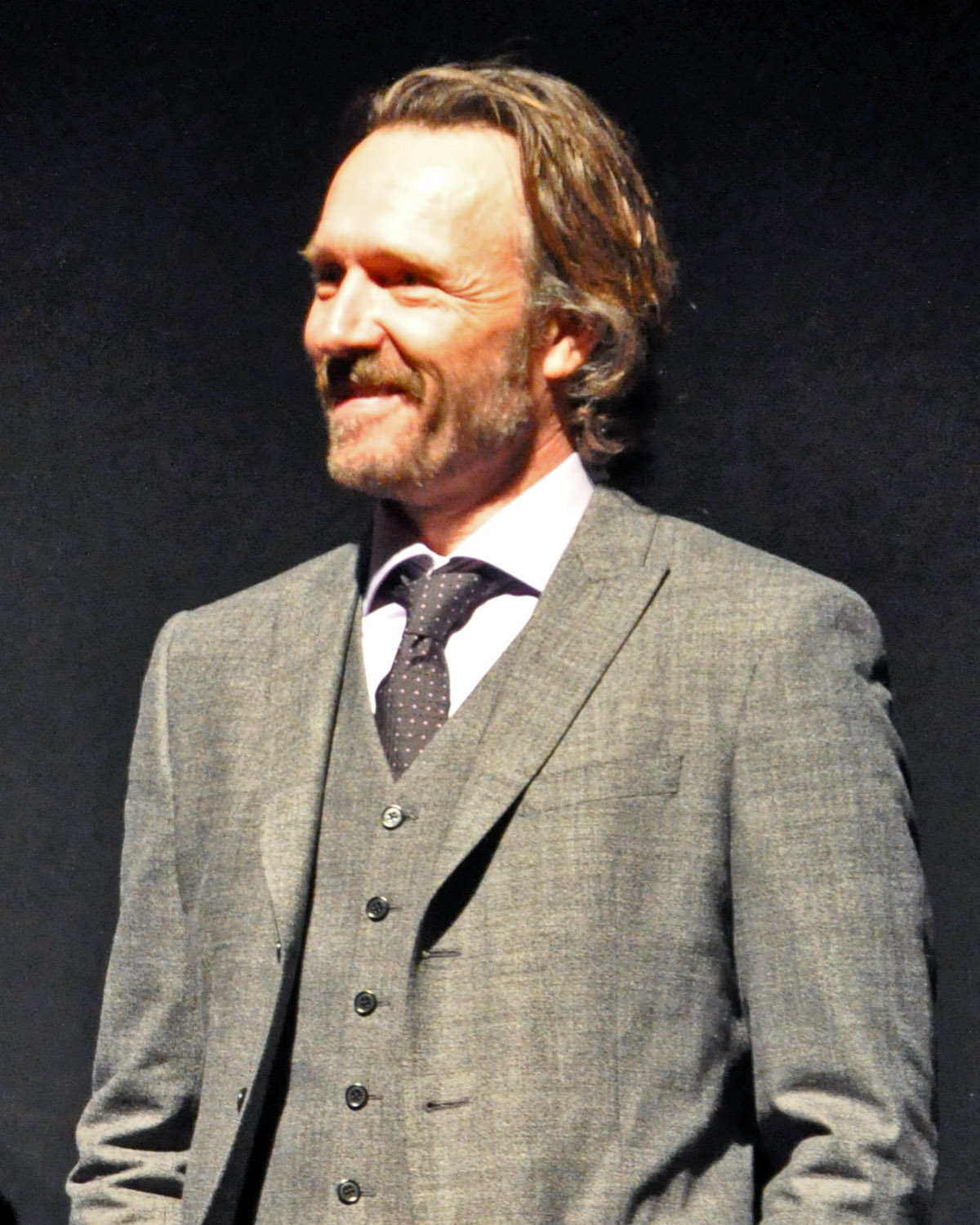
- Pyper-Ferguson at the 2010 Toronto International Film Festival
- Born: February 27, 1964 (age 62); Mordialloc, Victoria, Australia
- Education: University of Alberta (BFA)
- Occupation: Actor
- Years active: 1979–present
- Parents: Rich Ferguson (father); Kay McNamee (mother)

John Pyper-Ferguson (born February 27, 1964) is a Canadian actor. He has appeared in a wide range of films and television shows. His notable works include playing Sonny Hamilton on Hamilton's Quest, Peter Hutter on The Adventures of Brisco County, Jr., and Joe Whedon on Brothers & Sisters. He also portrayed Tomas Vergis on the science fiction drama television series Caprica, Tex on the TNT television series The Last Ship, James Kendrick on Burn Notice and Jack Soloff on USA Network's television series Suits.

== Early life and education ==
John Pyper-Ferguson was born in Mordialloc, Victoria, Australia, the son of 1948 and 1952 Canadian Olympic swimmer Kathleen McNamee and Canadian "Miracle Mile" runner Richard Ferguson. After a brief period in his birth place, he moved to Vancouver, British Columbia, Canada, where he was raised by his parents. He went to high school at Handsworth Secondary School, and later graduated with distinction from the University of Alberta with a Bachelor of Fine Arts in Performance.

== Career ==
=== 1986–1999 ===
Pyper-Ferguson began his acting career on the prime time drama Hamilton's Quest (1986) as Sonny Hamilton. This brought about Hollywood film roles in movies such as Prom Night II (1987), Pin (1988), Ski School (1990), Bird on a Wire (1990), Stay Tuned (1992), a brief appearance in Unforgiven (1992), and Killer Image (1992).

He concurrently continued his television career with several guest appearances, including shows like Night Heat (1987), 21 Jump Street (1990) as Joshua, Bordertown (1990–1991) as August Fox and Lonny Gibbons, Neon Rider (1990–1991) as Zak and Det. Miller, MacGyver (1991), Star Trek: The Next Generation (1992), and Walker, Texas Ranger (1993).

From 1993 to 1994, John played a recurring character on The Adventures of Brisco County, Jr. as Pete Hutter. A significant moment in his career was his portrayal of Brian Cullen on Highlander: The Series (1994), for which he earned a Gemini Award-nomination, Best Performance by an Actor in a Guest Role Dramatic Series.

Subsequent television guest roles consist of his appearances on Children of the Dust (1995), Legend (1995), Lonesome Dove: The Outlaw Years (1995), recurrences on The X-Files (1995–1997) as Paul and Det. John Kresge, Nash Bridges (1996–1998) as Zack Spears, and The Outer Limits (1996) as Brian Chason (Episode: "Falling Star"). His other credits include The Sentinel (1997), Millennium (1997–1998) as Jim Gilroy, Jake Waterston and Ben Fisher, Poltergeist: The Legacy (1997–1998), The Crow: Stairway to Heaven (1998–1999), Harsh Realm (1999), and finally Jack & Jill (1999) as Kevin (Episode: "Pseudos, Sex and Sidebars").

Filling out the rest of the decade, he appears in several feature films like Frank & Jesse (1995) as Clell Miller, Hard Core Logo (1996), For Richer or Poorer (1997), Drive (1998), and I'll Take You There (1999).

=== 2000–present ===
He started appearing on the television series Arli$$ (2000), ER (2000), CSI: Crime Scene Investigation (2000–2010) as Husband and Dr. William Byrne, a recurring role on The Huntress (2000–2001) as Jake Blumenthal, The Outer Limits (2001) as Dr. Kenneth Vaughn (Episode: "Mind Reacher"), Jack & Jill (2000–2001) as Kevin (Episodes: "When You Wish Upon a Car", "Starstruck", and "California Dreamin'"), The Guardian (2001), 24 (2003), a recurring role as Gabriel Sims on Jeremiah (2003–2004), Smallville (2005), CSI: Miami (2005), Into the West (2005) as Josiah Bell, The Closer (2005), and Night Stalker (2005–2006) as Agent Bernard Fain.

In 2006, John Pyper-Ferguson joined the main cast of Brothers & Sisters as a series regular, playing the character Joe Whedon.

From 2007 to 2011, his television credits are Everest (2007) as Roger Marshall, Cane (2007) as Hudson, The L Word (2008), Cold Case (2008) as Pete Doyle, Fear Itself (2008) as Rowdy Edlund, Terminator: The Sarah Connor Chronicles (2009), Bones (2009), Mental (2009), Lie to Me (2009), Flashpoint (2009), Criminal Minds (2010), Lost (2010), White Collar (2010), Dark Blue (2010), Castle (2010), Hellcats (2011), Alphas (2011), and a performance on the science fiction series Fringe (2011), as two alternate versions of the character named John McClennan.

His film career moved on to notable movies like Pearl Harbor (2001), Black Dawn (2005), She's the Man (2006), X-Men: The Last Stand (2006), Tekken (2009), Score: A Hockey Musical (2010), A Night for Dying Tigers (2010), Conviction (2010), Born to Race (2011), and Drive (2011).

From 2005 to 2013, Pyper-Ferguson was cast in an abundance of TV shows set in the reimagined BSG universe. On the space opera thriller series Battlestar Galactica (2005–2006) he played Captain Cole "Stinger" Taylor. On its science fiction drama prequel Caprica (2010), he portrayed Tomas Vergis, the Tauron billionaire and adversary of Daniel Graystone, with whom he—on multiple occasions—goes head-to-head. He played Xander Toth in the military science fiction television pilot entitled Battlestar Galactica: Blood & Chrome.

In 2014, Pyper-Ferguson began appearing as Tex, a special forces soldier, during the first season of the TNT drama The Last Ship; in the second season, he was upped to the regular cast on the show. However, his character was killed off at the end of season three though he reprised the role briefly in the series finale. In 2015, he appeared as Jack Soloff, a recurring character on the USA Network drama Suits.

In 2017, he appeared as a guest in season four of The 100 as Bill Cadogan, the leader of the Second Dawn doomsday cult. In season seven, he reprised the role as a recurring character.

He is playing a character named Jack Jones in the upcoming film, Three Days in Havana.

== Filmography ==
=== Film ===
Year	Title	Role	Notes
1987	Prom Night II	Eddie Wood	
1988	Pin	Stan Fraker	
1989	Bye Bye Blues	Duncan	
1990	Ski School	Erich Blor	
1990	Bird on a Wire	Jamie	
1991	The Legend of Kootenai Brown	Vowell	
1992	Killer Image	Max Oliver	
1992	Unforgiven	Deputy Charley Hecker	
1992	Stay Tuned	30 Something to Life	
1993	Love, Cheat & Steal	Collins	
1994	Every Breath	Hal	
1994	The Road Killers	Hauser	
1995	Frank & Jesse	Clell Miller	
1996	Hard Core Logo	John Oxenberger	
1996	Somebody Is Waiting	Davis	
1997	At the Hands of Another	Tab Michales	Short film
1997	Space Marines	Colonel Fraser	
1997	McHale's Navy	Interrupting Henchman	
1997	Drive	Vic Madison	
1997	For Richer or Poorer	Henner Lapp	
1999	I'll Take You There	Ray	
2001	Lonesome	Tom Lawless	
2001	Pearl Harbor	Naval Officer In Hospital	
2003	The Wind Effect	Jake Porter	Short film
2003	Betraying Reason	Reason Boles / Bart "Black Bart"	
2005	Vancouver	Constable #1	Short film
2005	Fishbowl	Homeless Guy	Short film
2005	Black Dawn	James Donovan	Direct-to-video
2006	She's the Man	Roger	
2006	X-Men: The Last Stand	Minivan Father	
2009	Hungry Hills	Kane	
2009	Tekken	Bonner	
2010	Die	Jacob Odessa	
2010	Score: A Hockey Musical	Coach Donker	
2010	A Night for Dying Tigers	Russell	
2010	Conviction	Aidan	
2011	Born to Race	Frank Krueger	
2011	Drive	Bearded Redneck	
2014	Wolves	Joe "Wild Joe"	
2014	The Remaining	Pastor Shay	
2026	Casa Grande	Sawyer Clarkman	

=== Television ===
Year	Title	Role	Notes
1979	The Littlest Hobo	Unknown	Episode: "Little Girl Lost"
1986	Hamilton's Quest	Sonny Hamilton	Series regular
1987	American Harvest	Ricky	TV movie
1987	Night Heat	John Edwards	Episode: "The Cost of Doing Business"
1988	Rin Tin Tin: K-9 Cop	Unknown	Episode: "Boy Meets Dog"
1990	21 Jump Street	Dealer / Joshua	Episodes: "Awomp-Bomp-Aloobomb, Aloop Bamboom", "Brothers"
1990–1991	Bordertown	August Fox / Lonny Gibbons	Episodes: "Hand to Hand", "The Road Chosen"
1990–1991	Neon Rider	Zak / Detective Miller	Episodes: "John Doe", "Twist in the Wind"
1991	Mom P.I.	Unknown	Episode: "Repo Ride"
1991	MacGyver	Scott Bartlett	Episode: "The Wasteland"
1992	Home Movie	Bernard	TV movie
1992	The Commish	Cory McBride	Episode: "Judgement Day"
1992	Lightning Force	Malcolm	Episode: "Ice"
1992	Star Trek: The Next Generation	Eli Hollander	Episode: "A Fistful of Datas"
1992	Shadow of a Stranger	Robert Logan	TV movie
1993	Miracle on Interstate 880	Greg Helm	TV movie
1993	Bodies of Evidence	Bruce Johnson	Episode: "Blindside"
1993	Walker, Texas Ranger	Critter	Episode: "An Innocent Man"
1993–1994	The Adventures of Brisco County, Jr.	Peter Hutter	Recurring role, 7 episodes
1994-1998	Viper	Ray Bollo / Agent Harper	Episodes: "Past Tense", "The Return"
1994	Highlander	Brian Cullen	Episode: "Courage"
1995	The Watcher	Unknown	Episode: "Heartburned"
1995	University Hospital	Cal Chaney	Episode: "The Right Thing"
1995	Children of the Dust	Sonny Boy	TV miniseries
1995	Vanishing Son	Unknown	Episode: "Jersey Girl"
1995	Legend	Jack McCall	Episode: "The Life, Death, and Life of Wild Bill Hickok"
1995	Lonesome Dove: The Outlaw Years	Earl Hastings	Episode: "Fear"
1995	The Client	Hawkins	Episode: "Dear Harris"
1995–1997	The X-Files	Paul / Detective John Kresge	Episodes: "F. Emasculata" "Christmas Carol" "Emily"
1996	Downdraft	"Spike"	TV movie
1996–1998	Nash Bridges	Zack Spears	Episodes: "Wrecking Crew", "Skin Deep"
1996-2001	The Outer Limits	Brian Chason / Dr. Kenneth Vaughn	Episodes: "Falling Star", "Mind Reacher"
1997	The Sentinel	Dawson Quinn	Episode: "Survival"
1997–1998	Millennium	Jim Gilroy / Jake Waterston / Ben Fisher	Episodes: "The Wild and the Innocent", "Anamnesis"
1997–1998	Poltergeist: The Legacy	Baron De Rais / Nicholas Oldman	Episodes: "Let Sleeping Demons Lie", "Seduction"
1998	The Warlord: Battle for the Galaxy	Heenoc Xian	TV movie
1998	The Tempest	Gator Man	TV movie
1998–1999	The Crow: Stairway to Heaven	Jason "Top Dollar" Danko	Episodes: "Give Me Death", "Closing Time"
1999	Harsh Realm	John Cabot	Episode: "Leviathan"
1999–2001	Jack & Jill	Kevin	Episodes: "Pseudos, Sex and Sidebars" "When You Wish Upon a Car" "Starstruck" "California Dreamin'"
2000	Arli$$	Aaron	Episode: "It's Who You Know"
2000	ER	Tom Coggins	Episode: "Flight of Fancy"
2000-2010	CSI: Crime Scene Investigation	Husband / Dr. William Byrne	Episodes: "Pilot", "Irradiator"
2000–2001	The Huntress	Jake Blumenthal	Episodes: "Scattered" "Run Ricky Run" "Now You See Him"
2001	The Waiting Game	Carl	TV movie
2001	Gideon's Crossing	Tim Palmer	Episode: "Clinical Enigma"
2001	The Guardian	Jerry	Episode: "Paternity"
2001	Judging Amy	Paul Granson	Episode: "Imbroglio"
2002	Family Law	James Shaw	Episode: "Celano v. Foster"
2002	Mentors	Butch Cassidy	Episode: "Dusty Trails"
2002	Cabin Pressure	Gabriel Wingfield	TV movie
2003	Tom Stone	Maurice Washington	Episode: "Pants on Fire"
2003	24	Inmate #1	Episode: "Day 3: 5:00 p.m.-6:00 p.m."
2003–2004	Jeremiah	Gabriel Sims	Recurring role, 6 episodes
2004	The Handler	Carl	Episode: "Bleak House"
2004	The Division	Bob Pringle	Episode: "The Kids Are Alright"
2004	Angel in the Family	Alex	TV movie
2005	Smallville	Dr. William McBride	Episode: "Unsafe"
2005	CSI: Miami	Eddie Michaelson	Episode: "One Night Stand"
2005	Into the West	Josiah Bell	TV miniseries
2005	The Closer	Attorney Andy Osterman	Episode: "The Big Picture"
2005	Killer Instinct	Detective Sean Landry	Episode: "Five Easy Pieces"
2005–2006	Battlestar Galactica	Captain Cole "Stinger" Taylor	Episodes: "Pegasus", "Resurrection Ship: Part 1"
2005–2006	Night Stalker	Agent Bernard Fain	Episodes: "Pilot" "The Source" "The Sea"
2006	For the Love of a Child	Richard	TV movie
2006	In Justice	Michael Solletti	Episode: "Badge of Honor"
2006–2007	Brothers & Sisters	Joe Whedon	Series regular
2007	Everest	Roger Marshall	Episodes: "Episode #1.1" "Episode #1.2" "Episode #1.3" "Episode #1.4"
2007	Cane	Hudson	Episodes: "The Exile" "Time Away" "HurriCane"
2008	The L Word	Michael Angelo	Episode: "Lady of the Lake"
2008	Cold Case	Pete Doyle	Episode: "Bad Reputation"
2008	Fear Itself	Rowdy Edlund	Episode: "Skin and Bones"
2009	Terminator: The Sarah Connor Chronicles	George McCarthy	Episode: "Desert Cantos"
2009	Bones	Landis Collar	Episode: "The Science in the Physicist"
2009	Mental	Andy Foito	Episode: "Roles of Engagement"
2009	Lie to Me	Jamie Cowley	Episode: "Truth or Consequences"
2009	Flashpoint	Charles Stewart	Episode: "The Farm"
2010	Criminal Minds	Wilson Summers	Episode: "Risky Business"
2010	Lost	Oceanic Delivery Man	Episode: "The End"
2010	Rookie Blue	Dean	Episode: "Signals Crossed"
2010	White Collar	Edgar Halbridge / Steve Price	Episode: "Unfinished Business"
2010	Dark Blue	Kyle Erikson	Episode: "Brother's Keeper"
2010	Caprica	Tomas Vergis	6 episodes
2010	Castle	Dean Donegal	Episode: "Murder Most Fowl"
2011	Hellcats	Rex Perkins	Episode: "I'm Sick Y'all"
2011	Fringe	John McClennan	Episode: "One Night in October"
2011–2012	Alphas	Stanton Parish	Recurring role, 10 episodes
2012	Hannah's Law	McMurphy	TV movie
2012	Less Than Kind	Jack	Episode: "Play It Again, Sam"
2012	Grimm	Hayden Walker	Episode: "Bad Moon Rising"
2012	Longmire	Leland	Episode: "An Incredibly Beautiful Thing"
2012	Battlestar Galactica: Blood & Chrome	Xander Toth	TV movie
2013	Once Upon a Time	Kurt Flynn	Episode: "Welcome to Storybrooke"
2013	Deception	Wyatt Scott	Episodes: "Tell Me" "Stay With Me" "Good Luck With Your Death" "You're the Bad Guy" "I'll Start with the Hillbilly"
2013	Motive	Charles Stanwyck	Episode: "Undertow"
2013	Burn Notice	James Kendrick	6 episodes
2014–2018	The Last Ship	'Tex' Nolan	Recurring role (season 1); main role (season 2); Recurring role (season 3); Guest star (season 5)
2015-2018	Suits	Jack Soloff	Recurring role (season 5); Guest role (Season 6 & 7)
2016	American Horror Story: Roanoke	Billy Ford (portraying Anthony Cage)	Episode: "Chapter 3"
2017	Agents of S.H.I.E.L.D.	Tucker Shockley	3 episodes (season 4)
2017; 2020	The 100	Bill Cadogan	Guest role (season 4); Recurring role (season 7)
2017	Queen of the South	Finnerman	4 episodes (season 2)
2018	The Detectives	Detective Mike Eastham	Episode: The Wells Gray Gunman
2019	The Blacklist	Hutton	Episode: Kuwait

== Awards and nominations ==
Year	Award	Award category	Title of work	Result
1997	Gemini Award	Best Performance by an Actor in a Guest Role Dramatic Series	"Courage" on Highlander	Nominated
