= Man with a Gun =

Man with a Gun may refer to:

- Man with a Gun (1958 film), a British crime film
- Man with a Gun (1995 film), a Canadian crime-thriller film
- "Man with a Gun", a song from the album Casual Gods

== See also ==
- The Man with the Gun, a 1938 Soviet history drama film
- Man with the Gun, a 1955 black and white Western film
