= Crystal Lowe =

Canadian actress (born 1981)

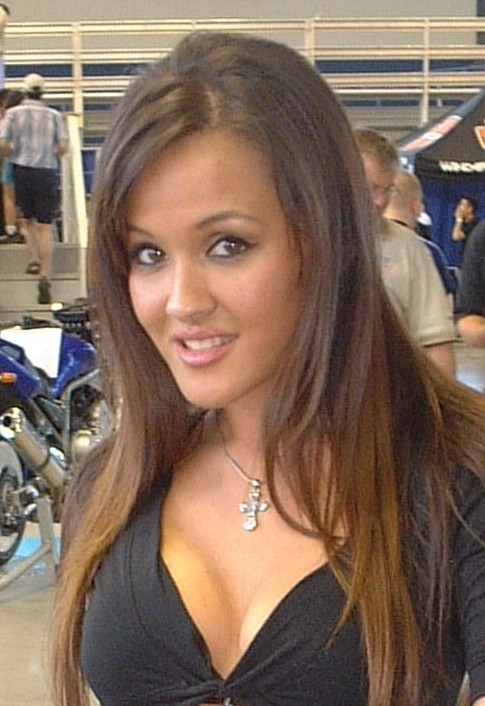
- Lowe in 2005
- Born: Yan-Kay Lo; January 20, 1981 (age 45); Vancouver, British Columbia, Canada
- Occupation: Actress
- Years active: 1996–present
- Spouse: Miko Tomasevich (m. 2009)
- Children: 2

Yan-Kay Crystal Lowe (born Yan-Kay Lo; January 20, 1981) is a Canadian actress and director. She is known for her scream queen roles in horror films such as Children of the Corn: Revelation (2001), Final Destination 3 (2006), Black Christmas (2006), and Wrong Turn 2: Dead End (2007). She played Rita Haywith in Hallmark Channel's television and television film series Signed, Sealed, Delivered (2013–present).

== Early life and family ==
Lowe was born Yan-Kay Lo in Vancouver, British Columbia to a Chinese father from Hong Kong and a Scottish mother. When she was young the family moved to Hong Kong, where they lived for several years. In an interview in 2016, Lowe said that she had wanted to be an actress since the age of five.

== Career ==
Lowe started her career as a model. Her first acting role was at age 15 as Nya on an episode of Stargate SG-1. Lowe went on to guest star in several popular television shows like Masters of Horror, Psych, Supernatural, Stargate: Atlantis, The L Word, plus many more.

Lowe's first film role came in 2000 when she was cast in the film Get Carter. Soon after she was cast as Tiffany in the horror film Children of the Corn: Revelation. In 2006, Lowe was cast as Ashlyn Halperin in Final Destination 3. Her next role was as Lauren in the remake of Black Christmas. Lowe later went on to star as Elena in Wrong Turn 2: Dead End.

Lowe went on to do cameo roles in the films Fantastic Four: Rise of the Silver Surfer and Good Luck Chuck. In 2008 she was reunited with her Final Destination 3 co-stars Sam Easton and Amanda Crew in the film That One Night. Also in 2008, Lowe was cast in supporting roles for the films Yeti: Curse of the Snow Demon, Poison Ivy: The Secret Society and Center Stage: Turn It Up.

In 2010, Lowe appeared as Zoe in the film Hot Tub Time Machine, as Vala in the ninth season of the CW show Smallville and as Nina in Sheldon Wilson's horror/thriller film Killer Mountain. In mid-2011, Lowe was cast as Tina in A Little Bit Zombie and as Piper/Peaches in the TV movie To the Mat. In early 2012, she was cast as Toby Nance, one of the lead characters in the new series Primeval: New World.

In 2014, Lowe was cast as Rita Haywith in the Hallmark series Signed, Sealed, Delivered, which aired for one season in 2014 before becoming successive television films. In 2015, she took a role behind the camera, directing the locally produced short film Becoming Sophie which was featured at Cannes Short Film Library and L.A. Women's Film Festival.

In 2017, Lowe played Sarah Albans, the mother of Julian, the main antagonist in the film version of Wonder, based on the 2012 novel.

== Personal life ==
On August 8, 2009, Lowe married Miko Tomasevich at Vancouver's historic Hycroft Manor. She and her husband own Hyde Restaurant in Vancouver, British Columbia.

Lowe is fluent in Cantonese.

In February 2025, Lowe was diagnosed with stage-3 breast cancer and underwent chemotherapy and had a double mastectomy.

== Filmography ==
=== Film ===
Year	Title	Role	Notes
2000	Get Carter	Nikki	
2000	Sanctimony	Virginia	
2001	Children of the Corn: Revelation	Tiffany	
2002	Insomnia	Kay Connell	
2002	I Spy	Beautiful Girl	
2004	Going the Distance	Waitress	
2005	Thralls	Tanya Watner	
2006	Final Destination 3	Ashlyn Halperin	
2006	Scary Movie 4	Chingy's Girl	
2006	Snakes on a Plane	Autograph Girl	
2006	Black Christmas	Lauren Hannon	
2007	Fantastic Four: Rise of the Silver Surfer	Hot Party Girl	
2007	Wrong Turn 2: Dead End	Elena Garcia	
2007	Good Luck Chuck	Cam's Wedding Friend	
2008	That One Night	Stacy	
2008	Center Stage: Turn It Up	Lexi	
2008	Dim Sum Funeral	Jane	
2009	Driven to Kill	Tanya	
2010	Hot Tub Time Machine	Zoe	
2012	A Little Bit Zombie	Tina	
2013	Charlie	Rose	
2014	Becoming Sophie	N/A	Director, producer
2016	Rampage: President Down	Crystal	
2017	Wonder	Sarah Albans	
2019	Benchwarmers 2: Breaking Balls	Ramona	
2023	Break In	Ellen	

=== Television ===
Year	Title	Role	Notes
1997	Stargate SG-1	Nya	Episode: "Emancipation"
1997	Breaker High	Melina	Episode: "Beware of Geeks Baring Their Gifts"
1998	Cold Squad	Samantha Gordon	Episode: "Merv Doucette"
1998	Da Vinci's Inquest	Shelley Dunne	Episode: "The Most Dangerous Time"
1998	The Adventures of Shirley Holmes	Pascal	Episode: "The Case of the Open Hand"
1999–2000	Cold Squad	Myra Larson	Episodes: "Deadly Games: Part 2", "Death by Intent: Part 1"
2001	Da Vinci's Inquest	Sylvia	Episodes: "Banging on the Wall", "Cheap Aftershave"
2002	MTV's Now What?	Shannon	Episodes: "Zack's Little Problem", "Reality Bites", "Purity Test"
2002	The Secret Life of Zoey	Cheerleader	Television film
2002	The Twilight Zone	Groupie	Episode: "Harsh Mistress"
2004	Life as We Know It	Julie	Episode: "Natural Disasters"
2005	The Life	Student #3	Television film
2005	The Collector	Cree	Episode: "The Tattoo Artist"
2005	The L Word	Cocktail Waitress	Episode: "Lap Dance"
2006	Masters of Horror	Lily	Episode: "Pick Me Up"
2006	Killer Instinct	Yvette	Episode: "She's the Bomb"
2006	The Evidence	Deb Kintza	Episode: "And the Envelope Please"
2006	Totally Awesome	Pretty Girl	Television film
2007	Falcon Beach	Kelly	Episode: "Strawberry Social Reject"
2007	Psych	Eden	Episode: "Scary Sherry: Bianca's Toast"
2007	Psych	Daphne	Episode: "If You're So Smart, Then Why Are You Dead?"
2007	Bionic Woman	Jessica	Episode: "Second Chances"
2008	Stargate Atlantis	Mardola	Episode: "Harmony"
2008	Poison Ivy: The Secret Society	Isabel Turner	Television film
2008	Yeti: Curse of the Snow Demon	Ashley	Television film
2008	The Boy Next Door	Nicole Warner	Television film
2009	Supernatural	Leticia Gore Actress	Episode: "The Real Ghostbusters"
2009	What Color Is Love?	Faiza	Television film
2009	Trust	Michelle	Television film
2010	Smallville	Vala	Recurring role (season 9)
2011	Shattered	Woman	Episode: "Finding the Boy"
2011	Taken from Me: The Tiffany Rubin Story	Natalie	Television film
2011	To the Mat	Piper / Peaches	Television film
2011	Killer Mountain	Dr. Nina Preston	Television film
2012	R.L. Stine's The Haunting Hour	Cassandra	Episode: "Headshot"
2012–2013	Primeval: New World	Toby Nance	Main role
2013–2014	Signed, Sealed, Delivered	Rita Haywith	Main role
2014	Almost Human	Jeannie	Episode: "Simon Says"
2014	Republic of Doyle	Michelle Cantwell	Episode: "No Rest for the Convicted"
2014–2018; 2021; 2024; 2025	Signed, Sealed, Delivered	Rita Haywith	Television film series
2015	Gourmet Detective: A Healthy Place to Die	Gretchen / Linda French	Television film
2016	Hearts of Christmas	Lauren Wright	Television film
2017	Christmas at Holly Lodge	Callie	Television film
2017	Marry Me At Christmas	Isabel	Television film
2019	Flip That Romance	Kat	Television film
2019	Christmas at Dollywood	Maggie Davis	Television film
2020	The Wrong Wedding Planner	Ashley	Television film; credited as Yan-Kay Crystal Lowe
2022	Old Flames Never Die	Kira	Television film; credited as Yan-Kay Crystal Lowe
2024	Wild Cards	Siobhan	Episode: "Howl to Get Away With Murder"; credited as Yan-Kay Crystal Lowe
2024	Shifting Gears	N/A	Television film; Director credited as Yan-Kay Crystal Lowe
2024	This Time Each Year	N/A	Television film; Director credited as Yan-Kay Crystal Lowe
2025	The Wish Swap	Jess	Television film; credited as Yan-Kay Crystal Lowe
2025	A Pie To Die For: A Hannah Swensen Mystery	N/A	Television film; Director credited as Yan-Kay Crystal Lowe
2026	Nelly Knows Mysteries: All Manners of Murder	Leah	Television film; credited as Yan-Kay Crystal Lowe
2026	All's Fair in Love and Mahjong	Shelley	Television film; credited as Yan-Kay Crystal Lowe

== Awards and nominations ==
Year	Event	Award/category	Work	Result	Ref.
2006	Fangoria Chainsaw Awards	Line That Killed (Best One-Liner) (Note: For the line: "Look, girls with asses like mine, don't talk to guys with faces like yours.")	Final Destination 3	Nominated	
2012	Canada International Film Festival	Rising Star Award (shared with Shawn Roberts and Kristopher Turner, among others)	A Little Bit Zombie	Won	
2014	UBCP/ACTRA Awards	Best Actress	Signed, Sealed, Delivered	Nominated	
2016	UBCP/ACTRA Awards	Best Actress	Signed, Sealed, Delivered: From Paris with Love	Nominated	
2017	The IndieFest Film Awards	Award of Excellence for Best Short Film	The Curtain	Won	
2017	LA Shorts Awards	Platinum Award for Best Short Film	The Curtain	Won	
2017	Los Angeles Independent Film Festival Awards	LAIFF August Award for Best Drama Short	The Curtain	Nominated	
2017	NYC Indie Film Awards	NYC Indie Film Award for Best Short Film	The Curtain	Won	
