= Thomas Y. Drake =

Canadian singer-songwriter (1936–2008)

- Born: June 28, 1936; Vancouver, British Columbia, Canada
- Died: August 8, 2008 (aged 72); Vancouver, British Columbia, Canada
- Occupations: Singer-songwriter, film director, screenwriter
- Spouse(s): Sally Gray Drake (m. 1958–2008, his death)
- Children: 3 (Steven, Adam, Jono)

Thomas Y. Drake (June 28, 1936 – August 8, 2008), also credited professionally as T. Y. Drake and Tom Drake, was a Canadian singer-songwriter, film director and screenwriter.

== Life and career ==
Drake began his career at nine years old when he became involved as a child actor in radio plays for the CBC in Vancouver. At the age of 12, he and his family moved to the United States where he began singing professionally with the choir from St. Paul's Cathedral and later studied English literature at the University of California in Los Angeles. During the 1960s, while working as an English teacher at a high school in San Diego, Drake wrote lyrics for The Kingston Trio and together with American actor Michael Storm, he co-founded The Good Time Singers, a folk group launched on The Andy Williams Show and released albums on the Capitol Records label.

By the late 1960s, Drake had abandoned his musical career and began working as a screenwriter. In 1971, he returned to Canada and settled on a farm in the Canadian Rockies with his wife Sally and their three sons. During this time, he wrote scripts for the American television series Then Came Bronson (1969–1970) and The Psychiatrist (1971). In 1975, Drake made his motion picture debut as both screenwriter and director of The Keeper, a low-budget Canadian horror film starring Christopher Lee which never received theatrical distribution; he also wrote the screenplay for the 1980 horror film Terror Train starring Jamie Lee Curtis.

Since 1984, Drake and his wife moved permanently to Vancouver to be near their family. His sons, Steven and Adam Drake, also became known as successful Canadian musicians, and third son Jono Drake works in the production end of the film and TV industry in Vancouver.

== Death ==
Thomas Y. Drake died of cancer on August 8, 2008, in Vancouver, British Columbia.

== Filmography ==
Year	Title	Director	Screenwriter	Notes
1969–1970	Then Came Bronson		Yes	TV series; 4 episodes
1971	The Psychiatrist		Yes	TV series; 1 episode
1976	The Keeper	Yes	Yes	Feature film; released in 1985
1980	Terror Train		Yes	Feature film
1986	Hamilton's Quest		Yes	TV series; 1 episode
1989	MacGyver		Yes	TV series; 1 episode
1990	Bordertown		Yes	TV series; 2 episodes
1990	The Adventures of the Black Stallion		Yes	TV series; 1 episode
1990	Neon Rider		Yes	TV series; 1 episode
