= Ian Tracey =

Canadian actor (born 1964)

- Born: June 26, 1964 (age 62); Vancouver Island, British Columbia, Canada
- Occupation: Actor
- Years active: 1976–present
- Children: 1

Ian Tracey (born June 26, 1964) is a Canadian actor. Over the years, Tracey has participated in more than 70 films and television series. Tracey has starred in series such as Da Vinci's Inquest and Intelligence. He is also known for his role as the title character in 1979's Huckleberry Finn and His Friends.

== Early life ==
Tracey was born in Vancouver, British Columbia, Canada on June 26, 1964. He grew up in British Columbia's Port Coquitlam.

== Career ==
Tracey started working at the age of 11, playing in the 1976 film The Keeper, starring Christopher Lee.

Tracey's recent feature film credits include Prozac Nation, Owning Mahowny, with Philip Seymour Hoffman, Kevin Costner's western Open Range, and Christopher Nolan's 2001 thriller Insomnia. In 1999, Tracey won the Leo Award for Best Performance by a Male in a Feature Length Drama for Rupert's Land.

Tracey has appeared in the title role of Milgaard, for which he won both the Gemini Award for Best Performance by an Actor in a Leading Role in a Dramatic Program or Mini-Series and Leo Award for Best Performance by a Male: Feature Length Drama in 2000.

Other television films include The Rookies, for which he received a 1991 Gemini nomination for Best Actor in a Supporting Role. He was nominated for a Gemini Award in 2000 for his portrayal of the talented Homicide Detective Mick Leary in the Canadian TV series Da Vinci's Inquest. He also directed two episodes in that television series, as well as two in Intelligence.

Tracey was a series regular on Sweating Bullets (also known as Tropical Heat) and had a recurring lead on The Commish. He was also seen in Taken and has guest starred on Smallville, Dark Angel, The Sentinel, The X-Files, The Outer Limits, Highlander: The Series, The Collector, 21 Jump Street and Mom P.I.

In 2005, Tracey was in the TV miniseries Prairie Giant: The Tommy Douglas Story and Intelligence, a CBC television series about the interactions between organized crime and government intelligence services. In Intelligence, Tracey plays the head of a third-generation crime family that built its fortune on rum-running before turning to dealing weed. He also appeared as Nova Group leader Daniel Armand in season three of the science fiction series The 4400 and guest-starred as Lincoln Cole in Smallville.

In 2010, he began the recurring role of villain Adam Worth on Sanctuary. In spring 2007, he filmed the Chinese-Canadian historical miniseries Iron Road with Sam Neill and Peter O'Toole and narrated the making-of documentary for the DVD release of the series Huckleberry Finn and His Friends. He also appeared in 4 seasons of Bates Motel as Remo Wallace. Since 2023 he has played Sheriff Baxter, father of Xavier, in School Spirits.

== Filmography ==
=== Film ===
Year	Title	Role	Notes
1976	The Keeper	Kid	
1978	In Praise of Older Women	Andras Vajda Jr.	
1983	Eureka	Joey	
1984	Change of Heart	Kenny	
1986	Fire with Fire	'Panther'	
1987	Stakeout	Caylor Reese	
1987	Shelley	Gord	
1989	American Boyfriends	Gerald	
1990	The Last Island	Jack	
1991	Crooked Hearts	'Limber' Watkins	
1993	Morning Glory	Orlan Nattes	
1994	Timecop	Confederate soldier	
1995	The War Between Us	'Jig' Parnum	
1995	Man with a Gun	Roy Burchill	
1995	For a Few Lousy Dollars	Zack	
1996	Trust in Me	Eddie Kelly	
1996	Carpool	Neil	
1997	Free Willy 3: The Rescue	Kron	
1998	Rupert's Land	Dale McKay	
1999	Touched	Eric	
2000	Dangerous Attraction	Detective Ryan Bell	
2001	The Waiting Room	Peter's Father	
2002	Liberty Stands Still	SWAT Commander Mac Munro	
2002	Insomnia	Warfield (voice)	
2003	Owning Mahowny	Detective Ben Lock	
2003	Open Range	Tom	
2003	Emile	Tom	
2003	Do Not Disturb	The Man	
2003	Cellmates	Sid	
2004	Ice Men	Trevor	
2005	Desolation Sound	Michael Elliott	
2006	Civic Duty	Lieutenant Randall Lloyd	
2011	Donovan's Echo	Ray	
2013	Man of Steel	Ludlow	
2013	Hell in a Handbag	Terrance	
2014	Aloft	Hans	
2015	Eadweard	Stanford	
2016	Dead Rising: Endgame	George Hancock	
2016	Hello Destroyer	Aaron Weller	
2018	Rabbit	Timmy	
2019	A Score to Settle	'Tank'	
2020	Endless	Richard	
2023	Peter Pan & Wendy	Sallyport	

=== Television ===
Year	Title	Role	Notes
1976	Dreamspeaker	Peter	TV film
1980	Huckleberry Finn and His Friends	Huckleberry Finn	Main role
1981	The Minikins	Albi	TV series
1982	Hangin' In	Randy	Episode: "Days of Wine and Rabbis"
1987	The New Adventures of Beans Baxter	Doug	Episode: "Beans' Wicked and Awesome Adventures at College"
1987–1989	21 Jump Street	Cosmo / Lieutenant Taubman / Matty / Angelo's Buddy	Episodes: "After School Special", "Raising Marijuana", "Swallowed Alive", "Orpheus 3.3"
1988	Knightwatch	John O'Neill	Episodes: "Knights of the City", "Friday Knight"
1988	Danger Bay	Jerry Langstrom	Episode: "Fire Jumper"
1988	Street Legal	Arnold	Episode: "Cat and Mouse"
1989	C.B.C.'s Magic Hour	Pat Hebler	Episode: "Rookies"
1990	Neon Rider	Cameron	Episode: "Confessions"
1991	Conspiracy of Silence	Dwayne Johnston	TV miniseries
1991–1995	The Commish	John Hibbs	Recurring role (seasons 1–4)
1992	The Comrades of Summer	Andy	TV film
1992	Home Movie	Bob	TV film
1992–1993	Tropical Heat	'Spider' Garvin	Main role (seasons 2–3); also known as Sweating Bullets
1993	Miracle on Interstate 880	Mark Helm	TV film
1994	Incident at Deception Ridge	Del Hayes	TV film
1994	Lonesome Dove: The Series	Billy	Episode: "Judgement Day"
1995	The X-Files	Leonard 'Rappo' Trimble	Episode: "The Walk"
1996	Bloodhounds II	Matthew Standing	TV film
1996	The Adventures of Sinbad	Mustapha	Episodes: "Return of Sinbad: Parts 1 & 2"
1996	Highlander: The Series	Johnny Kelly	Episode: "Glory Days"
1996–2000	The Outer Limits	Mr. Tarkman / Declan McMahon	Episodes: "Trial by Fire", "Judgment Day"
1997	Murder in My Mind	Leonard	TV film
1997	Survival on the Mountain	Eric	TV film
1997	Dead Man's Gun	Joe 'Wild Joe' Tate	Episode: "The Impostor"
1997	Medusa's Child	Peter Cooke	TV film
1997–1999	Poltergeist: The Legacy	Mike McCready	Episodes: "The Devil's Lighthouse", "She's Got the Devil in Her Heart"
1997–1998	Viper	Mickey Finch	Episodes: "Triple Cross", "What Makes Sammy Chun?"
1998	Dirty Little Secret	Ray	TV film
1998	Welcome to Paradox	Cole	Episode: "The Winner"
1998–2005	Da Vinci's Inquest	Detective Mick Leary	Main role
1999	Milgaard	David Milgaard	TV film
1999	The Sentinel	Jack Bartley	Episode: "The Sentinel by Blair Sandburg"
2000	The Man Who Used to Be Me	Grant Logan	TV film
2000	First Wave	Garvin	Episode: "Still at Large"
2001	Dark Angel	B.C.	Episode: "Haven"
2001	Trapped	Captain Al Becker	TV film
2002	Stargate SG-1	Smith	Episode: "Prometheus"
2002	Taken	Bill Walker	TV miniseries
2003	The Dead Zone	Marc Dionne	Episode: "The Mountain"
2004	Call Me: The Rise and Fall of Heidi Fleiss	Sergeant Willeford	TV film
2004	The Life	Matt	TV film
2005–2007	Intelligence	Jimmy Reardon	Main role
2005–2006	Da Vinci's City Hall	Detective Mick Leary	Main role
2006	The Collector	Timothy Albert	Episode: "The Customer Service Rep"
2006	Prairie Giant	Charlie Lawson	TV miniseries
2006	Smallville	Lincoln Cole	Episode: "Mercy"
2006	The 4400	Daniel Armand	Episodes: "The New World", "Gone: Part 2", "Graduation Day"
2009–2015	Heartland	Wade	Recurring role
2010	Republic of Doyle	Bill Gorsky	Episode: "The Return of the Grievous Angel"
2010	Keep Your Head Up, Kid: The Don Cherry Story	Harry Sinden	TV miniseries
2010	Rookie Blue	Ray Donald Swann	Episode: "Big Nickel"
2010	Flashpoint	Nick Watson	Episode: "The Other Lane"
2010	The Cult	Thomas	TV film
2010–2011	Sanctuary	Adam Worth	Recurring role (seasons 3–4)
2011	Shattered	Ethan Quinn	Episodes: "Finding the Boy"
2011	Hell on Wheels	Bolan	Recurring role (season 1)
2012	The Listener	Pinto	Episode: "The Bank Job"
2012	True Justice	Dr. Zee	Episodes: "Blood Alley", "All In"
2012	Ring of Fire	Hector Janen	TV miniseries
2012–2017	Supernatural	Lee Chambers / Ishim	Episodes: "Adventures in Babysitting", "Lily Sunder Has Some Regrets"
2012–2015	Continuum	Jason	Recurring role
2013	Rogue	Lucas 'Mitch' Mitchell	Main role (season 1)
2013	Cedar Cove	Bobby	Episode: Pilot
2013–2017	Bates Motel	Remo Wallace	Recurring role (seasons 1–2), guest role (season 5)
2014	Strange Empire	Roy Arnold	Episode: "The Whiskey Trader"
2015	The 100	Vincent Vie	Episodes: "Resurrection", "Bodyguard of Lies", "Blood Must Have Blood: Part 1"
2015	Backstrom	Julien Gaynor	Episode: "I Like to Watch"
2015	Wayward Pines	Franklin Dobbs	Episodes: "Betrayal", "The Friendliest Place on Earth", "A Reckoning"
2015	Killjoys	Lucas Kotler	Episode: "One Blood"
2015–2016	The Romeo Section	'Fergie'	Main role
2016	Motive	Ian Mitchell	Episode: "In Plain Sight"
2016–2017	Incorporated	Terrence	Main role
2016–2018	Travelers	Ray Green	Recurring role
2019–2020	The Order	Jurgen Sawyer / Diego Nunez	Episodes: "Undeclared, Part 2", "Finals, Part 2", "Free Radicals, part 1"
2019–2020	Project Blue Book	The Fixer	Recurring role
2019	The Murders	Grant David Alcott	Episode: "In My Feelings"
2019–present	Virgin River	Jimmy	Recurring role
2023	Fire Country	Wes Brooks	Episode: "Happy to Help"
2023–present	School Spirits	Sheriff Baxter	Recurring role
2024	Law & Order Toronto: Criminal Intent	Mayor Craig McCreigh	Episode: "Crack Reporter"
2024	Billy the Kid	Frank Baker	Recurring Role
2024	The Good Doctor	Richard Shelford	Episode: "Skin in the Game"
2024	Hudson & Rex	Vic Mason	Episode: "Doghouse"
2026	Neagley	Boone Riley	Episodes: "Lebron's No Jordan", "Touched"
