= The Keeper (1976 film) =

- Directed by: T.Y. Drake
- Written by: T.Y. Drake
- Story by: David Curnick; Donald Wilson
- Produced by: Donald Wilson
- Starring: Christopher Lee; Tell Schreiber; Sally Gray; Ross Vezarian; Ian Tracey
- Cinematography: Doug McKay
- Edited by: Sally Paterson; George Johnson
- Music by: Erich Hoyt
- Production companies: Lionsgate Productions Ltd. Canadian Film Development Corporation
- Distributed by: CBS (TV); InterGlobal Home Video (VHS)
- Release dates: April 1976 (premiere); December 19, 1985 (CBS)
- Running time: 88 minutes
- Country: Canada
- Language: English
- Budget: $135,000 CAD$

The Keeper is a 1976 Canadian comedy-thriller film written and directed by T.Y. Drake and starring Christopher Lee in the title role. The film was never released theatrically and went straight to television.

== Synopsis ==
Christopher Lee is The Keeper, the sinister and crippled administrator of the secluded and exclusive Underwood Asylum in 1947 British Columbia where the community's wealthiest families have entrusted their mentally-disturbed relatives to his unique care. However, these families soon begin to die under grisly and unusual circumstances, leaving large inheritances to The Keeper's deranged patients.

Dick Driver (Tell Schreiber) is a private investigator hired by a mysterious client to investigate Underwood Asylum and he soon discovers the connection between The Keeper's therapy and the millionaires' deaths.

== Cast ==
- Christopher Lee as The Keeper
- Tell Schreiber as Dick Driver
- Sally Gray as Mae B. Jones
- Ross Vezarian as Inspector Clarke
- Ian Tracey as The Kid
- Bing Jensen as Danny
- Jack and Leo Leavy as The Biggs Twins

== Production and release ==
The Keeper was filmed on a budget of $135,000 in Vancouver, British Columbia from October 1 to 24, 1975.

T.Y. Drake first became involved in the production as a writer, called in for a rewrite after the original proposal had been made to the Canadian Film Development Corporation (CFDC) by producer Donald Wilson. When the original director left the production, the project was later resubmitted with Drake as director, and accepted.

Although never released theatrically and shelved for nearly a decade, The Keeper went straight to television and finally premiered on December 19, 1985 as part of The CBS Late Movie. In 1987, the film was released on VHS by InterGlobal Home Video (Canada) and has long been out of print.
