= Black Dawn (2005 film) =

- DVD cover
- Directed by: Alexander Gruszynski
- Written by: Martin Wheeler
- Produced by: Kamal Aboukhater; Steven Seagal; Andrew Stevens
- Starring: Steven Seagal; Tamara Davies; John Pyper-Ferguson
- Cinematography: Bruce McCleery
- Edited by: Todd C. Ramsay
- Music by: David Wurst; Eric Wurst
- Production companies: Sony Pictures Home Entertainment; Andrew Stevens Entertainment
- Distributed by: Sony Pictures Home Entertainment
- Release date: December 27, 2005
- Running time: 95 minutes
- Country: United States
- Language: English
- Budget: $8 million

Black Dawn (also known as Foreigner 2: Black Dawn) is a 2005 American action film directed by Alexander Gruszynski in his feature film directorial debut. It was produced by, and stars, Steven Seagal, who reprises his role as Jonathan Cold. It is a follow-up to the 2003 film The Foreigner.

== Plot ==
Former-CIA agent Jonathan Cold is hired to break James Donovan out of prison. Jon takes James to see his brother, arms dealer Michael Donovan. The Donovans hire Jon to help sell parts for a small nuclear bomb to Nicholi (Nicholas Davidoff), the leader of a Chechen terrorist group planning to blow up Los Angeles. Meanwhile, Jon's former protégé, agent Amanda Stuart, is caught spying on the Donovans. Jon rescues Amanda and they go on the run, trying to keep the Donovans out of the way and stop Nicholi from blowing up LA.

== Cast ==
- Steven Seagal as Jonathan Cold
- Tamara Davies as CIA Agent Amanda Stuart
- John Pyper-Ferguson as James Donovan
- Julian Stone as Michael Donovan
- Nicholas Davidoff as Nicholi
- Roman Varshavsky as Fedor
- Conal Duffy as Cab Driver
- Andrew Stevens as Security Guard
- Timothy Carhart as Anthony Greer
- Angela Gots as Stazi
