= Terror Train =

1980 Canadian horror film by Roger Spottiswoode

- American theatrical release poster
- Directed by: Roger Spottiswoode
- Written by: T. Y. Drake
- Produced by: Harold Greenberg
- Starring: Ben Johnson; Jamie Lee Curtis; Hart Bochner
- Cinematography: John Alcott
- Edited by: Anne Henderson
- Music by: John Mills-Cockell
- Production companies: Astral Bellevue Pathé; Sandy Howard Productions; Triple T Productions
- Distributed by: Astral Films
- Release dates: October 3, 1980 (US); October 10, 1980 (Canada)
- Running time: 97 minutes
- Country: Canada
- Language: English
- Budget: $2.7 million
- Box office: $8 million

Terror Train is a 1980 Canadian slasher film directed by Roger Spottiswoode and written by Thomas Y. Drake, and starring Jamie Lee Curtis, Ben Johnson, Hart Bochner, Timothy Webber, Anthony Sherwood, Vanity and David Copperfield. The film follows a group of pre-medical school students holding a New Year's Eve costume party on a vintage excursion train who are targeted by a killer who dons their costumes.

The concept for the film was based on an idea by executive producer Daniel Grodnik, who sought to make a movie inspired by Halloween (1978) set on a train. A full-length script for the film was composed by T. Y. Drake, and production began within four months. The film was shot in Montreal between late November and late December 1979, shortly after Curtis had completed filming for Prom Night (1980). Terror Train had a primarily Canadian cast and crew to qualify for a tax credit.

An independently produced film, Terror Train was purchased for distribution by the major studio 20th Century Fox, which had yet to release a slasher film; the studio spent an estimated $5 million on an expansive marketing campaign for the film. It was released theatrically in the United States on October 3, 1980, grossing $8 million during its theatrical run. The film's gross disappointed 20th Century Fox, falling short of their expectations for $40–50 million. Writer David Grove attributed the movie's box office performance to an oversaturation of the slasher film market.

Terror Train garnered a mixed reception, with several reviewers considering it an above-average example of its subgenre. Critics noted the film's themes of revenge, illusion, and genderbending. Terror Train became a cult classic, inspiring a remake in 2022, which was followed by a sequel that same year.

== Plot ==
At a university fraternity's New Year's Eve party, a reluctant Alana Maxwell is pressured into a prank: she lures the awkward, virginal pledge Kenny Hampson into a bedroom under the promise of sex. Instead, he discovers a corpse stolen from the medical school in the bed. Traumatized, Kenny is committed to a psychiatric hospital.

Three years later, members of the same fraternities and sororities hold a New Year's Eve costume party aboard a train. Attendees include Alana, her best friend Mitchy, her boyfriend Mo, class clown Ed, prank ringleader Doc, and Jackson, along with a magician and his female assistant hired to entertain the students.

Ed is murdered before boarding, and the killer dons his Groucho Marx mask to move among the students unnoticed. As the train travels into the wilderness, he continues his killings: Jackson is murdered in the sleeper bathroom, and when conductor Carne investigates, the killer conceals the body and dons Jackson's lizard costume, fooling brakeman Charlie. Mitchy is killed in her compartment, Mo is found dead during a magic show, and two crew members are later discovered murdered. Carne sequesters the students while porters uncover yet another corpse. Pulling the emergency brake throws everyone off balance, and the porters escort the students off, many thinking it is another of Doc's stunts.

Alana suspects Kenny and recalls visiting him at the hospital, learning of his disturbed state. Doc seals himself in a sleeper car but is decapitated, and Alana mistakes the magician for Kenny. Pursued through the train, she discovers the magician dead and finds Kenny, dressed in Charlie's uniform, revealing that he has been posing in drag as the magician's female assistant.

Alana apologizes for the original prank, but Kenny refuses to forgive her and forces her to kiss him. The kiss triggers a traumatic relapse, leaving him vulnerable. Carne arrives and beats Kenny with a shovel, causing him to fall from the train into an icy river as it speeds away.

== Cast ==
- Ben Johnson as Carne
- Jamie Lee Curtis as Alana Maxwell
- Hart Bochner as Doc
- Sandee Currie as Mitchy
- Timothy Webber as Mo
- Derek MacKinnon as Kenny Hampson
- Anthony Sherwood as Jackson
- Joy Boushel as Pet
- Vanity as Merry (credited as D.D. Winters)
- Greg Swanson as Class President
- Howard Busgang as Ed
- David Copperfield as The Magician

== Production ==
=== Conception ===
After Halloween (1978) grossed nearly $60 million, film producers wanted to exploit its success, leading to a horror movie boom in the following two years. Film critic Roger Ebert said horror movies made in the wake of Halloween tended to include attacks on young girls, knives, and blood. Producer Daniel Grodnik had the idea for the film's central narrative, which he had wanted to be "like Halloween on a train". He also drew inspiration from the comedy-thriller Silver Streak (1976), which was set on a train. He discussed the concept with his wife, who thought it sounded terrible. Grodnik then coined the title Terrible Train. Grodnik had been a friend of Halloween director John Carpenter and producer Debra Hill, both of whom gave him their blessing when he told them of his idea. Grodnik pitched the film to American producer Sandy Howard, who was impressed by the concept. Afterward, Grodnik wrote a twelve-page version of the film's story.

The film was the first motion picture directed by Roger Spottiswoode (a former editor for Sam Peckinpah), who was hired to direct the film by Howard on the condition that he also edit it. Anne Henderson was later brought in to edit. Because it was made under a Canadian tax shelter, Daniel Grodnik was appointed executive producer, as he was legally unable to serve as a primary producer. The film became one of the first American-Canadian co-productions ever.

There was no stage show magician in the original script, but producer Howard was a fan of magic tricks and illusions, so a magician character was written in. Prior to pre-production, the film's title changed from Terrible Train to Switchback to Train to Terror to Terror Train.

=== Casting ===
It just seemed like a classy picture on all levels. Roger was a good director, and great at cutting scenes together, and good at communicating with actors. John Alcott was just a genius and the way he controlled the lights was amazing because he would look at the grid, see what light was needed, and talk through the radio in this funny English voice and the lights would appear on cue. I knew, if nothing else, that it was going to be a beautifully-shot picture, just because John Alcott was there.

— Jamie Lee Curtis

Since the film was made under a Canadian tax shelter, nearly all of its cast and crew had to be Canadian. Grodnik sought Jamie Lee Curtis for the lead role of Alana Maxwell based on her performance in Halloween. After Halloween, Curtis auditioned for many films, but only received offers for horror parts. She didn't feel she was in a position to turn them down.

Curtis completed filming another slasher film, Paul Lynch's Prom Night (1980), which she filmed in Toronto, shortly before filming for Terror Train began. She felt Alana was similar to the character she played in Prom Night, but stronger and more sophisticated. Curtis hoped she could add depth to the character. She didn't see Terror Train as too derivative of Halloween and liked its train setting, though she preferred the title Switchback to the "gimmicky" Terror Train.

Veteran actor Ben Johnson was cast as Carne, the train conductor, whom Grodnik said was "amused" to have been in a horror film amongst such a young cast. He took the role out of fondness for Spottiswoode, whom he had worked with on The Getaway (1972), with the caveat that some vulgar words be removed from the film's script. The majority of the supporting cast was made of Canadian actors, including Hart Bochner, Sandee Currie and Anthony Sherwood. The film included a number of untrained actors, including Derek MacKinnon in the role of the villain, as well as illusionist David Copperfield as the Magician, and singer Vanity as one of the partygoers. Vanity was credited under the name D.D. Winters.

Howard, a fan of magic tricks, approached Copperfield to be in the film. By that point, Copperfield had appeared in two successful network television specials and wanted to begin an acting career. He agreed to be in Terror Train, though he was nervous to make his debut in a feature film. The casting of three mid-level celebrities—Curtis, Johnson, and Copperfield—was unheard of for a slasher movie of that time period.

MacKinnon, a local cross-dressing performer, was cast as Kenny, the movie's killer. He knew little about movies or Curtis when he tried out for the role, but his audition was welcome because of his background in drag. In his recollection, the actors were not told about the film's story or Curtis' involvement while they auditioned. During the audition, Spottiswoode called MacKinnon "a sissy" and "a fag" in order to anger him. When MacKinnon got angry, Spottiswoode was pleased, feeling that MacKinnon's anger displayed what was necessary for the role of Kenny. MacKinnon was not sure how to respond to that treatment, as he had never made a film before.

=== Set construction ===
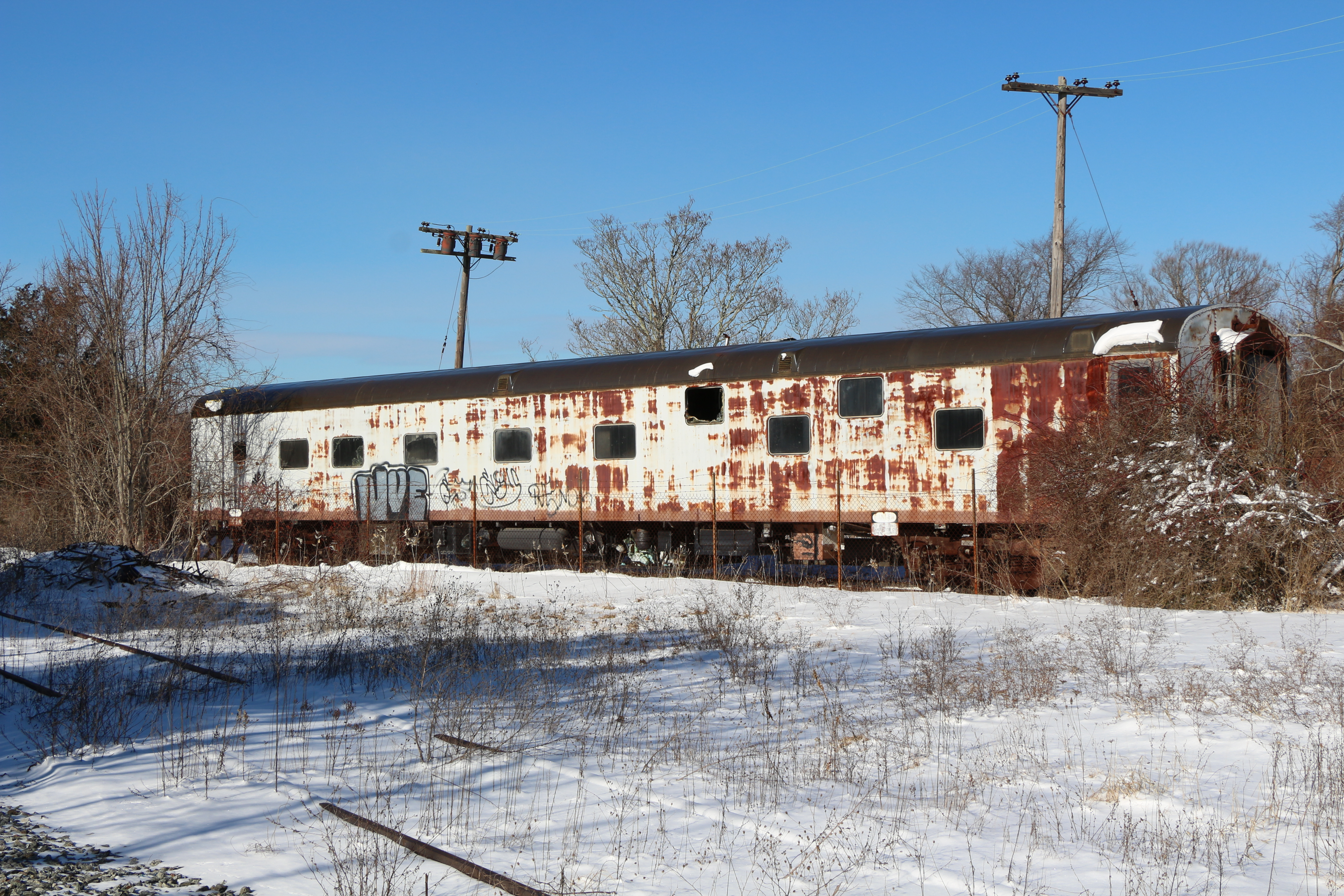
Sleeper used in the film, located along a siding in Sandwich, Massachusetts in 2014

To create the train for the film, the producers leased an actual Canadian Pacific Railway steam locomotive from the Steamtown Foundation in Bellows Falls, Vermont. The train's locomotive was renumbered from its original 1293 to #1881, and, along with five stainless-steel passenger cars, painted black with silver stripes. Afterwards, the Steamtown Foundation reverted the engine back to its original number 1293 and had it restored to a historic paint and letter scheme. Production designer, Glenn Bywdwell, crafted the interiors of the train in an Art Deco style. As of January 2021, Canadian Pacific Railway No. 1293 continues to be an "operable locomotive".

=== Filming ===
Principal photography for Terror Train mainly took place in and around Montreal, Quebec, Canada. To qualify for a tax credit, the movie had to be completed by the end of 1979. The shoot began on November 21, 1979, and was completed on December 23. The bulk of the film's train sequences were shot first, while the film's opening sequence was shot on December 22, the penultimate day of the shoot; filming of it took place at a real fraternity house belonging to McGill University. The final day of shooting (December 23) consisted of a small crew completing the footage of Kenny's body plummeting from the train into a frozen river below, which was shot on location in New Hampshire, United States. The stunt man was reportedly unable to withstand the freezing temperature of the water, leading art director Guy Comtois to play the part of the dead killer instead.

The interior train sequences posed numerous obstacles for the crew, specifically cinematographer John Alcott, who devised a unique method of lighting Terror Train given the limited space and scant natural lighting of the sets: he rewired the entire train and mounted individual dimmers on the exteriors of the carriage cars. Using a variety of bulbs with different wattages, and controlling them with the external dimmers, Alcott could light the set in a very fast, efficient manner. At times, Alcott also used medical lights (pen torches) to hand light the actors' faces, as well as Christmas lights. To capture some of the film's footage, Alcott used a small lens he had previously used while shooting Barry Lyndon (1975). To achieve the rocking motion of a real train on film, a crew was appointed to push on each side of the stationary train car in order for the interior sequences to appear as though they were taking place on a moving train.

Taking a cue from director John Ford, Ben Johnson originally asked director Spottiswoode to give his character Carne less dialogue in Terror Train, rather than more. Curtis had the idea that Alana should kiss Kenny to add tenderness to the film: "All during filming, I was looking for ways to make my character more interesting but there weren't many opportunities because most of the film was about the action and the killer".

MacKinnon's involvement in the project was kept secret so as not to spoil the film's transsexual twist. To flesh out his character, MacKinnon came up with a backstory for Kenny where he killed his mother while backing out of his driveway. Spottiswoode had MacKinnon take boxing lessons so he would develop an angry and aggressive personality for Terror Train. MacKinnon butted heads with director Spottiswoode during the shoot, which Spottiswoode claimed was a result of his inexperience: "He wasn't an actor. He was a transvestite from the streets of Montreal, and he wasn't familiar with the concepts of a contract and showing up for work on time. In a strange way though he did a pretty good job. He was familiar with that world of cheap theater and was strangely effective".

== Themes ==
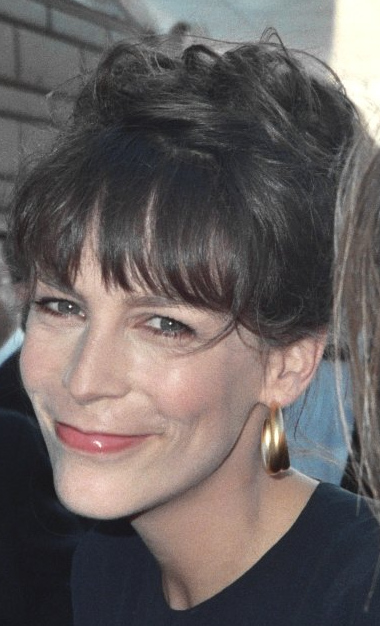
Author David Grove connected Terror Train's "transsexual theme" to rumours Jamie Lee Curtis (pictured here in 1989) was intersex.

The motivation for the villain in Terror Train, similar to other slasher films, is revenge. Ebert said the film contains a stock plot "in which a horrible event from several years ago causes terrible revenge during a gala event in the present." He said the movie's story resembled that of Prom Night. Paul Brener of AllMovie said Terror Train merely had the generic slasher film set-up.

Film scholar John Kenneth Muir notes, the film's central organizing principle is "magic, or the often undetectable gulf between reality and illusion.... In other words, characters live and die in Terror Train based, in large part, on how they perceive the reality or non-reality around them". Muir adds: "If the would-be victims can see through the illusion, they tend to survive. If they can't do so, they die. It's as simple that, but this approach makes Terror Train a more complex and layered film than the average slasher picture". Zachary Paul of Bloody Disgusting said Terror Train makes it clear from the beginning that Kenny is the killer. However, the film misleads the audience into thinking The Magician could be Kenny after achieving a more muscular physique. On the other hand, Ebert felt it is not initially clear whether the killer is Kenny or another one of the passengers.

In Dead Funny: The Humor of American Horror, David Gillota contextualized Terror Train as one of many horror films with "trans-coded or cross-dressing" monsters. Gillota cites The Devil-Doll (1936), Psycho (1960), Homicidal (1961), The Texas Chain Saw Massacre (1974), Dressed to Kill (1980), Sleepaway Camp (1983), The Silence of the Lambs (1991), and Insidious: Chapter 2 (2013) as other examples. Gillota said all these films could be interpreted as transphobic. He wrote, "[T]he image of a knife-wielding gender nonconformist (usually a man in a wig and a dress) is remarkably common in horror and may simply reinforce the widespread demonization of transgender individuals." Gillota said films with this trope usually predate conversations about transgender identity becoming widespread and mainstream. Paul of Bloody Disgusting said the twist from Psycho inspired other horror films with genderfuck reveals. He criticized Terror Train and similar films for equating queerness with derangement but noted the makers of these films didn't intend to offend anyone. Paul added gender reveal twists in slasher films are likely going out of style, and that's a good thing.

In Jamie Lee Curtis: Scream Queen, David Grove connected Terror Train's "transsexual theme" to contemporary tabloid rumours that Curtis was an intersex individual born with male and female genitalia. Grove said the rumor originated from Curtis' tomboyish nature. Grove argues that Curtis' character displays a masculine sexuality following her kiss with Kenny, after which she acts like a savage animal concerned only with survival.

== Release ==
The film was purchased for theatrical release in the United States by 20th Century Fox, who had recently garnered attention with the release of Star Wars (1977). The studio spent an estimated $5 million on an advertising campaign for the film, which would be their only foray into the slasher film sub-genre during its peak years. The campaign included billboards and trade advertisements, as well as several posters: the first one-sheet featured the killer dressed in the Groucho Marx mask, brandishing a knife; a second one-sheet emphasized the film's college youth setting, including the same image of the killer with a bonfire and a train in the foreground. Regarding the movie's release, Howard told Variety "I think we will just about slip in before the market becomes too saturated." Three of Curtis' horror films were released in 1980: Terror Train, Prom Night, and The Fog.

== Home media ==
The film was first released on VHS home video in 1988 by CBS/Fox Video. The film was released twice on DVD by 20th Century Fox; once on September 7, 2004, as a single edition release and again on September 9, 2008, in a triple pack alongside Candyman: Farewell to the Flesh (1995) and The Fog.

Shout! Factory released a collector's edition Blu-ray and DVD combo-pack under their Scream Factory label on October 16, 2012. Scorpion Releasing released a new limited edition Blu-ray edition on July 22, 2019, exclusively through Ronin Flix. Scorpion released a general retail Blu-ray edition of the film on April 7, 2020, in association with Kino Lorber.

In the UK, 88 Films released a limited-edition Blu-ray on November 4, 2019, with a new HD transfer plus extra bonus content.

Kino Lorber reissued the film on 4K UHD Blu-ray and standard Blu-ray format on May 26, 2026.

== Reception ==
=== Box office ===
Terror Train opened in the United States on October 3, 1980, and grossed an estimated $8 million at the box office on a budget of $3.5 million. 20th Century Fox executives noted that the slasher film Friday the 13th (1980) had become a blockbuster. After Friday the 13th grossed $39.7 million, the executives expected Terror Train to gross between $40 million and $50 million. When the film failed to do so, 20th Century Fox considered it a huge failure. It released in Canada on October 10, 1980. Grove wrote that the slasher film market was oversaturated in 1980 and 1981, with the release of Terror Train, Friday the 13th, Prom Night, New Year's Evil (1980), Maniac (1980), Mother's Day (1980), He Knows You're Alone (1980), Funeral Home (1980), Graduation Day (1981), Hell Night (1981), My Bloody Valentine (1981), Night School (1981), Student Bodies (1981), and The Burning (1981). Only the grosses of Friday the 13th and Prom Night would live up to industry expectations. According to Ebert, the success of Porky's (1981) caused Hollywood to pivot from teen slasher films to teen sex movies.

=== Critical response ===
==== Contemporary ====
Variety deemed the film "competent" in a mildly positive review, while Ebert gave the film one out of four stars, writing: "The classic horror films of the 1930s appealed to the intelligence of its audiences, to their sense of humor and irony. Movies like Terror Train, and all of its sordid predecessors and its rip-offs still to come, just don't care. They're a series of sensations, strung together on a plot. Any plot will do. Just don't forget the knife, and the girl, and the blood". However, he conceded that "it's not a rock-bottom-budget, schlock exploitation film". Ed Blank of the Pittsburgh Press criticized the film for its lack of characterization, saying the movie was not as good as its "neat" title.

A review in the Los Angeles Times praised the film's atmosphere and characterized it as scary. Richard Corliss of Time also praised the film's style, calling it "sleek and eerie". Bill Kelley of the Fort Lauderdale News was critical of the film's illogical plot developments and clichés, but ultimately deemed it "a respectable (if that's the word) exploitation movie". Jacqi Tully of the Arizona Daily Star wrote a similarly favourable review of the film, praising it for its pacing, setting, performances, and Copperfield's magic tricks. Writing for the Statesman Journal, Ron Cowan commended the cinematography and noted that although the film started poorly, it had some thrills near its end.

At the 8th Saturn Awards, Terror Train was nominated for Best International Film, losing to Scanners (1981), while Curtis was nominated for Best Actress, losing to Angie Dickinson for Dressed to Kill. At the 2nd Genie Awards, Terror Train was nominated for Best Achievement in Art Direction (Glenn Bydwell), Best Achievement in Overall Sound (David Appleby and Bo Harwood), and Best Music Score (John Mills-Cockell).

==== Retrospective ====
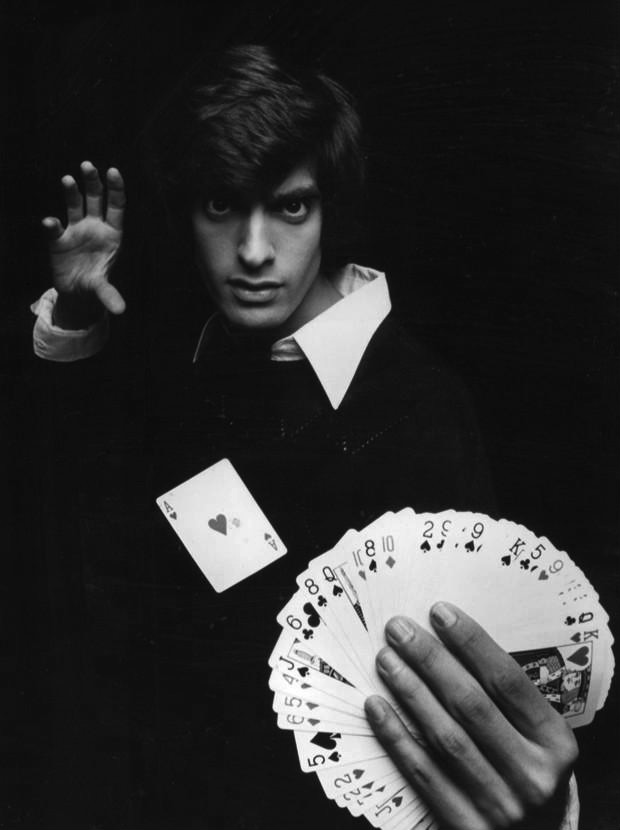
Some retrospective reviews of Terror Train praised David Copperfield's (pictured here in 1977) appearance in the film.

Rolling Stone dismissed the film but singled out its cast and crew, noting the "marquee talent" of Copperfield, Johnson, Spottiswoode, Alcott, and Vanity, each of whom "went on to better things." AllMovie praised Alcott's cinematography, but concluded Terror Train is middling and only of interest to devoted slasher film fans, while Time Out London said it was better than other films of its type. A review in Leonard Maltin's Movie Guide concurred, claiming that the "stylish photography and the novelty of the killer donning the costume of each successive victim lift this slightly above most in this disreputable genre," granting the film two out of four stars.

Paul Lê of Bloody Disgusting wrote Terror Train is an imperfect film with dull murder sequences. However, he felt the film's strengths outweighed its flaws, praising Copperfield's role. Film scholar Adam Rockoff praised the film for being stylish and atmospheric. Horror fiction scholar John Kenneth Muir also praised the film in his book Horror Films of the 1980s: "The thrill of a picture like Terror Train is the shrewd manner in which it plays against audience expectations; the sense that the slasher film paradigm gives it parameters which it can then undercut, subvert, and if needs be, violate". Zachary Paul of Bloody Disgusting said Terror Train is not as acclaimed as other slasher films starring Curtis, but deemed it a personal favourite. Paul praised the film's suspenseful third act and twist ending, adding that slasher fans should seek out the movie. Patrick Fogerty of Collider deemed Terror Train the most fun and subversive 1980s teen slasher movie. He praised it for having intelligent characters, as well as the racially diverse casting of Sherwood and Vanity. Terror Train is considered a cult classic.

On the review aggregator website Rotten Tomatoes, Terror Train holds a 47% approval rating based on 17 critic reviews, with an average rating of 5.1/10. Metacritic, which uses a weighted average, assigned the film a score of 42 out of 100, based on 9 critics, indicating "mixed or average" reviews.

== Remake ==
The film Train (2008) started as a remake of Terror Train before evolving into an original project. Train is also a horror film set on a train and it stars Thora Birch. Paul Lê of Bloody Disgusting notes many older slasher films got remade in the 2000s, but Terror Train was not one of them.

A remake of Terror Train, set on Halloween, was produced by Tubi and Canadian company Incendo Productions. It was also shot in Montreal and was released on Tubi's streaming platform on October 21, 2022. The film was produced by Graham Ludlow and Kaleigh Kavanagh, directed by Philippe Gagnon, and written by Ian Carpenter and Aaron Martin. Included in the cast are Robyn Alomar as Alana, Tim Rozon as the magician, and Mary Walsh as Carne. According to Lê of Bloody Disgusting, Terror Train (2022) is very faithful to the original film, reusing many of the same situations, costumes, and character names, though the later film is more violent. The remake debuted at No. 1 on Tubi and became the platform's most popular title on Halloween 2022. The remake scored 8% on review aggregator Rotten Tomatoes, based on 12 reviews. Lê felt Terror Train (2022) is suitable only for audiences unfamiliar with the original.

The sequel, Terror Train 2, was released on December 31, 2022, also on Tubi. The sequel revolves around characters from Terror Train (2022) having to survive another ride on the same locomotive. Terror Train 2 was also directed by Gagnon and also stars Alomar.

== See also ==
- List of cult films: T
- List of films set on trains
- List of New Year's Eve films

== Works cited ==
- Gillota, David (2023). Dead Funny: The Humor of American Horror. New Brunswick, N.J.: Rutgers University Press. ISBN 978-1-978-83418-7.
- Grove, David (2015). Jamie Lee Curtis: Scream Queen. Albany, Georgia: BearManor Media. ISBN 978-1-59393-608-2. OCLC 840902442.
- Muir, John Kenneth (2012). Horror Films of the 1980s. Vol. 1. Jefferson, N.C.: McFarland. ISBN 978-0-786-47298-7. OCLC 840902442.
- Nowell, Richard (2010). Blood Money: A History of the First Teen Slasher Film Cycle. Bloomsbury USA. ISBN 978-1-441-18850-2.
- Rockoff, Adam (2016). Going to Pieces: The Rise and Fall of the Slasher Film, 1978–1986. McFarland. ISBN 978-0-786-49192-6.
