= Man with a Gun (1995 film) =

- Directed by: David Wyles
- Written by: Laurie Finstad-Knizhnik
- Produced by: Robert K. MacLean
- Starring: Michael Madsen; Jennifer Tilly
- Cinematography: Jan Kiesser
- Music by: George Blondheim
- Release date: 1995
- Language: English

Man with a Gun (also known as Hired for Killing) is a 1995 Canadian-American action thriller film directed by David Wyles, and starring Michael Madsen, Jennifer Tilly, Gary Busey and Robert Loggia. It is based on the novel The Shroud Society by Hugh C. Rae.

== Plot ==
An assassin is hired to kill the woman he loves.

== Cast ==
- Michael Madsen as John Wilbur Hardin
- Jennifer Tilly as Rena Rushton / Kathy Payne
- Gary Busey as Jack Rushton
- Robert Loggia as Philip Marquand
- Ian Tracey as Roy Burchill
- Bill Cobbs as Henry Griggs
- Bill Dow as Ed Quigley
- Jason Schombing as Eli Spindel
- Mina E. Mina as Max Appleman
