= Da Vinci's City Hall =

- Created by: Chris Haddock
- Starring: Nicholas Campbell; Venus Terzo; Ian Tracey; Benjamin Ratner
- Country of origin: Canada
- No. of seasons: 1
- No. of episodes: 13

Production
- Executive producers: Laszlo Barna; Chris Haddock
- Running time: 45 minutes
- Production companies: Haddock Entertainment; Barna-Alper Productions

Original release
- Network: CBC
- Release: October 25, 2005 – February 28, 2006

Related
- Da Vinci's Inquest

Da Vinci's City Hall is a Canadian drama television series that premiered on CBC Television on 25 October 2005 and ended on 28 February 2006. It is a spin-off of the long-running Canadian series Da Vinci's Inquest. The creator, writer and executive producer of the series is Chris Haddock.

== Overview ==
Nicholas Campbell reprises his role as Dominic Da Vinci, a former coroner entering municipal politics as the mayor of Vancouver, British Columbia. Da Vinci is based on the real-life experiences of Larry Campbell, the former chief coroner of Vancouver who was elected that city's mayor in 2002.

With the series regular Ian Tracey (playing Mick Leary) inheriting the coroner's job, the show toggles back and forth between crime scenes and politics. Haddock says: "My approach was to make all the political stuff criminal and all the criminal stuff political. When we're in city hall we're really about conspiracy and scheming, who's crooked and who's going to get caught."

== Cast ==
- Nicholas Campbell as Dominic da Vinci
- Mylene Dinh-Robic as Rita Mah
- Benjamin Ratner as Sam Berger
- Ian Tracey as Coroner Mick Leary
- Venus Terzo as Detective Angela Kosmo
- Brian Markinson as Police Chief Bill Jacobs
- Fred Keating as Councillor Jack Pierce
- Simone Bailly as Constable Jan Ferris
- Stephen E. Miller
- Evan Adams
- Colin Cunningham as Detective Brian Curtis
- Patrick Gallagher as Joe Finn
- Dean Marshall as Detective Carter
- Terence Kelly as Fire Chief Ed Welles
- Rebecca Robins
- Hrothgar Mathews as Sgt. Charlie Klotchko
- Charles Martin Smith as Joe Friedland
- Eugene Lipinski as Lloyd Manning
- Gina Holden as Claire
- Alex Diakun as Detective Chick Savoy
- Hiro Kanagawa as Fire Captain Roy Komori
- Rob LaBelle as Phil Rosen

== Episodes ==
| No. | Title | Directed by | Written by | Original release date |
|---|---|---|---|---|
| 1 | "Zero to Sixty Pretty Quick" | Nicholas Campbell | Chris Haddock | 25 October 2005 |
| 2 | "Cat in a Tree, Lunatic in the Street" | Charles Martin Smith | Chris Haddock | 1 November 2005 |
| 3 | "Isn't Very Pretty But You Can Smoke It" | Stefan Pleszczynski | Chris Haddock & Jesse McKeown | 8 November 2005 |
| 4 | "One Man Two Jobs" | Charles Martin Smith | Chris Haddock & Jesse McKeown | 15 November 2005 |
| 5 | "Put Down the Hose, Pick Up a Gun" | Stefan Pleszczynski | Chris Haddock | 22 November 2005 |
| 6 | "You Have to Bleed a Little" | Monika Mitchell | Chris Haddock | 29 November 2005 |
| 7 | "Ready to Call in the Horses" | Stephen Surjik | Chris Haddock | 6 December 2005 |
| 8 | "Gonna Cause a Ruckus" | Stuart Margolin | Chris Haddock & Jesse McKeown | 10 January 2006 |
| 9 | "Gotta Press the Flesh" | Charles Martin Smith | Jesse McKeown | 17 January 2006 |
| 10 | "When the Horsemen Come Looking" | Sturla Gunnarsson | Sylvia Leung | 24 January 2006 |
| 11 | "A Few Good Bites Before They Slap Me Down" | David Frazee | Chris Haddock | 31 January 2006 |
| 12 | "Bumped from the Ball" | Sturla Gunnarsson | Jesse McKeown & Sylvia Leung | 7 February 2006 |
| 13 | "The Dogs in Sympathy with the Cats" | Stephen Surjik | Sylvia Leung & Hiro Kanagawa | 28 February 2006 |

== Cancellation ==
With an average weekly audience of just 400,000 viewers, Da Vinci's City Hall lost about half of the former audience for Da Vinci's Inquest. On February 13, 2006, the CBC announced that the show would not be brought back for a second season in 2006, although they also indicated that negotiations were underway to reprise the Da Vinci character in a series of television movies, similar to the manner in which North of 60 continued after its run as a weekly series had ended. The first of those TV movies, The Quality of Life, aired on CBC on June 14, 2008.

The show's final episode was aired on February 28, 2006. The program was repeated on the Canadian channel Showcase during the summer of 2008.

CBC management has been criticized for cancelling the show to make room for other series that have since proved less successful.

== Broadcast in the United States ==
Beginning April 27, 2007, Superstation WGN began airing Da Vinci's City Hall, but it is promoted by American syndicator Program Partners as "Season 8" of Da Vinci's Inquest, even using the same intro as that series (which was used only late into the show's original run) despite the fact that some of the characters seen are not present in the new series.

Nationwide syndication to local stations began in November 2007, also as part of the Da Vinci's Inquest package, with that show's titles.
