= Hamilton's Quest =

- Genre: Drama
- Directed by: Randy Bradshaw; Neill Fearnley
- Starring: John Pyper-Ferguson; Vincent Gale; Don Francks; William Taylor; Tom Heaton; Mike Evans; Jan Alexandra Smith
- Country of origin: Canada
- Original language: English
- No. of episodes: 10

Production
- Production locations: Calgary, Alberta; Drumheller, Alberta
- Cinematography: Ron Orieux; Peter Woeste

Original release
- Network: CTV
- Release: 1986 – 1988

Hamilton's Quest is a Canadian television series that ran from 1986 to 1988.

== Plot ==
A young man discovers, after his parents die in an accident on his 18th birthday, that he was actually not their biological son. The man, Sonny Hamilton (John Pyper-Ferguson), was bewildered by this turn of events and discusses his feelings with Stickman Wilkins, owner of the local pool hall and occasional mystic. Inspired by Stickman's search for roots, Sonny sets off on his own quest for his natural parents.
