= Chris Haddock =

Canadian screenwriter, producer and director

- Born: Vancouver, British Columbia
- Education: Lord Byng Secondary School
- Occupations: Director, writer, producer, and showrunner

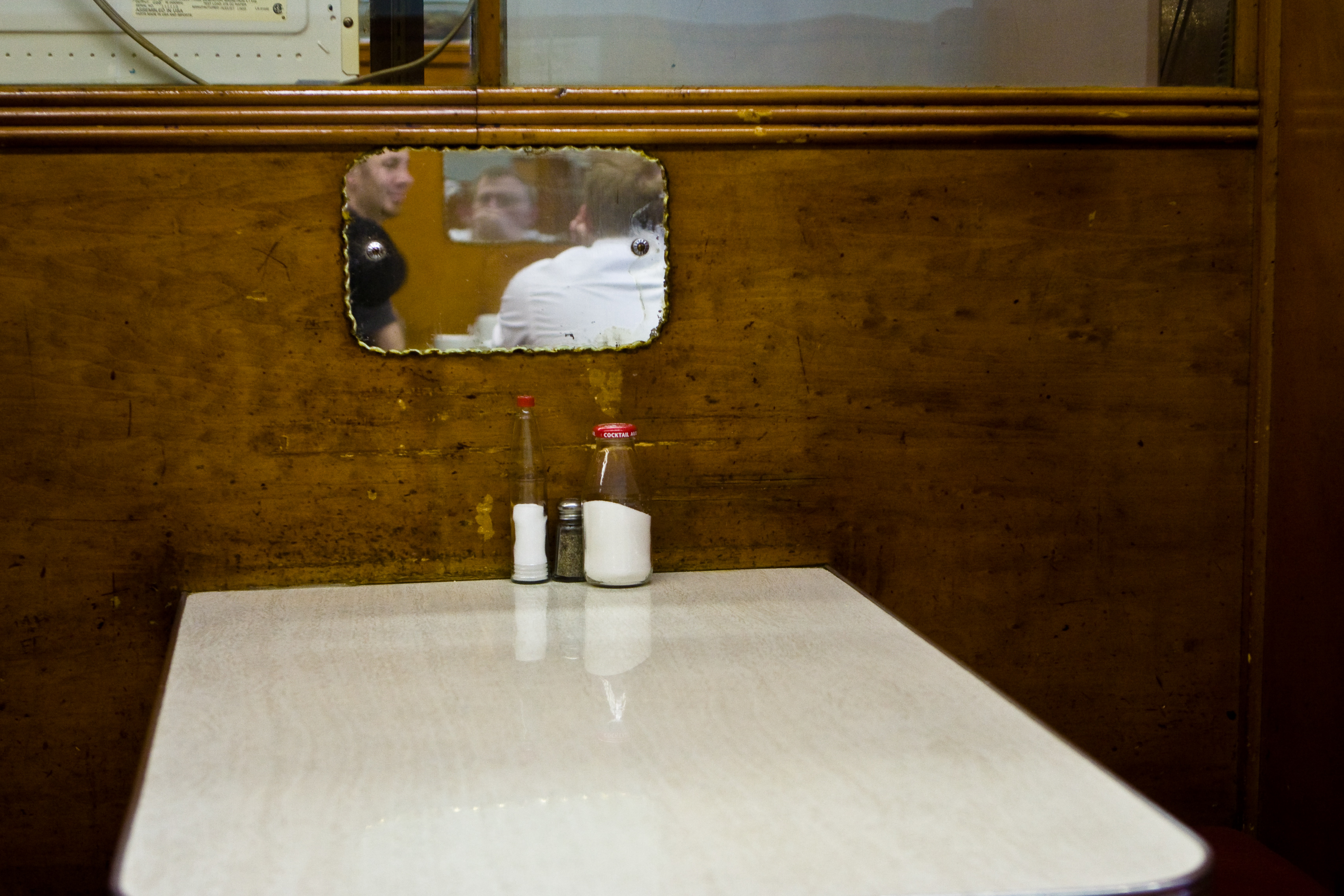
A booth at the Ovaltine Cafe on East Hastings Street, Downtown Eastside, Vancouver, 2008, among those used regularly by characters in Da Vinci’s Inquest.

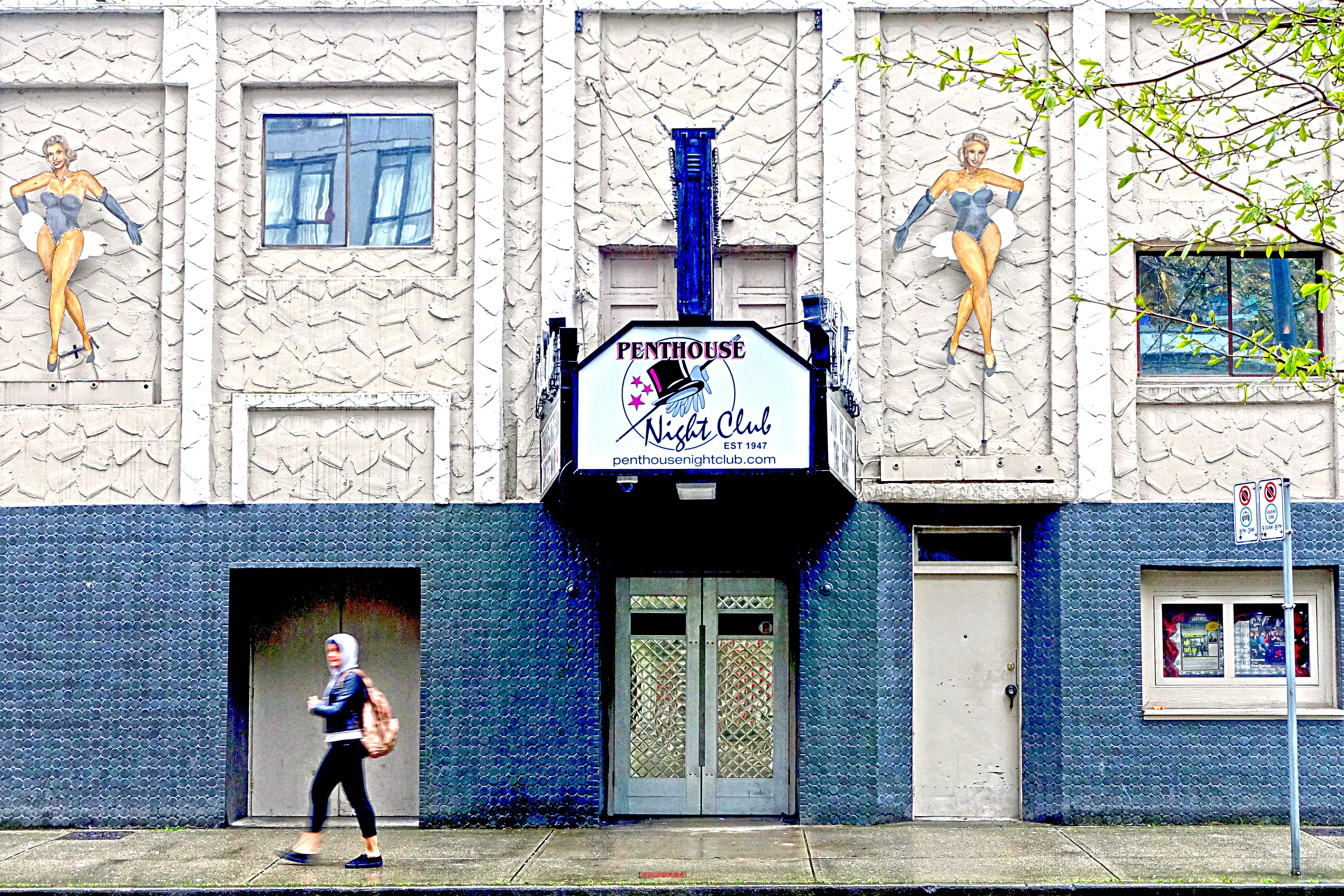
The Penthouse Club (est. 1947) on Seymour Street, Vancouver, 2016, featured as the 'Chick-a-Dee', the headquarters of Jimmy Reardon, in Intelligence.

Chris Haddock is a Canadian screenwriter, producer and director best known as the creator and showrunner of the CBC Television series Da Vinci's Inquest, Da Vinci's City Hall, Intelligence and The Romeo Section. He has won 14 Gemini Awards as a writer, producer and/or director and received another 15 nominations - most of them for Da Vinci's Inquest.

== Career ==
Haddock began as a street performer, but he later focused his creative energies into screenwriting for television. One of his earliest efforts in writing was for the popular series, MacGyver, where he also served as the story editor and executive story editor.

He founded his production company Haddock Entertainment in 1997, and is best known for his Vancouver-based television drama creations Da Vinci's Inquest (1998–2005), Da Vinci's City Hall (2005–2006), Intelligence (2006–2007), and The Romeo Section (2015–2016), which frequently feature notable locations around the city. He also served as writer/co-executive producer on the Martin Scorsese HBO production Boardwalk Empire, and was nominated for a Writers Guild of America award for that show.

Haddock's stage play Helen Lawrence was staged internationally in 2014, including stints at the prestigious Edinburgh International Festival, Toronto's Canadian Stage, Munich and Vancouver.

== Filmography ==
Haddock's creative credits include:

- MacGyver, developed the recurring character Lisa Woodman (played by Mayim Bialik) in 1989
- Da Vinci's Inquest, a CBC series - creator, writer, executive producer
- Da Vinci's City Hall, a CBC series - creator, writer, executive producer
- The Handler, a CBS series - creator, writer, executive producer
- Intelligence, a CBC series - creator, writer, executive producer
- The Life, a CTV television movie - co-writer, executive producer
- The Romeo Section, a CBC series - creator, writer, executive producer
