= Da Vinci's Inquest =

Canadian crime drama series, 1998–2005

- Genre: Crime drama
- Created by: Chris Haddock
- Starring: Nicholas Campbell; Suleka Mathew; Sarah-Jane Redmond; Donnelly Rhodes; Venus Terzo; Camille Sullivan; Ian Tracey; Gwynyth Walsh; Robert Wisden
- Country of origin: Canada
- Original language: English
- No. of seasons: 7
- No. of episodes: 91 (list of episodes)

Production
- Executive producers: Chris Haddock; Laszlo Barna
- Running time: 45 minutes per episode
- Production companies: Canadian Broadcasting Corporation; Haddock Entertainment; Barna-Alper Productions; Alliance Atlantis Productions

Original release
- Network: CBC Television; Syndication (2005–2006)
- Release: October 7, 1998 – January 23, 2005

Related
- Da Vinci's City Hall

Da Vinci's Inquest is a Canadian crime drama television series which originally aired on CBC Television from 1998 to 2005. While never a ratings blockbuster, the critically acclaimed show did attract a loyal following, and ultimately seven seasons of thirteen episodes each were filmed for a total of ninety-one episodes.

The show, set and filmed in Vancouver, starred Nicholas Campbell as Dominic Da Vinci, once an undercover officer for the Royal Canadian Mounted Police, but now a crusading coroner who seeks justice in the cases he investigates. The cast also included Gwynyth Walsh as Da Vinci's ex-wife and chief pathologist Patricia Da Vinci, Donnelly Rhodes as detective Leo Shannon, and Ian Tracey as detective Mick Leary.

A short-lived sequel series Da Vinci's City Hall, ran from 2005 to 2006.

== Episodes ==
Series	Episodes	Originally released	
Series	Episodes	First released	Last released
1	13	7 October 1998	3 February 1999
2	13	6 October 1999	19 January 2000
3	13	4 October 2000	6 February 2001
4	13	30 September 2001	21 January 2002
5	13	27 October 2002	23 February 2003
6	13	23 November 2003	4 April 2004
7	13	12 October 2004	23 January 2005

== Cast ==
=== Main ===
- Nicholas Campbell as Coroner (Mayor in season 8) Dominic Da Vinci
- Suleka Mathew as Dr. Sunita "Sunny" Ramen (credited as "Sue Mathew" in the first season) (seasons 1–5 & beginning of season 6)
- Donnelly Rhodes as Detective Leo Shannon (seasons 1–7)
- Venus Terzo as Detective Angela Kosmo
- Ian Tracey as Detective (Coroner in season 8) Mick Leary
- Gwynyth Walsh as Dr. Patricia Da Vinci (seasons 1–4)
- Robert Wisden as Chief Coroner James Flynn (seasons 1–2 & beginning of 3)
- Sarah-Jane Redmond as Sergeant Sheila Kurtz (seasons 3–7, recurring in seasons 2 and 8)
- Gerard Plunkett as Chief Coroner [formerly Crown Prosecutor] Bob Kelly (seasons 3–7; recurring in seasons 1–2 and 8)
- Kimberly Hawthorne as Detective Rose Williams (credited as "Kim Hawthorne") (seasons 4–7)
- Alex Diakun as Forensics Detective Chick Savoy (seasons 5–8, recurring in 1–4)
- Sarah Strange as Helen (seasons 5–7, recurring in 1–4)
- Simone Bailly as Constable Jan Ferris (season 8)
- Brian Markinson as Police Chief Bill Jacobs (season 8; recurring in seasons 6–7)
- Mylène Dinh-Robic as Rita Mah (season 8)
- Benjamin Ratner as Sam Berger (season 8)
- Hrothgar Mathews as Constable (later Sgt.) Charlie Klotchko (season 8; recurring in seasons 5–7)
- Patrick Gallagher as Internal Affairs Detective Joe Finn (season 8; recurring in season 7)

=== Recurring ===
- Emily Perkins as Sue Lewis (seasons 1–7)
- Stephen E. Miller as Accident Investigation Sgt. Zack McNab (recurring in seasons 1–7)
- Robert Clothier as Joe Da Vinci (season 1)
- Joy Coghill as Portia Da Vinci (seasons 1–5)
- Duncan Fraser as Staff Sgt. Regan (season 1 and beginning of 2)
- Max Martini as Danny Leary (seasons 1–4)
- Jewel Staite as Gabriella Da Vinci (seasons 1, 3–4)
- Peter Williams as Morris Winston (seasons 1–5)
- Warren Takeuchi as Wayne (seasons 1–5)
- Crystal Lowe as Sylvia (seasons 1–3)
- Lee Jay Bamberry as Det. Roy LaBoucane (seasons 2–5)
- Callum Keith Rennie as Detective Bob Marlowe (seasons 2–4)
- Nathaniel De Veaux as Morris Steadman (seasons 2–5)
- Fred Keating as Councillor Jack Pierce (seasons 2–8)
- Terry Chen as William Chen (seasons 3–4, 6–7)
- Dean Marshall as Constable Carter (seasons 4–7)
- Keegan Connor Tracy as Jackie (seasons 4, 7)
- Colin Cunningham as Detective Brian Curtis (seasons 5–8)
- Camille Sullivan as Detective Suki Taylor (seasons 5–7)
- Shaun Johnston as Fire Marshal Sid Fleming (seasons 5, 8)
- Alisen Down as Dr Maria Donato (seasons 6–8)
- Bill Dow as Mayor Russ Hathaway (seasons 6–7)
- Rob LaBelle as Phil Rosen (seasons 6–8)
- Chris Britton as Richard Norton (seasons 7–8)
- Hiro Kanagawa as Fire Captain Roy Komori (season 8)
- Charles Martin Smith as Joe Friedland (season 8)
- Gina Holden as Claire (season 8)
- Rebecca Reichert as Marcie (season 8)
- Eugene Lipinski as Lloyd Manning (season 8)
- Rekha Sharma as Constable Cindy Winters (season 8)

== Production ==
Da Vinci's Inquest was loosely based on the real-life experiences of Larry Campbell, the former chief coroner of Vancouver, British Columbia, who was elected mayor of that city in 2002. The part of Da Vinci, however, was written specifically for actor Nicholas Campbell. Elements of the series' storylines were also taken from sociopolitical issues faced by Vancouver itself, such as the plight of the homeless, the controversy over a designated injection site for drug users, the idea of establishing a red-light district, and the disappearance of homeless women and sex workers — similar to the case of Robert Pickton. Each episode of the series cost $1 million.

=== Format ===
Da Vinci's Inquest is notable for its unconventional story formats. Unlike most crime dramas, many cases on Da Vinci's Inquest aren't fully explained, and some aren't even solved; often the episodes end with the resolution implied or withheld entirely. Some of the show's longer arcs span one or more seasons, but aren't touched on at all for several episodes at a time. An exception to this is Season 7, which features at least three main plots that are addressed in every episode. Two episodes, Season 3's "It's Backwards Day" and Season 4's "Pretend You Didn't See Me," are notable for their extended opening takes, which follow Da Vinci as he walks around a location and speaks with multiple characters in one continuous, ten-minute shot; the former episode is also noted for playing out largely in real time.

Major story arcs include: Da Vinci's attempts to balance his work life with his ex-wife and daughter, as well as his battles with alcoholism; Leo Shannon struggling to care for his mentally ill wife and facing pressure to retire from the force; the relocation of an old mental hospital's cemetery and the intrigue that follows; Sunny overseeing an archaeological dig at a construction site; Angela Kosmo's battle with a corrupt Vice cop and the teenage prostitute who tries to manipulate both of them; and Da Vinci's quest to establish a red light district and safe injection site to protect the sex workers and drug addicts of Vancouver, which leads him to run first for police chief and then mayor. The sex trade is a recurring theme throughout the entire series, and early season premieres and finales center around high numbers of homicides where prostitutes are the victims, which often turn out to be the work of a serial killer. Relationships between characters (such as Da Vinci's many romantic flings and that between Mick Leary and Sunny Ramen) are left in the background of or take place between episodes.

== Availability outside Canada ==
=== United States ===
The original run of Da Vinci's Inquest was always available in certain U.S. markets (e.g., Seattle) where the CBC could be viewed either over the air or on cable. It made its formal U.S. debut, however, the week of September 17, 2005, when it was already in syndication after the original run. The show has continued to air in syndication, along with multiple networks (including Retro TV, Cloo, WGN America, and Court TV Mystery) due to its low-cost syndication arrangement. The series is distributed in the United States by PPI Releasing, a large distributor of Canadian programming to the American market.

=== Other countries ===
In Australia, the series aired late Monday nights on the Nine Network, and its affiliates WIN (although on a different night) and NBN, and later on 13th Street. It has also been aired in late night slots on RTÉ One in Ireland. In Iceland, Skjár einn has aired the show in various slots, including Saturday evening.

== Home media ==
=== DVD ===
Acorn Media UK has released the first three seasons on DVD in Region 1 (US only).

In Canada, Alliance Atlantis released the first season on DVD on 14 October 2003. Season 2 was released on 3 February 2009 by Alliance Films, more than five years after the release of the first season.

DVD name	Ep#	Region 1 (US)	Region 1 (CAN)
Season 1	13	February 27, 2007	October 14, 2003
Season 2	13	November 13, 2007	February 3, 2009
Season 3	13	June 10, 2008	N/A

=== Streaming ===
As of 2017, season one has been released online for free on Canada Media Fund's Encore+ YouTube Channel.

== Awards and nominations ==
Nicholas Campbell received the Gemini Award for Best Performance in a Continuing Leading Dramatic Role for his work on the series and has guest-starred in American shows such as Monk. Donnelly Rhodes also received a Gemini Award for Best Actor in 2002 and the Earle Grey Award in 2006. The series was critically acclaimed as the best television series in Canada after winning the Gemini Award for Best Dramatic Series for five of its first six seasons. In 2002, actress Keegan Connor Tracy won a Leo Award for her guest appearance in Season 4's "Pretend You Didn't See Me" and was brought back for a second appearance in 2005.

== Da Vinci's City Hall and TV movies ==
In Canada, a spin-off series, Da Vinci's City Hall, premiered on 25 October 2005.

In the U.S., Da Vinci's City Hall airs as part of the Da Vinci's Inquest rerun package, regarded as the eighth season of the series (even using the titles from the last three seasons of Inquest instead of the titles for City Hall). City Hall debuted in the U.S. on Superstation WGN on April 27, 2007, and released into national syndication to local stations, also as part of Da Vinci's Inquest, on November 4, 2007.

A TV movie following up on the two series, The Quality of Life, aired on CBC on 14 June 2008.
