= Jack DeLeon =

American actor (1924–2006)

- Born: December 19, 1924; New York City, U.S.
- Died: October 16, 2006 (aged 81); Los Angeles, California, U.S.
- Occupation: Actor

Jack DeLeon (December 19, 1924 – October 16, 2006) was an American actor. He was best known for portraying Marty Morrison, a recurring character on the television detective sitcom Barney Miller, over eight episodes from 1975 to 1982. His character was proudly and overtly homosexual, groundbreaking for network television at the time. In the later episodes he was in a committed relationship with a male partner, which was respected by the detectives in the squad. He also was known for directing and appearing in segments of The Donny & Marie Show.

Between 1969 and 1990 he appeared on such network shows as Get Smart, That Girl, The Paul Lynde Show, CPO Sharkey, The Rookies, Starsky and Hutch, Sanford and Son, Switch, Too Close for Comfort, Archie Bunker’s Place, Laverne & Shirley, The Fall Guy, Night Court, Santa Barbara and Growing Pains. His film credits include Linda Lovelace for President (1975), I Wonder Who's Killing Her Now? (1975), The Choirboys (1977) and Little Miss Marker (1980). He voiced Sergeant Samuel McPherson in the 1977 Dr. Seuss animated television special Halloween Is Grinch Night. He was also the voice of Dwalin in the 1977 animated version of The Hobbit.

His interment was at Mount Sinai Memorial Park in Simi Valley, California.

== Partial filmography ==
- Linda Lovelace for President (1975) – Capt. Neldor
- Kitty Can't Help It (1975) – MacGregor
- Train Ride to Hollywood (1975) – News reporter
- I Wonder Who's Killing Her Now? (1975) – Doctor Binay
- The Hobbit (1977, TV Movie) – Dwalin / Fíli / Kíli / Óin / Glóin / Ori / Nori / Bifur / Bofur / Bert – Troll #2 / Goblin / Orc / Spiders / Wood Elves / Lake People (voice)
- The Choirboys (1977) – Quigley
- Little Miss Marker (1980) – Building Superintendent
- Uphill All the Way (1986) – Sam Osmond
- Valet Girls (1987) – Dirk Zebra
- Violent Zone (1989) – Charles Townsend
- Life Stinks (1991) – Pompous Party Guest
- Temptress (1995) – Brian Carlin
- Allyson Is Watching (1997) – Mr. Merry
