= List of productions at Hollywood Pantages Theatre =

The Hollywood Pantages Theatre, also known as the Pantages, is a premiere live theater venue in Hollywood, Los Angeles, California. Productions at the Pantages have included:

== Pre-1990 ==
- Bubbling Brown Sugar (1977)
- Man of La Mancha (1978)
- Beatlemania (1978)
- La Cage aux Folles (1984–1985)
- Flamenco Puro (1987)

== 1990 ==
- Starlight Express, February 21–April 1
- Peter Pan, June 5–July 1

== 1991 ==
- Les Miserables, January 20-March 10
- Grand Hotel, June 4–July 13
- Man of La Mancha, November 26-December 22

== 1992 ==
- Annie Warbucks, October 27–November 22
- Les Miserables, December 8–January 3, 1993

== 1993 ==
- Joseph and the Amazing Technicolor Dreamcoat, February 16–June 27
- The Will Rogers Follies, July 13–September 26
- Guys and Dolls, November 9-December 12
- Camelot, December 28–January 9, 1994

== 1994 ==
- The Sound of Music, August 9–August 21

== 1995 ==
- Fiddler on the Roof, January 17–January 29
- Joseph and the Amazing Technicolor Dreamcoat, August 8–August 20

== 1996 ==
- How to Succeed in Business Without Really Trying, September 16–September 29
- Damn Yankees, October 22–November 3
- Riverdance, November 15–December 1

== 1997 ==
- Andrew Lloyd Webber–Music of the Night, January 8–January 18
- West Side Story, June 10–June 15
- Cats, September 9–September 14
- Tango x 2, September 16–September 28
- The Phantom of the Opera, October 11–January 31, 1998

== 1998 ==
- Riverdance, April 10–May 3
- The King and I, May 19–May 31
- Peter Pan, July 28–August 9
- The Phantom of the Opera, August 28–November 15

== 1999 ==
- Annie, January 5–January 17
- Cirque Ingenieux, April 27–May 9
- Evita, May 12–May 30
- The Wizard of Oz, June 17–July 4
- Footloose, August 24–September 5
- Jekyll & Hyde, September 7–September 19
- Sunset Boulevard, October 5–October 10
- Defending the Caveman, October 12–October 24
- Fame, November 23–December 5

== 2000 ==
- Buddy: The Buddy Holly Story, February 1–February 13
- The Sound of Music, March 1–March 5
- The Lion King, September 29–January 12, 2003

== 2003 ==
- Cats, April 11–April 20
- The Producers, May 2–January 3, 2004

== 2004 ==
- Chicago, January 7–January 18
- Starlight Express, January 27–February 8
- Mamma Mia!, April 22–June 13
- Miss Saigon, June 16–June 27
- Hairspray, July 20–September 5
- Movin' Out, September 14–October 31
- Peter Pan, November 9–November 21
- Les Misérables, December 2–January 1, 2005

== 2005 ==
- Oklahoma!, January 18–January 30
- Chicago, February 1–February 20
- Evita, March 1–March 13
- The King and I, April 5–April 17
- Wicked, June 17–July 31
- Annie, October 4–October 16
- Irving Berlin's White Christmas, November 22–January 1, 2006

== 2006 ==
- RBD - Live In Hollywood, January 21
- Dragon Tales Live, February 2–February 5
- Riverdance, February 7–February 9
- Doctor Dolittle, February 23–March 5
- Cats, April 11–April 16
- Stomp, May 9–May 21
- Hairspray, May 23–June 4
- Les Misérables, June 6–June 18
- Joseph and the Amazing Technicolor Dreamcoat, June 20–July 2
- Rent, July 18–July 23
- Little Women, August 2–August 13
- Dirty Rotten Scoundrels, August 15–August 27
- Sweet Charity, October 11–October 22
- The Ten Tenors, October 24–November 5
- The Lion King, November 16–January 7, 2007

== 2007 ==
- Wicked, February 10–January 11, 2009

== 2009 ==
- The Phantom of the Opera, January 21–February 21
- Rent, February 26–March 8
- Grease, March 10–March 22
- Rain: A Tribute to the Beatles, March 31–April 5
- Mamma Mia!, April 7–April 19
- Dirty Dancing, May 8–June 28
- Fiddler on the Roof, July 21–August 9
- Legally Blonde, August 12–September 6
- Dr. Seuss' How the Grinch Stole Christmas!, November 10–December 27

== 2010 ==
- Riverdance, January 12–January 24
- Stomp, January 26–February 7
- The Color Purple, February 10–February 28
- Cats, March 9–March 21
- Chicago, April 20–May 2
- A Chorus Line, June 1–June 13
- In the Heights, June 22–July 25
- Young Frankenstein, July 27–September 5
- The Phantom of the Opera, September 23–October 31
- West Side Story, November 30–January 2, 2011

A production of The 101 Dalmatians Musical was canceled in 2010.

== 2011 ==
- Hair, January 5–January 23
- Spring Awakening, February 8–February 13
- The Legend of Zelda 25th Anniversary Symphony
- Rock of Ages, February 15–February 27
- Avenue Q, March 1–March 6
- Beauty and the Beast, March 9–March 26
- Rain: A Tribute to the Beatles, April 12–April 17
- Burn the Floor, April 26–May 8
- Shrek the Musical, July 12–July 31
- Come Fly Away, October 25–November 6
- Riverdance, November 15–November 20
- Wicked, November 30–January 29, 2012

== 2012 ==
- Spamalot, February 28–March 4
- Shatner's World: We Just Live in It, March 10
- Seinfeld Live!, March 16–March 17
- Rock of Ages, March 20–March 25
- Mamma Mia, March 27–April 8
- Billy Elliot the Musical, April 11–May 13
- Chicago, May 15–May 27
- The Addams Family, June 5–June 17
- Million Dollar Quartet, June 19–July 1
- La Cage aux Folles, July 10–July 22
- Memphis, July 31–August 12
- The Book of Mormon, September 5–November 25
- Donnie & Marie: Christmas in Los Angeles, December 4–December 23

== 2013 ==
- Peter Pan, January 15–January 27
- Jekyll & Hyde, February 12–March 3
- Mike Tyson: Undisputed Truth, March 8–March 10
- Catch Me If You Can, March 12–March 24
- Beauty and the Beast, March 26–April 7
- West Side Story, April 9–April 14
- Guts and Glory: An Evening with Anthony Bourdain & Roy Choi, April 16
- Rain: A Tribute to the Beatles, May 7–May 13
- Priscilla, Queen of the Desert, May 28–June 16
- Sister Act, July 9–July 28
- The Wizard of Oz, September 17–October 6
- War Horse, October 8–October 13
- Evita, October 23–November 10
- The Lion King, November 20–January 12, 2014

== 2014 ==
- The Book of Mormon, January 21–February 9
- American Idiot, May 13–May 18
- Joseph and the Amazing Technicolor Dreamcoat, June 3–June 22
- Ghost, June 27–July 13
- Once, July 15–August 10
- Jersey Boys, September 30–October 19
- Pippin, October 21–November 9
- Kinky Boots, November 11–November 30
- Wicked, December 10–March 15, 2015

== 2015 ==
- An Evening With Neil DeGrasse Tyson, February 9
- Alton Brown Live, March 21
- Newsies, March 24–April 19
- Motown, April 28–June 7
- The Phantom of the Opera, June 11–August 2
- Seinfeld Live, October 9–October 10
- Annie, October 13–November 1
- Beauty and the Beast, November 13–November 22
- Riverdance, December 1–December 6
- If/Then, December 8–January 3, 2016

== 2016 ==
- Bullets Over Broadway, January 5–January 24
- Mamma Mia!, January 26–January 31
- Dirty Dancing, February 2–February 21
- The Illusionists, February 23–March 13
- Once, March 15–March 20
- Rain: A Tribute to the Beatles, April 5–April 10
- Kinky Boots, April 13–April 24
- Chicago, April 26–May 1
- 42nd Street, May 31–June 19
- Beautiful: The Carole King Musical, June 22–July 17
- Cabaret, July 19–August 7
- Newsies, August 30–September 4
- Hedwig and the Angry Inch, November 1–November 27
- White Christmas, November 29–December 4
- The King and I, December 13–January 21, 2017

== 2017 ==
- Rent, January 24–January 29
- Motown, January 31–February 12
- Circus 1903, February 14–February 19
- Finding Neverland, February 21–March 12
- An American in Paris, March 22–April 9
- The Bodyguard, May 2–May 21
- The Book of Mormon, May 30–July 9
- Hamilton, August 11–December 30

== 2018 ==
- Aladdin, January 10–March 31
- Love Never Dies, April 4–April 22
- Stomp, April 24–April 29
- School of Rock, May 3–May 27
- The Color Purple, May 29–June 17
- Rogers & Hammerstein's Cinderella, June 19–June 24
- On Your Feet!, July 6–July 29
- Waitress, August 2–August 26
- Beautiful: The Carole King Musical, September 12–September 30
- A Bronx Tale, November 6–November 25
- Wicked, November 28–January 27, 2019

== 2019 ==
- Hello, Dolly!, January 29–February 17
- Kinky Boots, February 19–February 24
- Cats, February 26–March 24
- Charlie and the Chocolate Factory, March 27–April 14
- Fiddler on the Roof, April 16–May 5
- Les Miserables, May 7–June 2
- The Phantom of the Opera, June 6–July 7
- Rent, July 9–July 14
- Miss Saigon, July 16–August 11
- Blue Man Group, September 24–October 6
- Anastasia, October 8–October 27
- Jesus Christ Superstar, October 29–November 3
- Summer: The Donna Summer Musical, November 5–November 24
- Frozen, December 4–February 2, 2020

== 2020 ==
- The Simon & Garfunkel Story, February 21–February 23

== 2021 ==
- Hamilton, August 17–March 20, 2022

== 2022 ==
- Stomp, June 7–June 11
- Moulin Rouge, June 30–September 4
- Jagged Little Pill, September 13–October 2
- Cats, October 4–October 16
- To Kill a Mockingbird, October 25–November 27
- The Book of Mormon, November 29–December 11
- Jesus Christ Superstar, December 26–December 31

== 2023 ==
- Mean Girls, January 4–January 29
- The Lion King, February 2–March 26
- Six, May 9–June 10
- Tina: The Tina Turner Musical, June 13–July 9
- Beetlejuice, July 11–July 30
- Les Misérables, August 1–September 10
- Aladdin, September 12–September 23
- Mamma Mia!, November 14–December 3
- Dr. Seuss' How the Grinch Stole Christmas! The Musical, December 6–December 17
- MJ the Musical, December 20–January 28, 2024

== 2024 ==
- Message in a Bottle, February 6–February 11
- The Wiz, February 13–March 3
- Chicago, March 5–March 24
- Come from Away, May 7–May 12
- Girl from the North Country, May 14–June 2
- Mrs. Doubtfire, June 11–June 30
- Peter Pan, July 9–July 28
- Company, July 30–August 18
- Hamilton, September 4–October 13
- Kimberly Akimbo, October 15–November 3
- Back to the Future: The Musical, November 5–December 1
- Wicked, December 4–February 2, 2025

== 2025 ==
- Harry Potter and the Cursed Child, February 15–June 22
- A Beautiful Noise, July 8–July 27
- Some Like It Hot, July 29–August 17
- Shucked, August 19–September 7
- Les Misérables, October 7–October 19
- Hadestown, October 21–November 2
- Moulin Rouge!, November 4–November 16
- Suffs, November 18–December 7
- Stereophonic, December 9–January 2, 2026

== 2026 ==
- The Notebook, January 6–January 25
- The Book of Mormon, February 3–February 15
- Six, February 18–March 8
- Beetlejuice, March 10–March 22
- Spamalot, March 24–April 12
- Tina: The Tina Turner Musical, April 14–April 19
- MJ the Musical, April 21–May 3
- The Sound of Music, May 5–May 24
- Hell's Kitchen, May 26–June 21
- The Phantom of the Opera, June 24–August 9
- Beauty and the Beast, August 12–September 6
- Water for Elephants, September 8–September 27
- The Outsiders, September 29–October 18
- Bonnie Raitt Live 2026, October 20–October 21
- Bluey's Big Play, October 23–October 25
- The Who's Tommy, October 27–November 15
- Jackson Browne, November 19–November 20
- Elf, December 1–December 13
- The Lion King, December 17–February 13, 2027

== 2027 ==
- Jersey Boys, February 16–February 28
- The Bodyguard, March 2–March 7
- Buena Vista Social Club, March 9–March 28
- Operation Mincemeat, March 30–April 18
- Waitress, April 20–April 25
- The Simon & Garfunkel Story, April 30–May 2
- Maybe Happy Ending, May 4–May 23
- The Great Gatsby, June 1–June 20
- Death Becomes Her, July 6–July 25
- Hamilton, July 28–August 29
