= Fratkin =

Fratkin is a surname. Notable people with this surname include:

- Kaleigh Fratkin (born 1992), Canadian ice hockey player
- Stuart Fratkin (born 1963), American actor
