= Raymond O'Connor (actor) =

American actor (1952–2023)

- O'Connor in 2014
- Born: Raymond John O'Connor; September 13, 1952; South Bronx, New York, U.S.
- Died: October 9, 2023 (aged 71); Newhall, California, U.S.
- Occupation: Actor
- Years active: 1985–2016
- Spouse: Stephanie O’Connor
- Children: 3

Raymond John O'Connor (September 13, 1952 - October 9, 2023) was an American character actor.

== Life and career ==
Raymond John O’Connor was born September 13, 1952, in the Parkchester neighborhood of the borough of South Bronx in New York City, to an Irish Catholic family.

He attended Belmont Abbey College, a Benedictine monastery in North Carolina. He began performing theater in undergraduate school and pursued it more seriously in graduate school in the mid-1970's, eventually working with the First Amendment Comedy group and Medicine Show Theatre, an off-off Broadway experimental troupe.

There he met his wife Stephanie, who he married in 1985. He moved to Los Angeles where Ray continued his acting career. His film and TV resume lists over one hundred productions along with commercial work. His notable film works include: The Rock, Off-Limits, Big Momma's House,My Giant, Life Stinks, My Blue Heaven, Halloween 4: The Return of Michael Myers, Just like Heaven, Inspector Gadget, and many other independent and big budget productions.

In addition to his success as an actor, he was a writer, penning many screenplays, short stories, and poems. A selection of his poetry can be found in the Golden Pen Writers Guild anthologies “This and That (and everything else)” and “The Writer's Brush.”

O'Connor was in a number of films, some small roles and some larger. His first role was in the 1985 mini series Kane & Abel. He made guest appearances on several television shows, such as Seinfeld, Beverly Hills, 90210, Sister, Sister, Silk Stalkings and Babylon 5 (in the 5th-season episode "A View from the Gallery" as Mack).

O'Connor died on October 9, 2023, from bladder cancer.

== Filmography ==
=== Film ===
Year	Title	Role	Notes
1988	Off Limits	Elgin Flowers	
1988	Arthur 2: On the Rocks	Drunk #1	
1988	Traxx	Tibbs	
1988	Halloween 4: The Return of Michael Myers	Security Guard	
1988	Dr. Alien	Drax	
1990	My Blue Heaven	Dino	
1990	Megaville	Taylor	
1991	Life Stinks	Yo	
1991	Pyrates	Fireman	
1993	Mr. Nanny	Frank Olsen	
1995	Prehysteria! 3	Stutts	Direct-to-video
1996	The Rock	Park Ranger Bob	
1998	My Giant	Eddie	
1999	Breakfast of Champions	Rabo Karabekian	
2000	Drowning Mona	Father Tom Stowick	
2003	The Bug in My Ear	Jimmy	
2003	April's Shower	Sgt. Ted Burns	
2004	See This Movie	Manager	
2004	Serial Killing 4 Dummys	Frank	
2004	Bananas	Heston Brother #1	Short
2004	Careful What You Wish For	Sleazy Salesman	Short
2005	Don't Come Knocking	Elko Policeman - Charlie	
2005	Just like Heaven	Catholic Priest	
2006	Love Made Easy	Pellini	
2006	Bottoms Up	Frank Peadman	Direct-to-video
2007	Crazy	Jimmy	
2008	Diamonds and Guns	Mr. Gretano	
2009	The Intervention	Norman Gardy	
2009	Off the Ledge	Richard	
2011	Balls to the Wall	Bernie Niles	
2011	L.A. Noire	Harold Kirby (voice)	Video game
2016	The Usual	Maitre D'	

=== Television ===
Year	Title	Role	Notes
1985	Kane & Abel	New York Newsboy	Episode #1.2 "New York Newsboy"
1986	Hill Street Blues	Nate Mornath	Episode #7.1 "Suitcase"
1987	Hunter	Sooky Barnes	Episode #3.10 "The Cradle Will Rock"
1987	The Wizard	Raymond	Episode #1.17 "The Aztec Dagger"
1987	L.A. Law	Rick Santini	Episode #2.1 "The Lung Goodbye"
1988	J.J. Starbuck	Dickie Rich	Episode #1.15 "Rag Doll"
1989	Hard Time on Planet Earth	Phil Marker	Episode #1.2 "Something to Bank On"
1989	Tales from the Crypt	Jury Foreman	Episode #1.1. "The Man Who Was Death"
1989	Hooperman	Falstead	Episode #2.17 "Love Bytes"
1989	Growing Pains	Manny	Episode #5.11 "Five Grand"
1990	Hollywood Dog	Duane	TV movie
1991	Tagteam	Harrigan	TV movie
1991	Cast a Deadly Spell	Tugwell	TV movie
1991	Northern Exposure	Frank Watson	Episode #3.5 "Jules et Joel"
1991	Who's the Boss?	Burly Man	Episode #8.10 "Field of Screams"
1992	Sisters	I.N.S. Officer	Episode #2.12 "Good Help Is Hard to Find"
1992	Baby Talk	Manager	Episode #2.12 "The Littlest Shoplifter"
1992	Down the Shore	Carl	Episode #1.8 "A House Divided"
1992	Roc	Charlie	Episode #2.10 "Roc and the Actor"; Episode #2.2
1993	Beverly Hills, 90210	Curtis Bray	Episode #3.20 "Parental Guidance Recommended"; Episode #3.22 "The Child Is Father to the Man"; Episode #3.23 "Duke's Bad Boy
1993	Sirens	Security Guard	Episode #1.13 "Friday the 13th"
1993–1994	Phenom	Father Coyle; Father Russell	Answered Prayers (1993); Spring Breakout (1994)
1994	Rebel Highway	Mickey Maven	Episode #1.5 "Girls in Prison"
1994	Girls in Prison	Mickey Maven	TV movie
1994	Diagnosis Murder	Peter Kincaid	Episode #2.3 "Woman Trouble"
1995	Seinfeld	Night Doorman	Episode #6.17 "The Doorman"
1995	Vanishing Son	Artie Gallo	Episode #1.11 "Jersey Girl"
1995	Minor Adjustments	Merchant	Episode #1.6 "The Ex-Files"
1995	Fudge	Dave Katz	Episode #2.14 "The Mouse Trappers"
1995	Sister, Sister	Howard	Episode #3.9 "Thanksgiving in Hawaii: Part 1 Episode 3.10 "Thanksgiving in Hawaii: Part 2"
1996	Wings	Engineer Willy	Episode #7.13 "Sons and Lovers"
1996	Land's End	Carl Granger	Episode #1.15 "Fool's Gold
1996	Hudson Street	Leo	Episode #1.21 "One for the Monet"
1997	Boy Meets World	Officer Dibble	Episode #4.14 "Wheels"
1997	The Steve Harvey Show		Episode #1.14 "African-American Me"
1997	Skeletons	Mr. Muir	TV movie
1997	The Sentinel	Charlie Spring	Episode #2.19 "Private Eyes"
1997	Silk Stalkings	Building Manager	Episode #7.10 "Child's Play"
1997	The Wayans Bros.	Frank Rizzo	Episode #4.8 "I Was En Vogue's Love Slave"
1998	Babylon 5	Mack	Episode #5.4 "A View from the Gallery"
1998	Two of a Kind	Walter	Episode #1.11 "A Very Carrie Christmas"
2000	Brutally Normal	Vice Principal Strauss	Episode #1.2 "Barricade"
2000	Becker	Lenny Sinclair	Episode #2.15 "All the Rage"
2000	V.I.P.	Jerry Goldring	Episode #2.18 "Val's on First"
2000	City of Angels	Hay	Episode #2.2. "Jerque Du Soleil"
2000	The Michael Richards Show	Harvey	Episode #1.7 "USA Toy"
2001	That's Life	Cookie	Episode #1.13 "Heart Problems"
2001	Days of Our Lives	Cab Driver	Episode #1.8985
2001	Dead Last	Charlie Cramachuck	Episode #1.10 "Laughlin It Up"
2001	Buffy the Vampire Slayer	Teeth	Episode #6.9 "Tabula Rasa"
2002	Six Feet Under	Man on Phone	Episode #2.3 "The Plan"
2002	Providence		
2002	Boomtown	Albert Beechem	Episode #1.6 "The Freak"
2003	NYPD Blue	Aldo 'The Dentist' Sanfratello	Episode #10.16 "Nude Awakening"
2003	Audrey's Rain	Minster #1	TV movie
2003	The Handler	Kevin Morris	Episode #1.6 "Dirty White Collar"
2005	Monk	Clemm	Episode #3.10 "Mr. Monk and the Red Herring"
2006	CSI: Crime Scene Investigation	Salesman	Episode #6.14 "Killer"
2006	Malcolm in the Middle	Al	Episode #7.22 "Graduation"
2007	Sands of Oblivion	Dale	TV movie
2007	Saving Grace	Tendell Rusk	Episode #1.5 "Would You Want Me to Tell You?"
2008	Shark Swarm	George Banks	TV movie
2016	The Hub	Mr. Jones	TV movie
