= Ski School 2 =

1994 Canadian film

- Directed by: David Mitchell
- Written by: Jay Naples
- Starring: Dean Cameron; Heather Campbell
- Production company: Active Entertainment
- Distributed by: CFP Distribution
- Release date: February 21, 1994
- Running time: 92 minutes
- Country: Canada
- Language: English
- Budget: $1.5 million

Ski School 2 is a 1994 comedy film directed by David Mitchell and starring Dean Cameron. Its plot concerns a fictional ski school. The first film in the series, Ski School, also starred Cameron and was written by Mitchell.

== Plot ==
Dave Marshak, a former ski champion and section leader of the All Valley Ski School, has been ousted and now lives in a camper. He has three new friends: Alex, a hunk who has a different woman almost every day and is always tired after consummating the affairs: Toddorbert, an eccentric fellow who claims his parents didn't know whether to call him "Todd" or "Bert", so the name stuck; and Tomcat, a bufoonish fellow in the vein of his old pal Ed.

When Dave gets an invite to the wedding of his girlfriend Beth Roberts to Steve Longwood, the new leader of the Ski School, he decides he must go back and try to stop it. The reason is despite his hard-partying ways of the past, Beth was the only one who always kept him grounded. When he arrives, he is immediately threatened by Steve, who warns him not to interfere. Meanwhile, a woman named Lola Schnitzelbank, has arrived on the mountain for an upcoming competition and to continue her passion of nude painting, in which she paints subjects while in the nude.

As Dave makes numerous but futile attempts to convince Beth not to marry Steve, Tomcat makes a shocking discovery. Upon eavesdropping on Steve and his cohort Lee, Tomcat learns that if Steve marries Beth, he will be the new owner of the mountain as it was a deal he had made with Beth's late father. He doesn't love Beth, but wants the mountain all to himself. When Dave learns Steve is going to have his bachelor party, he gets Tomcat to ask Lola to help crash it as a dancer. She agrees on the condition that she can sleep with Alex. Lola surprises Alex that night and the two sleep together.

On the night of the bachelor party, Beth's bachelorette party is crashed by Dave, who poses as the cowboy stripper much to Beth's chagrin turned delight. Meanwhile, Lola becomes the dancer at Steve's bachelor party with Alex and Tomcat hiding in the cake to take photos of the event. When Lola gets Steve hilariously drunk and full of feathers, Tomcat and Alex accidentally reveal themselves and get in trouble.

When Dave and Beth play Battleship and have their first heartwarming conversation since the breakup, Dave still feels a bit of reluctance on commitment, which is why Beth dumped him. However, when the cops brin a drunken Steve, in his boxers and full of feathers, home, Beth realizes Dave set him up and uninvites him to the wedding.

On the day of the wedding, Toddorbert crashes and poses as the ring bearer. Dave, hiding from behind a curtain, like in the Wizard of Oz, reveals Steve's plan to take over the mountain. When Dave is busted, he tells Beth to ask him. When he goes quiet and tries to rebuff, Beth learns the truth when Toddorbert reveals an eviction notice that Lee had left and wasn't supposed to do this until after the wedding. Beth dumps Steve at the altar. A few days later, Dave tries to convince Beth not to jump off the mountain but when she does, it is because she is skiing and Dave catches up to her. The two finally rekindle their relationship with a kiss on the mountain.

== Cast ==
- Dean Cameron as Dave Marshak
- Heather Campbell as Beth Roberts
- Will Sasso as Tomcat Collins
- Bil Dwyer as Toddorbert
- Doug Copithorne as Alex
- Wendy Hamilton as Lola Schnitzelbank
- Brent Sheppard as Steve Longwood

== Production ==
Ski School 2 was credited with being written by Jay Naples, but that name is speculated to be just a pseudonym for director David Mitchell, who wrote the first Ski School film. Indeed, the name Jay Naples does not have any other writing or film credits listed on IMDb.

Filming took place in Vancouver, British Columbia, and on location at Whistler, British Columbia. It was also notable for being the film debut of both Bil Dwyer and Will Sasso. One viewer noted of Sasso, he was "clearly given no direction in some scenes, so you can see him in the background, pulling an insane series of faces while talking to no one."

Reflecting on why he agreed to star in the Ski School series, Dean Cameron recalled: "I wish the movies were more high profile. They offered it to me – and the script had some stuff in it that was subversive for the time. And I said to the producer and the writer, 'This movie is so stupid, we will have a great time making it.' We had a very good time doing that movie."

Stuart Fratkin, who co-starred as Fitz Fitzgerald in the first Ski School, was not asked reprise his role in the sequel because: "they couldn’t afford both Dean and me."

Skiing stunt work was done by Shane Szocs, who in 2006 was named to Powder magazine's list of 48 Skiers Who Shaped Our Sport.

== Release ==
The film was released direct-to-video on February 21, 1994. A DVD was released by Screen Media on December 28, 2004, in pan and scan format.

It's Always Sunny in Philadelphia paid homage to the Ski School series in season 11, episode 3, having Dean Cameron guest star as a burnt-out "party dude" living on the ski slopes.

== Reception ==
The original Ski School has become a cult classic, but the sequel never achieved the same status. One reviewer complains that the antagonist in the sequel falls far short of the original; "That guy was this asshole who did everything perfect and made everyone want to hate him. This one's an anal-retentive moron who looks slightly better than, but is essentially the same person as, Jeremy Piven in Old School." Canuxploitation, noting the lead character's receding hairline, lamented "the characters in this movie are just too old for this. Acting wacky and drinking copiously is excusable for the young 'uns in this genre...but these characters are like unemployed misfits in their late 20s, and the actors themselves are probably in their early 30s. Even the people in Police Academy had jobs!" Chris Hartley sums it up as "The only real reason it exists, I assume, is because the original was a minor hit on home video and this is merely a retread that's only worth it for fans of the first."
