= Owen Bush =

American actor (1921–2001)

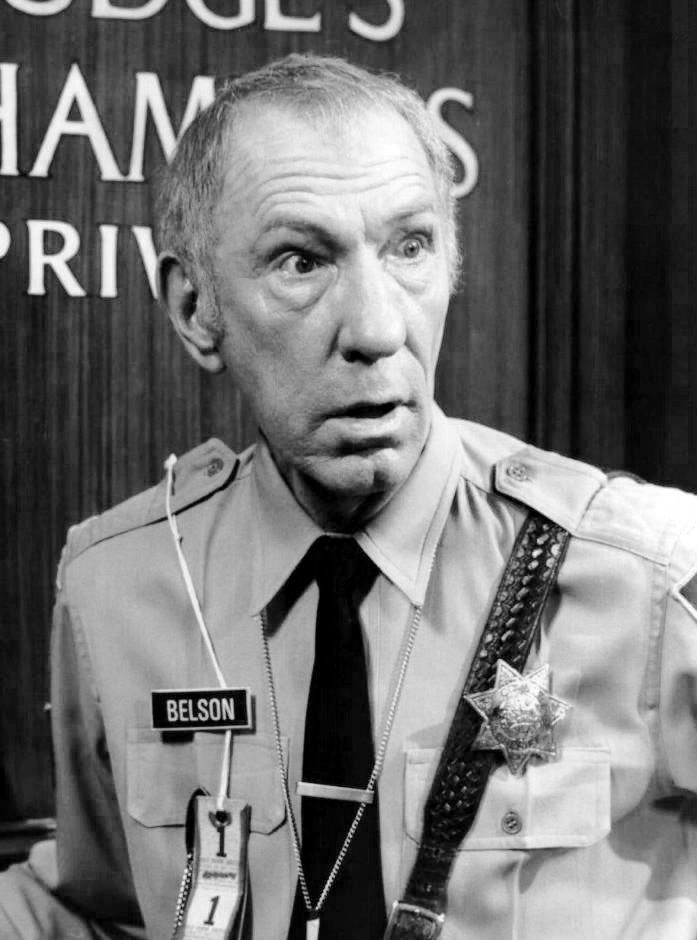
- Bush as Bailiff Belson in Sirota's Court, 1976
- Born: November 10, 1921; Savannah, Missouri, U.S.
- Died: June 12, 2001 (aged 79); Los Angeles, California, U.S.
- Occupation: Actor
- Years active: 1957–2000

Owen Bush (November 10, 1921 – June 12, 2001) was an American actor. Born in Savannah, Missouri, he went on to have a lengthy career in television and film. He portrayed the pivotal character "Benson January" in the season 4 Maverick episode "Bolt From the Blue" written and directed by Robert Altman and starring Roger Moore. His best-known roles were on the soap opera Passions and in the last 2 Prehysteria! films as Mr. Cranston.

== Filmography ==
Year	Title	Role	Notes
1957	The Delinquents	Man in Bar	Uncredited
1960	Ma Barker's Killer Brood	Carney	
1960	Cage of Evil	Sgt. Ray Dean - Records	
1960	Wanted: Dead or Alive	Hosea	Season 2 Episode 20: "The Most Beautiful Woman"
1964	Roustabout	Man	Uncredited
1967	Bonnie and Clyde	Policeman	Uncredited
1967	Valley of the Dolls	Reporter at Suicide	Uncredited
1969	The Reivers	Pete Hyde	
1971	Vanishing Point	Communications Officer	
1971	Skin Game	Guard	Uncredited
1973	The Man Who Loved Cat Dancing	Conductor	
1975	Flash and the Firecat	Vernon	
1975	The Apple Dumpling Gang	Sleeping Fireman	Uncredited
1978	Skateboard	Sign Painter	
1979	Dreamer	The Fan	
1984	The Last Starfighter	Mr. Boone	
1991	Rover Dangerfield	Fisherman #1	Voice
1993	What's Love Got to Do with It	Old Man	
1999	Best Laid Plans	Vagrant	
2000	The Independent	VFW Old Man	
2000	Red Letters	Old Man	(final film role)
