= I Wonder Who's Killing Her Now? =

1975 film by Steven Hilliard Stern

- DVD cover
- Directed by: Steven Hilliard Stern
- Written by: Jerry Cutler; Mickey Rose
- Produced by: Dennis F. Stevens
- Starring: Bob Dishy; Joanna Barnes; Bill Dana; Bobby Ball; Angelo Rossitto; Jack DeLeon; Severn Darden; Vito Scotti
- Cinematography: Richard H. Kline
- Edited by: Duke Goldstone
- Music by: Patrick Williams
- Production companies: Cinema Arts Productions, Inc.
- Release date: 1975
- Running time: 109 minutes
- Country: United States
- Language: English
- Budget: US$80,948

I Wonder Who's Killing Her Now? (original USA theatrical name Kill My Wife, Please) is a 1975 black comedy movie directed by Steven Hilliard Stern, and starring Bob Dishy and Joanna Barnes. Originally Peter Sellers was to be cast as the lead, but insurance refused to cover him after a recent heart attack, and Dishy was cast as his replacement at the last moment. It was directed by Steven Hilliard Stern, from a screenplay by Mickey Rose.

The title is a play on the 1947 musical I Wonder Who's Kissing Her Now.

Soundtrack is Polonaise Op.53 in A flat major (Frédéric Chopin).

== Plot ==
Oliver with two of his assassins

Jordan Oliver (Dishy) is caught embezzling $250,000 from his employer but, as he is the boss' son-in-law, is given a chance to pay it back. Meanwhile, his wealthy wife Clarice (Barnes) is about to divorce him. He can only get the money by having his wife murdered for $1 million life insurance. He hires a hitman Bobo (Bill Dana) to kill his wife; Bobo subcontracts the job out to another hitman, who in turn subcontracts it out and so on until an actor is the hitman for just $6.95. When Oliver is told his wife's insurance is invalid, he must rescue his wife before she's murdered.

== Cast ==
- Bob Dishy
- Joanna Barnes
- Bill Dana
- Severn Darden
- Harvey Jason
- Marjorie Bennett
- Jay Robinson
- Vito Scotti
- George Memmoli
- Jack DeLeon
- Steve Franken
- Richard Libertini

== Home media ==
The movie was released in the US and UK.

== See also ==
- List of American films of 1975
