= Bulldog (The Killing) =

- The Killing episode
- Episode no.: Season 2 Episode 11
- Directed by: Ed Bianchi
- Written by: Jeremy Doner
- Production code: BDH211/S211
- Original air date: June 3, 2012

Guest appearances
- Tom Butler as Mayor Lesley Adams; Colin Lawrence as Benjamin Abani; Don Thompson as Janek Kovarsky; Tyler Johnston as Alexi Giffords; Todd Thomson as FBI Agent; Patti Kim as Roberta Drays; Claudia Ferri as Nicole Jackson; Mark Moses as Lt. Erik Carlson; Brad Kelly as Joseph Nowak

Episode chronology
← Previous "72 Hours"	Next → "Donnie or Marie"
- The Killing (season 2)

"Bulldog" is the twenty-fourth episode of the American television drama series The Killing, and the eleventh of its second season, which aired on the AMC channel in the United States on June 3, 2012. It is written by Jeremy Doner and directed by Ed Bianchi. In the episode, the detectives gain access to the casino's tenth floor, which only causes them to elude the police; and both Stan Larsen (Brent Sexton) and Darren Richmond (Billy Campbell) make decisions that affect their futures.

== Plot ==
Picking up where the last episode finished, Sarah Linden (Mireille Enos) still insists to Stephen Holder (Joel Kinnaman) that they must retrieve the City Hall keycard from the casino's tenth floor. He reminds her that they need a federal search warrant. At City Hall, they ask Gwen Eaton (Kristin Lehman) to obtain a warrant through her senator father. Gwen agrees after Linden insists that any action can change how the city is run. Gwen later asks her father (Alan Dale) to obtain a search warrant for the casino from the attorney general. Senator Eaton points out that casino manager Nicole Jackson is one of his biggest political supporters. Gwen threatens to publicize that he knew Mayor Adams kissed her when she was only 14.

In his office, Mayor Lesley Adams (Tom Butler) watches the online video of Richmond playing basketball. Benjamin Abani (Colin Lawrence) reminds him half of Seattle still thinks Richmond is a killer. He then tells the Mayor that Jamie's ex-girlfriend at the district attorney's office leaked information to the Richmond campaign and that he plans to go speak with her. Mayor Adams visits Richmond at his office, to say he knows about the suicide attempt, and gives him a time limit to withdraw or he will hold a press conference about Richmond's cowardice.

Janek Kovarsky (Don Thompson) and his men, including Alexi Giffords (Tyler Johnston), approach Stan in his garage. Janek sends the men outside and threatens to harm the Larsen family, unless Stan agrees to kill Joseph Nowak for talking to the police. Alexi returns inside in time to overhear Stan reply that he killed Alexi's father for Janek as part of their deal for Stan to leave the mob.

Holder tells Linden the warrant has been secured and they enter the casino with a team of FBI agents. Roberta Drays (Patti Kim) and her security team stand in their way, but Holder gives her the warrant. On the tenth floor of the casino, an FBI agent (Todd Thomson) asks Chief Jackson (Claudia Ferri) for access to security camera footage while Linden orders other agents to tear up the newly installed floor.

Back in Seattle, Richmond tells Jamie Wright (Eric Ladin) and Gwen about his suicide attempt and decides to withdraw from the race. Jamie thinks the news can be used to help the campaign, but Gwen agrees with Richmond, saying that Richmond would still have a political future if he withdrew now.

At the park, Stan asks Terry (Jamie Anne Allman) to take care of the boys should anything happen to him, then leaves without further explanation. He drives to a neighborhood search for Nowak's house. Finding it, he parks a block away and retrieves a gun from the glove compartment.

Drays tells the search team that their warrant expires in ten minutes. After looking beneath the floorboards, Linden and the team leave the room apparently empty-handed. Later, Linden reveals to Holder that she found the keycard, but advises against him submitting it into evidence. In the security room, Drays shows Chief Jackson footage of Linden holding up the keycard and smiling at the security camera in the elevator. Furious, Jackson shoves Drays out of the room and then crushes Drays' fingers in the door as she slams it shut behind her. Jackson then makes a phone call to tell someone the police has their keycard. Mayor Adams hangs up his phone after criticizing someone's promise that "this wouldn't come back" to him. When Lt. Carlson (Mark Moses) enters his office, Adams orders him to arrest Linden in exchange for a possible promotion to police commissioner. Linden and Holder later realize they are being followed by police, and he runs a red light to escape. At the station, an officer informs Lt. Carlson that they lost Linden and Holder but traced her location via her cell phone.

Stan sneaks up as Nowak (Brad Kelly) attempts to start his car but stops when he sees a baby in the back seat. Nowak sees Stan and tries to fight, but is quickly overpowered. Stan tells him that Janek knows and orders him to leave town, threatening to kill Nowak should he return. Elsewhere, Janek gets into his own car, where Alexi is hiding in the backseat. Alexi aims a gun at his head, tells him "this is for my father", and pulls the trigger. Stan later arrives home, where he finds his wife Mitch sitting at the kitchen table.

That night, Richmond begins a campaign rally by thanking his supporters. Outside, Lt. Carlson stops Linden and Holder from entering City Hall but stands aside when Linden reveals the keycard. Richmond silences the crowd by admitting that he tried to kill himself on the night of Rosie's murder. He reassures them that he will never stop fighting for them and exits the stage to scattered applause. The detectives try the keycard at Mayor Adams' main office, but the door remains locked. When they try the keycard at Richmond's main office, the door opens.

== Reception ==
=== Critical reception ===
"Bulldog" received positive reviews. Sean McKenna of TV Fanatic rated the episode 4.8 out of 5 stars, calling it "one of the best episodes of the season", adding, "'Bulldog' was a perfect example of a biting force that gripped on with its story and characters and refused to let go...I've seen plenty of programs waste away their remaining episodes for fluff and utter nonsense. This particular installment did none of that marking pretty much every moment with something rather significant and thoroughly absorbing. And in a way took things we might have predicted and spun them right around." The A.V. Club's Brandon Nowalk rated this episode a B−, saying "If it isn't obvious from all the whiplash, The Killing is racing through this twisty, foggy road to a sudden end, caution to the wind. 'Bulldog' spends a good amount of time building the motivation to get off the couch and solve some crimes." He added that the episode "is such a mess that the only semblance of control comes from the obvious manipulation of every plot point." William Bibbiani of CraveOnline called the episode "strong", adding, "For a political conspiracy series, 'Bulldog' is a pretty great episode of television, a few poorly conceived dramatic beats aside. But it's moved about as far away from its roots as possible by making Rosie Larsen feel unimportant in her own murder investigation. That's a bit of a tragedy, but at least things are picking up and, if you're as frustrated as I am, the season is nearly over."

=== Ratings ===
The episode was watched by 1.67 million viewers and received an adult 18-49 rating of 0.5, marking a return to a normal seasonal ratings average.
