= Ski School (film) =

1991 comedy film directed by Damian Lee

- Directed by: Damian Lee
- Written by: David Mitchell
- Produced by: Damian Lee; Curtis Petersen
- Starring: Dean Cameron; Tom Bresnahan; Stuart Fratkin; Darlene Vogel; Charlie Spradling; Patrick Labyorteaux; Mark Thomas Miller; Ava Fabian; Spencer Rochfort; John Pyper-Ferguson
- Cinematography: Curtis Petersen
- Edited by: Reid Dennison
- Music by: Steve Hunter
- Distributed by: Moviestore Entertainment
- Release date: January 11, 1991
- Running time: 95 minutes (US), 89 minutes elsewhere
- Country: Canada
- Language: English
- Box office: $18,476

Ski School is a 1991 comedy film directed by Damian Lee and starring Dean Cameron. Its plot concerns a fictional ski school. A sequel, Ski School 2, followed in 1994, also starring Cameron.

== Plot ==
At the All Valley Ski School, there has always been a rivalry between two groups. Section 1 is the refined and leaders of the school, led by Reid Janssens with his top cohorts being Derek Stevens and Erich Blor. On the other side, there's Section 8, a ragtag, hard-partying group led by champion Dave Marshak with his cohorts being "Fitz" Fitzgerald and Ed Young. When Montana-based skier John Roland arrives at the school, he hands Reid a letter of recommendation of being accepted into Section 1. However, Reid, feeling somewhat threatened, sends John to Section 8.

During a skiing session, John impresses Section 8, who welcome him with open arms. At a party commemorating an upcoming competition, John meets Lori, a young woman he ran into when he arrived. The two hit it off but Dave comes up with the first of many hilarious pranks against Section 1. He has Lori pretend to flirt with both Derek and Erich while John videotapes the interactions. She invites both to the same hotel room, where with spliced footage from the conversations, make it look like Derek and Erich are sleeping together. When Reid decides to show some footage of his skiing to impress the people on the mountain, the spliced footage is revealed instead and culminates with live footage of Derek and Erich in bed, both screaming in complete horror.

The competition begins and John begins to impress not only Section 8, but many of the local folks watching. As Section 8 continues to party while Section 1 is attempting to keep going on their disciplined ways, Reid's girlfriend Paulette begins to have a crush on Fitz. When she catches Fitz spying on her in the jacuzzi one night, he responds with a slow howl of the moon and she laughs. Meanwhile, rich lady Victoria begins to have eyes on John. The two eventually have sex one night as John and Lori agreed on a no strings attached fling. However, Lori gets jealous when she sees John with Victoria.

Anton Bryce, the current owner of the mountain, has grown tired of Dave and Section 8's mischief as he threatens him with suspension and disqualifications. Bryce is planning to sell the mountain and feels the investors will not exactly approve of Section 8's actions. When one night, Section 8 breaks into Section 1's gym to continue partying, Reid's finally had enough. They start to play dirty in the next round but don't get penalized. When Bryce suspends Marshak and disqualifies Section 8 from the competition, they decide to crash the day of the finals. Meanwhile, John and Lori rekindle their romance and go from a no strings attached fling to falling in love.

Successfully crashing the finals, the locals side with Section 8 with a "Let Them Ski" chant. Bryce relents and reinstates Dave and Section 8 for the competition. At first retaliating for the dirty play Section 1 did the day before, Section 8 eventually ends up in a tie with Section 1. To settle things once and for all, Dave challenges Reid to a race on the Dome, the most dangerous part of the mountain. Dave selects John for the Dome and the loser must leave the mountain. John, learning a lesson from Dave about losing your mind to be the best, jumps off a high cliff to eventually best Reid and win the competition.

Bryce finally sells the mountain and learns there will be "radical restructuring". Dave reveals the new owner of the mountain, who is Victoria. Dave and Reid finally settle their beef after Dave hilariously kisses Reid, who smiles as a result. As everyone starts to party, Fitz and Paulette start their romance. John and Lori still have their romance. Victoria and Dave, the latter breaking the fourth wall, have a toast in a hot tub to end the film.

== Cast ==
- Dean Cameron as Dave Marshak
- Tom Bresnahan as John E. Roland
- Patrick Labyorteaux as Ed Young
- Mark Thomas Miller as Reid Janssens
- Spencer Rochfort as Derek Stevens
- Darlene Vogel as Lori
- Stuart Fratkin as "Fitz" Fitzgerald
- Charlie Spradling as Paulette
- Ava Fabian as Victoria
- Gaetana Korbin as Bridget
- Mark Brandon as Anton Bryce
- John Pyper-Ferguson as Erich Blor
- Johnny Askwith as Bart

== Production ==
Ski School was filmed at ski resorts in Oregon and Whistler, British Columbia. According to Dean Cameron, though, they were able to film on a modest budget because it was shot in the springtime so they "got May rates". Pick-up shots were done in Los Angeles about a year after principal production.

Cameron said in a 2016 interview that the film was sold to producers based solely on its title and a mockup movie poster, before a script was written and before any actors were cast. Cameron said they were given five months to make the movie to secure the financing.

According to Cameron, John was intended to be the lead character until actor Tom Bresnahan was injured while skiing and Dave Marshak was elevated to the lead. Cameron said that he "played Dave Marshak as Bugs Bunny."

According to Cameron and Stuart Fratkin, much of the comedy in the film was improvised or else written by the actors themselves.

Fratkin later wrote that he initially read for the lead role, but lost the job to Cameron. He wrote that he hesitated to accept the offer to play Fitz until his agent secured second billing for him.

The film's soundtrack features two songs by the band Lock Up, a late-1980s musical outfit featuring Tom Morello on guitar, antedating his Rage Against the Machine fame.

== Release ==
The film was released theatrically in the United States on January 11, 1991, although released in Canada the previous year by Cineplex Odeon. Later that year, it was released on videocassette in the United States by HBO Video. In 2007, MGM released the film on DVD. Despite the fact that the back of the DVD says the film is presented in widescreen, it is actually presented in pan and scan.

After its release on home video, Cameron and Fratkin embarked on a promotional tour to pitch the movie to video rental stores.

Homage was paid to the film franchise by It's Always Sunny in Philadelphia in season 11, episode 3, where Dean Cameron makes a cameo appearance as a burnt-out "party dude" living on the ski slopes.

== Reception ==
The film was panned by critics. A review in the Edmonton Journal was headlined "Ski School a wretched lesson in how not to make films." A review in the Montreal Gazette called it "truly abysmal" and a "brain-cell-destroying debacle."
