= Found Footage: The Making of the Patterson Project =

2025 film by Max Tzannes

- Film poster
- Directed by: Max Tzannes
- Written by: David San Miguel; Max Tzannes
- Produced by: Dean Cameron; Tyler Friesen; Dave Hansow; Morgan Hansow
- Starring: Brennan Keel Cook; Chen Tang; Erika Vetter; Dean Cameron; Del Alan Murphy
- Cinematography: Jacob Souza
- Edited by: Jacob Souza
- Production companies: Dirty Shot Clean; Radio Silence
- Distributed by: Vertical
- Release date: 2025
- Running time: 89 minutes
- Country: United States
- Language: English

Found Footage: The Making of the Patterson Project is a 2025 American comedy horror mockumentary film directed by Max Tzannes, and written by Tzannes and David San Miguel. It stars Brennan Keel Cook, Chen Tang, Erika Vetter, Dean Cameron, and Del Alan Murphy.

The story follows a small crew, led by an unexperienced but passionate writer-director, attempting to make The Patterson Project, a low-budget horror film about Bigfoot. The film is presented as found footage, combining takes recorded by the crew for The Patterson Project (itself a found footage film) and material recorded by French documentarians chronicling the film's production. The film's producers include Dean Cameron, who also co-stars as The Patterson Project''s producer.

The film is likened to works such as Christopher Guest comedies (including This Is Spinal Tap) and The Blair Witch Project.

== Cast ==
- Brennan Keel Cook as Chase Bradner, writer and director of The Patterson Project
- Chen Tang as Mitchell Chang, Associate Producer
- Erika Vetter as Natalie Sayers, First Assistant Director and Chase's girlfriend
- Dean Cameron as Frank Eikleberry, executive producer/chief creative financer
- Del Alan Murphy as Pete, a crew member and amateur musician
- Suzanne Ford as Betsy Hannigan, an elderly investor in the film
- Rachel Alig as Danielle Radcliffe, the lead actress
- J.R. Gomez as Elliot
- Deva Holliday as Hannah
- Christian T. Chan as Alan, the actor whose eponymous character is the one holding the camera in The Patterson Project
- Alina Burgos as Tabitha
- Alex G. Smith as Jamie-Lynn Pool, Hair and Makeup Artist
- Marie Paquim as Rochelle
- Chelsea Gilson as Sarah Susan, casting director
- Jaclyn Mofid as Martha, who ends up replacing for the role of Big Foot after the original actor, Kenneth, gets injured

== Production ==
The film was co-produced by Dirty Shot Clean Productions (consisting of Souza, Tzannes, and San Miguel) and Radio Silence Productions (consisting of Matt Bettinelli-Olpin, Tyler Gillett, Justin Martinez, and Chad Villella). It is Tzannes' second feature following Et Tu (2023).

== Release ==
Found Footage: The Making of the Patterson Project premiered with a limited theatrical release in the United States on June 20, 2025, followed by a North American digital release on June 24 and a UK digital release on June 30. The film was distributed by Vertical.

== Reception ==
As of November 17, 2025, the review aggregator website Rotten Tomatoes rates the film at 76% based on 17 critics' reviews.

Travis Hopson of RogerEbert.com rated the film 3 out of 4 stars, praising its horror elements and comedic portrayal of the difficulties in making an independent movie. He states, "it does a good job of capturing the limitations placed on creative ambition by low-budget filmmaking and the mad scrambles that ensue."

Dave Dreher of Gruesome Magazine rated the film 4 out of 5 stars, celebrating its uniqueness, ensemble cast, and absurdity. He writes, "I had a great time viewing this film. I found it inventive and fresh with a perfect blend of laughs and bloodshed."
