= Chen Tang (actor) =

Zhuang American actor

- Born: Chen Ying Tang; July 18, 1988 (age 38); Kobe, Japan
- Occupation: Actor
- Years active: 2008-present

Chinese name
- Simplified Chinese: 唐辰瀛
- Traditional Chinese: 唐辰瀛
Transcriptions
Standard Mandarin
- Hanyu Pinyin: Táng Chényíng
Yue: Cantonese
- Jyutping: Tong4 San4-jing4

Zhuang name
- Zhuang: Dangz Cwnzyingz

Chen Ying Tang, sometimes spelled Chenying Tang and known by his stage name Chen Tang (born July 18, 1988), is an Chinese American actor. He is known for playing Yao in Disney's live-action Mulan (2020) and the hitman Hong in the second and third seasons of the martial arts drama Warrior.

== Life and career ==
Tang was born in Kobe, Japan to parents of Zhuang ethnicity. His parents, both doctors, were among the first generation of students from China to study abroad after the country opened up in the 1980s, and they spent some time in Japan. He spent most of his childhood in Guangxi, China. His grandfather served in the Chinese People's Liberation Army. When he was about six years old, his family emigrated to the United States and settled in Memphis, Tennessee, where his parents worked as medical researchers at St. Jude Children's Research Hospital. He grew up in the suburb of Bartlett, where he picked up a Southern accent. He has said that he did not see his first film until he was eight, and that Bruce Lee was the first person who made him proud to be an Asian man in America.

Tang graduated from Bartlett High School, where he played American football as a tight end and later as an outside linebacker and strong safety. He also studied kung fu, training in Northern and Southern styles for seven years. After high school, he wanted to join the military, but his mother encouraged him to go to college instead. He enrolled as a business major at the University of Miami, where he took an acting class to fulfill a fine arts requirement. After appearing in a school musical, he decided to pursue acting and transferred to Emerson College in Boston.

== Career ==
Tang's first paid acting job was in a Boston stage production of After the Quake, which Inverse described as the city's first production with an Asian-American cast. He later moved to New York City to pursue acting. He made guest and recurring appearances on television series including Being Mary Jane, Grey's Anatomy, Bosch and Agents of S.H.I.E.L.D..

Tang auditioned for Disney's live-action Mulan in early 2018 and was one of the last actors added to the main cast. The role was originally conceived as a tough young soldier who bullied others in the camp, and Tang said that he recognized it at the audition as Yao, one of the title character's fellow recruits. The director Niki Caro encouraged him to make the part his own while drawing on elements of the 1998 animated film. He aimed to portray Yao as a young soldier from the mountains of southern China. Filming took place in New Zealand and ended in December 2018. Tang described working on the film as "one of the great experiences of my life".

In May 2019, Tang was cast as a series regular for the second season of Warrior, a Cinemax drama produced with Bruce Lee Entertainment. He said that the chance to work with Lee's daughter, an executive producer of the series, was a major draw. He played Hong, a "somewhat eccentric but no less deadly hatchet man" sent from China to join the Hop Wei tong in 1870s San Francisco. The character, who is queer, was introduced in the third episode of the season. Tang described Hong as "a very genuinely nice, almost childlike guy" and compared him to "a stray golden retriever". He went directly from filming Mulan in New Zealand to filming Warrior in Cape Town, where he spent eight to ten hours a day with the stunt team.

Tang returned as Hong in the third season, which premiered on Max on June 29, 2023. The season ran until August 17, 2023, and in December 2023 Max cancelled the series, while Netflix acquired non-exclusive rights to its three seasons.

In 2025, Tang appeared in Found Footage: The Making of the Patterson Project, a mockumentary horror film directed by Max Tzannes, as Mitchell, the best friend and associate producer of a young filmmaker making a found-footage film about Bigfoot. Film Threat described Tang and his co-star Erika Vetter as "great sympathetic foils" to the lead character.

== Personal life ==
Tang has supported the Cambodian Children's Fund, which educates children in Phnom Penh, and he donates part of his monthly earnings to St. Jude Children's Research Hospital and other charities. Speaking about masculinity, he said that it "means wanting to take care of people around you".

== Filmography ==
Film roles
Year	Title	Role	Notes
2008	Tumbler	Charles Jenkins	Short film
2013	Polypore	Paul	
2013	Reunion 108	Moon Ki Lee	
2014	Let's Be Cops	The Real Chang	
2014	The Cocks of the Walk	Coach Hawk	
2015	The Wind Outside	Li	Short film
2015	The Company Man	Li Cheung	Short film
2015	When Mom Visits	Nick	Short film
2017	Finding Tomorrow	Teddy	Short film
2017	The Jade Pendant	Joe Lee	
2018	Escape Plan 2: Hades	Yusheng Ma	
2018	Brian Banks	Reporter	
2018	Rift	Chris	
2020	Mulan	Yao	
2025	Found Footage: The Making of the Patterson Project	Mitchell	

Television roles
Year	Title	Role	Notes
2011	30 Rock	Jake Hu	Episode: "I Heart Connecticut"
2011	Wicked Attraction	Phillipe Zamora	Episode: "Bad Fortune"
2011	Celebrity Ghost Stories	Eric Zee	Episode: "Keshia Knight Pulliam, Ming-Na, Chi McBride, Mia Tyler"
2012	Delocated	Hui-zhong	3 episodes
2012	Mythos	Shiva	3 episodes
2012	Steel Wulf: Cyber Ninja	Colloso	Main cast
2013	Dates from Hell	Chuck	Episode: "Blood Red Carpet"
2015	Last Life	The Adversary / Frat Guy	Episode: "Everyone's Got a Theory"
2015	Being Mary Jane	Yong-Jin	2 episodes
2016	Fresh Off the Boat	Male Model Eddie	Episode: "Breaking Chains"
2016	The Thundermans	Anchorman	2 episodes
2017	Rosewood	Bradley Morgan	Episode: "Clavicle Trauma & Closure"
2017	Grey's Anatomy	Dave	Episode: "In the Air Tonight"
2018	Bosch	Ken Lin	2 episodes
2018	Agents of S.H.I.E.L.D.	Agent Kim	2 episodes
2020	Warrior	Hong	Main cast (Season 2)
