= A Dog's Best Friend =

1959 film

- Theatrical release poster
- Directed by: Edward L. Cahn
- Screenplay by: Orville H. Hampton
- Produced by: Robert E. Kent
- Starring: Bill Williams; Marcia Henderson; Roger Mobley; Roy Engel; Charles Cooper; Harry Dean Stanton
- Cinematography: Kenneth Peach
- Edited by: Michael Minth; Grant Whytock
- Music by: Paul Sawtell; Bert Shefter
- Production company: Premium Pictures Inc.
- Distributed by: United Artists
- Release date: December 20, 1959
- Running time: 70 minutes
- Country: United States
- Language: English

A Dog's Best Friend is a 1959 American Drama Western film directed by Edward L. Cahn and written by Orville H. Hampton. The film stars Bill Williams, Marcia Henderson, Roger Mobley, Roy Engel, Charles Cooper and Harry Dean Stanton. The film was released on December 20, 1959, by United Artists.

== Plot ==
Orphaned when his widowed father is executed for murder, Pip Wheeler is sent to live with rancher Wes Thurman and his wife Millie. The young boy's traumatic past makes him so withdrawn and difficult that the Thurmans consider returning him to the orphanage. Unknown to his foster parents, Pip finds a stray, hungry German shepherd, Silver King, guarding a .38 revolver one day and nurses the animal back to health and sneaks food from the Thurman house to feed him. Hiding the dog in the hills, Pip gradually gains the animal's trust, resulting in a softening of the boy's demeanor, which surprises the Thurmans, who know nothing of the blossoming friendship. Meanwhile, the shepherd's owner, miser Otto Tillman, who was rumored to keep a large amount of cash in his house, has been found murdered and Silver King is missing. Evidence at the scene of the crime leads officials to believe that Silver King, a war dog trained by the Marines, wounded the assailant during the murder, thus prompting Sheriff Dan Murdock to call for the dog to be found and shot. Meanwhile, the murderer, Roy Janney, lies suffering from gangrene in a motel with his partner in the crime, Deputy Sheriff Bill Beamer. Unable to seek medical attention for fear that Janney might be identified because of the dog bites, Beamer promises that they can leave town with the money once he finds the dog and the revolver that the animal snatched during their scuffle. Meanwhile, Wes, discovering that a dog has killed one of his lambs, tracks down Silver King and finds Pip with the gun drawn, guarding him. After Pip insists he would rather run away than give up the dog, Wes, convinced that Pip must go back to the county authorities, reports the incident at the police station. Beamer, who is also at the station, learns of Silver King's whereabouts and assumes he can finally recover his gun and dispose of the animal, thus destroying all the incriminating evidence. Soon after, following a lead about a man found dying in a nearby motel, Murdock and Wes go to the motel and discover Janney and the stolen money. When Janney confesses to killing Otto and names Beamer as his accomplice, Murdock and Wes deduce that Beamer will be hunting down Pip to destroy the gun and kill him and Silver King. Meanwhile, Beamer finds Pip in the hills, gets the gun and attempts to shoot the boy, but the dog leaps into the battle and saves Pip. When Wes and Murdock arrive at the scene, Beamer shoots and wounds Murdock but is knocked unconscious by Wes in the ensuing fight. Witnessing Wes's love for him, Pip happily returns to the Thurman house, where both he and Silver King accept their new, permanent home.

== Cast ==
- Bill Williams as Wesley 'Wes' Thurman
- Marcia Henderson as Millie Thurman
- Roger Mobley as Pip Wheeler
- Roy Engel as Sheriff Dan Murdock
- Charles Cooper as Deputy Sheriff Bill Beamer
- Dean Stanton as Roy Janney
- Jimmy Baird as Jimmy Thurman
- Terry Ann Ross as Amy Thurman
