= They Came from Outer Space =

Television series

- Genre: Science fiction Teen sitcom
- Created by: Tom McLoughlin
- Written by: Peter I. Baloff; Tom McLoughlin; Dave Wollert
- Directed by: Chuck Bowman; Sidney Hayers; Jefferson Kibbee
- Starring: Dean Cameron; Stuart Fratkin
- Theme music composer: Marie Cain; Gary Stockdale
- Opening theme: "They Came from Outer Space"
- Composer: Gary Stockdale
- Country of origin: United States
- Original language: English
- No. of seasons: 1
- No. of episodes: 20

Production
- Executive producers: Bill Finnegan; Patricia Finnegan; Sheldon Pinchuk
- Producer: Lori-Etta Taub
- Cinematography: Clinton Dougherty; Michael Hofstein
- Editor: Skip Robinson
- Camera setup: Single-camera
- Running time: 45–48 minutes
- Production companies: The Finnegan-Pinchuk Company; MCA Television Entertainment

Original release
- Network: Syndication
- Release: October 1, 1990 – March 19, 1991

They Came from Outer Space is an American science fiction teen sitcom that aired in syndication from October 1990 to March 1991. The series was created by Tom McLoughlin and was produced by Bill Finnegan, Patricia Finnegan, and Sheldon Pinchuk through their production company Finnegan-Pinchuk in association with MCA Television Entertainment (MTE).

== Synopsis ==
The series stars Dean Cameron as Bo, and Stuart Fratkin as Abe, two teenage fraternal twin aliens from the planet Crouton. They thwart their parents' plans to send them to Cambridge University, in Great Britain, and instead they decide to travel throughout California in their 1959 classic red Chevrolet Corvette, in an effort to pick up women and to learn more about life on Earth. They are pursued by a pair of bumbling U.S. Air Force officers, Lt Col. Tom Barker, and Lt. Pat "Monkey" Wilson, who would like to capture the two for scientific study. Abe and Bo were constantly taking odd jobs to support themselves on their American road trip.

== Characters ==
Abewosiak "Abe" (Stuart Fratkin) was the more responsible, and serious, of the two brothers. Much is made about the fact that Abe is still a virgin, and wishes to remain so until he is married. His primary concern throughout the series seems to be where their next meal will come from. He frequently complains that he is hungry. However, due to his high Croutonian metabolism he can eat large quantities of food and never gain weight.

Boximaxio "Bo" (Dean Cameron) was the more fun loving of the brothers. His primary interest seemed to be how many women he could get to have sex with him. He seldom thinks about the consequences of his actions and usually gets Abe and himself into trouble. It was his idea to go to California (instead of Britain) when he read that his favorite centerfold lived in Malibu. He would wrestle control of the space ship from Abe and crash inside a California junk yard.

Lt Col. Tom Barker (Alan Royal) was an Air Force officer charged with tracking down any extraterrestrial on Earth and turning them over to be dissected. He was resentful of the fact that he was working in the UFO hunter unit, because he believed that it was beneath someone of his rank to be doing the job. It is implied that he was put in the unit as punishment for embarrassing a senior officer. Barker believes that if he catches the brothers he will be transferred out of the unit and possibly made a general.

Before the start of the series, he caught a pair of Croutonian sisters, the Patoolas, on which the government experimented. This is presumably how he knew about Crouton physiology and abilities. Abe and Bo knew about the capture of the sisters and it was one of the reasons Abe did not want to come to the United States.

Lt. Pat "Monkey" Wilson (Christopher Carroll) was the other Air Force officer hunting aliens on the team. Wilson most likely was demoted from a higher rank down to lieutenant, when he was put into the unit. He got the nickname "Monkey", due to an embarrassing story that he was reluctant to share. The Colonel generally referred to him only as Wilson, but would call him Monkey when he wanted to put him down.

Throughout the series neither officer managed to capture the Crouton brothers. This was due to their own incompetence, and the brothers using their various abilities to outwit them.

Mom and Dad (Rosalee Mayeux and Victor Brandt) were Bo and Abe's parents back on the planet Crouton. When they crash landed on Earth, the twins saved their galactic communication device. This enabled them to communicate, in real time, with audio and video with their parents back on the planet Crouton. A couple of episodes ended with the brothers telling their parents how things were going in "England". To complete the illusion, they would often place a poster in back of them showing familiar British landmarks, such as Big Ben, Oxford University, or Tower Bridge, while playing "Rule Britannia" in the background. However, they were once almost found out when their father noticed that the Hands of Big Ben had not moved in the several minutes that they were talking.

== Crouton physiology ==
The only Croutonians shown during the season were the two brothers and video conferences they had with their parents. Most of what is known about them comes from what they have said. Considering the Air Force's knowledge about some of the Croutonian abilities, we can also assume that they learned some of this from the captured sisters that they had experimented on.

=== Basic physiology ===
Croutonians outwardly look like normal humans. Of the four seen in the series, they all appeared to be Caucasian. It is not known if they have other racial types on their home planet.

Despite their outward appearances they have several unique powers and abilities that distinguish them from humans. These special powers use a lot of energy, which gives them an extraordinarily high metabolism. A running gag in the series was how the two of them would eat an extremely large quantity of food often surprising or disgusting the humans around them. It was not uncommon for them to literally eat an all-you-can-eat buffet out of all their food. Each one of them could easily eat a whole large pizza pie and still be hungry afterwards.

Croutonians also appear to be able to eat as foods things that are toxic to humans. In one incident they made a type of "Crouton cocktail". The ingredients included mouthwash, liquid shoe polish and window cleaner fluid.

Another unique thing about all Croutonians is that they all are apparently born fraternal twins. Throughout their lives the twins share an empathic bond, that enables them to each feel what is happening to the other, but not themselves. For example, if you were to slap Bo, he would feel nothing, but Abe would feel pain and vice versa. If you were to tickle Abe he would not react, but Bo would laugh. This often lead to some farcical elements involving the brothers. Even though they shared empathic abilities they apparently could not read each other's thoughts. Though they were linked it appears as though when they were hungry they felt it themselves, as Abe would often say "I'm hungry", instead of "Bo, you're hungry."

Another common running gag involved what happened to Croutonians when sexually aroused. Their bodies would make a sound like boiling water while giving off a thick white steam-like substance. This would often lead people to falsely assume that the Croutonians were in fact on fire, and splash cold water on the "smoking" brother. Due to their empathic link, it would cool off the other brother. Bo preferred to explain it as there was low rolling fog coming in. It is never explained if this is common in both genders or only male Croutonians.

=== Crouton powers ===
The Croutonians have several unique powers that are seen throughout the series. The following is a list of powers that Bo and Abe exhibited. Apparently, these powers are shared by all Croutonains.

Object Transference

Object transference was the most frequently used of their special powers. This ability enabled the brothers to instantaneously teleport any inanimate object across the room. This was done by the brothers linking each of their arms at the elbow, then with their free hand pointing at the object they would want to move. For example, Bo would point at the object and Abe would point where they would want the object to transfer to or vice versa. Then they would say the phrase "Boing" and the object would disappear from where Bo was pointing and appear where Abe was pointing.

The brothers had to agree which object was going to be transferred and which brother was going to point. Neither could use this power without his brother. In the course of the series they would transfer objects like food and bottles across the room. On one occasion they were able to transfer electricity from an electrical outlet to a light bulb just by using object transference.

Inanimate Projection

This ability enables a Croutonian to temporarily place their consciousness into an inanimate object for a short period of time. All they had to do was will it and their body would disappear as they would now be inside the object that they wanted. Throughout the show's run they appeared inside objects ranging from fuzzy dice to toy robots. Mobile objects such as vehicles or electronic objects such as televisions could be controlled by Croutons projected into them. A Croutonian can only stay inside an object for approximately one minute or else they might get stuck in the object for several hours. Bo once got stuck inside a massage table, an experience he quite enjoyed, but it left Abe feeling stiff.

Animal communication

This power gave them the ability to tune into another species' "frequency" in order to communicate with them using some form of telepathy. What they would do is hold one hand up to or above the animal, with their palm facing the animal. Occasionally, with their free hand they would use their fingers to tune into the animals thoughts, by moving their hand as if there was a knob near their ear. Once they found the correct frequency they could understand and communicate with that particular animal. Although a Crouton could hear the animals' thoughts, those around him (including his brother) understood nothing. Some of the animals they communicated with include: dogs, a horse, birds, fish, and on one occasion a gorilla who could do John Wayne impersonations.

Energy transference

This ability allows one Croutonian to transfer some of his energy into another Croutonian. To do this they first must clasp both of their hands while facing each other. Then one can pass his energy into the other. The effect on the one receiving the energy is that he is able to move almost at twice his normal speed, and have extremely quick reflexes. The other one will move in an exaggerated slowness and with extremely slow reflexes. It is not explained if the Croutonians must be related to use this ability or if they can transfer energy to anyone from Crouton.

== Production notes ==
=== Theme song ===
The lyrics of the show's theme song were written by Gary Stockdale with Marie Cain, and performed by Stockdale, Cain, Terry Wood, and Michael Now.

== Episodes ==
No.	Title	Directed by	Written by	Original release date
1	"Malibu or Bust!"	Sidney Hayers	Story by : Tom McLoughin; Teleplay by : Tom McLoughlin & Peter Baloff & Dave Wollert	October 9, 1990
Bo and Abe crash in Malibu, California, instead of going to Oxford like their parents wanted. In the premiere episode the boys use object transference to build their Corvette from parts found inside the junkyard where they crash. They then team up with a beautiful blond on the run from two thugs.
2	"Undress for Success"	Chuck Bowman	Tony Reitano	October 16, 1990
The brothers try to get a job in a topless bar. They are disappointed when they realize that it is a male bar. There they befriend the "Legal Eagle", a law student paying for his school by stripping. Due to a series of events the brothers end up stripping to the disappointment of the fans of the club. One woman screams "We want Beefcake, not Twinkies!"
3	"The Beauty Contest"	Bruce Bilson	Peter Baloff & Dave Wollert	October 23, 1990
Abe and Bo find themselves in the town of Miranda, California, where they are drafted to judge a beauty contest. However the citizens of Miranda take the contest quite seriously, and if they feel the wrong contestant won, they kill the judges. A gag in this episode is that the major contestants' names all rhyme. They are Holly, Molly, Polly, and Dolly.
4	"Something Personal"	Dennis Donnelly	Peter Baloff & Dave Wollert	October 30, 1990
In an attempt to get Abe to finally lose his virginity, Bo convinces him to answer personal ads. Unfortunately this backfires as Abe meets one strange woman after another. They include a woman obsessed with cockatiels, a sadistic Air Force sergeant, and a psychotic woman who wants to avenge the world against the one man who did her wrong.
5	"School Fools"	Sidney Hayers	Peter Baloff & Dave Wollert	November 6, 1990
When the boys' parents want to see their report cards from Oxford, they realize they might be in trouble as they are not even in England. The brothers decide to go to another school called Oxford and hope they can fool their parents. However, the only Oxford they can find in California is a newly integrated women's college. The women at the school take out their frustration on the first new male students out on Bo and Abe.: Note: this is the only episode where energy transference is used.
6	"Tennessee Lacey"	Chuck Bowman	Dan Levine & Peter Baloff	November 13, 1990
Col. Barker hires sexy bounty hunter, Lasey, to capture the boys. However her sister and rival Tracey kidnaps them and hits on the idea to marry one of them. Of course the brothers eventually escape from all of this.
7	"Trading Faces"	Sidney Hayers	Tracy Newman & Jonathan Stark	November 20, 1990
While trying to meet his favorite rock star, Bo instead meets his wealthy doppelganger, a human named Max Travis. The only difference between Bo and Max (both played by Dean Cameron) is that Max had a Harvard accent. It turns out Max is in fact about to go to prison and has plans for Bo.
8	"Rodeo Romeos"	Sidney Hayers	Paul Chitlik & Jeremy Bertrand Finch	November 27, 1990
Bo's bad tooth is causing Abe a lot of pain. So they stop in a small town to his tooth pulled. There they fall for the two beautiful dental assistants, and get involved in trying to help save their uncle's ranch. The boys do this by entering a bull-riding contest and using the money to help keep the evil banker from foreclosing on the ranch.
9	"Mr. Geek"	Chuck Bowman	Bucky Hernandez & Peter Baloff	December 4, 1990
The boys help a professional wrestler known as "Mr. Geek", win the heart of a beautiful woman and defeat a fearsome masked wrestler called "The Executioner". At one point Bo and Abe fight The Executioner, which confuses him due to their Croutonian empathy. He would punch Bo who would feel no effect while Abe would be in pain and vice versa.
10	"The Legend"	Jefferson Kibbee	Peter Baloff & Dave Wollert	January 7, 1991
Due to a freak accident, Abe thinks he is 1950s rock star, Arlen "The King" Fraiser. Fraiser is an obvious parody of Elvis Presley. Abe/Arlen then insists that Bo take him to Las Vegas because he has a gig. Bo takes him hoping that Abe will eventually remember who he really is. While in Vegas, the boys come to the aid of a young woman, who owes a loan shark a lot of money to erase her debt. This is the only episode where Bo and Abe leave the state of California.
11	"Ads "R" Us"	Chuck Bowman	Peter Baloff & Dave Wollert	January 14, 1991
The owner of toy company hires the twins to help design his next ad campaign. The previous executive who was in charge of the account was not pleased. When he figures out they are aliens he plans to turn them over to the Air Force. However Bo and Abe get the campaign done anyway.
12	"Animal Magnetism"	Dennis Donnelly	Antoinette Stella & Thomas Sheeter	January 21, 1991
A parody of One Flew Over the Cuckoo's Nest. In an attempt to keep out of jail the boys pretend they're insane. Unfortunately, they get committed to a state mental hospital with a "Nurse Ratched" like woman running the place. She gives truth serum to Bo, which forces Abe to tell all about who they really are. Guest stars Eva La Rue and Ruth Buzzi.
13	"High Five"	Gary Walkow	Story by : Jonathon Torp & Tom Chapman & Peter Baloff & Dave Wollert; Teleplay by : Jeffrey Peter Bates & Peter Baloff & Dave Wollert	January 28, 1991
Bo and Abe take over a failing Public-access television cable TV station and boost its ratings. The competition takes note and tries to sabotage their station. This episode features a Who's the Boss parody, including a character clearly inspired by the alleged problems on the set involving Tony Danza.
14	"Cozy Cove"	Dennis Donnelly	Story by : Peg Mohone & Jack Shapiro & Peter Baloff & Dave Wollert; Teleplay by : Peter Baloff & Dave Wollert	February 4, 1991
Abe and Bo go searching for buried treasure. They believe it is in the cellar of an exclusive country club, so they get jobs working there as waiters.
15	"Look Who's Barking"	Jefferson Kibbee	Story by : Howard Friedlander & Ken Peragine & Peter Baloff & Dave Wollert; Teleplay by : Peter Baloff & Dave Wollert	February 11, 1991
Bo and Abe try and save a movie star dog, Oscar, from his owner who wishes to put him to sleep to collect the insurance. The brothers rescue the dog after he tells them this, and try and reunite him with his mother.
16	"Hair Today, Gone Tomorrow"	Chuck Bowman	Story by : Frank Dandridge & Peter Baloff & Dave Wollert; Teleplay by : Peter Baloff & Dave Wollert	February 19, 1991
The twins get a job working in a hair salon where Bo becomes a celebrity stylist. Unfortunately, this affects the owner's embezzlement plot. Guest stars Halle Berry and Bobbie Phillips.
17	"Play Doctor"	Dennis Donnelly	Story by : Stephen Lord & Peter Baloff & Dave Wollert; Teleplay by : Peter Baloff & Dave Wollert	February 26, 1991
Bo and Abe are mistaken for a pair of diet experts. Then they help a scientist prove that her work has been stolen and plagiarized by a charlatan.
18	"Double Jeopardy"	Gary Walkow	Story by : Geoff Gilbert & Gregg Sherman & Peter Baloff & Dave Wollert; Teleplay by : Peter Baloff & Dave Wollert	March 5, 1991
In need of money Bo convinces Abe to become private investigators and they open up the Snoop Brother Detective Agency. Bo, a huge fan of hard boiled film noir, was hoping to solve cases and meet beautiful heiresses. They become involved in helping solve a jewelry heist at a rich couple's home. Their problem is did the beautiful woman set them up to be her patsys? Only if they solve the case can they clear their good name.
19	"Sex, Lies and UFOs: Part 1"	Dennis Donnelly	Peter Baloff & Dave Wollert	March 12, 1991
Bo and Abe decide they need to spend some relaxing time up in the woods. Their plans are interrupted when they meet a race of beautiful alien women who want to mate with humans. After they mate with forest ranger, Bo witnesses him turn green and shortly afterwards evaporate leaving behind nothing but a pile of green powder and his hat. Bo then tries to prevent Abe from mating while avoiding the advance of one of the aliens. So their commander zaps Bo with a device that should have made him fall in love with the first person he sees, but due to their empathic link Abe falls instead for the alien Shneka.
20	"Sex, Lies and UFOs: Part 2"	Dennis Donnelly	Peter Baloff & Dave Wollert	March 19, 1991
Bo must both escape from Col. Barker and Lt. Wilson and stop Abe from marrying Shneka. After he accomplish this he and Abe try and save the world from the invading alien women. In an effort to decide if Earth men are compatible for reproduction, the invaders go to the "Sex Kitten Grotto" to seduce several men that are there attending a party. Some of the men they seduce include a boxing champion, a famous actor, and for some reason the lawn jockey. The Sex Kitten is a parody of Playboy magazine and the house where the party takes place is a parody of the Playboy Mansion. John Astin guest stars as Neville "Ness" Nessen a spoof of Hugh Hefner. Astin plays Ness as a man fed up with the constant partying life but not knowing how to give it up as it is a part of his image and sells magazines.

== Home media ==
On February 14, 2012, Timeless Media Group (under license from Universal Studios Home Entertainment) released They Came from Outer Space- The Complete Television Series on DVD in Region 1.
