= Dr. Alien =

1989 sci-fi comedy film directed by David DeCoteau

- Directed by: David DeCoteau
- Written by: Kenneth J. Hall
- Produced by: David DeCoteau; John Schouweiler
- Starring: Billy Jacoby; Olivia Barash; Stuart Fratkin; Troy Donahue; Arlene Golonka; Raymond O'Connor; Bobby Jacoby; Judy Landers
- Cinematography: Nicholas Von Sternberg
- Edited by: Tony Malanowski
- Music by: Reg Powell; Sam Winans
- Distributed by: Paramount Home Video
- Release date: 1989
- Running time: 90 minutes
- Country: United States
- Language: English

Dr. Alien is a 1989 American science fiction comedy film starring Judy Landers, Billy Jacoby, and Olivia Barash. Directed by David DeCoteau, the film was also released under the titles I Was a Teenage Sex Maniac and I Was a Teenage Sex Mutant. The alternative titles explain the movie's plot.

The film's plot centers on an unpopular honors student named Wesley Littlejohn (Billy Jacoby), who becomes involved in an experiment headed by his new, sexy biology teacher, Ms. Xenobia (Judy Landers). As part of the experiment, Wesley becomes a chick magnet whenever a phallic stalk emerges from his head. However, this threatens to alienate the girl he really cares about, Leanne (Oliva Barash), and Wesley begins to suspect Xenobia's motives, which may have something to do with the fact that she isn't from Earth.

== Plot ==
Biology teacher Dr. Ackerman crashes his car one night after encountering a UFO.

Nerdy Wesley Littlejohn is a doting son, opposite to his slacker brother Bradford, set to attend a prestigious college. Along with his opportunistic best friend Marvin, the two are in Ackerman's class. A stereotypical nerd, bullied at school and relying on Marvin to defuse confrontations, Wesley is also in love with a girl named Leanne, but is too shy to make any kind of approach to her.

That day, in Ackerman's place, a sexy, blond substitute teacher named Ms. Xenobia arrives and informs the class she will be teaching for the time being. All the boys in the class are stunned at having such a sexy woman as a teacher, apart from Wesley. Seeking a participant in an experiment, all the boys volunteer but Wesley. On the promise of extra credit, though, Wesley raises his hand to Xenobia's selection.

Wesley returns after school, where he encounters Drax, Xenobia's assistant. Xenobia arrives and explains that the experiment involves being injected with a vitamin supplement and observing Wesley's reaction. Wesley does not want to participate and Xenobia agrees, before injecting him with the "supplement" when his back is turned. A phallic stalk starts to emerge from Wesley's head as a result. Becoming sexually excited by the sight of the stalk, Xenobia proceeds to remove her lab coat, revealing white lingerie underneath. She then has sex with Wesley (who is oblivious to his surroundings) with Drax recording the findings. After the "experiment", Wesley is sent home.

At home, Wesley's family start to notice changes; Wesley becomes more confident and assured, which allows him to get closer to Leeanne. After the experiment, however, there is a tendency for the stalk to emerge at the most inconvenient times, usually when there are women around. This leads to several sexual encounters with them, notably with a former bully's girlfriend and the gym teacher Miss Buckmeister. Each time these encounters happen, Wesley is left with amnesia, and he starts to suspect Xenobia has given him something more than a vitamin supplement. Challenging Xenobia on the experiments, he is again injected with the serum and has sex with Xenobia.

Away from school, Wesley becomes the singer of a heavy metal band called the Sex Mutants (prior to this, he played classical piano). He also goes on a date with Leanne, although it is interrupted by the stalk which leads Leanne to become passionate with him before "waking up" and accusing Wesley of trying to take things too fast. Later, Wesley protests his innocence and invites her to a Sex Mutants gig.

The Sex Mutants play, with support from the Poon Tangs (an all-girl group featuring Ginger Lynn Allen, Linnea Quigley & Laura Albert). After the show has finished, Wesley is backstage with the Poon Tangs when Leanne arrives. Shocked that Wesley appears to be flirting with the girls, she runs off and Wesley follows her. Outside the venue, Wesley encounters Xenobia, who is wearing a silver spacesuit. Xenobia informs Wesley that she and Drax are aliens from the planet Alterion who had been experimenting on him to help their race, as the males of their species lost the ability to procreate and Xenobia was tasked with finding a cure. With humans having a similar biology to her species, she and Drax landed on Earth (inadvertently causing Ackerman's demise) and began their experiments with Wesley. When a skeptical Wesley does not believe this, Xenobia then proceeds to peel off her face, revealing that she is in fact a blue-skinned alien with a large head. Wesley panics, throws Xenobia into a garbage can, and flees.

Wesley returns to the school (encountering Drax) where he blows up the biology lab, destroying Xenobia's serum. Meanwhile, Xenobia starts to shoot up the music venue with a ray gun. Wesley arrives with the last batch of serum and threatens to drop it unless Xenobia stops her violent spree. When Xenobia refuses, Wesley destroys the serum, shocking her enough that her rampage ends.

Despondent that the chances of saving her race are over, Drax appears with a stalk growing from his head; he had taken some of the serum because he was in love with Xenobia. This allows Xenobia to have a change of heart and she apologizes for all the hassle she caused Wesley. The film ends as Xenobia and Drax head home to their planet, while Wesley continues his new career with the Sex Mutants and his relationship with Leeanne.

== Cast ==
- Billy Jacoby as Wesley Littlejohn
- Judy Landers as Ms. Xenobia
- Olivia Barash as Leeanne
- Troy Donahue as Dr. Ackerman
- Stuart Fratkin as Marvin
- Arlene Golonka as Mrs. Littlejohn
- Jim Hackett as Mr. Littlejohn
- Bobby Jacoby as Bradford Littlejohn
- Scott Morris as Dirk
- Julie Gray as Karla
- Raymond O'Connor as Drax
- Edy Williams as Buckmeister
- Ginger Lynn Allen as Rocker Chick #1
- Linnea Quigley as Rocker Chick #2
- Laura Albert as Rocker Chick #3
- Michelle Bauer as Coed #1
- Karen Russell as Coed #2

== Production ==
Brad Pitt originally auditioned for the lead role. Director DeCoteau said in an interview that while Pitt didn't fit the role, he had a feeling Pitt would go on to bigger things. Two years later, he was happy to see he was right when he saw Pitt in Thelma & Louise (1991).
