= Valet Girls =

- Directed by: Rafal Zielinski
- Written by: Clark Carlton
- Produced by: Debra Dion; Dennis Murphy
- Starring: Meri D. Marshall; April Stewart; Mary Kohnert; Jack DeLeon; Jon Sharp; Michael Karm; Steven Lyon; Randy Vasquez; Stuart Fratkin; Tony Cox
- Cinematography: Nicholas Josef von Sternberg
- Edited by: Akiko B. Metz
- Music by: Bob Parr
- Distributed by: Empire International Pictures; Vestron Video
- Release date: January 1987
- Running time: 82 min.
- Country: United States
- Language: English

Valet Girls is a 1987 American comedy film directed by Rafal Zielinski, written by Clark Carlton, and starring Meri D. Marshall, April Stewart, Mary Kohnert, Jack DeLeon, Jon Sharp, Michael Karm, Steven Lyon, Randy Vasquez, Stuart Fratkin, and Tony Cox. The plot concerns three women in Los Angeles who are working as valet girls while trying to get started in the entertainment industry. The film was produced by Lexyn Productions and distributed by Empire International Pictures and Vestron Video.

Tony Cox appears as Lucy's friend and manager, Sammy. Ron Jeremy also made an appearance in an uncredited, minor role.

== Plot ==
The story revolves around Lucy (Meri D. Marshall), who wants to be a rock star, Rosalind (April Stewart), a brain pretending to be a bimbo, and Carnation (Mary Kohnert), who wants to be an actress. These three girls get a job parking cars for a big movie star named Dirk Zebra (Jack DeLeon) who throws regular house parties so that he and his fellow actor Lindsey Brawnsworth (Jon Sharp) and a record producer, Alvin Sunday (Michael Karm) can attract and seduce aspiring starlets.

Between parking cars, the three girls have to dodge the amorous attention of the party-goers while Lucy and Carnation try to get influential people to pay attention to their musical and acting talents. The party is sabotaged by members of a competing valet company (played by Steven Lyon, Randy Vasquez, and Stuart Fratkin) and the girls are blamed and fired. With the help of Dirk Zebra's wife Tina (Patricia Scott Michel) and Carnation's boyfriend Archie Lee (John Terlesky) the valet girls humiliate Dirk Zebra, Lindsey Brawnsworth, and the members of the other valet company.

== Cast ==
- Meri D. Marshall as Lucy
- April Stewart as Rosalind
- Mary Kohnert as Carnation
- Jack DeLeon as Dirk Zebra (credited as Christopher Weeks)
- Patricia Scott Michel as Tina Zebra
- Jon Sharp as Lindsey Brawnsworth
- Michael Karm as Alvin Sunday
- Steven Lyon as Ike (credited as Steve Lyon)
- Randy Vasquez as Ramon (credited as Randy Gallon)
- Stuart Fratkin as Dash
- John Terlesky as Archie Lee Samples
- Jean Byron as Edie Smegmite (credited as Jeane Byron)
- Charles Cooper as Victor Smegmite
- Kenny Sacha as Tim Cheeseman
- Tony Cox as Sammy Rodenko
- Rick Lieberman as Charles Danson
- Bridget Sienna as Yolanda
- Matt Landers as Danny
- Elizabeth Lamers as Greta "Grueling Greta"
- Elise Richards as Cindy
- Rebecca Cruz as Egypt Von Sand Dunes
- Valerie Richards as Busty Girl
- Janette Caldwell as Beautiful Girl
- Kim Gillingham as Madonna Wannabe
- Barbara Dare as Party Girl (uncredited)
- Ron Jeremy as Party Guest On Couch (uncredited)

== Home media release ==
Valet Girls was released on VHS by Lions Gate on April 15, 1987.
