= Charles Cooper (actor) =

American actor

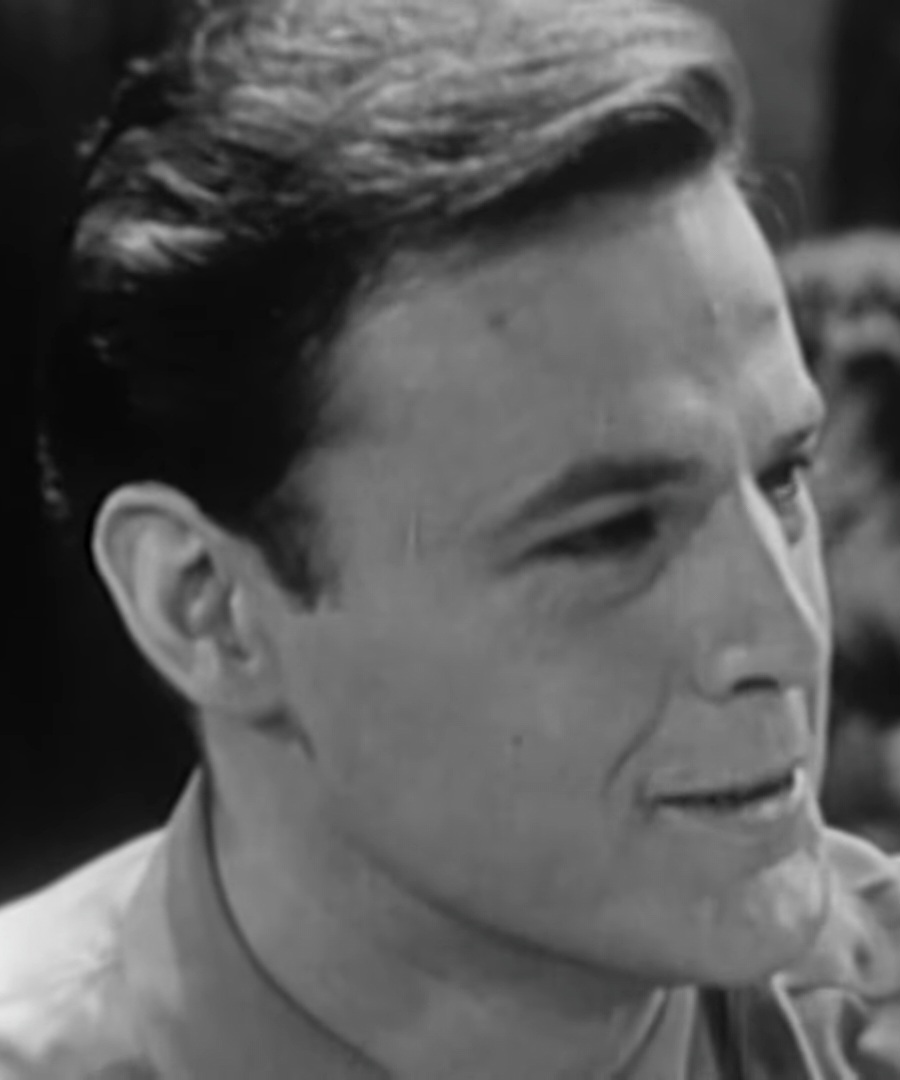
- Cooper in Suspense (1952)
- Born: Charles Darwin Cooper; August 11, 1926
- Died: November 29, 2013 (aged 87); Los Angeles, California, U.S.
- Occupations: Film, television actor
- Years active: 1950–2001
- Spouse: Pamela Searle (m. 1961)
- Children: 4

Charles Darwin Cooper (August 11, 1926 – November 29, 2013) was an American actor who played a wide variety of television and film roles. On Broadway, Cooper appeared in The Winner (1954) and All You Need Is One Good Break (1950).

== Biography ==
In 1958 he played outlaw Cando in Season 3 Episode 36 of "Gunsmoke" titled "Chester's Hanging", and again as murderer Jim Box in the S4E17 episode “Young Love”.

Also in 1958, Cooper played the outlaw Tate Masters in the episode "Twelve Guns" of NBC's Western television series Cimarron City with George Montgomery and John Smith and played Lt. William Rath in "The Deserter" episode of Tales of Wells Fargo. In 1959, he played a gunfighter, Jack Rollins, in the episode "The Visitor" of Lawman, an ABC/Warner Bros. Television Western series. He was cast as Matt Yordy in the 1961 episode "Honest Abe" of Chuck Connors' The Rifleman. He also played Larsen in S5 E6 "I Take This Woman" which aired 11/4/1962, and Rudy Croft S4 E4 "The Stand In" that aired 10/23/1961.

Cooper made four guest appearances on Perry Mason, including the role of murderer Philip Strague in the 1958 episode, "The Case of the Buried Clock". His final appearance in 1962 was as Ben Willoughby in "The Case of the Poison Pen-Pal".

Cooper is perhaps best remembered for his appearances in Star Trek-related roles. He played the Klingon chancellor K'mpec in Star Trek: The Next Generation episodes "Sins of the Father" and "Reunion" and the Klingon General Korrd in Star Trek V: The Final Frontier.

His other film roles included appearances in the Alfred Hitchcock film The Wrong Man (1956), A Dog's Best Friend (1959), the comedy Valet Girls (1987), and the action film Blind Fury (1989) starring Rutger Hauer.

Cooper died in 2013. He was survived by his wife Pamela Searle and their three children.

== Filmography ==
Year	Title	Role	Notes
1950	Mr. H.C. Andersen		
1956	The Wrong Man	Detective Matthews	
1957	Alfred Hitchcock Presents	Bernard K. Froy	Season 2 Episodes 25, 26, 27: "I Killed the Count Part 1", "I Killed the Count Part 2", "I Killed the Count Part 3"
1959	A Dog's Best Friend	Deputy Sheriff Bill Beamer	
1961	Gun Fight	Cole Fender	
1969	The Big Bounce	Senator	
1978	Rabbit Test	Second Presidential Aide	
1983	Sweetwater	Vince Cunningham	
1987	Valet Girls	Victor Smegmite	
1989	Twice Under	Sergeant Fitz	
1989	Star Trek V: The Final Frontier	General Korrd	
1989	Blind Fury	Ed Cobb	
1995	Panther	Sheriff	
1995	Huntress: Spirit of the Night	Ty Bodi	
2001	April's Fool	Jimmy	
