= Donnie or Marie =

- The Killing episode
- Episode no.: Season 2 Episode 12
- Directed by: Keith Gordon
- Written by: Wendy Riss; Aaron Zelman
- Production code: BDH212/S212
- Original air date: June 10, 2012

Guest appearances
- Tom Butler as Mayor Lesley Adams; Seth Isaac Johnson as Denny Larsen; Evan Bird as Tommy Larsen; Claudia Ferri as Nicole Jackson; Patti Kim as Roberta Drays; Lee Garlington as Ruth Yitanes; Grayson Gabriel as Yacht Club Valet; Marcel Maillard as Ted Wright; Katie Findlay as Rosie Larsen; Barclay Hope as Michael Ames

Episode chronology
← Previous "Bulldog"	Next → "What I Know"
- The Killing (season 2)

"Donnie or Marie" is the twenty-fifth episode of the American television drama series The Killing, and the twelfth of its second season, which aired on the AMC channel in the United States on June 10, 2012. The episode is billed as the first of a two-part season finale. It is co-written by Wendy Riss and Aaron Zelman and directed by Keith Gordon. In the episode, the detectives look to Richmond's campaign staff for suspects, while he gets ready for the election; and Mitch and Stan Larsen try to get their family back to normal.

== Plot ==
Picking up where the previous episode left off, Linden (Mireille Enos) and Holder (Joel Kinnaman) peg Gwen and Jamie as prime suspects—the only ones in Richmond's campaign with enough power to broker a deal between the Indians and Michael Ames. The detectives enter Mayor Adams' office and strike a deal: he (Tom Butler) will keep Lt. Carlson off their backs and they will not expose Adams' involvement in the doctored toll booth photo of Richmond. Linden insists they are fighting a common enemy, noting that Richmond's camp planted the Indian bones at Adams' waterfront construction site.

At the Larsen home, Terry (Jamie Anne Allman) and the boys return from trick-or-treating. Denny (Seth Isaac Johnson) embraces Mitch when he sees her, but Tommy (Evan Bird) walks away. Terry later surprises Mitch with the news that Stan bought a house and argues when Mitch defends her long absence. She tells Mitch that she has been trying to keep the family together while Mitch was on "some vision quest".

Linden and Holder review Jamie and Gwen's alibis on the night of Rosie's murder. Holder says Jamie was with his grandfather all night, then went to the city hall gym at 4:37 a.m. — without his keycard, according to a guard. The next morning, Holder calls Linden to report that Jamie's grandfather confirmed Jamie's alibi. At City Hall, Linden asks a Richmond campaign worker (Sachin Sahel) to identify the owner of the blood-stained keycard. He says the list of keycard IDs was mysteriously deleted from his hard drive soon after Rosie's murder, but adds that Gwen requested a new keycard after the murder.

At the casino, Holder and Linden see Chief Jackson (Claudia Ferri) and Roberta Drays (Patti Kim) arguing and deduce that they are romantically involved. Jackson gives them security camera footage from the night of Rosie's murder — minus footage from the elevator camera, which she claims is broken. Linden sees a photo from the casino's grand opening and points out Gwen (Kristin Lehman) and Senator Eaton (Alan Dale) standing alongside Chief Jackson.

Councilwoman Ruth Yitanes (Lee Garlington) tells the detectives that Gwen canceled their dinner plans on the night of Rosie's murder. When asked if the Richmond campaign has links to a Michael Ames' company, Yitanes says the company donates to Mayor Adams.

Richmond (Billy Campbell) emerges from the voting booth. The press takes pictures of him and Mayor Adams together. Adams quietly tells Richmond his career is over. Outside, Gwen and Richmond hold hands, she laments that she "tried so hard" for him.

At the city-planning department, the detectives learn that Ames has several companies. His newest had its authorization to bid on city contracts expedited by Jamie and that Michael's wife Sally's name is not on the new company, which has landed the contract for the mayor's waterfront construction site.

Linden and Holder question Jamie (Eric Ladin) about Ames' new company. He says he expedited the request in an attempt to woo Ames as a campaign donor. When asked about his keycard, he shows it to Holder. Linden later wonders if Gwen and Jamie are both involved in Rosie's murder. Holder speculates that Gwen canceled her dinner with Yitanes upon learning about the waterfront break-in.

In the Larsen garage, Stan (Brent Sexton) smiles upon hearing about Janek's death on the radio. Mitch (Michelle Forbes) says she knows about the second house and Stan suggests they move for a "fresh start." They argue about leaving the memories of Rosie behind and moving on with their lives.

The detectives visit the yacht club, where a valet (Grayson Gabriel) shares the guest sign-in log for October 5. Gwen's name is signed in at 8:37 p.m. with a license plate number that matches the campaign car in which Rosie's body was found. They question Gwen, who admits she recently lost her keycard but maintains she was at a Tacoma bed and breakfast on the night of Rosie's murder. Linden asks her about the campaign car, but she warns them to be careful with murder accusations. Later at Holder's apartment, Linden studies the grand opening photo and notices Jackson's former head of security had a broken arm. At the casino, the detectives tell Drays that Jackson framed her former head of security for murder and will eventually do the same to her. They demand to see all withheld casino security footage from the night of Rosie's murder.

Richmond's campaign team erupts in cheers when they learn Richmond and Adams are now close in the poll numbers. He receives a phone call, asking what the caller wants as he watches Gwen and Jamie talk. Richmond's driver drops him off at the house of Jamie's grandfather, Ted Wright (Marcel Maillard). Jamie later arrives and asks his grandfather what was so important that he needed to talk to him, then he sees Richmond, who asks Jamie why he lied to him.

The detectives watch the missing security footage, which reveals the campaign car pulling up at 12:58 a.m. Holder plays a second disc, labeled "10th floor elevator." They watch Rosie (Katie Findlay) enter the elevator at 1:02 a.m., Chief Jackson enters it at 1:04 a.m., and Michael Ames (Barclay Hope) enters it at 1:05. Finally, at 1:07, Jamie enters the elevator and looks directly into the camera.

== Reception ==
=== Critical reception ===
"Donnie or Marie" received positive reviews. Sean McKenna of TV Fanatic rated the episode 4.6 out of 5 stars and "could barely move" after watching the episode. "There's still a sense of not really having any clue who killed Rosie, which may be extremely obnoxious to some and perfectly riveting to others. But that noir tone has never changed, The characters have remained true to themselves flaws and all, and the case, while at times long winded, in these last few episodes has felt like it's moved somewhere, giving us something to grasp onto and feel as if the answers are within our reach." The A.V. Club's Brandon Nowalk rated this episode a B, calling it a "suspenseful cliffhanger" and comparing the cross-editing to the previous episode "Bulldog" by stating: "The difference is that last week cut between an absorbing dramatic scene and an energetic detective scene while "Donny Or Marie" [sic] cuts between two thrilling mysteries surfing each other's wakes. Instead of falling through the dramatic pauses, the momentum carries all the way through the finale." William Bibbiani of CraveOnline was pleased to see an episode dedicated to the murder investigation. He stated: "I've been saying throughout this season that The Killing would have to really step up its game in the last few episodes to make the last 11 episodes seem like they were worth the trouble, and while 'Donnie or Marie' is certainly a strong one, it's not so revelatory or dramatic that it forgives the failings of the season that precedes it. If every episode of the season was this good, The Killing would have been a much better series. But even then, it would need to really end with a glorified bang to justify the buildup."

=== Ratings ===
The episode was watched by 1.84 million viewers, making it the most viewed episode of the season, and scored a 0.5 rating in the 18-49 demographic, even with the previous episode.
