= Dean Cameron =

American actor, comedian, and musician

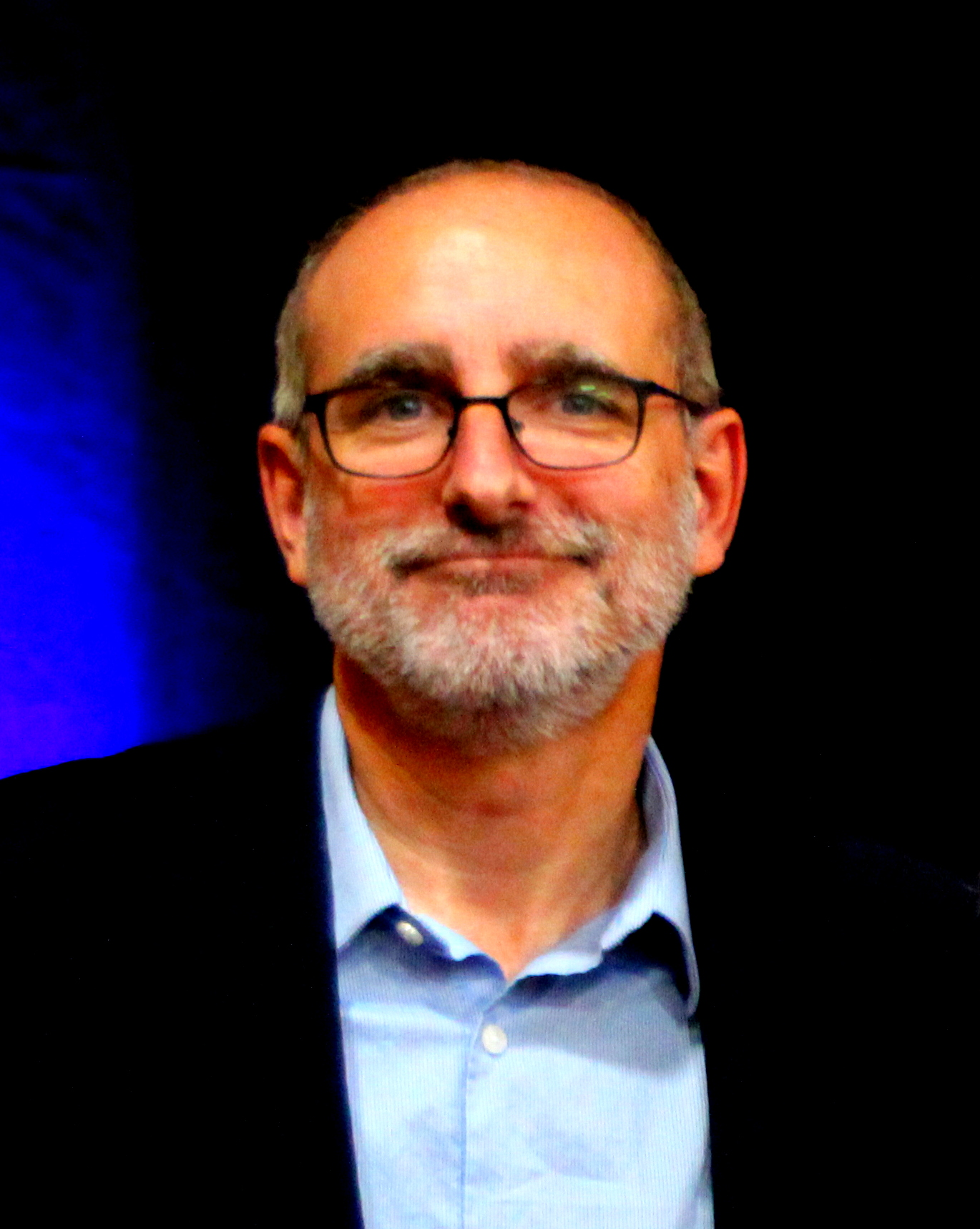
- Cameron in July 2015
- Born: Dean Eikleberry; December 25, 1962 (age 63); Morrison, Illinois, U.S.
- Occupations: Actor; comedian; musician
- Years active: 1983–present
- Known for: Francis "Chainsaw" Gremp in Summer School, Dave Marshak in Ski School and Ski School 2 and for The Nigerian Spam Scam Scam
- Spouse: Jessie Marion (m. 2004)
- Children: 1
- Website: DeanCameron.com

Dean Cameron (born Dean Eikleberry; December 25, 1962) is an American actor and musician. He is known for his role as Francis "Chainsaw" Gremp in the 1987 Mark Harmon comedy Summer School. He also played Dave Marshak in Ski School and Ski School 2. Cameron, along with comedian Victor Isaac, tour in a two-person show that Cameron wrote, called The Nigerian Spam Scam Scam.

== Early life ==
Cameron was born in Morrison, Illinois, the son of Kay Elizabeth (Kytle) Huff and Burton Robert Eikleberry. He spent his childhood in Oklahoma and summers in Santa Barbara, California.

== Career ==
Cameron's film roles included Francis "Chainsaw" Gremp in the Mark Harmon film Summer School (1987), the pizza delivery man in Men at Work (1990), and Dave Marshak in Ski School (1991) and Ski School 2 (1994). He has also starred in short-lived television series like Spencer (1984), Fast Times (1986, a spinoff of the 1982 film Fast Times at Ridgemont High), They Came from Outer Space (1990), and Mister Sterling (2003). He made guest appearances on many TV series, including The Facts of Life, ALF, My Sister Sam, Will & Grace, Mad About You, ER, Felicity, Psych, Shameless, and It's Always Sunny in Philadelphia.

He performs a two-person show, The Nigerian Spam Scam Scam, in which he and actor Victor Isaac read from Cameron's 11-month correspondence with a Nigerian 419 scammer. The show was performed at the Edinburgh Fringe Comedy Festival in 2004 and 2005, the Just For Laughs festival and the Upright Citizens Brigade theater in 2006 and ran in Los Angeles from September 2004 to December 2004. The first professional show was at The Amaz!ng Meeting, TAM2 for the James Randi Educational Foundation in 2004.

Cameron co-wrote the 2001 feature film Hollywood Palms, wrote and directed a short film, "Glutton Falls" and directed/choreographed "Bukowsical", a late night musical theater parody at the Sacred Fools Theater Company in Los Angeles, California. Cameron directed the videos "Fat Girl" and "Pussy Whipped" for heavy metal band Steel Panther as well as co-wrote the song "Girl From Oklahoma" on their 2009 debut album Feel the Steel and "Supersonic Sex Machine" on their 2011 follow-up album Balls Out. Cameron also co-wrote and directed a presentation pilot for Steel Panther.

In 2006, he originated the role of Carl in Love Tapes, a play based on videotapes sent by a fan to guitarist Steve Vai. Love Tapes was written by Steven Banks and Penn Jillette and directed by Cameron's wife, Jessie Marion.

Cameron was one of the camera operators during the filming of the 2005 film The Aristocrats. During the 2005 Edinburgh Fringe Festival, he and comedian Paul Provenza shot a live version of The Aristocrats. The intent was to release it on the Special Features of the DVD. Cameron explained to actor Samm Levine in an interview, "We ended up naked and had props like mayonnaise, mustard and ketchup... applejuice... puppets... ". Because they were shooting late at night in a Scottish pub, no one had releases with them, one of the actors refused to sign the form afterwards and the film was never released.

Cameron is mentioned in the comedy-drama TV show Psych when character Shawn Spencer (played by actor James Roday) states, "No one paints a scene like Dean Cameron". The Robot Chicken television series also mentions him on their Christmas special during the introduction. The Star Trek parody opening says "Christmas, the birthday of Jesus, also the birthday of actor Dean Cameron, who played Chainsaw in the movie Summer School, now we celebrate these equally important men with the Robot Chicken Christmas Special".

Since late 1999, has worked as voiceover talent for radio and television commercials and animated series like Regular Show and We Bare Bears.

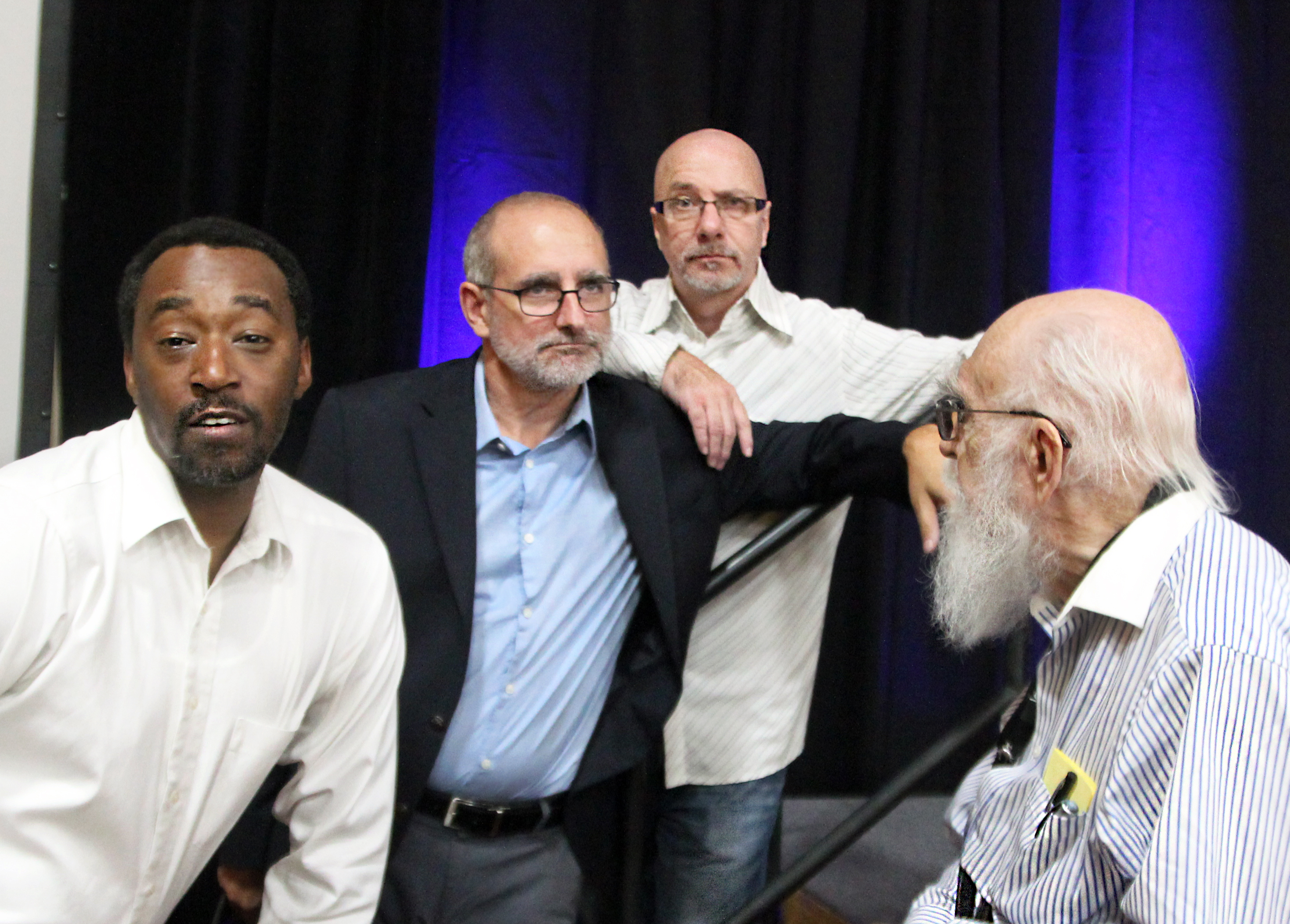
Victor Isaac, Cameron, Emery Emery and James Randi at the James Randi Educational Foundation's The Amaz!ng Meeting in 2015

== Music ==
His first purchased album was the hip hop record Straight Outta Compton which he played "the hell out of". Cameron credits his ability to play the guitar to Tammy Moore, a girl from the ninth grade. She asked him if he could play an instrument and he lied and said "I play banjo," The next day, he told her that he also played the guitar. "I had to learn how to play the guitar pretty quickly". He spent the next six months learning to play "Stairway to Heaven" from a friend. In the 1980s, he switched to the bass guitar.

In 2003, Cameron played bass guitar for a LA, local band called The Thornbirds (formerly called The Ducks). Cameron co-wrote the songs "Girl from Oklahoma" and "Supersonic Sex Machine" for the band Steel Panther, two of the members later joined The Thornbirds. When that group released All The Same in 2004, both of the songs were on that album. Cameron is also in a karaoke band that parodies actor/musicians, Corey Haim, Corey Feldman and Corey Hart called Coreyoke. Cameron says on his website that "may be the most fun i’ve ever had in my long life." The story line behind Coreyoke is that they are musicians from the 1980s who are trying to revive their careers and play backup for Michael Jackson.

== Personal life ==
Cameron is married to Jessie Marion, granddaughter of actress Elena Verdugo, and lives in Los Angeles. Their son, Duncan, was born in August 2009. Cameron grew up without religion, and was a teen before he realized that "there was a thing called atheism". He credits his father with teaching him and his siblings to think critically.

Listed as a hard-core Libertarian on Cameron's IMDB profile, he tells interviewer Samm Levine that he prefers the term "Freedom Fighter". Cameron is also the inventor of the Bill of Rights: Security Edition Cards which have the Bill of Rights stamped on metal the size of a normal playing card. The idea is that they can be carried comfortably in the pocket of a flyer, and when a metal detector beeps after detecting the metal, the carrier will have to hand the TSA federal inspectors the card and "give up his Bill of Rights... before boarding a plane." The website also sells Bill of Rights luggage tags and socks with the rights printed on them.

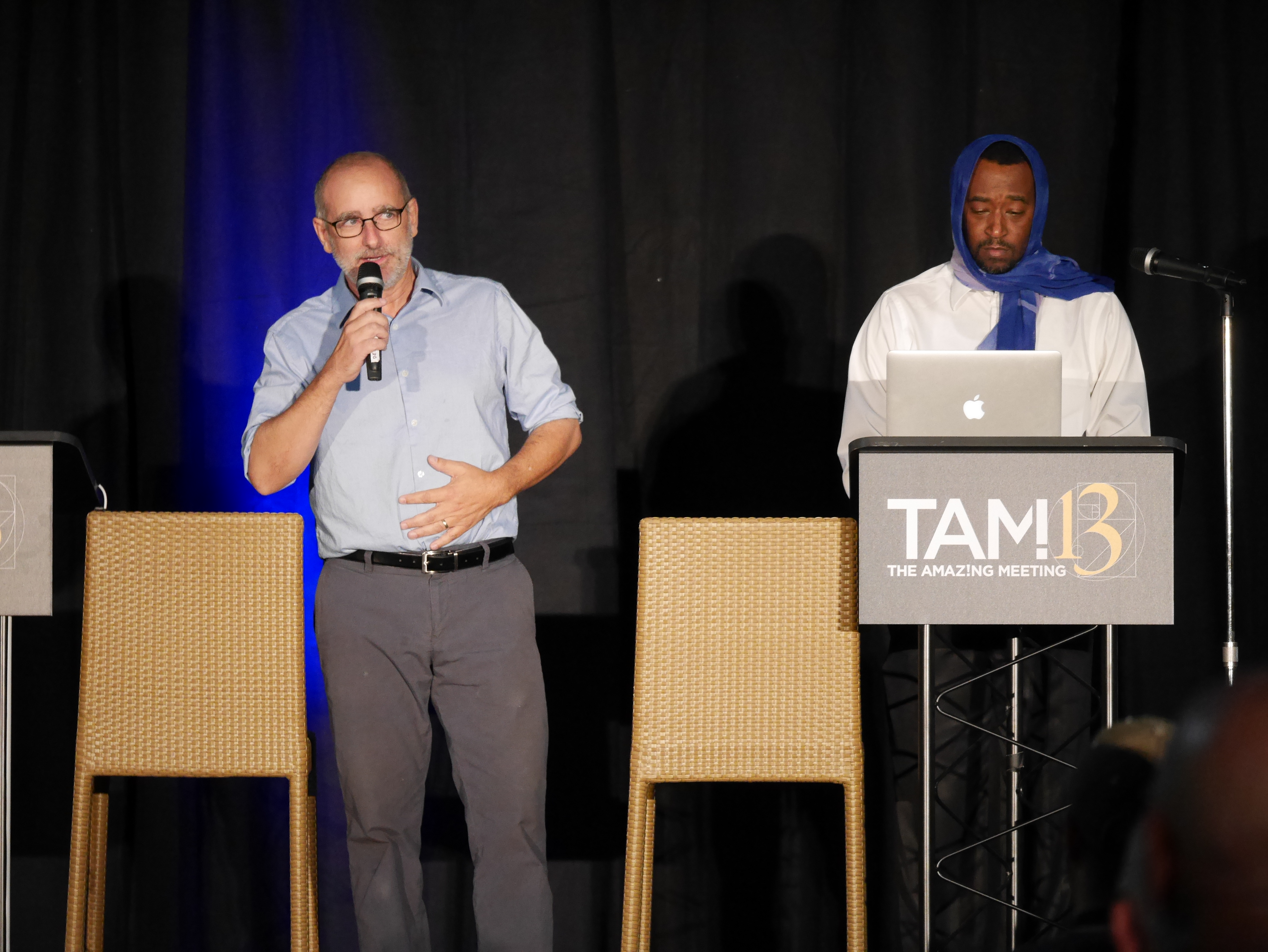
Cameron and Isaac at James Randi Educational Foundation TAM13 2015

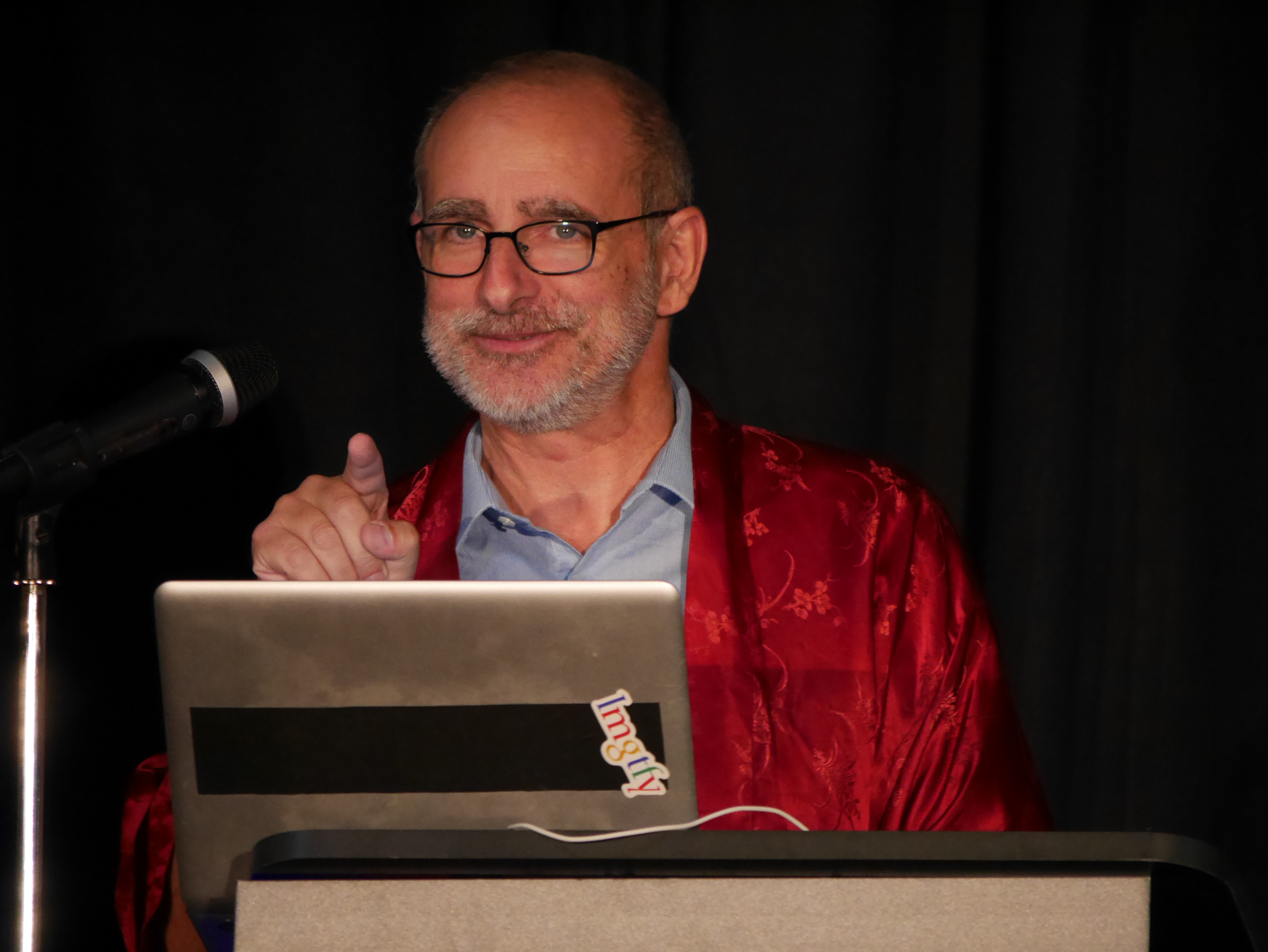
Nigerian Spam Scam Scam 2015 Las Vegas

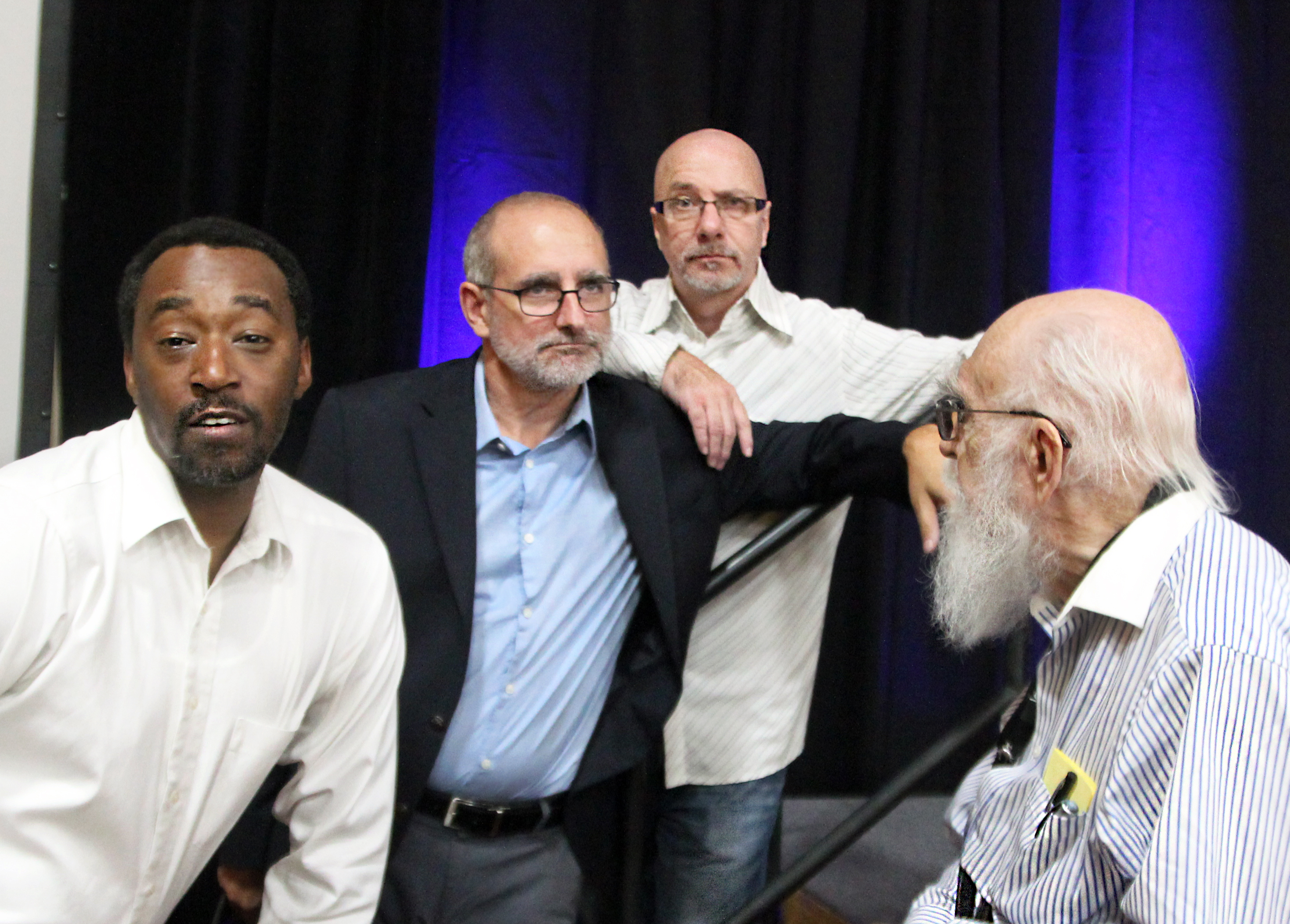
Isaac (L), Cameron, Emery Emery, and James Randi at TAM13 2015

== Filmography ==
Film
Title	Year	Notes
Found Footage: The Making of the Patterson Project	2025	Also producer
Dead Sea	2024	
Radio America	2015	
Grindsploitation	2015	
Straight Outta Compton	2015	
Judy Moody and the Not Bummer Summer	2011	
Hole in One	2010	
The Growth	2009	
Arrow Heads	2009	
Doing His Best	2007	
I'm Not Gay	2005	
Rainbow's End	2005	
The Benefits of Drinking Whiskey	2005	
The Curse of the Hideous Gimp	2005	
Grace and the Storm	2004	
Tan Lines: The Making of Suntanned Bikini	2003	
The Palindrome Affair	2003	
Sit and Spin	2002	
Hollywood Palms	2001	
Deep Core	2000	
It's a Shame About Ray	2000	
Two-Eleven	1999	
Hi-Life	1998	
Some Girl (uncredited)	1998	
Midnight Blue	1997	
Highball	1997	
Kicking and Screaming	1995	
Ski School 2	1994	
Sleep with Me	1994	
Charlie's Ghost Story	1994	
The Killing Box	1993	
Miracle Beach	1992	
Ski School	1991	
Men at Work	1990	
Disturbed	1990	
Rockula	1990	
Bad Dreams	1988	
Summer School	1987	
Facing It: My Friend's an Alcoholic	1985	

Television
Title	Year
Paradise	2025
It's Always Sunny in Philadelphia	2016
Shameless	2014
Psych (season 8, episode 120)	2014
TMI Hollywood	2014
The Comeback Kids	2014
Instant Mom	2013
The Newsroom	2013
Glee	2013
The Neighbors	2013
American Horror Story	2012
See Dad Run	2012
The Mentalist	2012
Southland	2012
Doing His Best James Dean	2007
Mister Sterling	2003
State of Emergency	1994
They Came from Outer Space	1990
ALF	1990
Fast Times	1986
Prince of Bel Air	1986
Things Are Looking Up	1984
Spencer	1984
