= Prehysteria! =

- Home video cover art for the first film
- Directed by: Albert Band; Charles Band; David DeCoteau
- Written by: Mark Goldstein; Greg Suddeth; Brent Friedman; Michael Davis; Neil Ruttenberg
- Story by: Pete von Sholly
- Produced by: Charles Band; Karen L. Spencer
- Starring: Owen Bush; Austin O'Brien; Kevin Connors; Whitney Anderson; Brett Cullen; Bruce Weitz
- Cinematography: Adolfo Bartoli (1) and James Lawrence Spencer (2 and 3)
- Production company: Moonbeam Entertainment
- Distributed by: Paramount Home Video
- Running time: 250 minutes (3 films)
- Country: United States
- Language: English

Prehysteria! is a series of three family monster comedy films made in the early to mid-1990s about the adventures of five miniature baby dinosaurs named after famous pop musicians. The dinosaurs were Elvis, a male Tyrannosaurus, Paula, a female Brachiosaurus, Jagger, a male Stegosaurus, Hammer, a male Chasmosaurus, and Madonna, a female Geosternbergia (despite having the crest of a male, and despite the fact that Geosternbergia was a genus of pterosaur rather than a dinosaur). The films were made by Moonbeam Entertainment, the family-oriented sub-brand of B-movie producer Charles Band's Full Moon Entertainment. Richard Band, Michael Bishop, and Fuzzbee Morse composed the music for the films.

== Development ==
In the early 1990s, Charles Band was working on a new label from Full Moon Entertainment, called Moonbeam Entertainment. Moonbeam Entertainment was created specifically for family, science fiction and fantasy films created for children and adults with no "hard edge" to them. Around the same time, storyboard artist Peter von Sholly, approached Band with a concept about creating a movie about miniature dinosaurs. Band, intrigued with the idea, thought that it was perfect to be the first Moonbeam film. David Allen Productions and Mark Rappaport created the special effects for all of the films.

The first Prehysteria! was co-directed by Charles and Albert Band and it was released in 1993 direct to video. Due to its outcome, a sequel, Prehysteria! 2, was quickly developed and released in 1994. No character from the first film returned, but Albert Band returned to direct. In 1995, Moonbeam developed a second sequel entitled Prehysteria! 3. David DeCoteau directed the film. The only returning character was Owen Bush from the second film. All of the films were released by Paramount Home Video. Besides the dinosaurs, Mr. Cranston (Owen Bush) is the only returning character in the series. The Stegosaurus, Jagger, never appeared on the first three film posters. Prehysteria! was Austin O'Brien's first lead role. The Tyrannosaurus, Elvis, and Brachiosaurus, Paula, have appeared on all of the film posters. The dinosaurs in the first three films were realized by traditional stop motion animation and rod puppets. Prehysteria! 2 and Prehysteria! 3 were both aimed at younger audiences. Madonna the Geosternbergia hurt her wing in Prehysteria! 2, so that the producers could save money on the cost of stop motion animation. In Prehysteria! 3, Madonna does not fly. Prehysteria! was the first Moonbeam Entertainment film. Prehysteria 2 was Moonbeam's first sequel. The characters of "Richie", played by Stuart Fratkin and "Louis", played by Tony Longo from the first Prehysteria!, were brought back to star in another Moonbeam Production, "Remote", because they had done so well as comedic thugs in Prehysteria!.

== Films ==
=== Prehysteria! ===
Released in 1993, Prehysteria! tells the story of Rico Sarno, a museum curator, who enters a forbidden temple in South America and discovers a nest of five eggs. He steals them and brings them to his museum. Frank Taylor (Brett Cullen), a raisin farmer, sells fossils to Rico and in a mix-up, the Taylor's dog takes a cooler, which has the eggs. The kids, Monica (Samantha Mills) and Jerry (Austin O'Brien) discover the dinosaurs when they hatch and try to keep it a secret, until their father finds out. When Vicki Vandell (Colleen Morris), a woman who works for Rico, sees the dinosaurs, she tells the Taylors not to give them back to Rico because he will expose them. Rico finds out the Taylors have them and hires two robbers to help him get the dinosaurs back.

==== Cast ====
- Brett Cullen as Frank Taylor
- Colleen Morris as Vicki Vandell
- Samantha Mills as Monica Taylor
- Austin O'Brien as Jerry Taylor
- Tony Longo as Louis
- Stuart Fratkin as Ritchie
- Stephen Lee as Rico Sarno
- Tom Williams as "Whitey"
- Frank Welker as Elvis, Paula, Jagger, Hammer and Madonna

=== Prehysteria! 2 ===
Prehysteria! 2 was the sequel to the first film and was released in 1994. Mr. Cranston is a friend of the Taylors and he watches the mini-dinosaurs while they are on vacation. The five mini-dinosaurs break out of the Taylors' farm and accidentally get shipped into a crate of raisins. The crate is found in a box car by Naomi (Jennifer Harte), a girl whose father works at the train station and a rich kid named Brendan Wellington (Kevin Connors) who is hiding in the box car because he is being chased by bullies who are about to attack him. When the two discover the raisin crate, they get into an argument on who should keep the dinosaurs, Brendan claiming that he saw them first and Naomi claiming them on the fact that it is her box car. Brendan pays a worker for the crate, knowing that the dinosaurs are inside. Brendan is unhappy because he has no friends and is desperate for attention because his father does not spend much time with him. Naomi and Brendan later become friends and the mini-dinosaurs help the boy get the attention he needs, and try to save him from his abusive mistress Miss Winters who is allergic to animals. When she finds out about Brendan having pets (not knowing that they are dinosaurs), she hires two exterminators. She also views Brendan as a child with a lot of problems and wants to send him to a disciplinary school.

==== Cast ====
- Kevin Connors as Brendan Wellington
- Jennifer Harte as Naomi
- Dean Scofield as Mr. Wellington
- Bettye Ackerman as Miss Winters
- Owen Bush as Mr. Cranston
- Greg Lewis as Ivan
- Michael Hagiwara as Mr. Hiro
- Larry Hankin as Ketchum
- Alan Palo as Killam
- Frank Welker as Elvis, Paula, Jagger, Hammer and Madonna

=== Prehysteria! 3 ===
Prehysteria! 3 is the third and final film of the series, and was released in 1995. This time, the five dinosaurs fall out of the back of Mr. Cranston's truck, and they make their way to another family's home. The dinosaurs help the MacGregor family, who is struggling with their mini-putt golf course. Ella MacGregor (Whitney Anderson) is in love with her Scottish culture, but is sad that the mini-putt golf course is going under. She finds the dinosaurs, and with her family's help, they re-build the golf course with a dinosaur theme, which helps them a lot. But Ella's evil uncle Hal MacGregor (Bruce Weitz) is determined to take over the course by all means, and Ella and her parents must hide the mini-dinosaurs to protect them from danger.

==== Cast ====
- Whitney Anderson as Ella MacGregor
- Owen Bush as Mr. Cranston
- Dave Buzzotta as Heath MacGregor
- Thomas Emery Dennis as Dole
- John Fujioka as Mr. Yamamoto
- Matt Letscher as Needlemeyer
- Pam Matteson as Michelle MacGregor
- Michael R. Thayer as Jeff
- Bruce Weitz as Hal MacGregor
- Fred Willard as Thomas MacGregor
- Steven Blum as Elvis, Paula, Jagger, Hammer and Madonna

== Home media ==
By 1995, all of the three films in the Prehysteria! series were out on VHS and laserdisc. The series saw a DVD release in Germany under the title "Jurassic Kids" in 2014.

In 2018, the first film of the series received a Blu-Ray release with a new transfer from the original 35mm camera negative.

== See also ==
- Adventures in Dinosaur City
- Jurassic Park
- List of films featuring dinosaurs
