= Stuart Fratkin =

American actor

- Born: September 22, 1963 (age 61); Los Angeles, California
- Occupation: Actor
- Spouse: Monica Fratkin (m. 1991)

Stuart Fratkin (born September 22, 1963) is an American actor, best known for playing Fitz in the movie Ski School. He also starred in They Came from Outer Space with Ski School co-star Dean Cameron.

== Career ==
Fratkin has been in several films, including Godzilla, Prehysteria!, and Teen Wolf Too. He also has guest starred on many television series over a 20-year career, including Melrose Place, Friends, The Golden Girls, Baywatch, Baywatch Nights, Touched by an Angel, and NYPD Blue.

== Filmography ==
=== Film ===
Year	Title	Role	Notes
1985	Girls Just Want to Have Fun	Sam	
1986	Valet Girls	Dash	
1987	Daddy	Jake	
1987	Teen Wolf Too	Stiles	
1988	Under the Boardwalk	Lapps	
1989	Dr. Alien	Marvin	
1990	Ski School	Fitz Fitzgerald	
1993	Prehysteria!	Ritchie	
1993	Remote	Richie Marinelli	
1998	Godzilla	Utah Ensign	
2016	Pitfire of Hell	Karl's Dad	

=== Television ===
Year	Title	Role	Notes
1985	The Facts of Life	Delivery Boy	Episode: "Into the Frying Pan"
1986	The Golden Girls	Man #2	Episode: "Blind Ambitions"
1986	Silver Spoons	Jerry	Episode: "Rick Sells His Sole"
1986	Sledge Hammer!	8-Track	Episode: "To Sledge, with Love"
1987	My Sister Sam	Mickey	Episode: "Almost In-Laws"
1987	Rags to Riches	Donnie	Episode: "First Love"
1987	The New Adventures of Beans Baxter	Woodshop	9 episodes
1988	Tour of Duty	Larry Carlin	Episode: "USO Down"
1988	Werewolf	Roger	Episode: "A Material Girl"
1989	Matlock	Malcolm	Episode: "The Captain"
1989	Freddy's Nightmares	Pete	Episode: "The Art of Death"
1989	Alien Nation	Bob	Episode: "Contact"
1990	Quantum Leap	Hags	Episode: "Animal Frat"
1990	Knots Landing	Bobby	Episode: "Road Trip"
1990	I'm Dangerous Tonight	Victor	Television film
1990	The New Adam-12	Ernie	Episode: "The Sniper"
1990–1991	They Came from Outer Space	Abe	21 episodes
1991	Baywatch	Clark	Episode: "The Lost Treasure of Tower 12"
1991	Doogie Howser, M.D.	Doctor Briggs	Episode: "It's a Tough Job...But Why Does My Father Have to Do It?"
1993	Johnny Bago	David	Episode: "Spotting Elvis"
1994	Friends	Lowell	Episode: "The One Where Nana Dies Twice"
1995	Melrose Place	Tyler Hirsch	Episode: "Melrose Impossible"
1995	The Rockford Files: A Blessing in Disguise	Jerry Jamison	Television film
1995	Touched by an Angel	Chris	Episode: "Interview with an Angel"
1995	Courthouse	Anthony Gillette	Episode: "Child Support"
1995	Baywatch Nights	Duncan Valentine	Episode: "Kind of a Drag"
1995	Campus Cops	Eddie	Episode: "3,001"
1996	Pacific Blue	Jonathan Levin	Episode: "Genuine Hero"
1996	Sliders	Instructor	Episode: "Season's Greedings"
1996, 2004	NYPD Blue	Various roles	2 episodes
1997	Murder One	Larry Silvestri	Episode: "Chapter Ten, Year Two"
1998	Diagnosis: Murder	Jason Dalloway	Episode: "Wrong Number"
1998	Honey, I Shrunk the Kids: The TV Show	Bopka #1	Episode: "Honey, Name That Tune"
2000	Spin City	Producer	Episode: "The Bone Collectors"
2001	Philly	A.D.A. Doug Sinclair	Episode: "Philly Folly"
2001–2005	Judging Amy	Various roles	3 episodes
2002	Resurrection Blvd.	Steve Walters	Episode: "Las Tristesas de Zake"
2003	Tremors	Rosser	Episode: "Blast from the Past"
2005	That's So Raven	Arthur	Episode: "Art Breaker"
2006	Malcolm in the Middle	Dave	Episode: "Mono"
