= Donny & Marie =

Donny & Marie may refer to any show headlined by Donny Osmond (one of the Osmond Brothers) and his sister Marie Osmond:

- Donny & Marie (1976 TV series), a variety show aired from 1976 to 1979
- Donny & Marie (1998 TV series), a talk show aired from 1998 to 2000
- Donny & Marie in Las Vegas, 2008–2019, an entertainment show at several casinos on the Las Vegas Strip

== See also ==
- Donnie or Marie, a 2012 episode of the American television drama series The Killing
- Donny and Marie Osmond discography for a list of recordings by Donny & Marie
