= List of Peabody Award winners (1990–1999) =

The following is a list of Peabody Award winners and honorable mentions from the years 1990 to 1999.

== 1990 ==
Recipient	Area of Excellence
ABC News and Koppel Communications	The Koppel Report: Death of a Dictator, about the trial and execution of Nicolae and Elena Ceaușescu
ABC News/TIME	Peter Jennings Reporting: Guns
American Playhouse Series	Award for American Playhouse's "showcasing [of] quality television" such as Women & Wallace and An Enemy of the People
Red Barber	Personal award for his commentary work on NPR's Morning Edition
Blackside, Inc.	Eyes on the Prize II: America at the Racial Crossroads (1965-1985)
CNN	Institutional Award for the network's coverage of the crisis in the Persian Gulf (Operations Desert Shield and Desert Storm)
CBS Music Video Enterprises and American Masters in Association with Perry Films	John Hammond: From Bessie Smith to Bruce Springsteen, about music producer John Hammond, directed by Hart Perry
Connecticut Public Radio	The Schubert Theatre: 75 Years of Memories, a program produced by Faith Middleton and Diane Orson on the Shubert Theatre (New Haven)
FASE Productions (Foundation for Advancements in Science and Education)	Futures (with Jaime Escalante)
Paul Fine and Holly Fine	Personal awards for their production work at CBS News (in particular the 60 Minutes report "Ward 5A", which profiled AIDS ward nurses at San Francisco General Hospital)
Florentine Films and WETA-TV/Washington, D.C.	The Civil War
John D. and Catherine T. MacArthur Foundation	Institutional Award for its support of "inventive, inspired and important television", recognizing the work of William T. Kirby
KCTS-TV/Seattle, WA and MacNeil/Lehrer NewsHour	"Backhauling," an exposé by Lee Hochberg into truck haulers transporting food products in trucks that had just been used to transport toxic chemicals, produced by Chris Sharp and Lee Hochberg
KPTV/Portland, OR	Mount St. Helens: A Decade Later, reported by Lars Larson
Lynch/Frost Productions in association with Propaganda Films and Worldvision Enterprises	Twin Peaks, for its pilot episode
Worth McDougald	Personal Award on the occasion of McDougald's retirement for his 2+ decades in service to the Peabody Awards as director
Mouchette Films/POV	Days of Waiting: The Life & Art of Estelle Ishigo, a film by Steven Okazaki
Murray Street Enterprise in association with KQED-FM/San Francisco, CA (distributed by NPR)	HEAT with John Hockenberry
National Public Radio	"Manicu's Story: The War in Mozambique," the story of one boy's efforts to reunite with his family in a refugee camp in the war-torn country, produced by Neenah Ellis
NBC	Saturday Night Live
Southern Center for International Studies (aired on PBS)	Institutional Award for "providing a forum for... international decision-makers" to discuss their decisions on national and international policy in programs such as persons at the Southern Center for international Studies in Atlanta for the decision to produce programs such as Annual Reports of the Secretaries of State, Annual Reports of the Secretaries of Defense, and A Conversation with Dean Rusk (hosted by Edwin Newman).
Think Entertainment (as Presented on the Disney Channel)	Mother Goose Rock 'n' Rhyme
Vermont Folklife Center	Journey's End: The Memories and Traditions of Daisy Turner and Family, produced by Ev Grimes
Frederick Wiseman	Personal Award for "a mastery of television documentary", including Near Death and Central Park
WKYC-TV/Cleveland, OH	Dick Feagler Commentaries
WXPN-FM/Philadelphia, PA	Kid's Corner
Young Visions Inc. and The Rotary Club of Los Altos	Rotary and AIDS: The Los Altos Story

== 1991 ==
Recipient	Area of Excellence
ABC News and NHK	Pearl Harbor: Two Hours that Changed the World, anchored by David Brinkley
Armed Forces Radio and Television Service	Institutional Award on the occasion of its 50th anniversary
Brand-Falsey Productions	I'll Fly Away and Northern Exposure
CNN	Award for its coverage of the Soviet coup attempt of 1991
Caedmon Audio (a division of HarperAudio, HarperCollins)	Institutional Award for "preserving our rich oral tradition in poetry, drama, and spoken-word performance"
CBS News	60 Minutes, for the report "Friendly Fire," an examination of a friendly fire incident in the Persian Gulf War and its impact (Steve Kroft, correspondent)
CBS Sports	Coverage of the Masters Tournament, highlighting the work of director Frank Chirkinian (George Veras, producer)
CBS and Shukovsky/English Productions in association with Warner Bros.	Murphy Brown
Central Independent Television (PBS version by WETA-TV/Washington, DC)	Soviets: Red Hot, directed by Juris Podnieks
Peggy Charren	Personal Award for her advocacy of quality children's television programming at Action for Children's Television
The Discovery Channel	People of the Forest: The Chimps of Gombe, directed by Hugo van Lawick
HBO	America Undercover: Heil Hitler! Confessions of a Hitler Youth, produced by Arthur Holch
HBO Sports and Black Canyon Productions	When It Was a Game (Dave Harmon, George Roy, and Steve Stern, producers)
KARK-TV/Little Rock, AR and Arkansas Department of Health	Arkansas' Timebomb: Teen Pregnancy, a public service campaign (Doug Krile, correspondent)
KCRW/Santa Monica, CA	Joe Frank: Work in Progress
KSTP-TV/Saint Paul, MN	"Who's Watching the Store?" an "I-Team" investigation by Joel Grover of Twin Cities retail outlets suspecting minority customers as possible shoplifters
KTLA-TV/Los Angeles, CA	Presentation of the Rodney King beating videotape and subsequent reportage (Stan Chambers, Warren Wilson, Ron Olsen, and Steve Lentz, reporters)
Lucky Duck Productions for MTV Networks	Nickelodeon Special Edition: It's Only Television (Linda Ellerbee, reporter)
NPR's Horizons	The Case Against Women: Sexism in the Courts, produced by Helen Borten
NPR	Coverage of the Judge Clarence Thomas confirmation hearings by Nina Totenberg
NBC News	Reports by Brian Ross on the BCCI scandal
NBC, Carson Productions, and Worldwide Pants	Late Night with David Letterman
WNET/New York, NY	Dance in America: Everybody Dance Now, directed by Margaret Selby and written by Jennifer Dunning
Turner Multimedia	Coup D'État: The Week that Changed the World, a multimedia presentation tool for classrooms on events in the former Soviet Union
WNCN-FM/New York, NY	New York City Musicbox, hosted by Elliott Forrest
WRAL-TV/Raleigh, NC	Award for its environmental reporting, Save Our Sounds
Zouk Productions	The Miles Davis Radio Report, a radio documentary on Miles Davis (Danny Glover, narrator; Quincy Troupe and Jay Allison, producers)

== 1992 ==
Recipient	Area of Excellence
ABC Television and the Carsey-Werner Company	Roseanne
BBC Radio	Institutional Award for the service and the "range, variety and breadth" of its programming
Cable News Network, Atlanta, Georgia	Larry King Live Election Coverage 1992
CBS Television and Granada Television, London, UK	Age Seven in America
CBS, Finnegan-Pinchuk Company, Brand-Falsey Productions	Northern Exposure, for the episode "Cicely" (the show's second win, a rare feat)
Canamedia Productions Ltd., and TV Ontario, Toronto, Canada	Threads of Hope
Nightline (Capital Cities/ABC Inc.)	72 Hours to Victory: Behind the Scenes with Bill Clinton
Capital Cities/ABC, Inc.	ABC News Nightline Special: Moment of Crisis, Anatomy of a Riot
Channel One/Whittle Communications, Los Angeles, California	AIDS
C-SPAN	Institutional Award for the network's daily coverage of the United States Congress and government news
GPN/Nebraska ETV Network	Reading Rainbow, for the episode "The Wall"
Home Box Office and Springcreek Productions, in association with Breakheart Films	Citizen Cohn
HKO Media Inc., and WKBD-TV, Detroit, Michigan	Close to Home: The Tammy Boccomino Story
The Institute of American Indian Arts, Santa Fe, New Mexico, and KNME-TV, Albuquerque, New Mexico	Surviving Columbus
David Isay and NPR	American Folklife Radio Project
KFFA/Helena, AR	King Biscuit Time
KIRO-TV/Seattle, WA	When the Salmon Runs Dry
KJLH/Los Angeles, CA	Coverage of the "Los Angeles Rebellion"
KTTV-TV, Los Angeles	Gavel to Gavel Coverage of the Rodney King Trial
Maysles Films Inc., New York, New York, and Home Box Office	Abortion: Desperate Choices (episode of America Undercover)
MTV Music Television	Choose or Lose
NBC Television	The More You Know
NBC and Castle Rock Entertainment	Seinfeld
NPR and Sylvia Poggioli	Prisoners in Bosnia, correspondent Poggioli's reports from the Bosnian War and the uncovering of "ethnic cleansing" during the Siege of Sarajevo
Propaganda Films and Fox Broadcasting Company	Rock the Vote
Fred Rogers	Personal Award for Rogers' work on children's television, specifically Mister Rogers' Neighborhood
Daniel Schorr	Personal Award for Schorr's NPR commentaries/analyses and previous work at CBS News and CNN
Signifyin' Works, Berkeley, California, and the Public Broadcasting Service	Color Adjustment
WBUR/Boston, MA and NPR	Car Talk
WCVB-TV/Boston, MA	The Incredible Voyage of Bill Pinkney
WGBH-TV/Boston, MA and BBC	The American Experience: The Donner Party, directed by Ric Burns
WGBH-TV, Boston, Massachusetts	The Health Quarterly: The AIDS Report Series
WGBH-TV, Boston, Massachusetts, the BBC, London, UK, and NDR, Hamburg, Germany	The Machine That Changed the World
WQED-TV/Pittsburgh, PA and WGBH-TV/Boston, MA	Where in the World is Carmen Sandiego?
WTVJ-TV/Miami, FL	Hurricane Andrew: As It Happened (citing the work of Bryan Norcross)

== 1993 ==
Recipient	Area of Excellence
ABC News	Day One, for the report "Scarred for Life", which examined the ritual and practice of female circumcision (Sheila MacVicar, correspondent and Forrest Sawyer, host)
ABC Radio News	Award for Jon Bascom's profile of Vietnam War women veterans on the occasion of the unveiling of the Vietnam Women's Memorial
Christiane Amanpour	Personal Award to the CNN correspondent for her "balance and courageous coverage" on critical world events
A.M.L. for The Disney Channel	The Ernest Green Story
BBC Radio 4	"Document: The Unspeakable Atrocity", a self-examination of the BBC's knowledge of Nazi extermination activities during World War II reported by Denys Blakeway
BBC South	The Nineties, for the episode "All Your Kisses are Mine" (directed by Kate Broome), which examined life for unmarried women in the early 20th century
Best Brains Inc., and HBO Downtown Productions for Comedy Central	Mystery Science Theater 3000
CBS News	60 Minutes, for the report "The CIA's Cocaine", (Mike Wallace, senior correspondent) which profiled how a Central Intelligence Agency operation in Venezuela led to a steady stream of cocaine into the United States
Churchill Entertainment for Fox Children's Network	Award for Fox Children's Network's public service campaign, produced by Nicky Noxon, that focus on "the underlying causes of violence in society" in order to provide positive influences on children
Discovery Networks	Institutional Award for its informative and educational programming on The Discovery Channel and The Learning Channel and initiatives such as educator’s guides and interactive video discs
FASE Productions	Good Morning, Miss Toliver
Granada Television and WGBH-TV/Boston, MA	Prime Suspect
Paul Harvey	Personal Award for Harvey's presentations of news and comments on ABC News Radio
HBO and Brillstein-Grey Entertainment	The Larry Sanders Show
HBO and Video Verite Films	I Am a Promise: The Children of Stanton Elementary School
National Public Radio	Award for its coverage on health care reform by Patricia Neighmond
NBC and Baltimore Pictures in association with Reeves Entertainment	Homicide: Life on the Street
NBC News	Award for health and science reports by Robert Bazell
P.O.V. and Silverlake Productions	Silverlake Life: The View From Here
WNET/New York, NY and MTM Enterprises Inc., in association with EuroArts/Brilliant Media	American Masters, for "Paul Simon: Born at the Right Time", directed by Susan Steinberg
Warner Bros. Animation and Amblin Entertainment for Fox Children's Network	Animaniacs
WBZ (AM)/Boston, MA and Kid Company, Inc.	Kid Company
WCVB-TV/Boston, MA	Chuck Kraemer Reporting
WKRN-TV/Nashville, TN	"Under the Influence", a series of investigative reports from Tom Atwood, Stuart Watson, Phil Williams and Anne Holt linking the relationship between lobbyists and elected officials to key legislative votes
WTTW-TV/Chicago, IL and Kurtis Productions, Ltd.	The New Explorers
WHYY-FM/Philadelphia, PA and National Public Radio	Fresh Air with Terry Gross
WVTM-TV/Birmingham, AL	Angels of Change
WWL-TV/New Orleans, LA	"Facing Reality: Politics, Drugs and Waste", an investigation by Bill Elder into drug abuse and sexual misconduct at drug rehab centers
Yorkshire Television and Discovery Channel	Katie and Eilish: Siamese Twins, directed by Mark Galloway

== 1994 ==
Recipient	Area of Excellence
Nickelodeon and Lucky Duck Productions	Nick News with Linda Ellerbee
National Public Radio	"Tobacco Stories", a series of reports on toxic chemical additives used in cigarette production produced by Peggy Girshman and Rob Stein and reported by Richard Harris, Rebecca Perl, Eric Weiner, Daniel Zwerdling and Ira Glass
Lichtenstein Creative Media	Schizophrenia: Voices of an Illness, produced by Bill Lichtenstein and narrated by Jason Robards
National Public Radio and the Smithsonian Institution	Wade in the Water: African American Sacred Music Traditions, produced by Bernice Johnson Reagon
Arnold Shapiro Productions, USAA, and CBS News	Break the Silence: Kids Against Child Abuse
CBS News	CBS Reports: D-Day (reported by Dan Rather)
WVXU-FM/Cincinnati, OH	D-Day + 50 Years, a to-the-minute rebroadcast of news coverage of the Normandy landings on June 6, 1944
WGBH-TV/Boston, MA and the Lennon Documentary Group	The American Experience: The Battle of the Bulge
WGBH-TV/Boston, MA and David Grubin Productions	The American Experience: FDR
WGBH-TV/Boston, MA and ROJA Inc.	The American Experience: Malcolm X: Make It Plain
WRKS-FM/New York, NY	The Rise and Fall of Vee-Jay, produced by Bob Slade and Johnny Meadow
WXXI-FM/Rochester, NY	Fascinatin' Rhythm, hosted by Michael Lasser
ABC News	Primetime Live, for the report "Rush to Read", a report by Diane Sawyer on the misreading of Pap smear tests
ABC News	20/20, for the report "The Hunger Inside", a profile by Lynn Sherr of Peggy Claude-Pierre and her treatment of anorexia patients
KGO-TV/San Francisco, CA	On-location reports by Richard Brown on the upheaval and genocide in Rwanda
KSEE-TV/Fresno, CA	"The Atomic Bombshell", a report by Dale Julin on a nuclear weapons accident near Travis Air Force Base in 1950, its governmental cover-up, and the effects on those nearby
National Film Board of Canada (presented on TVOntario)	Fat Chance
KGAN-TV/Cedar Rapids, IA	"Sewer Solvent Scandal", an "I-Team" investigation reported by Sandy Reisgraf into the dumping of an unsafe chemical solvent into city sewers, and how the chemicals' supplier bribed city officials
KSBW-TV/Salinas, CA and Sedwith Pictures	Just Because: Tales of Violence, Dreams of Peace, produced by Scott Evers and Marc Murai
Discovery Communications	Normandy: The Great Crusade, directed by Christopher Koch
WETA-TV/Washington, DC, and Channel 4, and River Films Production for National Geographic Television	China: Beyond the Clouds, directed by Phil Agland
WTLV/Jacksonville, FL	Buddy Check 12, a public service initiative started by Jeannie Blaylock promoting self-examinations for possible cancers
National Geographic Television	Reflections on Elephants, produced by Dereck and Beverly Joubert
Case TV for Channel 4	Fourways Farm
NBC, Constant c Productions and Amblin Television, in association with Warner Bros. Television	ER
NBC and Grub Street Productions in association with Paramount Television	Frasier
NBC, In Front Productions, and Nuance Productions, in association with TriStar Television Inc.	Mad About You
KQED-TV/San Francisco, CA and Propaganda/Working Title Productions for Channel 4 (airing on American Playhouse)	Tales of the City
MTV Networks	MTV Unplugged
J.E.G. Productions Inc. and HBO	Barbra Streisand in Concert
Turner Original Productions/Varied Directions	Moon Shot

== 1995 ==
Recipient	Area of Excellence
Oscar Brand	Personal Award for his 50th anniversary as host of WNYC's Folksong Festival
Oprah Winfrey	Personal Award for the "multi-talented broadcaster" and her on- and off-air accomplishments
WJR/Detroit, MI	"Blind Justice: Who Killed Janie Fray?" a series of reports revealing a botched murder investigation which led to an innocent man's imprisonment
Canadian Broadcasting Corporation (airing on CBC Radio)	Kevin's Sentence
Minnesota Public Radio	Saint Paul Sunday
National Public Radio and Sony Classical Film and Video for PBS	Wynton Marsalis: Making the Music and Marsalis on Music
WFAA-TV/Dallas, TX	"The Peavy Investigation", a report exploring insurance purchases involving the Dallas Independent School District
Television Broadcasts Ltd.	"50 Years After the War", a profile of Japan's imperialism towards Southeastern Asia during the Pacific War and its legacy
ABC News	Peter Jennings Reporting: Hiroshima - Why the Bomb was Dropped
ABC News 20/20	"Truth on Trial", a report by John Stossel exploring validity of statements by alleged victims of sexual abuse in children's group care settings
ABC News 20/20	"The Journey of Christopher Reeve", a profile by Barbara Walters of the quadriplegic actor and his inspiring message
WXYZ-TV/Detroit, MI	"Target 7: Armed and Angry", an investigative series from reporter Shellee Smith exploring the militia movement in the United States
WCBS-TV/New York, NY	Award for reports from Marcia Kramer uncovering "rampant corruption" within the New York City School system
Kartemquin Educational Films and KTCA-TV/Saint Paul, MN (presented on PBS)	Hoop Dreams
Lauderdale Production for Channel 4 and Cinemax	The Dying Rooms
Public Policy Productions Inc., in association with WNET/New York, NY (presented on PBS)	Road Scholar (directed by Roger Weisberg and starring Andrei Codrescu)
WGBH-TV/Boston, MA and BBC	Rock & Roll
KFOR-TV, KOCO-TV, and KWTV-TV/Oklahoma City, OK	Award to the stations for their coverage of the bombing on the Alfred P. Murrah Federal Building
Discovery Channel and Brian Lapping Associates for BBC	Yugoslavia: Death of a Nation
CBS News	CBS Reports: In the Killing Fields of America (parts 1 and 2)
CBS News	Coverage of the assassination of Yitzhak Rabin
P.O.V. and Deborah Hoffman (presented on PBS)	Complaints of a Dutiful Daughter
Turner Original Productions and BBC Natural History	The Private Life of Plants
Turner Original Productions, Tollin/Robbins, and Mundy Lane, in association with Television Production Partners	Hank Aaron: Chasing the Dream
DeepFocus Productions (presented on PBS)	Coming Out Under Fire
Aardman Animations in association with Wallace & Gromit Ltd., BBC Children's International, BBC Bristol, and BBC Lionheart	Wallace and Gromit
Frontline/WGBH-TV, Boston, Massachusetts	Frontline, for "Waco - The Inside Story" (directed by Michael Kirk)
The Producer's Films for Channel 4	The Politician's Wife
HBO Pictures and Price Entertainment	The Tuskegee Airmen
NBC, Baltimore Pictures, Reeves Entertainment SL/TMF Productions, in association with NBC Productions	Homicide: Life on the Street (the show's second win, a rare feat)
NBC, Barwood Films Ltd., Story Line Productions Inc., and Trillium Productions Inc., in association with TriStar Television	Serving in Silence: The Margarethe Cammermeyer Story
Les Productions Tele-Action Inc., in association with the National Film Board of Canada, Canadian Broadcasting Corporation, and Telefilm Canada (presented on A&E)	The Boys of St. Vincent
CBS and Craig Anderson Productions, Inc., in association with Hallmark Hall of Fame Productions, Inc.	August Wilson's 'The Piano Lesson'

== 1996 ==
Recipient	Area of Excellence
Peter Gzowski	Personal Award for his work on CBC Radio's Morningside
Bud Greenspan	Personal Award for his work in sports documentaries, in particular work related to the Olympics
KOMO-TV/Seattle, WA	Institutional Award for KOMO's "local programming excellence," citing the documentaries War on Children and Earth Agenda
Sound Portrait Productions, Inc. for National Public Radio	Remorse: The 14 Stories of Eric Morse, produced by LeAlan Jones and Lloyd Newman
Radio Smithsonian for Public Radio International	Black Radio: Telling It Like It Was, produced by Jacquie Gales Webb
WBEZ-FM/Chicago, IL	This American Life
American Association for the Advancement of Science	Kinetic City Super Crew
WCVB-TV/Boston, MA	"Who's Guarding the Guardians?" an investigation into lawyers and State of Massachusetts projects taking advantage of the estates of mentally ill citizens
KCET-TV/Los Angeles, CA and BBC	The Great War and the Shaping of the 20th Century
BBC and A&E Television Networks	Pride and Prejudice
BBC and WGBH-TV/Boston, MA	People's Century
BBC and WGBH-TV/Boston, MA	Award for Mobil Masterpiece Theatre, citing House of Cards, To Play the King, and The Final Cut
BBC News	Award for a series of Newsnight reports on the civil war in Afghanistan
Frontline/WGBH-TV (Boston, MA) and Helen Whitney Productions	Frontline: The Choice '96
Frontline/WGBH-TV (Boston, MA), Long Bow Group Inc., and Independent Television Service	Frontline: The Gate of Heavenly Peace
The American Experience, Lennon Documentary Group, and WGBH-TV/Boston, MA	The American Experience: The Battle Over Citizen Kane
NOVA/WGBH-TV (Boston, MA), Agaton Film & Television, Swedish Television/SVT1, ZDF-Arte, and Channel 4	Odyssey of Life, featuring the work of photographer Lennart Nilsson
Telling Pictures, HBO, Channel 4, and ZDF-Arte	The Celluloid Closet
HBO	How Do You Spell God?, a film on children's understanding of religion based on the book by Rabbi Marc Gellman and Monsignor Tom Hartman and directed by Ellen Goosenberg Kent
HBO Sports	Journey of the African-American Athlete
HBO and Creative Thinking International Ltd.	Paradise Lost: The Child Murders at Robin Hood Hills
WNBC-TV/New York, NY	"Passport to Kill", a report exploring how Dominican natives were able to flee justice after committing murders and other crimes in New York
Center for New American Media, Midnight Films, and WETA-TV/Washington, DC	Vote for Me: Politics in America
Turner Entertainment Group and Steven Spielberg in association with Survivors of the Shoah Visual History Foundation	Survivors of the Holocaust, a documentary directed by Allan Holzman
WCCO-TV/Minneapolis, MN	One to One: Mentoring, a public service project aimed at improving youth through mentoring
Carlton Television for Channel 4	Wise Up
ABC and Steven Bochco Productions	NYPD Blue
ABC, Tomlin and Wagner Theatricalz, and Kurtz & Friends	Edith Ann's Christmas - Just Say Noël
NBC and Wolf Films in association with Universal Television	Law & Order
Fox and Gracie Films in association with Twentieth Television	The Simpsons
Fox and Ten Thirteen Productions in association with Twentieth Television	The X-Files

== 1997 ==
Recipient	Area of Excellence
ABC and Sarabande Productions in association with 20th Century Fox Television	Nothing Sacred
ABC and The Black/Marlens Company in association with Touchstone Television	Ellen, for "The Puppy Episode"
ABC News/Nightline	Award for Nightline's 3-part report "The Trial of Pol Pot" by Jim Laurie
Carol Marin	Personal Award for her distinguished investigative work at Chicago's WMAQ-TV and WBBM-TV, as well as her "personal stand against the tide of sensationalism in television news"
Ted Turner	Personal Award for Turner's work as "a true visionary in electronic communications"
Barraclough Carey Productions, Channel 4, and The History Channel	Hello Mr. President, a documentary about Lyndon B. Johnson directed by Philip J Day
New England Cable News	Look for Me Here: 299 Days in the Life of Nora Lenihan, a documentary produced by Florence Del Santo about a woman receiving hospice care
Judith Helfand Productions, P.O.V./The American Documentary and Independent Television Service	A Healthy Baby Girl
KFGO/Fargo, ND	Award for the station's coverage of the Red River Flood ("The Flood of the Century"), with reports by Don Haney, Bonnie Amistadi, Doug Hamilton, Gary Rogers, Sandy Buttweiler, and Ed Schultz
Southern Regional Council	Will the Circle Be Unbroken?, a radio documentary on the Civil rights movement produced by George King
KGO/San Francisco, CA	"State Farm: Good Neighbor or Bad Faith?" an investigation by Susan Kennedy into fraudulent practices by the insurance company involving policyholders' disaster claims
Focus on the Family Radio Theater	Dietrich Bonhoeffer: The Cost of Freedom, a radio drama on Dietrich Bonhoeffer written and directed by Paul McCusker
Murray Street Enterprises and Jazz at Lincoln Center for National Public Radio	Jazz from Lincoln Center
WRAL-TV/Raleigh, NC	"Military Medicine", an exposé by Stuart Watson into the low accountability standards applied to doctors in the United States Armed Forces
The NewsHour with Jim Lehrer	Award for Richard Rodriguez's essays on American life
KQED-TV/San Francisco, CA	The Castro, a documentary about the Castro District, San Francisco directed by Peter L. Stein
KTCA/Twin Cities Public Television in association with Middlemarch Films	Liberty! The American Revolution
WGBH-TV/Boston, MA	The American Experience: The Presidents Series (including Elizabeth Deane's Nixon and The Kennedys, Adriana Bosch's & Austin Hoyt's Eisenhower and Reagan, and David Grubin's FDR TR. LBJ, and Truman).
WGBH-TV/Boston, MA	The American Experience, for "Troublesome Creek - A Midwestern"
WGBH-TV/Boston, MA and BBC	Mobil Masterpiece Theatre, for "The Tenant of Wildfell Hall"
Les Films d'Ici, La Sept-Cinema, and Centre European Cinematographique RhoneAlpes (presented on Bravo and The Independent Film Channel)	In the Land of the Deaf
EuroArts Entertainment OHG & SDR/arte in association with Bravo and Danmarks Radio	Blue Note: A History of Modern Jazz, a documentary directed by Julian Benedikt on Blue Note Records
BBC (presented on The History Channel)	The Nazis: A Warning from History
Florentine Films/Hott Productions and WETA-TV/Washington, DC	Divided Highways: The Interstates and the Transformation of American Life, a documentary on the Interstate Highway System
HBO and Carlton Television in association with the Canadian Broadcasting Corporation	Body Doubles: The Twin Experience, a documentary on twins directed by Antony Thomas
FASE Productions for PBS	The Eddie Files (with Kay Toliver)
Nickelodeon	Award for The Big Help, the network's campaign to promote volunteerism by children
Big Feats! Entertainment	Wishbone
WNET/New York, NY	City Arts
NBC and Fatima Productions	Homicide: Life on the Street, for "the series' sustained excellence," citing in particular the episode "Subway" (the show's third win, a rare feat)
HBO Pictures and The Thomas Carter Company	Don King: Only in America
TNT and a Mark Carliner Production	George Wallace
CBS News	Sunday Morning
CBS News	60 Minutes

== 1998 ==
Recipient	Area of Excellence
Christiane Amanpour	Personal Award for her international reportage work for CNN and CBS News' 60 Minutes
Linda Ellerbee	Personal Award for her work as host and co-executive producer of Nick News
Robert Halmi Sr.	Personal Award for Halmi's work as a producer and as chairman of the board for Hallmark Entertainment, mentioning Gulliver's Travels (1996), The Odyssey (1997), Merlin (1998), Moby Dick (1998), and Alice in Wonderland (1999)
Jac Venza	Personal Award for Venza's "many and ongoing achievements," in particular his founding of National Educational Television and work on Great Performances and American Masters for WNET
National Public Radio	I Must Keep Fightin': The Art of Paul Robeson, produced by Elizabeth Blair and narrated by Barbara Hendricks
National Public Radio	Performance Today, hosted by Martin Goldsmith
National Public Radio and Charlayne Hunter-Gault	Award for Hunter-Gault's reportage from Africa
WHAS/Louisville, KY	"Sisterhood of Hope", a profile by Mary Jeffries of the House of Ruth, which provides support for HIV/AIDS-infected women
CBS News	"The Reckoning", a report on Public Eye with Bryant Gumbel by Carol Marin profiling a man disfigured in a 1979 truck crash and his encounter with the man responsible for the accident
KTVX-TV/Salt Lake City, UT	Award for the station's reports by Chris Vanocur revealing the 2002 Winter Olympic bid scandal
BBC and The Learning Channel	The Human Body
BBC and WGBH-TV/Boston, MA	When Good Men Do Nothing, a report by Steve Bradshaw that originally aired on BBC's Panorama that revealed the United Nations' downplaying of the Rwandan genocide (adapted for the United States as The Triumph of Evil on Frontline)
WGBH-TV/Boston, MA (presented on PBS)	Africans in America: America's Journey Through Slavery (Orlando Bagwell, executive producer)
WGBH/Frontline, Washington Media Associates, and Public Affairs Television (presented on PBS)	Frontline, for the report "Washington's Other Scandal" by Bill Moyers, which documented "the corrupting influence of fund raising in the electoral process" (Sherry Jones, producer)
WGBH Educational Foundation, The American History Project/Out of the Blue Productions Inc., and The American Experience	The American Experience: Riding the Rails, produced by Lexy Lovell and Michael Uys
The American Experience, David Grubin Productions Inc., and WGBH Educational Foundation	The American Experience: America 1900
KRON-TV/San Francisco, CA	"About Race", a series of reports by Pete Wilson and Pam Moore (produced by Craig Franklin) exploring racial understanding
ITVS and City People Productions (presented on PBS)	Travis, a documentary about a child with AIDS directed by Richard Kotuk
WETA-TV/Washington, DC and Florentine Films (presented on PBS)	Frank Lloyd Wright
WNET/New York, NY, Florentine Films, and Sherman Pictures	American Masters: Alexander Calder
CNN and Jeremy Isaacs Productions	Cold War
NBC News	Dateline NBC, for the report "Checks and Balances" by Maria Shriver, which profiled welfare-to-work efforts in Wisconsin and its effects on a quartet of single mothers
WANE-TV/Fort Wayne, IN	"Christopher", a look by Karen Hensel at the organ donation process from the donor's death to the recipient's recovery
TVC London and Channel 4	The Bear
Comedy Central, Tom Snyder Productions Inc., Popular Arts Entertainment, and HBO Downtown Productions	Dr. Katz, Professional Therapist
HBO	Shot Through the Heart
HBO and Brillstein-Grey Entertainment	The Larry Sanders Show, for the episode "Flip" (the show's second win, a rare feat)
HBO Sports	Award for HBO's series of sports documentaries, highlighting When It Was a Game, Babe Ruth, Sugar Ray Robinson: The Bright Lights and Dark Shadows of a Champion, Where Have You Gone, Joe DiMaggio?, and a documentary on Sonny Liston and the guidance of Seth Abraham and Ross Greenburg
Chestermead Productions for BBC and WGBH-TV/Boston, MA (presented on PBS)	Mobil Masterpiece Theatre, for its production of King Lear (originally aired on Performance)
Showtime Networks Inc., Pacific Motion Pictures, and Egg Pictures	The Baby Dance
Fox and David E. Kelley Productions	Ally McBeal
ABC and David E. Kelley Productions	The Practice
ABC and Steven Bochco Productions	NYPD Blue, for the episode "Raging Bulls"

== 1999 ==
Recipient	Area of Excellence
ABC News	ABC 2000 Today
ABC News	20/20, for the report "Those Were Our Children," a report by Brian Ross which connected a fatal car/truck accident in Wisconsin to a bribe-for-license scandal within the Office of the Illinois Secretary of State
ABC, Storyline Entertainment, Columbia TriStar Television Inc., and Chris Montan Productions in association with Walt Disney Television	Annie
BBC in association with PBS	The Life of Birds by David Attenborough
BBC News	"Murder in Purdah", a report by Olenka Frenkiel on the torture and killing of women in Pakistan
Blackside Inc., in association with WNET/New York, NY (presented on PBS)	I'll Make Me a World: A Century of African-American Arts
Brook Lapping Productions for Channel 4 (presented on PBS' The American Experience	Playing the China Card (Nixon's China Game)
C-SPAN	American Presidents: Life Portraits
Bob Simon	Personal Award to the CBS News correspondent for his international reports on 60 Minutes and 60 Minutes II
CBS, Televest, and Columbia TriStar Television in association with Cosby & James Productions	Having Our Say: The Delaney Sisters' First 100 Years
ESPN	SportsCentury
Florentine Films in association with WETA-TV/Washington, DC (presented on PBS)	Not for Ourselves Alone: The Story of Elizabeth Cady Stanton & Susan B. Anthony
Frontline co-production with 10/20 Productions (presented on PBS)	Frontline, for "The Lost Children of Rockdale County", directed by Rachel Dretzin and Barak Goodman and which profiled "drifting" kids in suburban Atlanta, Georgia
GMA Network	Award for investigative reporting, citing the reports "I-Witness: Kidneys for Sale", "Kamao", and "Brigada Siete: Child Labor"
HBO	Goodnight Moon & Other Sleepytime Tales
HBO and Brillstein-Grey Entertainment	The Sopranos
HBO and Spanky Pictures in association with Ellen M. Krass Productions	A Lesson Before Dying
HBO Sports	Dare to Compete: The Struggle of Women in Sports, a documentary on women's sports produced by Kendall Bridges Reid
HBO Sports in association with Black Canyon Productions	Fists of Freedom: The Story of the '68 Summer Games, a documentary on the 1968 Summer Olympics directed by George Roy
Mentorn Barraclough Carey Production for Channel 4	The Valley, a documentary on the Kosovo War directed by Dan Reed
MTV Networks	BIOrhythm, a documentary biography series
National Public Radio	Morning Edition with Bob Edwards
National Public Radio and The Kitchen Sisters	Lost & Found Sound
NBC and John Wells Productions in association with Warner Bros. Television	The West Wing
Sheila Nevins	Personal Award for her work at HBO
Public Affairs Television and WNET/New York, NY	Facing the Truth with Bill Moyers
Riverside Films (presented on PBS)	Arguing the World
Showtime and Haft Entertainment	Strange Justice
Ostroushko Productions, produced for Smithsonian Productions (distributed by Public Radio International)	The Mississippi: River of Song
WNET/New York, NY	City Life, a local documentary series on life in New York City
TWI/Carlton co-production for ITV and The History Channel	The Second World War in Colour (History Alive: World War II in Color), a documentary on World War II produced by Stewart Binns using contemporary color footage
VH1 Public Affairs and MTV Networks	VH1 Save the Music Campaign
WAGA-TV/Atlanta, GA	"Singled Out," an investigation by Dale Russell into the targeting of minorities for pat-downs by US Customs inspectors at airport security checkpoints
Wall to Wall Television Ltd., BBC, and Carlton Television, and WGBH-TV/Boston, MA	ExxonMobil Masterpiece Theatre: A Rather English Marriage
WCPO-TV/Cincinnati, OH	"I-Team" investigations by Laure Quinlivan into the construction projects for stadiums for the Cincinnati Bengals and Reds
Yorkshire Television Production and WGBH-TV/Boston, MA	ExxonMobil Masterpiece Theatre: Lost for Words

== Notes ==
1.Nightline's 1997 award for "The Trial of Pol Pot" was offered in part to Nate Thayer, who found Pol Pot and filmed his trial. Thayer declined the Peabody (the first to ever do so) as he did not want to share it with ABC News, whom he believed acted unethically when using his footage for pre-broadcast publicity.
