= List of Less Than Kind episodes =

Less Than Kind is a comedy-drama produced by Mark McKinney that previously aired on Citytv and currently is shown on HBO Canada. The show is set in Winnipeg, and stars Jesse Camacho as Sheldon Blecher, an overweight teenager struggling with a highly dysfunctional, but lovable, family. Other members of the Blecher family include Sheldon's father Sam, a failing driving instructor, played by Maury Chaykin, mother Anne, a closeted pyromaniac, played by Wendel Meldrum, and brother Josh, an actor with delusions of grandeur, played by Benjamin Arthur.

The theme song for the show is "One Great City!" by Canadian indie rock band The Weakerthans.

== Series overview ==
Season	Episodes	Originally released		
Season	Episodes	First released	Last released	Network
1	13	October 13, 2008	February 2, 2009	Citytv
2	13	February 19, 2010	May 21, 2010	HBO Canada
3	13	January 15, 2012	March 25, 2012	HBO Canada
4	9	June 2, 2013	July 14, 2013	HBO Canada

== Episodes ==
=== Season 1 (2008–09) ===
No. overall	No. in season	Title	Directed by	Written by	Original release date
1	1	"To Be a Man"	Shawn Alex Thompson	Marvin Kaye & Chris Sheasgreen	October 13, 2008
Sheldon Blecher celebrates his Bar Mitzvah two years late, at 15, and comes to terms with being the most adult member of his family.
2	2	"Top of the Class"	Shawn Alex Thompson	Marvin Kaye & Chris Sheasgreen	October 20, 2008
Sheldon competes to become captain of the school's Top of the Class team, while Sam convinces Josh to work with him as a driving instructor for the day.
3	3	"French Is My Kryptonite"	Shawn Alex Thompson	Marvin Kaye & Chris Sheasgreen	October 27, 2008
Sheldon discovers that French, his worst subject, is key to Top of the Class competitions, and becomes friends with his braces-wearing French tutor, Miriam (Brooke Palsson). Sam and Anne undergo a tax audit.
4	4	"The Shel Game"	Henry Sarwer-Foner	Mark McKinney	November 3, 2008
Sam's cars are repossessed, disrupting his driving school business. Sheldon leaves his crush Imelda's (Emma Bambrick) science project in one of the cars before it gets impounded, and has to retrieve it.
5	5	"Note Perfect"	James Dunnison	Garry Campbell	November 10, 2008
Sheldon attempts to get out of gym class by getting a note from his doctor stating that he's too obese for physical activity, but the effort backfires when he discovers that his "condition" will prevent him from going on a ski trip with his crush, Imelda. Anne is upset with Sam, who is unable to believe that she didn't set both the Temple and their loan officer's car on fire.
6	6	"Insomnia"	James Dunnison	Jenn Engels	November 17, 2008
Sheldon is unable to sleep the night before his first Top of the Class competition, and drinks a large number of energy drinks despite his trouble with caffeine. Sam and Anne face a review for a suspicious number of students who pass their driving tests.
7	7	"Pakikisama"	Henry Sarwer-Foner	Marvin Kaye & Chris Sheasgreen	November 24, 2008
A mortified Sheldon apologises to Imelda and attempts to make amends to her father. Sam looks for a way to keep his business running, and Clara (Nancy Sorel) discovers the business badly needs a bookkeeper.
8	8	"Balls"	Kelly Makin	Marvin Kaye & Chris Sheasgreen	December 1, 2008
Sheldon convinces Imelda to break up with her boyfriend. Josh auditions for a play. Tensions erupt between Clara and Sam over their new business arrangement.
9	9	"The Daters"	Kelly Makin	Garry Campbell	December 8, 2008
Sheldon and Miriam decide to go on a date. A power struggle develops between Anne and Josh's new girlfriend, Shandra, while she's temporarily staying with the Blecher family. Sheldon's teacher Mr. Lubbe takes driving lessons.
10	10	"Husky Boy"	James Dunnison	Rob Sheridan	January 12, 2009
Sheldon and Anne go shopping at a sadistic store for overweight kids, where Anne gets banned for life. Josh is forced to return to a Winnipeg-based talent agent. Sam gets his day of reckoning.
11	11	"FUN"	James Dunnison	Jenn Engels	January 19, 2009
Josh and Shandra reluctantly sacrifice a day of LARP-ing to supervise Sheldon and his TOP OF THE CLASS team mates. Clara invites Sam and Anne to an art gallery opening for their 27th wedding anniversary.
12	12	"Career's Day"	Kelly Makin	Mark McKinney	January 26, 2009
Sheldon ropes Sam into participating in careers night at school. Miriam exhibits some strange behaviour. Josh gets a job as a standardized patient.
13	13	"Happy Birthday Sheldon"	Kelly Makin	Marvin Kaye & Chris Sheasgreen	February 2, 2009
Imelda ditches Sheldon on his birthday. Josh gets a job on a movie set. Anne tries to get Sam to go on a diet after a visit to the doctor.

=== Season 2 (2010) ===
No. overall	No. in season	Title	Directed by	Written by	Original release date
14	1	"Third Death's a Charm"	Kelly Makin	Marvin Kaye and Chris Sheasgreen	February 19, 2010
Sheldon Blecher and his anxious family stand vigil at the hospital as Sam Blecher knocks repeatedly at death's door. Dave Foley guest stars as Dr Sheasgreen – a seemingly empathetic doctor who might be a little too eager to see Sam crossover.
15	2	"Terminus Ad Quem"	Bruce McDonald	Marvin Kaye & Chris Sheasgreen	February 26, 2010
Anne grows suspicious of Sam when he gets an early release from the hospital. Sheldon begrudgingly chaperones a surly Miriam to a dinner with her mother and her new lesbian lover. Josh struggles to master crying for an important audition.
16	3	"I Am Somewhere"	Kelly Makin	Mark McKinney	March 5, 2010
Aunt Clara and the family try to ignore Anne's growing penchant for medicating her stress with Josh's pot. School takes a dark turn for Sheldon and Miriam with the arrival of a feral new student, Danny Lubbe. Tito tries to help Josh replenish his stash.
17	4	"Something Better"	Bruce McDonald	Mark McKinney	March 12, 2010
Miriam grows jealous when Sheldon is smitten by the model in their 'life drawing' art class. Danny tries to de-rail his father's attempts to rekindle a flame with the art teacher Ms. Cornish. Anne tries to helps an elderly man, Artie Rosen deal with his dying pet rabbit.
18	5	"Party People"	Bruce McDonald	Garry Campbell	March 19, 2010
On another listless Saturday, Danny challenges the sheltered Sheldon and Miriam to go to a party. Josh's patience is pushed to the limit when he takes Danny out for a driving lesson. After Clara encounters an old flame and his new girlfriend her depression leaves her vulnerable to the unseemly charms of a police officer.
19	6	"Fasto Loves Lebso"	Bruce McDonald	Jenn Engels	March 26, 2010
Sheldon and Danny scheme for solutions after a dyslexic girl bully, accuses Miriam of being a lesbian. Josh enlists Tito's help to find an apartment after Shandra corners him into setting up house with her. Mr. Lubbe desperately seeks parenting advice from Anne and Lorne Goldstein.
20	7	"That's Somebody's Knish"	James Dunnison	Marvin Kaye	April 9, 2010
Sheldon and Miriam realize they are in love. Misreading Sheldon's distraction as drug addiction, Anne aims to scare him straight. Josh and Shandra host the family at a tense house-warming dinner. Spurred by an awkward incident at Artie's, Clara confronts her relationship with Kyle.
21	8	"Road Trip"	James Dunnison	Garry Campbell	April 16, 2010
Shandra breaks up with Josh when Anne fires him from the driving school. A subsequent road trip to Artie's storage locker turns frightening when Clara, Sheldon, Artie and Josh run into two exiled bikers who are guarding the facility as punishment for an unspecified transgression. Meanwhile, at the Blecher house, Miriam is caught in the middle as Anne and Shandra finally confront their differences.
22	9	"Coming Home"	Douglas Mitchell	Chris Sheasgreen	April 23, 2010
Clara frantically searches for Artie's estranged son in order to unload an inheritance that's attracting unwelcome attention from Revenue Canada. When a depressed and invalid Sam is released from hospital a day early, he takes a meandering tour of Winnipeg until an unexpected encounter with a young teen restores his spirits. Dropped from the school band, Sheldon, Miriam and Danny find themselves irritable and at loose ends.
23	10	"First Nighters"	James Dunnison	Garry Campbell	April 30, 2010
A preoccupied Miriam surprises Sheldon with a forceful suggestion they take their relationship to the next level. Sam convinces Anne to flout the anniversary "curse" of their first date with a fancy dinner out. Josh surprises Shandra with an unwelcome birthday gift.
24	11	"Spring Break"	James Dunnison	Jenn Engels	May 7, 2010
Miriam strong-arms a reluctant Sheldon into attending the teen riot known as the Spring Break Party. Twenty years too late, Sam and Anne try to discipline Josh by grounding him after he blows off a lesson. David confesses his weaknesses to Clara when a thank-you dinner with her triggers one of his addictions.
25	12	"Showtime"	Kelly Makin	Jenn Engels	May 14, 2010
Danny spoils the fun when he forces Sheldon and Miriam to take their secret band public. Josh discovers Thunder Bay O.P.P. has an underground fan following when he runs into his old co-star and acting buddy Eric. Sam accidentally throws David Rosen's gambling addiction into overdrive.
26	13	"The Deluge"	Kelly Makin	Garry Campbell & Jennifer Beasley	May 21, 2010
Sheldon fears he is losing Miriam's affection to an attractive fellow student – the school guitar prodigy named Paul. Meanwhile, with his basement already flooding, a tightly-wound Sam has a bizarre reaction when Clara confesses to embezzlement. With Eric rekindling Josh's acting ambition, Shandra confronts him about their relationship.

=== Season 3 (2012) ===
No. overall	No. in season	Title	Directed by	Written by	Original release date
27	1	"Fugue State"	Kelly Makin	Mark McKinney	January 15, 2012
Anne can't deal with a horrifying late night discovery. Sheldon anxiously awaits Miriam's return from Europe. Clara uncovers Josh and Shandra's secret plan to escape to Los Angeles.
28	2	"Play It Again, Sam"	Kelly Makin	Mark McKinney	January 15, 2012
Sam's funeral brings Sheldon face-to-face when Rabbi Rabinowitz delivers a half-hearted eulogy. Clara's ex-husband Jack makes a surprise visit to pay his respects. An exiled Shandra attempts to support the living daylights out of Josh. Anne is numb as Shiva begins at the Blecher house.
29	3	"I'm Still Me"	Kelly Makin	Karen Hill	January 15, 2012
With Anne lost to an ever more debauched Shiva, Clara must struggle with a big decision about the future of the driving school alone. Josh needs sex to keep away the sad. Sheldon learns the truth about Miriam's adventures abroad when Danny unwittingly drops some clues.
30	4	"Coming Around"	James Dunnison	Brian Hartt	January 22, 2012
When Danny tries to reconcile Sheldon to Miriam, Sheldon's over the top apology makes things worse. Josh's attempts to become the man of the house is undermined when he nearly kills a driving school student. An accidental meeting empowers a desperate Clara to blackmail her ex-husband Jack.
31	5	"Reparations and Renewal"	James Dunnison	Jenn Engels	January 29, 2012
Anne discovers that Clara's extortion of her ex-husband Jack has led her down an even darker road. Sheldon persuades a terrified Mr. Lubbe to let Danny try another driving test. Josh's reunion with his former co-star Eric leads them both to an exciting opportunity.
32	6	"Lawyers and Cougars and Bankers, Oh My!"	James Dunnison	Marvin Kaye & Chris Sheasgreen	February 5, 2012
Sheldon, Danny and Miriam are reluctantly obliged to face parental passion when Miriam discovers a woman sneaking out of her father's bedroom. Josh and Eric struggle to finance their Acting Academy of Acting Excellence. Anne's discomfort in being the traditional widow leads her to crash Sam's old poker game.
33	7	"Delirium"	Bruce McDonald	Marvin Kaye & Chris Sheasgreen	February 12, 2012
A surprising goodnight kiss with Miriam makes Sheldon hopeful for a renewed relationship. But then Josh is last man standing when Sheldon, Anne and Clara fall to a vicious flu bug. Danny must come up with a plan to get out of a school project.
34	8	"Danger, Wrestling!"	Bruce McDonald	Denis McGrath	February 19, 2012
Josh and Eric struggle to find students worthy of the Academy of Acting Excellence. Anne is visited by an old family friend, with an offer to buy Blecher's Driving School. Danny's plan to re-unite 'Derrick Sux Ass' is thwarted by the growing rift between Sheldon and Miriam.
35	9	"The Fwomp"	Bruce McDonald	Garry Campbell	February 26, 2012
Josh and Eric discover a young prodigy in the Academy of Acting Excellence. Sheldon is recruited by the wrestling team despite Danny's disdain. Inconvenient desires begin to trouble Anne. A jilted Clara finds a sympathetic ear in Shandra.
36	10	"Jerk Chicken"	James Dunnison	Kim Coghill	March 4, 2012
Sheldon hosts the victory celebration for the wrestling team and Tina becomes his girlfriend. Josh is forced into being a reluctant chaperon by a frightened Anne. Danny and Miriam crash the party.
37	11	"The Promise Bone"	Gary Yates	Marvin Kaye & Chris Sheasgreen	March 11, 2012
When Anne and Clara decide to sell the school they find Jim Sheridan's buyout offer is hard to revive. Josh and Eric land an audition for the acting prodigy. When Danny goes missing, Sheldon and Miriam wish they could turn the clock back.
38	12	"Not Weird or Awkward, Just Awesome"	Douglas Mitchell	Marvin Kaye & Chris Sheasgreen	March 18, 2012
Sheldon, Miriam and Mr. Lubbe make a disturbing discovery about Danny's whereabouts. When Anne confronts Jim Sheridan the driving school becomes the subject of a suspiciously timed inspection. Josh confronts Shandra at work.
39	13	"March Fourth"	Mark McKinney	Mark McKinney & Garry Campbell	March 25, 2012
With Danny and Miriam upset by the prospect of separating for university, Sheldon comes up with a inspired solve. Anne, Jim and Clara risk it all to save the driving school from the rival 'Killigans'. Shandra is furious when the family seem oblivious to the implications of her renewed romance with Josh.

=== Season 4 (2013) ===
No. overall	No. in season	Title	Directed by	Written by	Original release date
40	1	"I'm Only Nineteen"	James Dunnison	Marvin Kaye & Chris Sheasgreen	June 2, 2013
The triumph of Sheldon's graduation morphs into a summer of love, parties and independence. Anne's empty nest anxiety leads to a tryst that is more than she bargained for. Josh and Shandra blow the budget shopping for a first home.
41	2	"Female Trouble"	James Dunnison	Marvin Kaye & Chris Sheasgreen	June 2, 2013
A fight with Anne forces Clara to sort through the jumbled feelings left by a pregnancy scare alone. Anne is startled to learn Jim has feelings for her. Sheldon & Miriam reluctantly turn to stepmom Lisa with an 'intimate' problem.
42	3	"Liars"	Mark McKinney	Mark McKinney	June 9, 2013
Their cherished European adventure is threatened when Sheldon, Danny and Miriam are fired and must find new jobs. Josh's triumph at a work meeting is spoiled by a run in with former best friend Eric. Anne & Clara uncover an affair.
43	4	"Best Men"	Marvin Kaye & Chris Sheasgreen	Garry Campbell	June 16, 2013
Josh and Shandra hatch a hasty wedding to save their house. Sheldon organizes a last minute bachelor party for his brother while dealing with an extremely stressed Miriam. Lubbe shares surprising news with Danny. Jim saves the day.
44	5	"Something Blue"	Doug Mitchell	Karen Hill	June 23, 2013
Josh forces Sheldon into a secret trip to Toronto to save his marriage. Tears are shed when Shandra's penny-pinching drives Anne to the brink. After an exhausting day at Jack's and a fight with Sheldon, Miriam makes a big mistake.
45	6	"Space Box"	Mark McKinney	Marvin Kaye & Chris Sheasgreen	June 30, 2013
After she and Jim get lost, Anne is furious to discover no one in the family noticed her absence. Eric offers hope when Josh collapses into despair. Jack deepens Miriam's confusion. Sheldon confronts Danny about his shady job.
46	7	"Before The End Begins"	Kelly Makin	Mark McKinney & Garry Campbell	July 7, 2013
After driving a wedge between Anne and Jim, a resentful Clara must finally face herself. On the eve of their trip, Sheldon realizes something is amiss with his friends. Josh and Eric cut corners to deal with their 23-hour workdays.
47	8	"Fight and Flight - Part 1"	Unknown	Unknown	July 14, 2013
Danny confirms fears about Miriam. Sheldon's emotional binge lands him at Jim's door. Anne mistakes Jim's return for a romantic overture. Josh needs Shandra to save him from delirious Eric. Danny blames Sheldon for Uzzie's troubles. To be continued...
48	9	"Fight and Flight - Part 2"	Unknown	Unknown	July 14, 2013
With Miriam's secret exposed, Sheldon enlists family to help set his friends right even as his own secret deadline looms. Josh is unemployed when his flame out on live radio entertains the hosts but infuriates his boss.
