= We Interrupt This Program (disambiguation) =

"We Interrupt This Program" is the fourth episode of the 2021 American television miniseries WandaVision.

We Interrupt This Program (or Programme) may also refer to:

== Television ==
- "We Interrupt This Program", an episode of the 1998 miniseries From the Earth to the Moon
- "We Interrupt This Program", a 1997 episode of the 1990 American TV series Beverly Hills, 90210
- "We Interrupt This Program", a 2017 episode of the 2014 American TV series Z Nation

== Music ==
- "We Interrupt This Programme" (song), a 2005 song by British electronic band Coburn
- "We Interrupt This Program - News Medley", a track from the 1985 compilation album Television's Greatest Hits: 65 TV Themes! From the 50's and 60's

== Other uses ==
- We Interrupt This Program... (play), a 1975 play by Norman Krasna

== See also ==
- We Interrupt This Broadcast, 1998 non-fiction book by Joe Garner
- We Interrupt This Broadcast (TV series), a 2023 Australian comedy series
- Interrupt This Program, a 2015 Canadian documentary series
- Breaking news, often accompanied by this phrase
- Emergency Broadcast System, an emergency warning system which began with this phrase
