= Steven Hilliard Stern =

Canadian television and documentary director, producer and writer

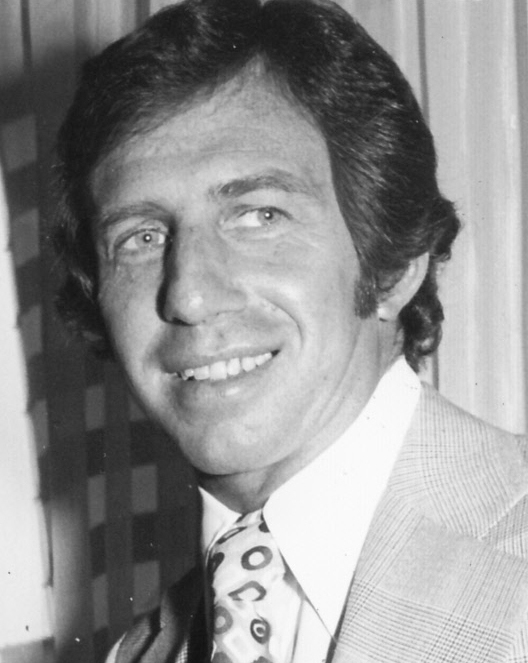
- Stern in 1972
- Born: November 1, 1937; Timmins, Ontario, Canada
- Died: June 27, 2018 (aged 80); Encino, California, U.S.
- Occupations: Film director, screenwriter, television producer

Steven Hilliard Stern (November 1, 1937 – June 27, 2018) was a Canadian television and documentary director, producer and writer.

== Biography ==
Stern attended Ryerson Institute of Technology and served in the Canadian Infantry before inaugurating his directing career. He began his career in advertising, writing and directing radio and TV commercials, then moved to Los Angeles in the 1960s where he wrote for the ABC variety show, The Hollywood Palace.

The bulk of Stern's output was in the field of made-for-TV movies, both in the United States and Canada, focusing on women's issues, noir thriller, action/adventure and occasionally, sports. Some film credits may appear as Steve Stern and Steven H. Stern rather than the full middle name.

Stern died in Encino, California, on June 27, 2018, age 80.

== Filmography ==
- 1971: B.S. I Love You
- 1972: Lo B'Yom V'Lo B'Layla
- 1974: Harrad Summer
- 1975: I Wonder Who's Killing Her Now?
- 1977: Escape from Bogen County
- 1978: The Ghost of Flight 401
- 1978: Doctors' Private Lives
- 1978: Getting Married
- 1979: Fast Friends
- 1979: Anatomy of a Seduction
- 1979: Young Love, First Love
- 1979: Running
- 1980: Portrait of an Escort
- 1981: Miracle on Ice
- 1981: The Devil and Max Devlin
- 1981: A Small Killing
- 1982: The Ambush Murders
- 1982: Portrait of a Showgirl
- 1982: Not Just Another Affair
- 1982: Forbidden Love
- 1982: Mazes and Monsters
- 1983: Baby Sister
- 1983: Still the Beaver
- 1983: An Uncommon Love
- 1984: Draw!
- 1984: Getting Physical
- 1984: Obsessive Love
- 1985: The Undergrads (as Steven H. Stern)
- 1985: Murder in Space
- 1985: Hostage Flight
- 1986: The Park Is Mine
- 1986: Young Again
- 1986: Many Happy Returns
- 1987: Not Quite Human (as Steven H. Stern)
- 1987: Rolling Vengeance
- 1988: Man Against the Mob
- 1988: Weekend War
- 1988: Crossing the Mob
- 1989: Final Notice (as Steven H. Stern)
- 1990: Personals
- 1991: Money
- 1991: Love & Murder
- 1992: The Women of Windsor
- 1993: Morning Glory
- 1994: To Save the Children (as Steven Stern)
- 1995: Black Fox (as Steven H. Stern)
- 1995: Black Fox: The Price of Peace (as Steven H. Stern)
- 1995: The Silence of Adultery
- 1995: Black Fox: Good Men and Bad (as Steven H. Stern)
- 1997: Breaking the Surface: The Greg Louganis Story
- 1998: City Dump: The Story of the 1951 CCNY Basketball Scandal (as Steve Stern, co-directed with George Roy)
- 2002: :03 from Gold (uncredited)

== Television series ==
- 1976: Serpico (unknown number of episodes)
- 1976: Bonnie and McCloud (TV episode)
- 1976: McCloud (1 episode)
- 1976: Who's Who in Neverland
- 1976-1977: Quincy M.E. (2 episodes)
  - a.k.a. "Quincy" (International: English informal title)
- 1977: Dog and Cat (unknown number of episodes)
- 1977: Has Anybody Here Seen Quincy? (TV episode)
- 1977: Wipe-Out (TV episode)
- 1977: The Hardy Boys / Nancy Drew Mysteries (1 episode)
  - a.k.a. The Nancy Drew Mysteries (USA: short title)
- 1977: Half LIfe (1 episode)
- 1977: Logan's Run (1 episode)
- 1977: Deep Cover (TV episode)
- 1977: Hawaii Five-O (1 episode)
  - a.k.a. McGarrett (USA: rerun title)
- 1981: Jessica Novak (1 episode)
- 1981: Closeup News (TV episode)
- 1998: Voices (TV episode)
- 1998: The Crow: Stairway to Heaven (1 episode)
- 1999: The Dream Team

== Awards and nominations ==
- In 1980, he was nominated for a Genie Award for "Best Original Screenplay" for Running

== See also ==
- CCNY point shaving scandal
