= City Dump: The Story of the 1951 CCNY Basketball Scandal =

- Directed by: George Roy; Steven Hilliard Stern
- Production company: Black Canyon Productions
- Distributed by: HBO
- Release date: March 1998
- Running time: 60 minutes
- Country: United States
- Language: English

City Dump: The Story of the 1951 CCNY Basketball Scandal is a 1998 American documentary film about the City College of New York basketball point-shaving scandal. It was produced by George Roy and Steven Hilliard Stern. It was made for HBO.

== Background ==
Jews and blacks composed the CCNY team and their coach was Nat Holman. The team was found guilty of point-shaving; gamblers would pay money for players to lose points or not play as well as was expected. The revelation of the CCNY point-shaving scandal led to other scandals: other basketball teams were caught point-shaving around the country.

== Production ==
Black Canyon Productions produced the film with multiple players, broadcasters, and alumni of the college being interviewed. The content was compiled by Ross Greenburg who was HBO Sports' senior vice president and executive producer. The film opens with a statement from Burt Young and is narrated by Liev Schreiber. Game play footage is included in the documentary. None of the six then-living CCNY players wanted to be interviewed. The film did not portray the players in a disparaging way, but how they were influenced by the complexity of the corruption. The film shows the background of the multicultural team and its successes as well. It premiered in 1998 on HBO during March Madness as an hour-long documentary.

== Reception ==
Tex Cox of The Daily Herald wrote, "City Dump: The Story of the 1951 CCNY Basketball Scandal might just be the most beautiful sports documentary I've ever seen." Ed Bark, writing for the Sun-Sentinel said the film "is a lush filmic swish, even if some of its narrative gets gaudier than a Dennis Rodman dye job."

Daniel A. Nathan gave a mixed review for The Journal of American History, saying that "City Dump glosses over and simplifies too much" and concluding with "City Dump debunks the popular notion that the 1950s was a time of wholesomeness, integrity, and traditional values."

== Selected cast ==
- Burt Young as himself - opening narration
- Liev Schreiber as himself - narrator
- Maury Allen as himself
- Dave Anderson as himself
- Marty Glickman as himself
- Marvin Kalb as himself
- Al McGuire as himself
- Sidney Zion as himself
- Junius Kellogg as himself (also shown in archived footage)

== See also ==
- List of basketball films
