= Working the Engels =

Canadian-American sitcom television series

- Genre: Sitcom
- Created by: Katie Ford; Jane Ford
- Starring: Andrea Martin; Kacey Rohl; Azura Skye; Benjamin Arthur
- Opening theme: Odds Are by Barenaked Ladies
- Countries of origin: Canada; United States
- No. of seasons: 1
- No. of episodes: 12

Production
- Executive producers: Katie Ford; Jane Ford; Howard Busgang; Tom Nursall; Noreen Halpern
- Production company: Halfire-CORE Entertainment

Original release
- Network: Global; NBC
- Release: March 12 – August 7, 2014

Working the Engels is a Canadian-American sitcom that premiered on Global on March 12, 2014, and was also a part of NBC's summer schedule, having premiered on July 10, 2014. Produced by Halfire-CORE Entertainment, it marked the first time that U.S. and Canadian broadcasters had collaborated in producing a half-hour network sitcom.

The show stars Kacey Rohl as Jenna Engel, a daughter trying to keep her father's law firm running to support her family. The cast also includes Andrea Martin, Azura Skye and Benjamin Arthur.

The series was created and written by Katie Ford and Jane Ford.

While all 12 episodes aired in Canada, only the first five episodes aired in the U.S. On August 20, 2014, NBC announced that the show had been canceled, and that it had pulled the remaining episodes from the schedule.

== Cast ==
- Andrea Martin as Ceil Engel
- Kacey Rohl as Jenna Engel
- Azura Skye as Sandy Engel-Karinsky
- Benjamin Arthur as Jimmy Engel

=== Recurring ===
- Colin Mochrie as Miles
- Jennifer Irwin as Charisse
- Martin Short as Charles "Chuck" Pastry
- Gregory Smith as Johnny
- Eugene Levy as Arthur Horowitz

== Episodes ==
| No. | Title | Directed by | Written by | Canadian air date | U.S. air date | U.S. viewers (millions) |
|---|---|---|---|---|---|---|
| 1 | "Pilot" | Mel Damski | Katie Ford & Jane Cooper Ford | March 12, 2014 | July 10, 2014 | 2.73 |
Upon hearing from family lawyer Miles that her recently deceased husband has left her with a $200,000 debt, Ceil Engel considers jumping off a roof to her death. After changing her mind, she falls off the roof anyway, injuring herself. She is visited at the hospital by her children: recovering addict Sandy, ne'er-do-well son Jimmy, and frustrated associate attorney Jenna. When she learns of the family's money problems, Jenna makes the decision to quit her job and restart her father's legal practice, reluctantly employing the assistance of her mom and siblings.
| 2 | "Maid Amends" | Keith Samples | Katie Ford & Jane Cooper Ford | March 19, 2014 | July 17, 2014 | 2.01 |
Jenna takes the case of a maid who says she was fired by her female employer under false pretenses. Jimmy complicates the case by sleeping with the opposition, but in doing so, he uncovers something that actually helps Jenna and her client. Elsewhere, Ceil agrees to hold a ceremonial funeral for the "old Ceil", but Sandy, now an ordained minister, wants to make it look like a real funeral in order to attract clients.
| 3 | "Jenna's Friend" | Jason Priestley | Howard Busgang & Tom Nursall | March 26, 2014 | July 24, 2014 | 2.17 |
| 4 | "Picture Night" | James Genn | Rupinder Gill | April 2, 2014 | July 31, 2014 | 1.88 |
| 5 | "Meet Irene Horowitz" | Jason Priestley | Jane Cooper Ford | April 9, 2014 | August 7, 2014 | 1.87 |
| 6 | "Jenna's Presentation" | Mel Damski | Diane Flacks | April 16, 2014 | N/A | N/A |
| 7 | "The Crazy Family" | Keith Samples | Jane Cooper Ford | April 23, 2014 | N/A | N/A |
| 8 | "Jenna vs. The Momfia" | James Genn | Fabrizio Flippo | April 30, 2014 | N/A | N/A |
| 9 | "The Book Club" | Keith Samples | Josh Gal | May 7, 2014 | N/A | N/A |
| 10 | "Jenna vs. Big Pastry" | Keith Samples | Jane Cooper Ford | May 14, 2014 | N/A | N/A |
| 11 | "Jenna vs. Big Pastry Part 2" | Jason Priestley | Howard Busgang | May 22, 2014 | N/A | N/A |
| 12 | "Family Therapy" | Jason Priestley | Katie Ford & Stephanie Kaliner | May 29, 2014 | N/A | N/A |
