= Down the Shore (TV series) =

- Genre: Sitcom
- Created by: Alan Kirschenbaum
- Starring: Louis Mandylor; Anna Gunn; Lew Schneider; Cathryn de Prume; Pamela Segall; Tom McGowan; Nancy Sorel
- Opening theme: "I Don't Wanna Go Home" written by Steven Van Zandt and performed by Southside Johnny and the Asbury Jukes
- Composer: Rick Marotta
- Country of origin: United States
- Original language: English
- No. of seasons: 2
- No. of episodes: 29

Production
- Executive producers: Alan Kirschenbaum; Erwin Stoff
- Producers: Shannon Gaughan; Olivia Goldstick; Teresa O'Neill; Philip Rosenthal; Andrew Selig; Michael Stokes
- Cinematography: Daniel Flannery
- Running time: 22–24 minutes
- Production companies: Caravan Entertainment; 3 Arts Entertainment; HBO Independent Productions

Original release
- Network: Fox
- Release: June 21, 1992 – May 27, 1993

Down the Shore is an American sitcom television series created by Alan Kirschenbaum, which aired on Fox from June 21, 1992, to May 27, 1993.

== Synopsis ==
The series revolves around three childhood friends, Aldo, Zack, and Eddie. In hopes of meeting women at the Jersey Shore over the summer, they decided to get a beach house in Belmar, New Jersey. To cover expenses, they share the beach house with three female co-workers, Donna, Miranda, and Arden. At the start of the second season, Miranda was written out of the series by having a job that was too demanding, and the new female occupant of the beach house was a woman named Sammy, whom Aldo once had a fling with.

Although the show was largely comedic in nature, it did have one notable episode where Aldo, a noted Lothario, had been briefly hospitalized and was awaiting the result of an AIDS test. This made all the renters of the beach home, while supportive of Aldo awaiting the results, mull over the fact that casual sex can come with an expensive price.

The show ran for 29 episodes over two seasons. The first episode aired Sunday at 9:30 pm and the rest of the first season aired at 10:00 pm. The second season aired Sunday at 10:30 pm for the first two episodes and Thursday at 9:30 pm for the remaining episodes.

== Cast ==
- Louis Mandylor as Aldo Carbone
- Anna Gunn as Arden
- Lew Schneider as Zack Singer
- Cathryn de Prume as Donna Shipko
- Pamela Segall as Miranda Halpern (13 episodes, 1992)
- Tom McGowan as Eddie Cheever
- Nancy Sorel as Sammy (15 episodes, 1992–1993)

== Episodes ==
=== Season 1 (1992) ===
No. overall	No. in season	Title	Directed by	Written by	Original release date
1	1	"Independence Day"	John Sgueglia	Alan Kirschenbaum	June 21, 1992
After Arden is blown off by her workaholic boyfriend, she's so moved by Eddie's kind words that she takes his virginity.
2	2	"Waiting for Aldo"	John Sgueglia	Larry Kase & Joel Ronkin	June 28, 1992
When Zach finds himself waiting for Aldo, he suspects that his buddy's shacked up with a woman. Guest Star: Ann Turkel
3	3	"Hitting Mrs. Krell"	John Sgueglia	Alan Kirschenbaum	July 5, 1992
Donna goes overboard trying to make amends to an old woman whom she hit with her car. Meanwhile, Aldo's latest conquest is too much woman for him. Guest Stars: Anne Pitoniak (Mrs. Krell), Darlene Vogel (Betsy Fallon)
4	4	"Eddie's Date"	John Sgueglia	Oliver Goldstick & Philip Rosenthal	July 12, 1992
Eddie has a disastrous date with a shy local. Guest Stars: Susan Varon (Waitress), Vicki Juditz
5	5	"Schwing Time"	John Sgueglia	Oliver Goldstick & Philip Rosenthal	July 19, 1992
A magazine chooses the beach house as the location for their swimsuit photo shoot. Guest Stars: Cristine Rose (Wilma Shyrer), Fabiana Udenio (Gina), Cindy Ambuehl (Tawny), Natasha Pavlovich (Marishka), Garcelle Beauvais (Liat), Anya Longwell (Genevieve), Steve Mittleman (Andy)
6	6	"A Tale of Two Houses"	John Sgueglia	Eileen Heisler & DeAnn Heline	July 26, 1992
When Arden moves to a new beach house, she finds her former roomies to be an embarrassment. Guest Stars: Anthony Starke (Vaughn), Mary Elizabeth McGlynn (Brigitte), Robert Jacobs (Niles), Liza Snyder (Claire)
7	7	"The Glassman Cometh"	John Sgueglia	Eileen Heisler & DeAnn Heline	August 2, 1992
Miranda falls for a man who fixes windows. Guest Star: Anthony Tyler Quinn (Joe)
8	8	"A House Divided"	John Sgueglia	Alan Kirschenbaum	August 9, 1992
Three men and three women decide to split the rent on a Belmar beach house. Guest Star: Raymond O'Connor (Carl); Note: This was intended to be the series premiere, but Fox aired the episodes out of sequence.
9	9	"A Blast from the Past"	John Sgueglia	Unknown	August 16, 1992
A nuisance visits the beach house. Guest Star: Thomas Mills Wood (Spazman)
10	10	"And Justice for All"	Peter Noah	Shannon Gaughan	August 23, 1992
Miranda is disgusted when the guys attend a wet T-shirt contest, so she and Donna attempt to demystify the female form by sunbathing topless, which gets them in trouble with the law. Guest Star: Peter Iacangelo (Policeman)
11	11	"Atlantic City"	John Sgueglia	Victor Levin & Michael Rowe	August 23, 1992
Zach tags along on a trip to Atlantic City and meets the girl of his dreams. Guest Stars: Carrie-Anne Moss (Nancy), Danny Dayton (Jackie), Teresa Velarde (Waitress), Cletus Young (The Stickman), Ellen Albertini Dow (The Old Woman), Marty Roberts (Stan), Elayne Roberts (Judy), Billy 12th Street (The Man), Herb Muller (The Laughing Man)
12	12	"Turn of the Screw"	John Sgueglia	Oliver Goldstick & Phil Rosenthal	September 13, 1992
Aldo feels a sense of fatal attraction when his latest sexual conquest refuses to let him go. Guest Stars: Monica Horan (Linda), Brenda Strong (Eileen), Murray Rubin (Mr. Kurshner), Cynthia Frost (Mrs. Kurshner), Jim Maniaci (Lester)
13	13	"My Left Feet"	John Sgueglia	Oliver Goldstick & Phil Rosenthal	September 20, 1992
Donna and Eddie decide to participate in a dance contest. Guest Stars: Frances Bay (Miss Suzette), Cynthia Frost (Mrs. Kurshner), Marjorie Lovett (Sylvia), Marte Boyle Slout (Helen), Troy Curvey Jr. (The D.J.), Rose Jackson (Tasha), Rana Kirkland (Gwen), Yvette Freeman (Woman)

=== Season 2 (1992–93) ===
No. overall	No. in season	Title	Directed by	Written by	Original release date
14	1	"No Hard Feelings"	Peter Noah	Oliver Goldstick & Phil Rosenthal	December 3, 1992
After Miranda moves out, she's replaced by Sammy, a jewelry designer, whom Aldo once experienced performance anxiety with. Guest Star: Louis Guss (Richie)
15	2	"Hey Sis, You Up?"	Peter Noah	Victor Levin	December 10, 1992
When Arden realizes Aldo is hot for her baby sister, she decides to mess with his mind by throwing herself at him, while Aldo teases Zach by asking to borrow a condom from him, since he always has them available due to his lack of dates. This inadvertently leads the sisters to being reunited, and Zach has the last laugh by equating Aldo's ultimate debacle to the Aesop's Fable of the Dog and its Reflection. Guest Star: Kim Walker (Hillary)
16	3	"If I Only Had a Brain"	John Sgueglia	Story by : Terri Minsky; Teleplay by : Teresa O'Neill & Victor Levin	December 17, 1992
When Donna feels inferior to dating a Mensa member, she uses I.Q. boosting pills. This is questionable among the others, particularly Zach, who spends his weekdays as a teacher and does not believe intelligence can be bottled nor sold. Guest Star: Tom Isbell (Howard)
17	4	"A Married Man"	Peter Noah	Shannon Gaughan	January 7, 1993
The man whom Sammy is having an affair with decides to leave his wife. Guest Stars: Jere Burns (Jeffrey Horan), Marilyn Fox (Gloria)
18	5	"Hazel's of Belmar"	John Sgueglia	Unknown	January 14, 1993
Aldo finds himself in a bind when he was hired to do a lingerie show, but the models walk off in fear when they find out the store was bought by a mobster's wife. The group decides to save Aldo's skin by working as underwear models, with Eddie as the master of ceremonies. Guest Stars: Liz Torres (Hazel de Falco), Ron Karabatsos (Fat Frank), Mychelle Charters (Stacy), Donna Baltron (Mary Grace)
19	6	"Fast Friends"	Rob Schiller	Victor Levin	January 21, 1993
After Zach and Sammy are both stood up, they decide to have a fling with each other. This causes the wrath of Aldo to come down upon Zach.
20	7	"Test of Strength"	John Sgueglia	Alan Kirschenbaum	January 28, 1993
After a fainting spell, Aldo is prescribed an HIV test. Waiting for the doctor's call is worse than the water torture as the entire sextet reflects that casual sex has gone from commonplace recreation to a dangerous and potentially deadly game. Guest Stars: Milton Selzer (Dr. Feldman), Lisa Gorlitsky (Nurse)
21	8	"Computer Date"	Paul Miller	Teresa O'Neill & Alan Kirschenbaum	February 18, 1993
Eddie's so nervous to meet his computer dating match that Aldo swoops in and takes his place. Meanwhile, Donna brings home a lost boy. Guest Stars: Kathy Ireland (Rachel), Kellen Hathaway (Kevin), Stephanie Shroyer (Kevin's Mother); Note: Kathy Ireland appeared on the Fox sketch-comedy show The Edge the same week.
22	9	"Crowded House"	Rob Schiller	Bill Diamond & Michael Saltzman	March 4, 1993
There's no room in the beach house when everyone invites guests, and the main sextet find themselves roomless when their guests hook up with each other. Guest Stars: Tom Silardi (Tony), Rob Neukirch (Andrew), Jonathan Chapin (Bela), Helen Greenberg (Freida), Bud Leslie (Bernard), Janis Lee (Wendy), Lisa Walters (Jennifer), Philip Rosenthal (Lech)
23	10	"The Last Temptation of Eddie: Part 1"	Peter Noah	Oliver Goldstick & Phil Rosenthal	March 11, 1993
Eddie is coerced into a visit with the hard-partying neighbors and he winds up with a wife. The others get concerned when he spends the entire week down the shore and announces his plans to drop out of his career. Guest Stars: Donna Baltron (Cheyenne Grimmick), David Bowe (Rush), Peter Navy Tuiasosopo (Wooly), Shannon Whirry (Sue), Rick Marotta (Rick), Trevor Goddard (Stench); Note: Originally scheduled to air on February 25, 1993.
24	11	"The Last Temptation of Eddie: Part 2"	Peter Noah	Jeremy Stevens	March 18, 1993
Eddie's honeymoon is interrupted by his wife's husband, who was presumed dead. Eddie is heartbroken, until he reclaims his lost glasses and looks in the mirror. When he sees a slovenly man looking back at him, Eddie resolves to return to his humdrum life. Guest Stars: Donna Baltron (Cheyenne Grimmick), Rex Ryan (Buck Grimmick), David Bowe (Rush), Peter Navy Tuiasosopo (Wooly), Shannon Whirry (Sue), Rick Marotta (Rick), Trevor Goddard (Stench); Note: Originally scheduled to air on March 3, 1993.
25	12	"Life's a Drag"	Rob Schiller	Teresa O'Neill & Jeremy Stevens	April 1, 1993
Aldo goes to the bar dressed in drag and winds up as the object of another man's affections. Guest Stars: Sam McMurray (Ron), Kevin Brief (Seth), R. Martin Klein (Myron), Suzanne O'Donnell (Janine), Victoria Hemingson (Girl), Paul Cira (Evan), Chuck E. Weiss & The Goddamn Liars (Themselves)
26	13	"Brilliant Disguise"	Peter Noah	Teresa O'Neill	April 8, 1993
Eddie befriends his ex-girlfriend's new boyfriend. Guest Stars: Vicki Juditz (Darlene), Tom Alan Robbins (Vic), Chuck E. Weiss & The Goddamn Liars (Themselves), Tony Nittoli (Tony), Susannah Julien (Girl in Bar)
27	14	"Jail Bait"	Alan Kirschenbaum	Oliver Goldstick & Phil Rosenthal	April 15, 1993
The guys get lost while on the way to a concert and find themselves in a rural part of New Jersey. They were lent a car and discovered a crate of beer inside, which they use to get drunk and enjoy themselves. However, they are soon arrested as the car they were lent was stolen. Guest Stars: Roy Brocksmith (Judge), Yvette Freeman (Sheriff), David Bowe (Rush), Eddie Gorodetsky (Ozzie), Mark Beltzman (Lester), Willy Parsons (Fred)
28	15	"One Smart Kalatchkie"	Zane Buzby	Oliver Goldstick & Phil Rosenthal	April 22, 1993
After being passed over for a promotion, Donna decides to start a business making kolaches. Guest Stars: Cynthia Frost (Mrs. Kushner), Marjorie Lovett (Sylvia), Marte Boyle Slout (Helen), Jennifer Heftler (Rita), Randy Oglesby (Robert), Barry Kramer (The Guest), Lorie Stevens (Girl Scout)
29	16	"Swept Away in Belmar Bay"	Alan Kirschenbaum	Teresa O'Neill	May 27, 1993
After being stranded on her date's yacht, Arden hooks up with his employee. Guest Stars: David Ciminello (Marco), John DeMita (Elliot); Note: A retread of the 1974 film Swept Away.
