= The Walk (The X-Files) =

- The X-Files episode
- The episode's antagonist: Rappo. The episode was inspired by the film The Men, which features a character who has lost his legs in war and wishes to be able to walk again.
- Episode no.: Season 3 Episode 7
- Directed by: Rob Bowman
- Written by: John Shiban
- Production code: 3X07
- Original air date: November 10, 1995
- Running time: 45 minutes

Guest appearances
- Thomas Kopache as General Thomas Callahan; Willie Garson as Quinton "Roach" Freely; Don Thompson as Lt. Col. Victor Stans; Nancy Sorel as Capt. Janet Draper; Ian Tracey as Leonard "Rappo" Trimble

Episode chronology
← Previous "2Shy"	Next → "Oubliette"
- The X-Files season 3

"The Walk" is the seventh episode of the third season of the American science fiction television series The X-Files. It was written by John Shiban and directed by Rob Bowman. The episode aired in the United States on November 10, 1995, on the Fox network. The episode is a "Monster-of-the-Week" story, a stand-alone plot which is unconnected to the series' wider mythology. "The Walk" earned a Nielsen household rating of 10.4, being watched by 15.91 million people in its initial broadcast. Critical reception was mixed.

The show centers on FBI special agents Fox Mulder (David Duchovny) and Dana Scully (Gillian Anderson) who work on cases linked to the paranormal, called X-Files. Mulder is a believer in the paranormal, while the skeptical Scully has been assigned to debunk his work. In this episode, a suicide attempt by a patient in a U.S. Army hospital interests Mulder with the talk of a "phantom soldier" who has prevented the man's death. The U.S. Army general in charge of the hospital is initially opposed to the FBI's involvement until the invisible killer begins stalking him. Everyone involved in the case is shocked to learn that the primary suspect could in fact, be a quadruple amputee.

"The Walk" is the first X-Files script by John Shiban, who commented that it was a challenge for him. He was inspired by the film The Men, which features a character who has lost his legs in war and wishes to be able to walk again. The episode required several visual effects which were almost not completed in time.

== Plot ==
At a VA hospital in Fort Evanston, Maryland, Lieutenant Colonel Victor Stans makes his third suicide attempt; he claims that a mysterious figure will not let him die. Stans attempts to drown in a tub of scalding water, but is rescued by the hospital staff and left disfigured.

When Fox Mulder and Dana Scully question Stans, they learn that his wife and children died in a house fire he claims was started by the mysterious soldier he says will not allow him to die. Captain Janet Draper stops the questioning, as Mulder and Scully were not granted permission to see Stans by his superior officer, General Thomas Callahan. After meeting with the agents, Callahan glimpses the phantom soldier Stans described. He also finds his answering machine replaying an unintelligible message. Later, while using the base's swimming pool, Draper is drowned by an invisible force.

Callahan tells the agents about the soldier and the voicemail, which was received twice before at his home. When they visit his house, his young son, Trevor, believes he saw someone go inside; Scully herself glimpses someone in the backyard. Fingerprints are found on the property which belong to the hospital mailman, Quinton "Roach" Freely. As Mulder and Scully take Roach into custody, Trevor is attacked and buried by the invisible force in his sandbox. Under the agent's questioning, Roach admits to his role in the deaths and states he is "Rappo's mailman".

"Rappo" turns out to be Leonard Trimble, a Gulf War veteran and quadruple amputee. Scully doesn't believe Roach, even though he insists that Rappo will kill him next. Scully later finds Roach dead in his cell with a bedsheet shoved down his throat. Scully assumes that he committed suicide, but Mulder shows her X-ray film he carried in the rehab room, the pool, Callahan's office, and Callahan's house; all show signs of radiation. Mulder thinks that Rappo is leaving his body through astral projection, doing so with a psychic connection forged through Roach's letters. He plays the voicemail backwards; it is actually a threat from the phantom soldier.

Under questioning, an embittered Rappo blames his Gulf War experiences for ruining his life. Meanwhile, Callahan finds his wife's dead body. He goes to the hospital to talk to Stans, who reveals that Rappo — whom he doesn't know — is responsible for the deaths. When Callahan confronts Rappo, he openly admits his crimes. Rappo tries to goad Callahan into killing him, but Callahan decides to "stand down" and shoots over Rappo's head. Callahan tells Rappo that he will suffer like him and the others, leaving Rappo enraged. The agents arrive and find Rappo in a trance. Scully thinks he's having a seizure, but Mulder realizes what is happening and tries to find Callahan. Rappo's apparition attacks Callahan with steam from the pipes in the hospital's basement. Stans enters Rappo's room, locks the door, and smothers Rappo with a pillow. With Rappo dead, his apparition disappears before it attacks Mulder. Callahan remains unharmed.

Since there is no physical evidence to prove that Rappo killed Callahan's wife and son, the case remains unsolved. Stans is released and becomes Callahan's mailman - both Lieutenant Colonel and General acknowledge each other before the former leaves to continue his work. Mulder's narration states that Rappo's family tried to have him buried at Arlington National Cemetery, but the Army denied their request; he was instead cremated and buried in a civilian cemetery in Pennsylvania.

== Production ==
"The Walk" was filmed in June 1995 and was written by John Shiban, making it his first contribution to the series. Being new to the series, he found the episode challenging to write, particularly in the beginning where Mulder and Scully "have to come together on a case, yet they have to be at odds". Shiban was inspired by the film The Men (1950), about a World War II lieutenant who is seriously injured in combat and wants nothing more than to be able to walk again. He eventually connected this desire with the parapsychological concept of astral projection, and the two "just sort of fit". Some members of the writing staff were concerned about killing Callahan's young son, Trevor, but Shiban was not bothered by it and felt that Rappo wanted to take everything from Callahan, and the worst blow would be to kill his son.

Director Rob Bowman felt that Ian Tracey, who played Rappo, was "an incredibly strong actor" and fit the role. Deryl Hayes, who played an army psychiatrist in this episode, previously appeared as a CIA operative in the first season episode "Shadows". Draper's drowning scene required actress Nancy Sorel to be yanked underwater by a discreet cable connected to the floor of the pool. The effect of a wave overtaking Draper was created by special effects department members Mat Beck and David Gauthier. For the scene in which Trevor is killed, one of the show's stuntmen was buried in sand and "burst out" on cue; this shot was then digitally augmented in post-production. The effect in the climax where Rappo's apparition throws Callahan and Mulder across the room was created with an air ram—a pneumatic device that catapults a stunt performer through the air using compressed air. The visual effects for the episode required substantial attention and were almost not completed in time.

== Reception ==
"The Walk" was first broadcast on the Fox network on November 10, 1995. It earned a Nielsen rating of 10.4, with an 18 share, meaning that roughly 10.4 percent of all television-equipped households, and 18 percent of households watching television, were tuned in to the episode. It was watched by a total of 15.91 million viewers.

In a retrospective of the third season by Entertainment Weekly,"The Walk" was given a grade of C, noting its similarities to other episodes and being critical of the characters. Emily VanDerWerff of The A.V. Club gave it a grade of B, describing it as "straightforward", with a "well-realized" military hospital and "terrific" directing. However, she felt that Ian Tracey was not a good enough actor to make Rappo's motives seem believable. Paula Vitaris from Cinefantastique gave the episode two and a half stars out of four, calling it a "solid episode" with a good supporting cast and effects. However, she felt the characterization of Mulder and Scully was "off-balance" and noted that some of the military detail was wrong. Robert Shearman, in his book Wanting to Believe: A Critical Guide to The X-Files, Millennium & The Lone Gunmen, rated the episode three and a half stars out of five. While noting the episode's similarities to "2Shy", Shearman wrote that Shiban "put real blood and passion into it which raises it high above the trappings of its clichés". Shearman did, however, criticize the plot for being too predictable and formulaic, but said it succeeded in emotion and was "well-written" and "well-directed".

== Bibliography ==
- Hurwitz, Matt; Knowles, Chris (2008). The Complete X-Files. Insight Editions. ISBN 978-1-933784-80-9.
- Lowry, Brian (1995). The Truth is Out There: The Official Guide to the X-Files. Harper Prism. ISBN 0061053309.
- Shearman, Robert (2009). Wanting to Believe: A Critical Guide to The X-Files, Millennium & The Lone Gunmen. Mad Norwegian Press. ISBN 978-0-9759446-9-1.
