= Benjamin Arthur (actor) =

Canadian actor

Benjamin Arthur (born Benjamin Arthur Gutknecht) is a Canadian actor from Kitimat, British Columbia. He is most noted for his regular role as Josh Blecher in the television comedy series Less Than Kind, for which he won the Gemini Award for Individual Performance in a Comedy Program or Series at the 25th Gemini Awards in 2010.

He was previously nominated in the same category at the 24th Gemini Awards in 2009.

== Filmography ==
=== Film ===
Year	Title	Role	Notes
2003	Gordon	Steve	
2005	Darkest Hour	Dreighton Sawyer	
2008	That One Night	Chauncey	
2010	Switch	Gray Kinsman	
2012	American Reunion	Chester	
2012	Hang Loose	Ben	Also writer
2012	The Movie Out Here	Mick	
2012	Charlie	Tyson	
2015	The Steps	David	
2016	Blood Hunters	Henry	
2021	Last Survivors	Andy	

=== Television ===
Year	Title	Role	Notes
2006	Whistler	Employee	Episode: "Out of the Shadows"
2006	My Silent Partner	Young Man	Television film
2006, 2007	The L Word	Hip Guy / 70's Faggot #2	2 episodes
2008–2013	Less Than Kind	Josh Blecher	41 episodes
2009	Something Evil Comes	Jordan	Television film
2014	Saving Hope	Seth Rollins	Episode: "Wide Awake"
2014	Working the Engels	Jimmy Engel	12 episodes
2017	FANatic	Hunter Clay / Kal	Television film
2018	The Mick	Doug	Episode: "The Night Off"
2018	Superstore	Kent	Episode: "Managers' Conference"
2022	Young Rock	Jake 'The Snake'	2 episodes
