= Less Than Kind =

Canadian television comedy-drama series

- Title design by Cuppa Coffee Studios
- Genre: Comedy drama
- Created by: Marvin Kaye; Chris Sheasgreen
- Directed by: James Dunnison; Bruce McDonald; Mark McKinney; Kelly Makin; Douglas Mitchell; Henry Sarwer-Foner; Shawn Alex Thompson; Gary Yates; Marvin Kaye; Chris Sheasgreen
- Starring: Jesse Camacho; Wendel Meldrum; Benjamin Arthur; Nancy Sorel; Emma Bambrick; Maury Chaykin; Daniel Kash; Lisa Durupt; Ross McMillan; Brooke Palsson; Tyler Johnston; Mike O'Brien
- Theme music composer: The Weakerthans
- Opening theme: "One Great City!"
- Composer: Richard Pell
- Country of origin: Canada
- Original language: English
- No. of seasons: 4
- No. of episodes: 48 (list of episodes)

Production
- Executive producers: Mark McKinney; Marvin Kaye; Chris Sheasgreen; Phyllis Laing; Ira Levy; Peter Williamson
- Producers: Jan Peter Meyboom; Kirsten Scollie; Paula J. Smith
- Production locations: Winnipeg, Manitoba, Canada
- Cinematography: David Perrault; Mike Marshal
- Editors: Gareth C. Scales; Paul Winestock; Matt Hannam; Craig Webster
- Running time: 30 minutes
- Production companies: Buffalo Gal Pictures; Breakthrough Films & Television

Original release
- Network: Citytv
- Release: October 13, 2008 – February 2, 2009
- Network: HBO Canada
- Release: February 19, 2010 – July 14, 2013

Less Than Kind is a 2008–13 Canadian television comedy-drama series that stars Jesse Camacho as Sheldon Blecher, a teenager growing up in a loving but dysfunctional Jewish family in Winnipeg. The show's cast also includes Maury Chaykin and Wendel Meldrum as Sheldon's parents, Benjamin Arthur as his older brother Josh, and Nancy Sorel as his aunt Clara. The Blechers struggle to operate a driving school out of their home in Winnipeg's fading North End. Less Than Kind made its debut October 13, 2008, on Citytv, and moved to HBO Canada in February 2010.

The ensemble cast of the critically acclaimed series won Canadian Comedy Awards in 2009 and 2010. Less Than Kind received the 2010 Gemini Award for Best Comedy Program or Series and the inaugural award for Best Comedy Series at the 1st Canadian Screen Awards.

The title sequence and logo for Less Than Kind were inspired by an iconic highway sign at Winnipeg's Confusion Corner intersection, depicting arrows pointing in every direction.

The name of the series is found in the first line spoken by Hamlet (Act 1, Scene 2): "A little more than kin, and less than kind."

== Cast and characters ==
Actor	Character	Seasons			
Actor	Character	1	2	3	4
Jesse Camacho	Sheldon Blecher	Main	Main	Main	Main
Wendel Meldrum	Anne Blecher	Main	Main	Main	Main
Benjamin Arthur	Josh Blecher	Main	Main	Main	Main
Nancy Sorel	Clara Fine	Main	Main	Main	Main
Emma Bambrick	Imelda Amahit	Main			
Maury Chaykin	Sam Blecher	Main	Main		
Daniel Kash	Rabbi Rabinowitz	Starring (Note: Kash is credited as a starring cast member in the pilot episode only, and as a guest star in any other appearances within the season.)		Guest	
Lisa Durupt (Note: Credited as Lisa Anne Durupt in early appearances.)	Shandra	Starring (Note: Received main billing only in the episodes in which they appear.)	Starring	Starring	Starring
Ross McMillan	Franklin Lubbe	Starring	Starring	Starring	Starring
Brooke Palsson	Miriam Goldstein	Starring	Main	Main	Main
Tyler Johnston	Danny Lubbe		Starring	Starring	Starring
Mike O'Brien	Lorne Goldstein	Recurring	Recurring	Starring	Starring

== Episodes ==
Season	Episodes	Originally released		
Season	Episodes	First released	Last released	Network
1	13	October 13, 2008	February 2, 2009	Citytv
2	13	February 19, 2010	May 21, 2010	HBO Canada
3	13	January 15, 2012	March 25, 2012	HBO Canada
4	9	June 2, 2013	July 14, 2013	HBO Canada

== Production ==
We understood that the value of the show was in the fact that it's not a sitcom — it's a show that's beautifully written, with characters that are less than perfect, that are real.... We're not wrapping every episode up nice and neatly, because it's all in the sloppiness — that's where the gold is.

— Maury Chaykin

Less Than Kind was created by Marvin Kaye and Chris Sheasgreen, who loosely based the series on Kaye's successful one-act play, They Have Mayonnaise in Montreal. "I liked the characters and liked that it was kind of based on Marvin's life," said showrunner Mark McKinney. "It had a ring of truth to it, had heart.... It was pretty easy to climb on board."

The series was produced for City by Buffalo Gal Pictures and Breakthrough Films & Television. It was originally announced as part of Citytv's 2007 schedule, but was delayed because CTVglobemedia's acquisition of CHUM Limited and subsequent sale of Citytv to Rogers Media necessitated that the two companies sort out programming rights between Citytv and its former sister network A-Channel. The series made its debut October 13, 2008. For the second season, the show moved to HBO Canada.

Following Chaykin's death in July 2010, the show's producers announced that production on the third season would be delayed, but that the show would continue. Production of the third season began in November 2010, with directors including James Dunnison, Bruce McDonald, Mark McKinney, Kelly Makin, Douglas Mitchell and Gary Yates.

The fourth and final season of Less Than Kind was filmed in Winnipeg May 28 – July 10, 2012, for broadcast in 2013. "We are all thrilled to be doing a fourth season that offers the creative challenge of concluding this story and this wonderful series," said executive producer Mark McKinney.

== Broadcast history ==
The first season of Less Than Kind premiered on October 13, 2008, on Citytv. The show's second season premiered on Friday, February 19, 2010, at 8:30 p.m. ET/MT on HBO Canada, a multiplex channel of The Movie Network and Movie Central. In June 2010 it was announced that HBO Canada had picked up the show for a third season.

Distributed by Breakthrough Entertainment, Less Than Kind began airing on South Africa Sony Entertainment Television in the fall of 2009. In late 2009 the series began airing on Anixe HD in Germany.

The US debut was scheduled for DirecTV's Audience Network on November 3, 2011. DirecTV acquired all 3 seasons.

The series' final episode aired on July 14, 2013.

== Home video releases ==
In September 2012, Less Than Kind was one of the three titles chosen to launch Breakthrough Entertainment's newly established online distribution division, Breakthrough Home Entertainment. The first season of the series was offered for sale as a three-disc DVD set available for Canadian purchasers only.

== Reception ==
The first episode drew 47,000 viewers.

=== Reviews and commentary ===
- Vanessa Farquharson, National Post (August 21, 2008) — Refreshingly edgy.... The episodes all come together in something that might be called an organized mess. Multiple plot lines get tangled, supporting characters come and go, but ultimately there's a strong core of actors holding this together. They know when to improvise and when to stick to the script, and they realize Winnipeg is not Los Angeles, and that this is a good thing — Less Than Kind is far from predictable Hollywood pap.
- Amber Dowling, TV Guide (September 8, 2008) — Less Than Kind is the kind of show you actually want to watch with your family.
- Joshua Ostroff, Eye Weekly (October 8, 2008) — Less Than Kind is about a perpetual-winter Winnipeg as seen from the perspective of fat-but-brilliant 15-year-old Sheldon Blecher (the impressive-beyond-his-years Jesse Camacho), who balances self-loathing with a pride in his own intelligence. ... The show's melancholic humour and near-perfect casting for its array of sweet-natured outsiders comes from creator Marvin Kaye, who expanded the semi-autobiographical series from his one-act play, and exec producer Mark McKinney (The Kids in the Hall, Slings & Arrows). The Weakerthans supply a perfect theme song.
- Rob Salem, Toronto Star (October 13, 2008) — It is some small comfort, as we begin the big adieu tonight for the final season of the much-admired Corner Gas, that just one hour later on Citytv, we are introduced to another mid-country comedy that could well be its successor, Less Than Kind. And, in a further vote of confidence, the show has already been picked up for a second season even before the first of these initial 13 hits the air. ... Again, the comedy is character-driven, in this case by the only somewhat less overtly eccentric members of the Blecher family, focusing on the younger son, Sheldon, embodied — and then some — by plus-sized 17-year-old Jesse Camacho, who often almost eerily evokes a young John Candy. Except in his scenes with Blecher patriarch Maury Chaykin, an endearingly shady driving instructor. Together onscreen, they could not be any closer than acorn to tree. ... It is Camacho and Chaykin, together, separately and in combination with the others, who make this wonky domestic sitcom work.
- Kate Taylor, The Globe and Mail (October 13, 2008) — Less Than Kind features the Blechers, a Jewish family in Winnipeg whose members include a scheming dad, a pyromaniacal mother, a nymphomaniacal aunt and two mismatched brothers. The first is a self-absorbed, failed actor; the second is a sympathetic teenage fat boy and the show's protagonist. With confident performances from Maury Chaykin as the irascible dad who operates a driving school on barter, and Jesse Camacho as the put-upon but surprisingly mature nerd trying to juggle girls and school, Less Than Kind also offers a strong ensemble — and the occasional flash of comic brilliance. The family with the pyromaniac mum is trying to get its son bar-mitzvahed at a synagogue that is under repairs after a mysterious fire.
- Joel Rubinoff, Waterloo Record (October 25, 2008) — One of the edgiest Canadian comedies in recent history.... Less Than Kind is different. Not only does it boast the acerbic wit of its producer, former Kid in the Hall Mark McKinney, but as a low-budget Canadian show that flies stealthily under the radar, it's fearless.
- Andrew Ryan, The Globe and Mail (November 7, 2008) — What happens in Winnipeg stays in Winnipeg on this engaging homegrown series. Montreal native Jesse Camacho is a true find as the lovable loser Sheldon Blecher.
- Alison Gillmor, CBC News (November 17, 2008) — Less Than Kind, which has already been picked up for a second season, works because it integrates Winnipeg's crowded past with a fierce, funny and generous look at a timeless situation. Fifteen-year-old Sheldon Blecher (played by the tremendously appealing Jesse Camacho) is an old soul in Husky Boy jeans; he is the only grownup in a completely loopy family. Father Sam (played by Maury Chaykin, once again proving he is Canada's best character actor) is perpetually furious, constantly scheming. Warm, well-meaning mother Anne (Wendel Meldrum) handles her stress with a touch of pyromania.... Like its opening theme song — the Weakerthans’ "One Great City," with its plaintive "I hate Winnipeg" refrain — the show takes complaints and carping and turns them into anguished love.
- John Doyle, The Globe and Mail (December 24, 2010) — Strange and lovely, anchored in the poetry of the ordinary, this finespun comedy set in Winnipeg has had a life more eventful than most of its plotlines. First aired but ignored on the City TV channels, it came back for a second season on HBO Canada, got quiet acclaim and then suffered the death of one of its mainstays, actor Maury Chaykin. Long may it continue its loopy, warm meandering.

=== Awards and nominations ===
Over the four seasons of the series, it received 55 nominations, earning 16 wins, including recognition from the Leo Awards, Canadian Comedy Awards, Directors Guild of Canada, Writers Guild of Canada, Gemini Awards, ACTRA Awards, Canadian Cinema Editors awards, Young Artist Awards, and Canadian Screen Awards.

Award	Category	Name	Outcome
Leo Award 2009	Best Supporting Performance by a Male in a Dramatic Series	Benjamin Arthur, "Top of the Class"	Won
Canadian Comedy Award 2009	Best Performance by an Ensemble – Television	Less Than Kind	Won
Canadian Comedy Award 2009	Best Performance by a Female – Television	Wendel Meldrum	Won
DGC Craft Award 2009	Outstanding Achievement in Direction	Shawn Alex Thompson, "French is My Kryptonite"	Nominated
Gemini Award 2009	Best Comedy Program or Series	Less Than Kind	Nominated
Gemini Award 2009	Best Direction in a Comedy Program or Series	James Dunnison, "Fun"	Nominated
Gemini Award 2009	Best Direction in a Comedy Program or Series	Kelly Makin, "The Daters"	Won
Gemini Award 2009	Best Direction in a Comedy Program or Series	Henry Sarwer-Foner, "Pakikisama"	Nominated
Gemini Award 2009	Best Direction in a Comedy Program or Series	Shawn Alex Thompson, "French is My Kryptonite"	Nominated
Gemini Award 2009	Best Writing in a Comedy Program or Series	Mark McKinney, "Careers Day"	Nominated
Gemini Award 2009	Best Individual Performance in a Comedy Program or Series	Brooke Palsson, "French is My Kryptonite"	Nominated
Gemini Award 2009	Best Individual Performance in a Comedy Program or Series	Benjamin Arthur, "Pakikisama"	Nominated
Gemini Award 2009	Best Achievement in Casting	Susan Forrest, Sharon Forrest and Jim Heber, "The Daters"	Nominated
WGC Screenwriting Award 2010	Best Episodic half-hour	Garry Campbell, "The Daters"	Won
WGC Screenwriting Award 2010	Best Episodic half-hour	Jenn Engels, "Fun"	Nominated
WGC Screenwriting Award 2010	Best Episodic half-hour	Marvin Kaye and Chris Sheasgreen, "Happy Birthday, Sheldon"	Nominated
WGC Screenwriting Award 2010	Best Episodic half-hour	Mark McKinney, "Careers Day"	Nominated
DGC Team Achievement Award 2010	Best Television Series – Comedy	"Third Death's the Charm"	Nominated
Canadian Comedy Award 2010	Best Direction – Television Program or Series	Kelly Makin	Nominated
Canadian Comedy Award 2010	Best Writing – Television Program or Series	Garry Campbell	Nominated
Canadian Comedy Award 2010	Best Writing – Television Program or Series	Mark McKinney	Won
Canadian Comedy Award 2010	Best Performance by a Female – Television	Jennifer Irwin	Nominated
Canadian Comedy Award 2010	Best Performance by a Female – Television	Wendel Meldrum	Nominated
Canadian Comedy Award 2010	Best Performance by a Male – Television	Dave Foley	Won
Canadian Comedy Award 2010	Best Performance by an Ensemble – Television	Less Than Kind	Won
Gemini Award 2010	Best Comedy Program or Series	Less Than Kind	Won
Gemini Award 2010	Best Direction in a Comedy Program or Series	James Dunnison, "First Nighters"	Nominated
Gemini Award 2010	Best Writing in a Comedy or Variety Program or Series	Jenn Engels, "Fatso Loves Lesbo"	Nominated
Gemini Award 2010	Best Writing in a Comedy or Variety Program or Series	Marvin Kaye and Chris Sheasgreen, "Third Death's the Charm"	Won
Gemini Award 2010	Best Individual Performance in a Comedy Program or Series	Benjamin Arthur, "That's Somebody's Knish!"	Won
Gemini Award 2010	Best Individual Performance in a Comedy Program or Series	Lisa Durupt, "Road Trip"	Nominated
Gemini Award 2010	Best Individual Performance in a Comedy Program or Series	Wendel Meldrum, "I Am Somewhere"	Nominated
Gemini Award 2010	Best Achievement in Main Title Design	Trevor Hembrey, Adam Shaheen, Ian Tucker	Nominated
ACTRA Toronto Award 2011	Outstanding Performance — Male	Maury Chaykin	Won
WGC Screenwriting Award 2011	Best TV Comedy	Chris Sheasgreen, "Coming Home"	Won
WGC Screenwriting Award 2011	Best TV Comedy	Garry Campbell and Jen Beasle, "The Deluge"	Nominated
WGC Screenwriting Award 2011	Best TV Comedy	Jenn Engels, "Fatso Loves Lesbo"	Nominated
Canadian Comedy Award 2011	Best TV Show	Less Than Kind	Nominated
Canadian Comedy Award 2011	Best Performance by a Female – Television	Brooke Palsson	Won
Canadian Comedy Award 2011	Best Direction – Television Program or Series	James Dunnison, "That's Somebody's Knish!"	Won
DGC Team Achievement Award 2011	Best Television Series – Comedy	"That's Somebody's Knish!"	Nominated
Young Artist Awards 2011	Best Leading Young Actor – Television Comedy or Drama	Jesse Comacho	Nominated
Leo Award 2012	Best Supporting Performance in a Music, Comedy, or Variety Program or Series	Benjamin Arthur, "March Fourth"	Won
Canadian Comedy Award 2012	Best Performance by an Ensemble – Television	Less Than Kind	Nominated
Canadian Comedy Award 2012	Best Direction – Television Program or Series	Mark McKinney, "March Fourth"	Won
Directors Guild of Canada Award 2012	Best Television Series — Comedy	"Fugue State"	Nominated
Directors Guild of Canada Award 2012	Best Picture Editing — Television Series	"Fugue State"	Nominated
Canadian Screen Award 2013	Best Comedy Series	Less Than Kind	Won
Canadian Screen Award 2014	Best Direction in a Comedy Program	Kelly Malkin, "Fight and Flight"	Won
Canadian Screen Award 2014	Best Actress - Comedy Series	Nancy Morel, "Before The End Begins"	Nominated
Canadian Screen Award 2014	Best Actress - Comedy Series	Wendel Meldrum, "I'm Only Nineteen"	Nominated
