= Black Fox (miniseries) =

- DVD cover
- Genre: Western
- Based on: Black Fox by Matt Braun
- Screenplay by: John Binder; Michael Michaelian; Jeb Rosebrook; Joe Byrne
- Directed by: Steven Hilliard Stern
- Starring: Christopher Reeve; Raoul Trujillo; Tony Todd; Nancy Sorel
- Theme music composer: Eric N. Robertson
- Country of origin: United States
- Original language: English
- No. of episodes: 3

Production
- Executive producers: Tony Allard; Robert Halmi Jr.; Norman S. Powell
- Producer: Les Kimber
- Production locations: CL Ranch - 45001 Township Road, Calgary, Alberta, Canada
- Cinematography: Frank Tidy
- Editor: Ron Wisman
- Running time: 278 minutes
- Production companies: Black Fox Productions; Western International Communications Ltd.; Cabin Fever Entertainment

Original release
- Network: CBS
- Release: July 28 – August 11, 1995

Black Fox is a 1995 American Western television miniseries based on Matt Braun's 1973 novel of the same name starring Christopher Reeve, Raoul Trujillo, Tony Todd, and Nancy Sorel. The miniseries was presented in three parts on CBS.

== Plot ==
Black Fox tells the story of two "blood" brothers, Alan and Britt Johnson—one a former plantation owner, the other his childhood friend whom he freed from slavery—who, with their families, leave Carolina to settle in Texas in the 1860s in hopes of finding a new life. Alan and Britt, along with other pioneer families, are homesteading on the West Texas frontier.

With the outbreak of the Civil War, word arrives that two Indian tribes, the Comanches and the Kiowas, have joined forces under the leadership of Little Buffalo, whose goal is to drive the white man out of Texas.

In a surprise raid, while the men are away making preparations to defend their homes, the Indians attack, taking hostage every woman and child they can find. While not all the settlers agree, it is decided that because he is black, Britt will have the best chance to negotiate with the Indians for the return of their families and he takes off, alone, for a journey deep into hostile Indian territory.

== Cast ==
- Christopher Reeve as Alan Johnson
- Raoul Trujillo as Running Dog
- Tony Todd as Britt Johnson / Black Fox
- Nancy Sorel as Sarah Johnson
- Janet Bailey as Mary Johnson
- Rainbow Sun Francks as Frank Johnson
- Chris Wiggins as Ralph Holtz
- Dale Wilson as Captain Buck Barry
- Lawrence Dane as Colonel McKensie
- Cynthia Preston as Delores Holtz / Morning Star
- Don S. Davis as Sergeant
- Kim Coates as Natchez John Dunn
- Kelly Rowan as Hallie Russell
- David Fox as Carl Glenn

== Production ==
=== Crew ===
It was directed by Steven Hilliard Stern. The adaptation was written by John Binder, Michael Michaelian, Jeb Rosebrook and Joe Byrne.

=== Filming ===
The series was filmed in 1993, but wasn't broadcast until 1995. Most of the series was filmed in Alberta, Canada.

== Episodes ==
No.	Title	Directed by	Written by	Original release date
1	"Black Fox"	Steven Hilliard Stern	John Binder	July 28, 1995
2	"Black Fox: The Price of Peace"	Steven Hilliard Stern	John Binder, Jeb Rosebrook & Joe Byrne	August 4, 1995
3	"Black Fox: Good Men and Bad"	Steven Hilliard Stern	John Binder & Michael Michaelian	August 11, 1995

== Reception ==
TV Guide called Black Fox "a sturdy but not truly outstanding sagebrush miniseries" and says it is "admirable for its decision to craft a straightforward saga with serious undertones, this canters, but does not gallop, down a trail of Wild West formulas."
