= We Interrupt This Broadcast =

1998 book by Joe Garner

- Author: Joe Garner
- Language: English
- Publisher: Sourcebooks
- Publication date: October 1998 (first edition)
- Publication place: United States
- ISBN: 1-57071-328-6
- OCLC: 38916595

We Interrupt This Broadcast is the title of a non-fiction book from 1998. It was written by Joe Garner; the foreword was written by the veteran American newscaster Walter Cronkite. In addition to many descriptions and pictures of notable news events from the 20th century, compact discs containing audio news clips from the events described in the book are also included. The audio portions are narrated by Bill Kurtis.

The phrase "we interrupt this broadcast" has been used frequently by radio and television networks when breaking into a program in progress to deliver important news or information. The description on the book jacket states: "Wherever we may happen to be, our lives stop for a moment, and we experience those few seconds of anxiety between the interruption and the actual announcement of what has happened."

== Editions ==
The first edition of We Interrupt This Broadcast was published in October 1998. A second edition was published in May 2000, and a third edition came out in May 2002. Both of these editions were revised to include more recent events, and both included two CDs. A fourth "10th Anniversary Edition" was published in October 2008, and in addition to summarizing more recent events, this edition contains three CDs instead of two.

The book has been ranked on The New York Times list of best-selling multimedia books.

== Events ==
The first edition of We Interrupt This Broadcast details, in chronological order, 38 notable events from the 20th century. Each event is chronicled in the book in words and pictures, and each has a corresponding audio track on one of the CDs containing narration by Bill Kurtis and snippets from network radio and television newscasts. The events described in the first edition are:

1. "The Hindenburg Explodes" (May 6, 1937)
2. "Pearl Harbor Under Attack" (December 7, 1941)
3. "D-Day: The Normandy Invasion" (June 6, 1944)
4. "President Roosevelt Dies" (April 12, 1945)
5. "V-E Day: War in Europe Ends" (May 7, 1945)
6. "Atomic Bomb Destroys Hiroshima" (August 6, 1945)
7. "Japan Surrenders: WWII Ends" (August 15, 1945)
8. "Truman Defeats Dewey" (November 3, 1948)
9. "General MacArthur Fired" (April 11, 1951)
10. "Sputnik Launched by Soviets" (October 4, 1957)
11. "John Glenn Orbits Earth" (February 20, 1962)
12. "Marilyn Monroe Dies" (August 4, 1962)
13. "Cuban Missile Crisis: Nuclear War Threatened" (October 22, 1962)
14. "President Kennedy Assassinated" (November 22, 1963)
15. "Lee Harvey Oswald Assassinated" (November 24, 1963)
16. "President Johnson Declines Re-election Bid" (March 31, 1968)
17. "Martin Luther King Jr. Assassinated" (April 4, 1968)
18. "Robert Kennedy Assassinated" (June 4, 1968)
19. "Apollo 11: Man Walks on Moon" (July 20, 1969)
20. "Apollo 13: Astronauts Escape Disaster" (April 13, 1970)
21. "Kent State Massacre" (May 4, 1970)
22. "Munich Olympics Tragedy" (September 5, 1972)
23. "Nixon Resigns" (August 8, 1974)
24. "Saigon Falls" (April 30, 1975)
25. "Elvis Dies" (August 16, 1977)
26. "Iran Hostage Crisis" (November 4, 1979)
27. "John Lennon Murdered" (December 8, 1980)
28. "President Reagan Shot" (March 30, 1981)
29. "The Challenger Explodes" (January 28, 1986)
30. "Berlin Wall Crumbles" (November 9, 1989)
31. "Operation Desert Storm Begins" (January 29, 1991)
32. "Rodney King Verdict Incites Riots" (April 29, 1992)
33. "Waco Standoff Ends in Disaster" (April 19, 1993)
34. "O.J. Simpson Saga" (June 13, 1994 to February 4, 1997)
35. "Oklahoma City Bombing" (April 19, 1995)
36. "Flight 800 Explodes Over Atlantic" (July 17, 1996)
37. "Atlanta Olympics Bombing" (July 27, 1996)
38. "Princess Diana Dies" (August 31, 1997)

The second edition, released in 2000, features the above events, plus...

1. "The Impeachment of President Clinton" (December 19, 1998)
2. "Tragedy at Columbine High School" (April 20, 1999)
3. "John F. Kennedy Jr. Dies" (July 16, 1999)

The third edition, released in 2002, features the above events, plus...

1. "The 2000 Election" (November 7, 2000)
2. "America Under Attack" (September 11, 2001)

In 2008, a fourth edition was released. This most recent version was released with 3 CD's, featuring the above events, plus...

1. "Operation Iraqi Freedom Begins" (March 20, 2003)
2. "Hurricane Katrina Floods New Orleans" (August 29, 2005)
3. "The Virginia Tech Massacre" (April 16, 2007)
