= James Dunnison =

Canadian film director

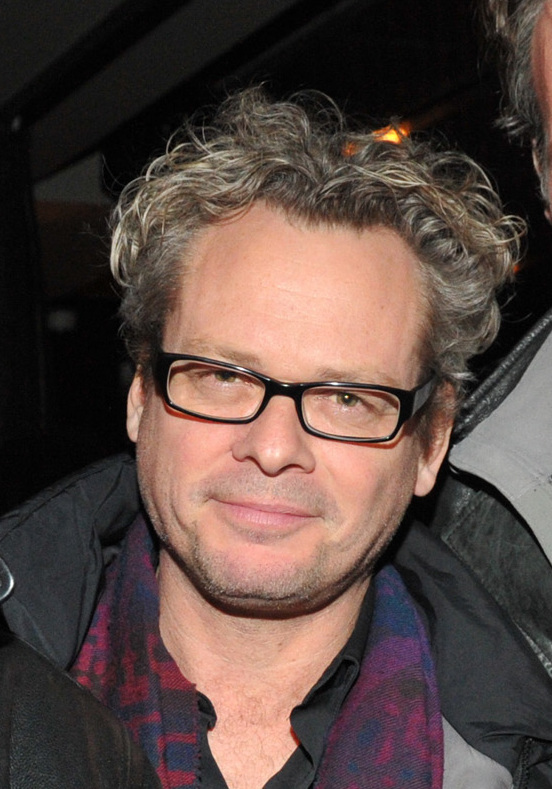
Dunnison at the CFC Actors Conservatory Showcase (5451768222)

James Dunnison is a Canadian film and television director, whose works include Stuff, Todd and the Book of Pure Evil (7 episodes), and Less Than Kind (14 episodes), as well as individual episodes of Carter, Bitten, Blood Ties, Hiccups, Arctic Air, Godiva’s, Whistler and Robson Arms. In 1998, he took the Grand Prize at the Cabbagetown Short Film & Video Festival, and he has additionally received the General Idea Award for Artistic Contribution to AIDS Awareness, three Gemini Awards, three Directors Guild of Canada Awards, two Canadian Comedy Awards and multiple Leo Awards.
