= The New Explorers =

1990s American documentary series

The New Explorers is an American documentary television series on PBS produced in the 1990s that was hosted by Bill Kurtis.

== Awards ==
- The series won the Bronze Wrangler at the Western Heritage Awards in 1999 for an episode "The New Explorers: Betrayal At Little Big Horn".
- The series won a Peabody Award in 1993.
