= Kay Toliver =

Teacher

Kay Toliver

Kay Toliver is a teacher specialising in mathematics education.

== Background ==
Kay Toliver was born and raised in East Harlem and the South Bronx. A product of the New York City public school system, she graduated from Harriet Beecher Stowe Junior High, Walton High School and Hunter College (AB 1967, MA 1971) with graduate work at the City College of New York in mathematics.

For more than 30 years, Kay Toliver taught mathematics and communication arts at P.S. 72/East Harlem Tech in Community School District 4. Prior to instructing seventh and eighth grade students, she taught grades one through six for 15 years.

"Becoming a teacher was the fulfillment of a childhood dream. My parents always stressed that education was the key to a better life. By becoming a teacher, I hoped to inspire African-American and Hispanic youths to realize their own dreams. I wanted to give something back to the communities I grew up in."

At East Harlem Tech, with the support of her principal, she established the "Challenger" program. The program, for grades 4-8, presents the basics of geometry and algebra in an integrated curriculum. This is a program for "gifted" students, but following her belief that all children can learn, she accepted students from all ability levels.

== Teaching methods ==
=== The Math Fair ===
These events are similar to science fairs but involve students in creating and displaying projects relating to mathematics. Participants had to be able to explain thoroughly the mathematical theories and concepts behind their projects, which were placed on display at the school so that students from the lower grades could examine the older students' research. Students have created mathematic games such as "Dunking for Prime Numbers," "Fishing for Palindromes," and "Black Jack Geometry."

=== The Math Trail ===
Kay Toliver developed a lesson called the "Math Trail" to give students an appreciation for the community as well as an opportunity to see mathematics at work. To create a Math Trail, the class must first do some research on the history of the community. Then, they are instructed to plot a course, starting from the school building, that leads the class through the community and back to school, with stops along the way to visit several sites and create math problems about various real-life situations.

== Teaching Honors ==
- Presidential Awardee Secondary Mathematics, State and National levels
- Reliance Award for Excellence in Education, Middle School
- Outstanding Teacher for Mathematics Instruction, Disney American Teacher Awards
- Fellow of FAME (Foundation for the Advancement of Mathematics Education)
- Featured in the Peabody Award-winning PBS special, "Good Morning Miss Toliver," and the Peabody Award-winning classroom series, "The Eddie Files".
- Outstanding Educator of the Year, National Conference on Diversity in the Scientific and Technological Workforce (National Science Foundation).
- Kilby Award
- Essence Award
