= Bill Kurtis =

American television journalist (born 1940)

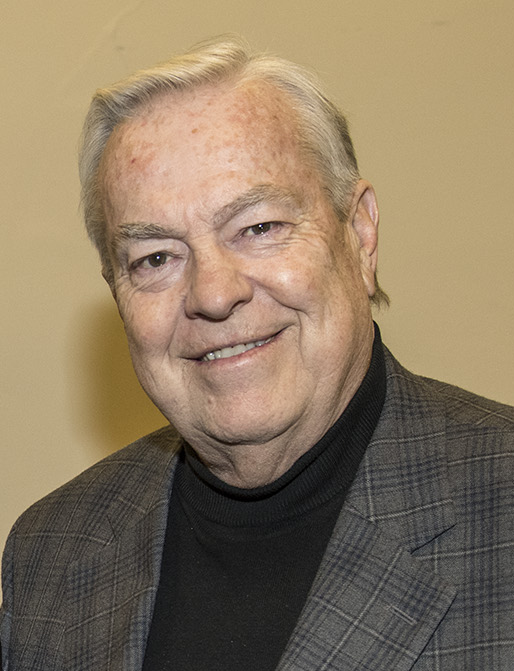
- Kurtis in 2016
- Born: William Horton Kuretich; September 21, 1940 (age 86); Pensacola, Florida, US
- Education: University of Kansas (BS); Washburn University (JD)
- Occupations: Broadcast journalist; producer; narrator
- Years active: 1966–present
- Employers: WBBM-TV; A&E (TV network); AT&T Mobility; Decades
- Notable credits: WBBM-TV, The CBS Morning News, CBS Early Morning News, Investigative Reports, American Justice, and Cold Case Files
- Board member of: Kurtis Productions
- Spouses: Helen Kurtis (m. 1963; died 1977) Donna La Pietra (m. 2017)
- Children: 2
- Relatives: Jean Schodorf (sister), Frank Kurtis (first cousin once removed)
- Website: kurtis.com

Bill Kurtis (born William Horton Kuretich; September 21, 1940) is an American retired television journalist, television producer, narrator, and news anchor.

Kurtis was studying to become a lawyer in the 1960s, when he was asked to fill in on a temporary news assignment at WIBW-TV in Topeka, Kansas. His reporting on a devastating tornado outbreak led to a position as on-air news reporter and, later, a successful career as a news anchor in Chicago. He has been noted for his sonorous voice throughout his career. In the early 1980s, he anchored The CBS Morning News in New York City and became especially interested in investigative in-depth reports and documentaries. When he returned to Chicago and for a time resumed his anchor duties, he also founded a production company, Kurtis Productions.

Kurtis hosted or produced a number of crime and news documentary shows, including Investigative Reports, American Justice, and Cold Case Files. Kurtis served as the scorekeeper/announcer for National Public Radio (NPR)'s news comedy/quiz show Wait Wait... Don't Tell Me! from 2014 until 2026 and the host of Through the Decades, a documentary-style news magazine on Decades (now Catchy Comedy).

== Early life ==
William Horton Kuretich was born on September 21, 1940, in Pensacola, Florida, to Wilma Mary Horton (1911–2002) and William A. Kuretich (Croatian: Kuretić), of Croatian origin (1914–2001), a United States Marine Corps brigadier general and decorated veteran of World War II. His father's military career included extensive travel for his family. Upon his retirement, the family settled in Independence, Kansas.

Kurtis' sister is former Kansas state Senate Majority Whip Jean Schodorf, of Wichita, Kansas.

At age 16, Kurtis began working as an announcer for KIND, a radio station in Independence. He graduated from Independence High School in 1958, the University of Kansas with a Bachelor of Science degree in journalism in 1962 and he earned a Juris Doctor degree from Washburn University School of Law in 1966. While in law school, Kurtis worked part-time at WIBW-TV in Topeka, Kansas. After passing the Kansas bar examination and accepting a job with a Wichita law firm, Kurtis discussed his options with Harry Colmery and Bob McClure of Colmery and Russell and decided not to pursue a career in law.

Kurtis served as an enlisted man in the United States Marine Corps Reserve (Topeka, Kansas 1962–1966). He was commissioned a lieutenant (j.g.) in the United States Navy Reserve (Chicago, 1966–1969).

== Career ==
=== Television career ===
On the evening of June 8, 1966, Kurtis left a bar review class at Washburn to fill in at WIBW-TV to anchor the 6 o'clock news. Severe weather was approaching Topeka, so Kurtis stayed to update the weather reports. At 7:00 p.m., while on the air, a tornado was sighted by WIBW cameraman Ed Rutherford southwest of the city. Within 15 seconds another sighting came in: "It's wiped out an apartment complex." Kurtis's warning – "For God's sake, take cover" – became synonymous with the tornado outbreak sequence of June 1966 that left 18 dead and injured hundreds more. Kurtis and the WIBW broadcast team remained on the air for 24 straight hours to cover the tornado and its aftermath. As the only television station in town and one of the few radio stations left undamaged, WIBW became a communications hub for emergency operations. The experience changed Kurtis's career path from law to broadcast news. Within three months of seeing his work covering the tornado, WBBM-TV in Chicago hired Kurtis and set the stage for a 30-year career with CBS.

The year 1966 in Chicago was the beginning of a tumultuous four years, and as a reporter and anchor Kurtis was in the middle of historic events. He covered the neighborhood fires that followed the assassination of Martin Luther King Jr. and again when Robert F. Kennedy was shot. Protests against the Vietnam War dominated the 1968 Democratic National Convention in Chicago, which Kurtis covered. In 1969, Kurtis produced a documentary about Iva Toguri D'Aquino, "Tokyo Rose", the first interview since her conviction for treason in 1949. His reporting, along with that of Ron Yates of the Chicago Tribune, helped persuade President Gerald Ford to pardon her in 1977. His legal education came into play when he covered the Chicago Seven conspiracy trial in 1969, which led to a job with CBS News in Los Angeles as correspondent. One of his first assignments was covering the Charles Manson murder trial for 10 months. He also covered the murder trials of Angela Davis and Juan Corona and the Pentagon Papers trial of Daniel Ellsberg.

In 1973, Kurtis returned to Chicago to co-anchor the 10 p.m. newscast with Walter Jacobson at WBBM-TV. In 1978, his investigative unit broke the story of Agent Orange, a defoliant sprayed on U.S. soldiers in Vietnam. After a dramatic screening of the documentary in Washington, D.C., the Veterans Administration issued guidelines to diagnose and compensate those veterans affected by Agent Orange. Kurtis returned to Vietnam in 1980 to cover the Vietnamese side of the story and while there, discovered some 15,000 Vietnamese children conceived and left behind by Americans when the U.S. left in 1975. A story Kurtis wrote for The New York Times Magazine was instrumental in obtaining special status for the children to immigrate to the United States.

In 1982, Kurtis joined Diane Sawyer on The CBS Morning News, the network broadcast from New York City. The two were also on the CBS Early Morning News, which aired an hour earlier on most CBS stations. He also anchored three CBS Reports: The Plane That Fell from the Sky, The Golden Leaf, and The Gift of Life.

He returned to WBBM-TV in 1985. In 1986, Kurtis hosted a four-part science series on PBS called The Miracle Planet as well as a four-part series in 1987 on the Central Intelligence Agency. He formed his own documentary production company, Kurtis Productions, in 1988, the same year he produced "Back to Chernobyl" for the PBS series Nova. Kurtis narrated nearly 1,000 documentaries, and Kurtis Productions produced nearly 500 documentaries for series such as The New Explorers on PBS; Investigative Reports and Cold Case Files for A&E; and Investigating History for the History Channel. He also hosted American Justice, produced by Towers Productions. For CNBC, the company has produced over 200 episodes of American Greed.

In 1994, Kurtis obtained a videotape showing Richard Speck, convicted of murdering eight student nurses in Chicago in 1966, having jailhouse sex and using drugs within the maximum security facility known as Stateville Correctional Center in Joliet, Illinois. He aired a report on WBBM-TV and produced a documentary for A&E Network, resulting in the most sweeping changes to the Illinois penal system in its history.

Kurtis re-teamed with Walter Jacobson in 2010 to host WBBM-TV's 6 p.m. newscast; they had co-hosted the station's dominant 10 p.m. newscast from 1973 until Kurtis's move in 1982 to The CBS Morning News. After achieving the hoped-for ratings boost, Kurtis and Jacobson retired as news anchors in 2013.

Kurtis has received two Peabody Awards, numerous Emmy Awards, awards from the Overseas Press Club, and a DuPont Award. He has been inducted into the Illinois and Kansas Halls of Fame. In 1998, he was awarded the University of Kansas William Allen White citation.

He is the narrator of a 1998 multimedia book by Joe Garner, We Interrupt This Broadcast, with a foreword by Walter Cronkite and an epilogue by Brian Williams, which was a sequel to the Edward R. Murrow record album I Can Hear It Now. Kurtis has authored three books: On Assignment (1984), Death Penalty on Trial (2004), and Prairie Table Cookbook (2008).

In June 2015, Kurtis commenced lead hosting duties of Through the Decades, a daily news magazine that covers historical events from that particular day since the advent of television. His co-hosts are reporters Kerry Sayers and Ellee Pai Hong. The program ended when Decades was rebranded to Catchy Comedy in February 2023.

=== Film work ===
Kurtis narrated the 2010 documentary film Carbon Nation by Peter Byck and was the narrator in the 2004 film starring Will Ferrell, Anchorman: The Legend of Ron Burgundy and its sequel Anchorman 2: The Legend Continues (2013).

On July 8, 2013, Kurtis was named the Voice of Illinois Tourism.

=== Wait Wait... Don't Tell Me! ===
On several occasions starting in 2009, Kurtis appeared on NPR's news quiz show Wait Wait... Don't Tell Me!, filling in for regular announcer Carl Kasell. He replaced Kasell on a permanent basis on May 24, 2014. One segment of the show has Kurtis reading out three news-related limericks with the last word or phrase missing for contestants to fill in.

In March 2026, executive producer Mike Danforth announced Kurtis would retire after the May 23 show. He was succeeded by Alzo Slade.

== In popular culture ==
Author Randy Shilts decided to write his seminal 1987 book And the Band Played On: Politics, People, and The AIDS Epidemic after attending an awards ceremony in 1983. As described in the book, Kurtis gave the keynote address and told a joke: "What's the hardest part about having AIDS? Trying to convince your wife that you're Haitian." Shilts believed the joke exemplified the "business as usual" treatment of AIDS in government and media.

In the animated series South Park, Eric Cartman owns a board game called "Investigative Reports with Bill Kurtis", featuring a talking Bill Kurtis bust. The boys can be seen playing the game in South Park's season four episode "Cartman Joins NAMBLA" (2000) and season eight episode "Up the Down Steroid" (2004). The game can also be seen on the shelf of a hobby store in the episode "Cock Magic" (2014).

Kurtis also contributed a spoken-word introduction to The Dandy Warhols' 2005 album Odditorium or Warlords of Mars.

The Shrine of Christ's Passion, an interactive half-mile winding pathway of 40 life-size bronze statues depicting the Stations of the Cross that opened in June 2008, features a description of each scene and a short meditation recorded by Kurtis.

== Personal life ==
Kurtis and his wife, Helen, had two children, a daughter and a son. Mary Kristen was born in 1966, and Scott in 1970. Kurtis's wife Helen died at age 36 of breast cancer on June 11, 1977, in Omaha, Nebraska. He married his partner of 40 years, former Chicago TV news producer Donna La Pietra, on December 13, 2017. La Pietra was a partner with Kurtis in his Kurtis Productions company. Kurtis has homes in the Lincoln Park neighborhood of Chicago and in Mettawa, Illinois.

Kurtis and his sister, Jean Schodorf, inherited the historic site of the Little House on the Prairie as designated by the State of Kansas. It is now a not-for-profit museum with their grandmother's one-room schoolhouse, a tiny post office from Wayside, Kansas, a homesteader's farmhouse, and attendant farm buildings.

Kurtis's father was a cousin of Frank Kurtis, who is in the Indianapolis 500 Hall of Fame.

Kurtis' son, Scott, died on July 20, 2009, at age 38 at the Kansas cattle ranch owned by his father. Scott Kurtis was known to have suffered from paranoid schizophrenia since his mid-teens.

In 2005, Kurtis founded Tallgrass Beef Company, which raised and distributed grass-fed, hormone-free organic beef. Some of the beef sold came from cattle raised on Kurtis's ranch in Sedan, Kansas. On July 15, 2013, Tallgrass Beef Company, LLC forfeited its registration with the Kansas Secretary of State to do business in the state of Kansas.

== Writing credits ==
- Bill Kurtis on Assignment published October 1, 1983, by Rand McNally; ISBN 0-528-81005-7
- The Death Penalty on Trial: Crisis in American Justice about the death penalty was published November 30, 2004, by PublicAffairs; ISBN 1-58648-169-X
- Prairie Table Cookbook, with Michelle M. Martin, published 2007-12-11 by Sourcebooks, Inc., ISBN 978-1-4022-1049-5

== See also ==
- Peter Sagal
