= Nancy Sorel =

Canadian-American actress

- Born: May 14, 1964; Fall River, Massachusetts
- Occupation: Actress
- Years active: 1987–present
- Spouse: Paul Magel (m. 2000)
- Children: 2

Nancy Sorel is a Canadian-American actress.

== Life and career ==
Sorel was born May 14, 1964 in Fall River, Massachusetts and was raised there as well. She received a degree in Theatre and Film from the University of Massachusetts Amherst. After graduation she went to New York City and began her acting career starring in Off-Broadway plays, commercials, and television, making her debut in the ABC soap opera All My Children playing a bit part. From 1988 to 1989 she played the role of Coco Lane on the ABC daytime soap opera, One Life to Live. Sorel later starred as Monique McCallum in the NBC soap opera, Generations from 1989 to 1991. Sorel later moved to prime time television, playing guest-starring roles on Matlock, Jake and the Fatman, Street Justice, Doogie Howser, M.D., Murder, She Wrote and Beverly Hills, 90210. From 1992 to 1993 she was regular cast member in the short-lived Fox sitcom, Down the Shore.

Sorel starred opposite Christopher Reeve in the 1995 three-part television miniseries Black Fox. She later appeared in the made-for-television movies such as In the Lake of the Woods (1996) and Up, Up and Away (2000), and guest-starred on The X-Files, The Outer Limits, 'Da Vinci's Inquest, The Twilight Zone, Stargate SG-1 and The 4400. From 2008 to 2012, Sorel starred as Clara Fine in the Canadian comedy-drama series, Less Than Kind. In 2009, she won a Canadian Comedy Awards for her performance. In 2014, she received Canadian Screen Award for Best Supporting Actress in a Comedy Series nomination. From 2009 to 2014 she also starred in the comedy series Cashing In (since 2009). From 2016 to 2018 she had a recurring role as Mary Dawson in the Amazon Prime Video series The Man in the High Castle. In film, Sorel appeared in Heaven Is for Real (2014), Breakthrough (2019), The Grudge (2020) and Ordinary Angels (2024).

Sorel is married to actor Paul Magel. They reside in Winnipeg, Canada and have two children.

== Filmography ==
=== Film ===
Year	Title	Role	Notes
1992	Crow's Nest	Annie Corssetti	
1997	I Love You, Don't Touch Me!	Elizabeth	
2006	Goose on the Loose	Hazel McQuaig	
2012	Rufus	Vickie	
2014	Heaven Is for Real	Dr. Charlotte Slater	
2016	Considering Love and Other Magic	Linda	
2018	How It Ends	Sonographer	
2019	Breakthrough	Mrs. Abbott	
2019	A Dog's Journey	Ringo's Owner	
2020	The Grudge	Agent Cole	
2024	Ordinary Angels	Virginia	

=== Television ===
Year	Title	Role	Notes
1988-89	One Life to Live	Coco Lane	TV series
1989	Generations	Monique McCallum	TV series
1991	Matlock	Faith Gamson	"The Celebrity"
1991	Jake and the Fatman	Meredith Toomey	"Nevertheless"
1992	The Commish	Lisa	"Shoot the Breeze"
1992	Lightning Force	Dra. Morgana Finstad	"Checkup"
1992	Doogie Howser, M.D.	Roxanne Rollins	"Will the Real Dr. Howser Please Stand Up"
1992–93	Down the Shore	Sammy	Regular role
1993	Relentless: Mind of a Killer	Natalie	TV film
1993	Murder, She Wrote	Jill Walker Machio	"The Survivor"
1994	Beverly Hills, 90210	Gloria Richland	"Life after Death"
1994	Highlander: The Series	Jill	"Obsession"
1995	Empty Nest	Julie	"The Ex-Files"
1995	Black Fox	Sarah Johnson	TV miniseries
1995	The X-Files	Capt. Janet Draper	"The Walk"
1996	In the Lake of the Woods	Pat Hood	TV film
1997	The Outer Limits	Page Houghton	"New Lease"
1998	Welcome to Paradox	Cleo Lawson	"Options"
1999	Beggars and Choosers	Cyra Hampton	"Unsafe Sex"
1999–2000	Da Vinci's Inquest	Kim Leary	"His Wife", "Bring Back the Dead"
2000	Hope Island	Gwen	"20 Sailors Around a Buttonhole"
2000	Cold Squad	Stephanie	"The Good, the Bad and the Dead"
2000	Up, Up, and Away!	Mrs. Rosen	TV film
2000	The Outer Limits	Dana van Owen	"The Gun"
2000	The Man Who Used to Be Me	Dr. Beck	TV film
2000	First Wave	Susan	"The Flight of Francis Jeffries"
2001	Seven Days	Esther Simms	"The First Freshman"
2002	Haunted	Susan Mason	"Pilot"
2003	The Twilight Zone	Morgan	"Cold Fusion"
2005	Stargate SG-1	Garan	"It's Good to Be King"
2005	Tru Calling	Barbara	"Enough"
2005	The 4400	Jane Orman	"Mommy's Bosses"
2008–2012	Less Than Kind	Clara Fine	Main role
2009–2014	Cashing In	Claire Eastman	Recurring role
2010	Keep Your Head Up, Kid: The Don Cherry Story	Honey Martini	"Part 1"
2015	The Pinkertons	Marm / Madeleine McGoldrick	"In Marm's Way"
2016	The Man in the High Castle	Mary Dawson	"The Road Less Traveled", "Kintsugi", "Land O' Smiles", "Baku"
2018	Once Upon a Christmas Miracle	Kathy Krueger	TV film
2019	Merry & Bright	Sara	TV film
2019	A Mazing Winter Romance	Maggie Miller	TV film
2020	Let's Meet Again on Christmas Eve	Nancy Bennet	TV film
2023	Spencer Sisters	Marlina Briggs	Episode #1.2
