= George Roy =

American sports documentary director, producer, and editor

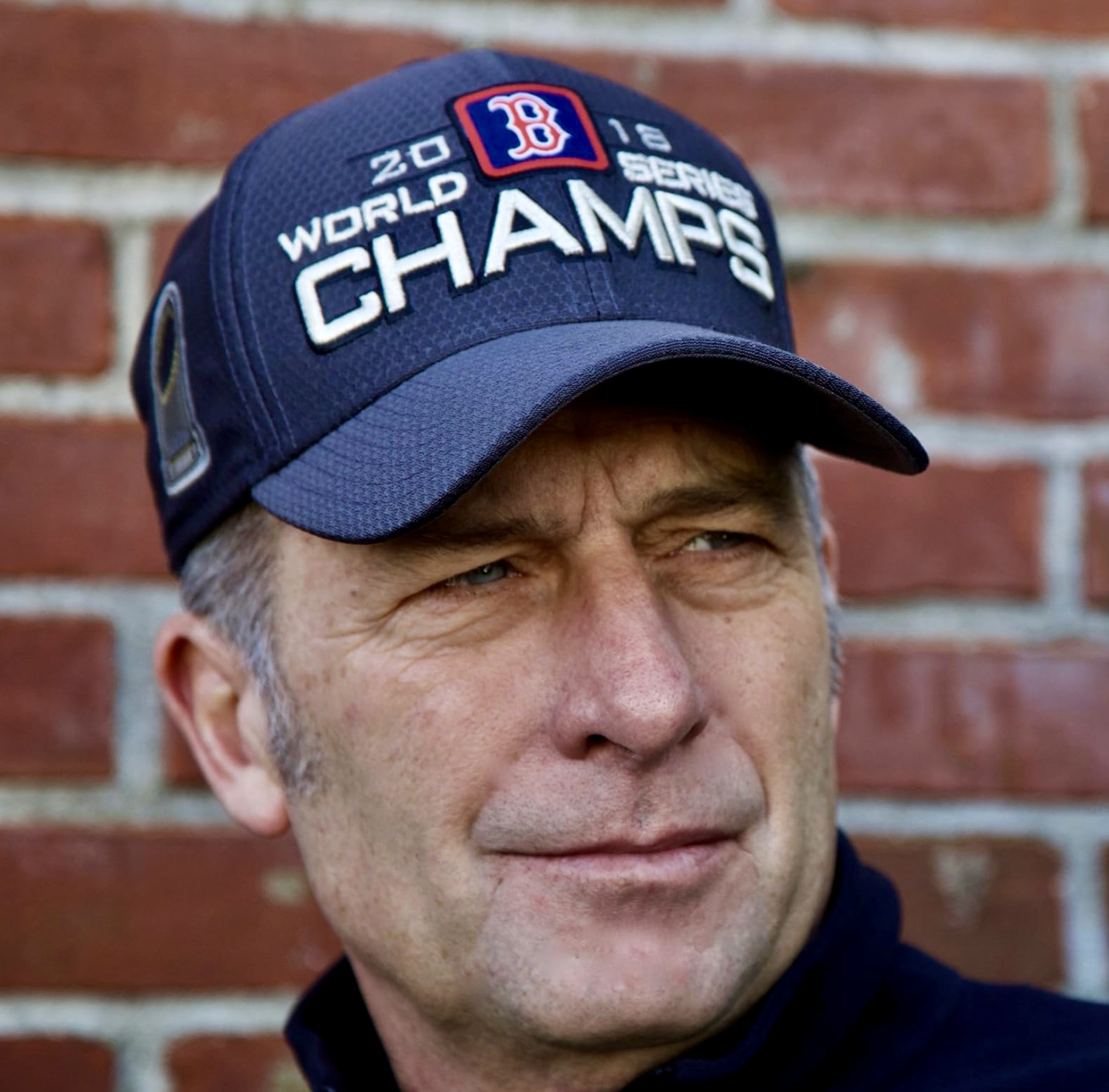
- Occupations: Director, producer, editor

George Roy is an American sports documentary director, producer, and editor. Among his twenty two films for HBO are Mantle,When it was a Game, Curse of the Bambino, Broad Street Bullies, Babe Ruth, Fists of Freedom, Hitler's Pawn, and City Dump: The Story of the 1951 CCNY Basketball Scandal. He has directed and edited numerous films for Showtime, Fox, CBS, NBC, A&E, ESPN and WWE. A graduate of Emerson College, he is the winner of six Emmys and three George F. Foster Peabody Awards.

Former founding partner of Black Canyon Productions and Flagstaff Films, in 2019 Roy founded Jersey Line Films, based in Glen Rock, New Jersey.
