= 1931 =

1931 in various calendars
- Gregorian calendar: 1931; MCMXXXI
- Ab urbe condita: 2684
- Armenian calendar: 1380; ԹՎ ՌՅՁ
- Assyrian calendar: 6681
- Baháʼí calendar: 87–88
- Balinese saka calendar: 1852–1853
- Bengali calendar: 1337–1338
- Berber calendar: 2881
- British Regnal year: 21 Geo. 5 – 22 Geo. 5
- Buddhist calendar: 2475
- Burmese calendar: 1293
- Byzantine calendar: 7439–7440
- Chinese calendar: 庚午年 (Metal Horse); 4628 or 4421 — to — 辛未年 (Metal Goat); 4629 or 4422
- Coptic calendar: 1647–1648
- Discordian calendar: 3097
- Ethiopian calendar: 1923–1924
- Hebrew calendar: 5691–5692
- Hindu calendars
- Vikram Samvat: 1987–1988
- Shaka Samvat: 1852–1853
- Kali Yuga: 5031–5032
- Holocene calendar: 11931
- Igbo calendar: 931–932
- Iranian calendar: 1309–1310
- Islamic calendar: 1349–1350
- Japanese calendar: Shōwa 6 (昭和６年)
- Javanese calendar: 1861–1862
- Juche calendar: 20
- Julian calendar: Gregorian minus 13 days
- Korean calendar: 4264
- Minguo calendar: ROC 20 民國20年
- Nanakshahi calendar: 463
- Thai solar calendar: 2473–2474
- Tibetan calendar: ལྕགས་ཕོ་རྟ་ལོ་ (male Iron-Horse); 2057 or 1676 or 904 — to — ལྕགས་མོ་ལུག་ལོ་ (female Iron-Sheep); 2058 or 1677 or 905

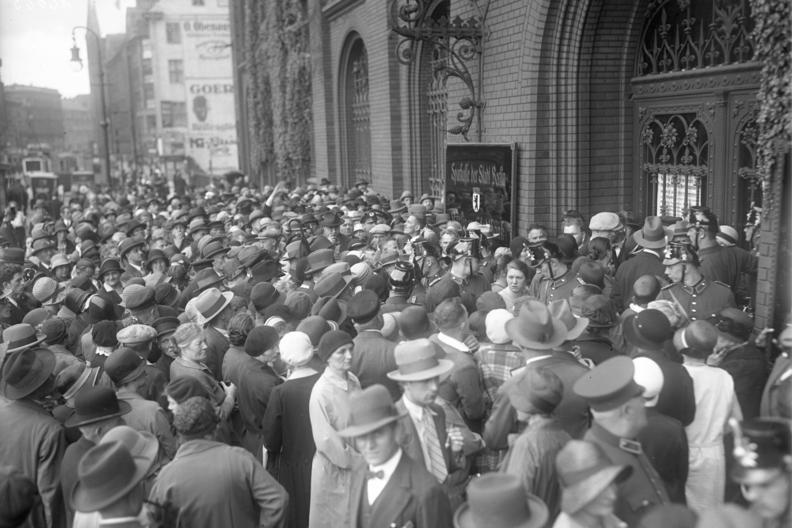
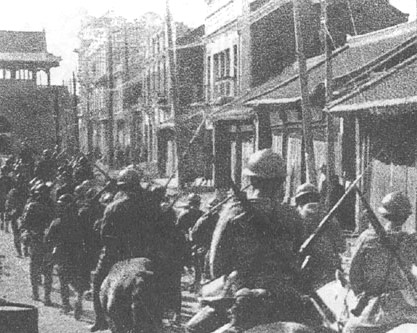
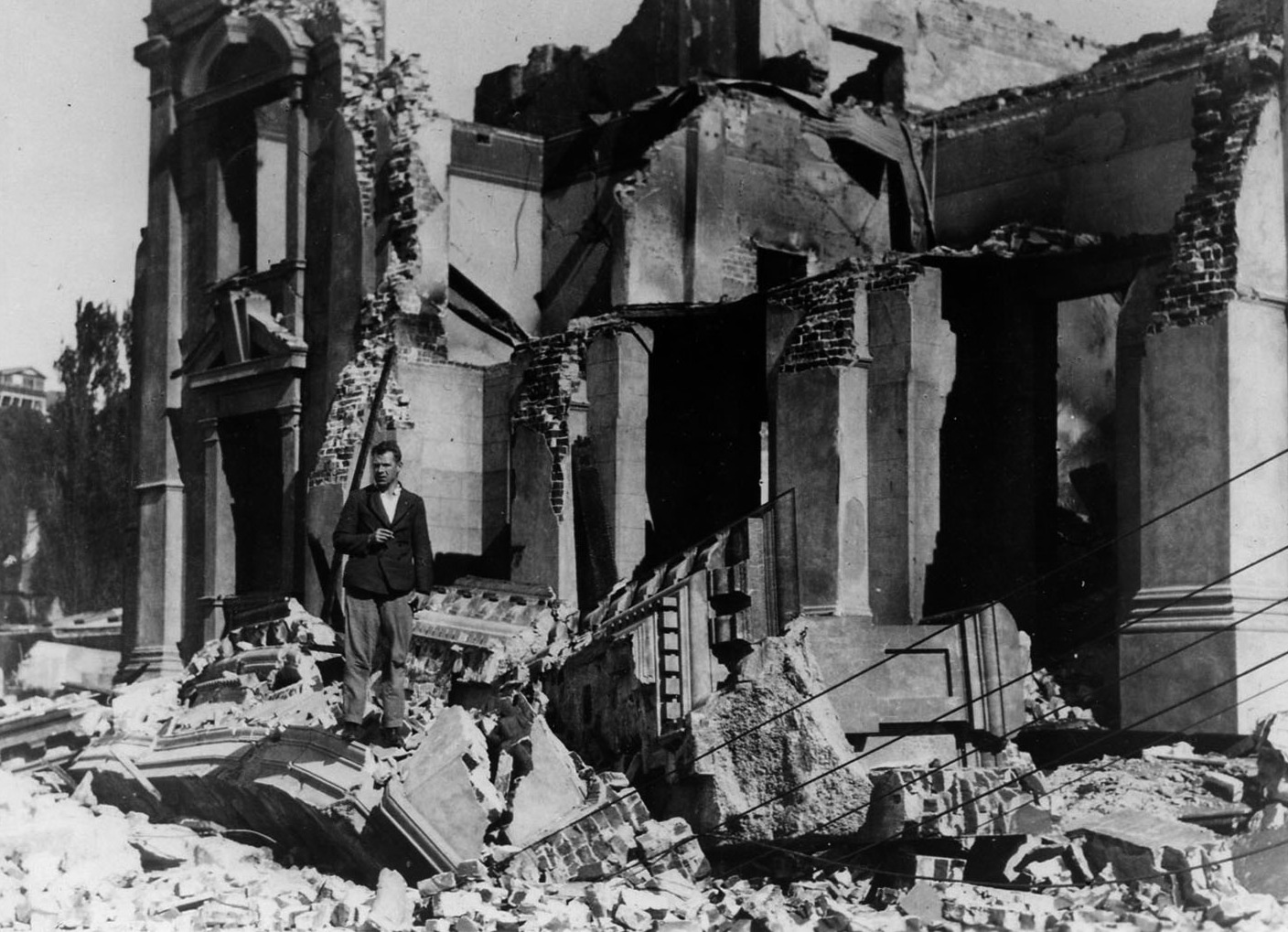
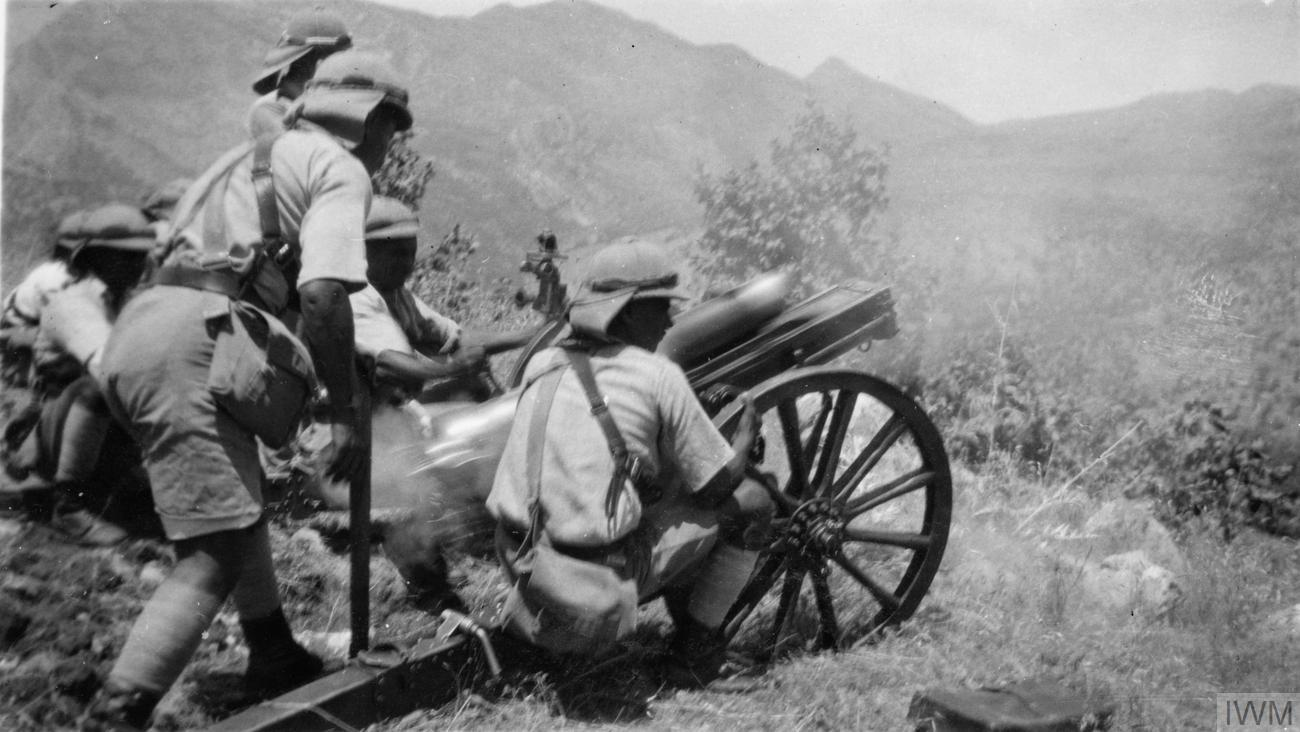
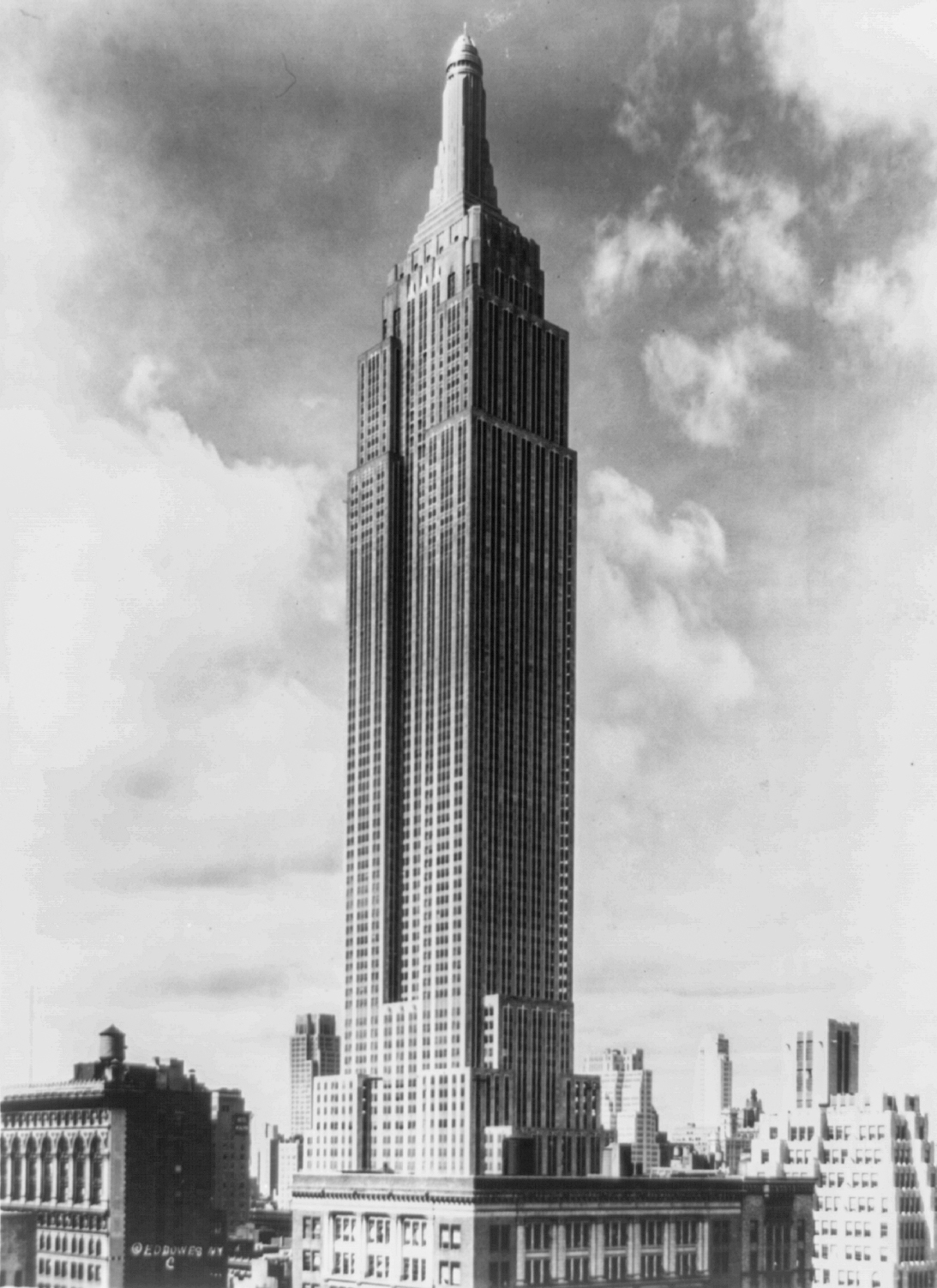
From top to bottom, left to right:
- The catastrophic 1931 China floods submerge vast regions along the Yangtze, Huai, and Yellow Rivers, killing 1–4 million and becoming one of history's deadliest natural disasters;
- The European banking crisis of 1931 begins with the collapse of Creditanstalt, spreading financial turmoil across Austria and Germany and deepening the Great Depression;
- The Mukden Incident in Manchuria sees a staged explosion by Japanese forces used to justify invasion, setting the stage for the Second Sino-Japanese War;
- The Hawke's Bay earthquake strikes New Zealand's North Island, killing 256 and prompting a massive Art Deco rebuilding of Napier;
- The Ahmed Barzani revolt erupts in northern Iraq as Kurdish forces challenge the government, highlighting ethnic tensions;
- Empire State Building opens in New York City, becoming the world's tallest skyscraper and a symbol of modern ambition.

1931 (MCMXXXI) was a common year starting on Thursday of the Gregorian calendar, the 1931st year of the Common Era (CE) and Anno Domini (AD) designations, the 931st year of the 2nd millennium, the 31st year of the 20th century, and the 2nd year of the 1930s decade.

== Events ==
=== January ===
- January 2 – South Dakota native Ernest Lawrence invents the cyclotron, used to accelerate particles to study nuclear physics.
- January 4 – German pilot Elly Beinhorn begins her flight to Africa.
- January 22 – Sir Isaac Isaacs is sworn in as the first Australian-born Governor-General of Australia.
- January 25 – Mohandas Gandhi is again released from imprisonment in India.
- January 27 – Pierre Laval forms a government in France.
- January 30 – Charlie Chaplin comedy drama film City Lights receives its public premiere at the Los Angeles Theater with Albert Einstein as guest of honor. Contrary to the current trend in cinema, it is a silent film, but with a score by Chaplin. Critically and commercially successful from the start, it will place consistently in lists of films considered the best of all time.

=== February ===
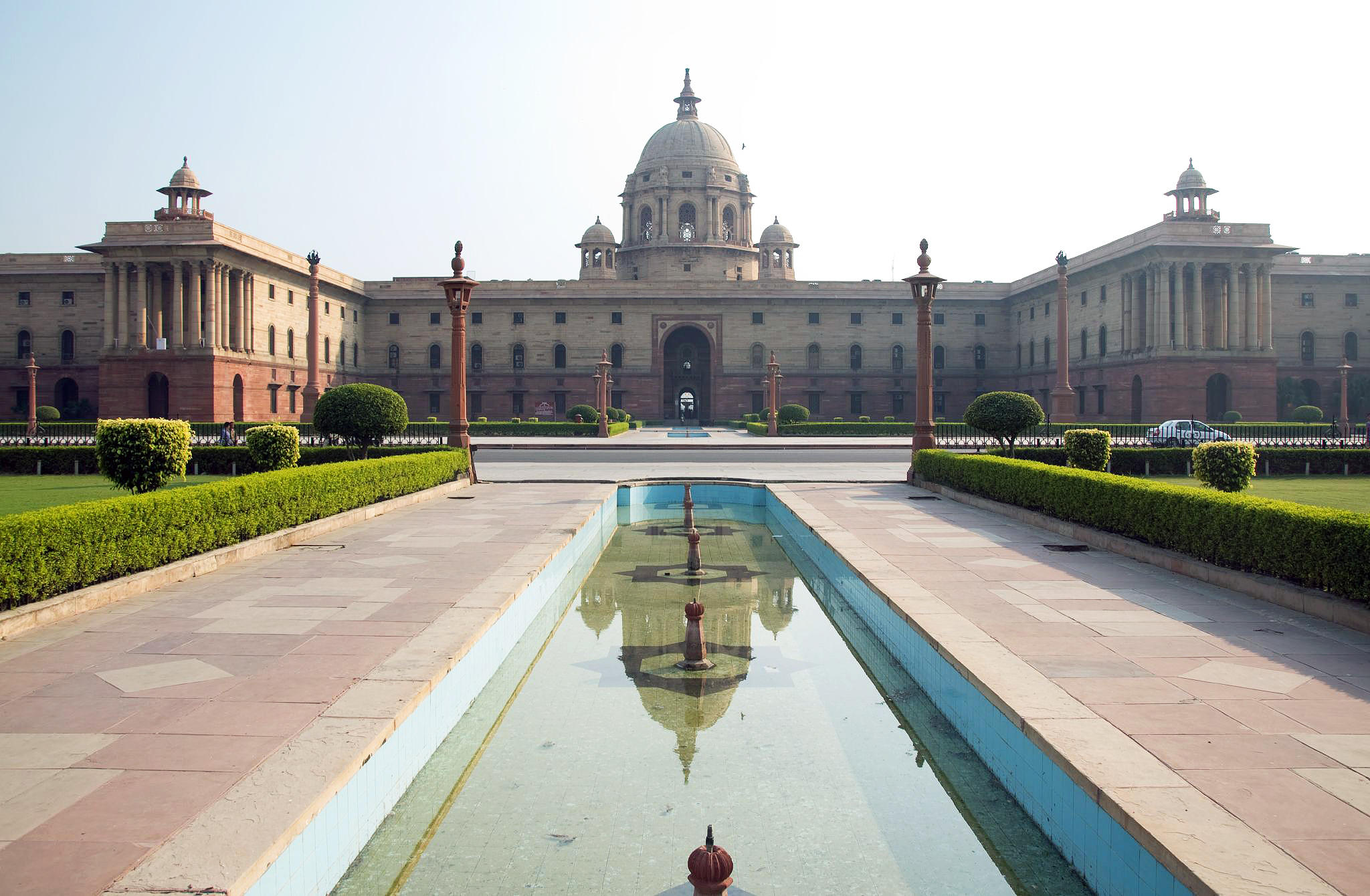
February 10: New Delhi becomes India's capital

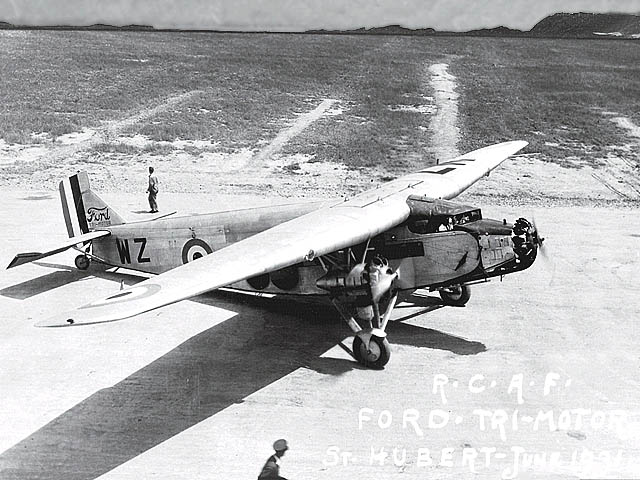
February 21: Ford Trimotor hijacked

- February 4 – Soviet leader Joseph Stalin gives a speech calling for rapid industrialization, arguing that only strong industrialized countries will win wars, while "weak" nations are "beaten". Stalin states: "We are fifty or a hundred years behind the advanced countries. We must make good this distance in ten years. Either we do it, or they will crush us." The first five-year plan in the Soviet Union is intensified, for the industrialization and collectivization of agriculture.
- February 10 – Official inauguration ceremonies for New Delhi as the capital of India begin.
- February 16 – Pehr Evind Svinhufvud is elected president of Finland.
- February 19 – The Socialist Soviet Republic of Abkhazia is dissolved and reformed as the Abkhaz Autonomous Soviet Socialist Republic, an autonomous republic of Soviet Georgia, resulting in public protests.
- February 21 – Peruvian revolutionaries hijack a Ford Trimotor aeroplane, and demand that the pilot drop propaganda leaflets over Lima.

=== March ===
- March 5 – The British viceroy of India and Mohandas Gandhi sign the Gandhi–Irwin Pact.
- March 7 – The Finnish Parliament House opens in Helsinki, Finland.
- March 11 – The Ready for Labour and Defence of the USSR programme, abbreviated as GTO, is introduced in the Soviet Union.
- March 23 – Indian revolutionary leaders Bhagat Singh, Shivaram Rajguru and Sukhdev Thapar are hanged for conspiracy to murder in the British Raj.
- March 31 – An earthquake destroys Managua, Nicaragua, killing 2,000 people.

=== April ===
- April 1 – The Second Encirclement Campaign against Jiangxi Soviet in China is launched by the Kuomintang government, to destroy the Communist forces in Jiangxi Province.
- April 6 – The Portuguese government declares martial law in Madeira and in the Azores, because of the Madeira uprising in Funchal.
- April 12 – Municipal elections in Spain, which are treated as a virtual referendum on the monarchy, result in the triumph for the republican parties.
- April 14 – The Second Spanish Republic is proclaimed in Madrid. Meanwhile, as a result of the victory of the Republican Left of Catalonia, Francesc Macià proclaims in Barcelona the Catalan Republic, as a state of the Iberian Federation.
- April 15 – Assassination of Giuseppe (Joe the Boss) Masseria, New York City Mafia boss.
- April 17 – After the negotiations between the republican ministers of Spain and Catalonia, the Catalan Republic becomes the Generalitat of Catalonia, a Catalan autonomous government inside the Spanish Republic.
- April 22 – Austria, the UK, Denmark, Germany, Italy, Sweden and the United States recognize the Spanish Republic.
- April 25 – The automobile manufacturer Porsche is founded by Ferdinand Porsche in Stuttgart.

=== May ===
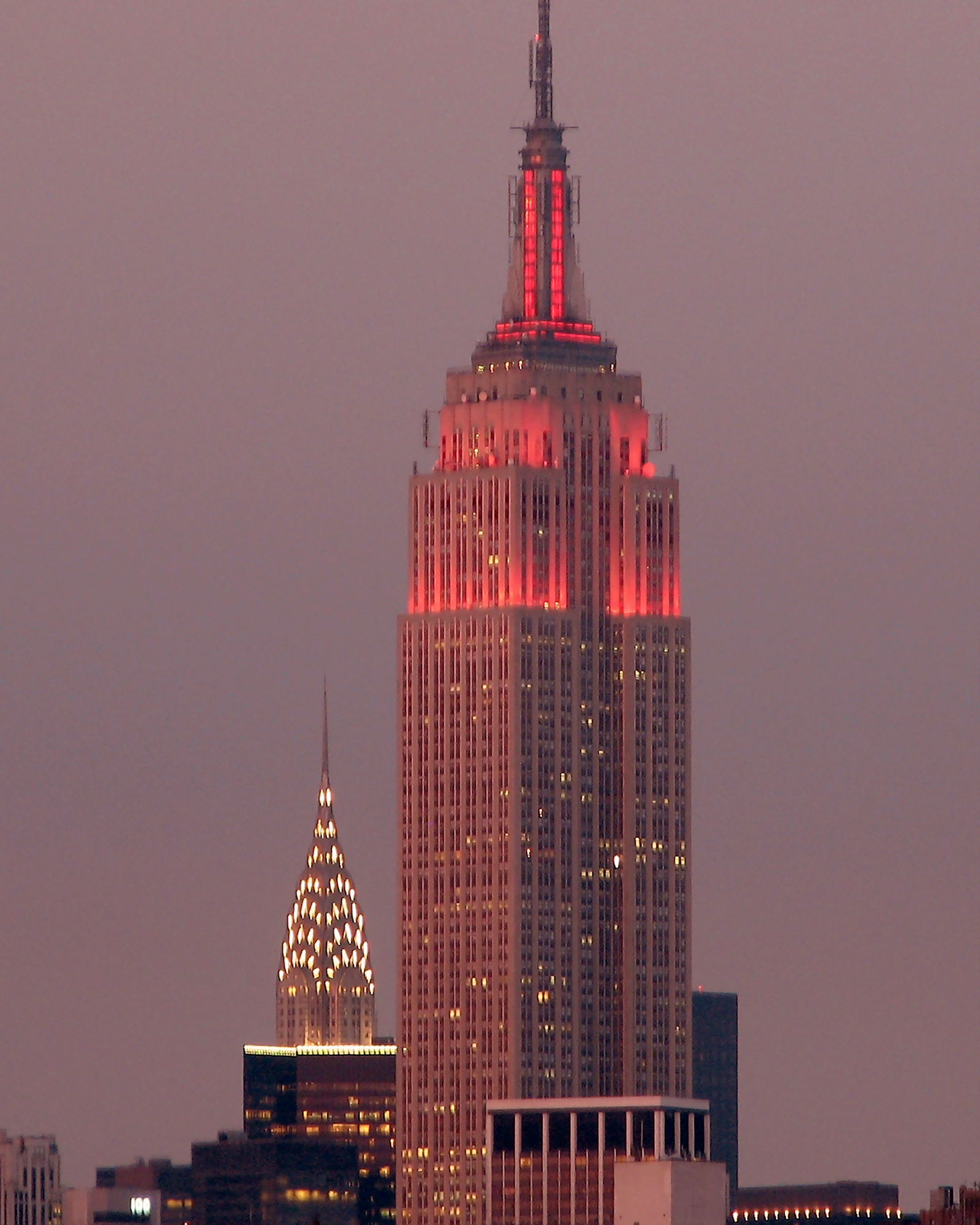
May 1: Empire State Building is completed.

- May 1 – Construction of the Empire State Building is completed in New York City.
- May 4 – Kemal Atatürk is re-elected president of Turkey.
- May 5 – İsmet İnönü forms a new government in Turkey (7th government).
- May 11 – The Creditanstalt, Austria's largest bank, goes bankrupt, beginning the banking collapse in Central Europe that causes a worldwide financial meltdown.
- May 13 – Paul Doumer is elected president of France.
- May 14 – Ådalen shootings: Five people are killed in Ådalen, Sweden, when soldiers open fire on an unarmed trade union demonstration.
- May 15
  - The Chinese Communists inflict a sharp defeat on the Kuomintang forces.
  - Pope Pius XI issues the encyclical Quadragesimo anno, on the "reconstruction of the social order".
- May 31 – The Second Encirclement Campaign against Jiangxi Soviet ends in the defeat of the Kuomintang.

=== June ===
- June–November – 1931 China flood: the Yangtze and Huai Rivers flood in a populous region, leaving an estimated 422,000 dead (150,000 drowned) with many more dying of consequential starvation and disease in the aftermath.
- June 5
  - German Chancellor Heinrich Brüning visits London, where he warns British Prime Minister Ramsay MacDonald that the collapse of the Austrian banking system, caused by the bankruptcy of the Creditanstalt, has left the entire German banking system on the verge of collapse.
  - Anti-Chinese rioting occurs in Pyongyang. Approximately 127 Chinese people are killed, 393 wounded, and a considerable number of properties are destroyed by Korean residents.
- June 14 – Saint-Philibert disaster: The overloaded pleasure craft Saint-Philibert, carrying trippers home to Nantes from the Île de Noirmoutier, sinks at the mouth of the River Loire in France; over 450 drown.
- June 19
  - In an attempt to stop the banking crisis in Central Europe from causing a worldwide financial meltdown, U.S. President Herbert Hoover issues the Hoover Moratorium.
  - The Geneva Convention (1929) relative to the treatment of prisoners of war enters into force.
- June 23–July 1 – Wiley Post and Harold Gatty accomplish the first round-the-world flight in a single-engine plane, flying eastabout from Roosevelt Field, New York, in 8 days, 15 hours, 51 minutes.

=== July ===
- July 1 – The rebuilt Milano Centrale railway station officially opens in Italy.
- July 9 – Irish racing driver Kaye Don breaks the world water speed record at Lake Garda, Italy.
- July 10 – Norway issues a royal proclamation claiming the uninhabited part of eastern Greenland as Erik the Red's Land.
- July 13 – Royal soldiers shoot and kill 22 people demonstrating against the Maharaja Hari Singh, of the Indian princely state of Kashmir and Jammu.
- July 16 – Emperor Haile Selassie signs the first Constitution of Ethiopia.
- July 20 – A violent tornado strikes the city of Lublin, Poland.

=== August ===
- August 2 – Murder of Paul Anlauf and Franz Lenck: Two Berlin police officers are killed by Communists.
- August 9 – A referendum in Prussia for dissolving the Landtag ends with the "yes" side winning 37% of the vote, which is insufficient for calling the early elections. The elections are intended to remove the Social Democratic Party (SPD) government of Otto Braun. Supporting the "yes" side were the NSDAP, the DNVP and the Communist Party (KPD), while supporting the "no" side were the SPD and Zentrum.
- August 24 – The Labour Government of Ramsay MacDonald resigns in Britain, replaced by a National Government of people drawn from all parties, also under MacDonald.

=== September ===
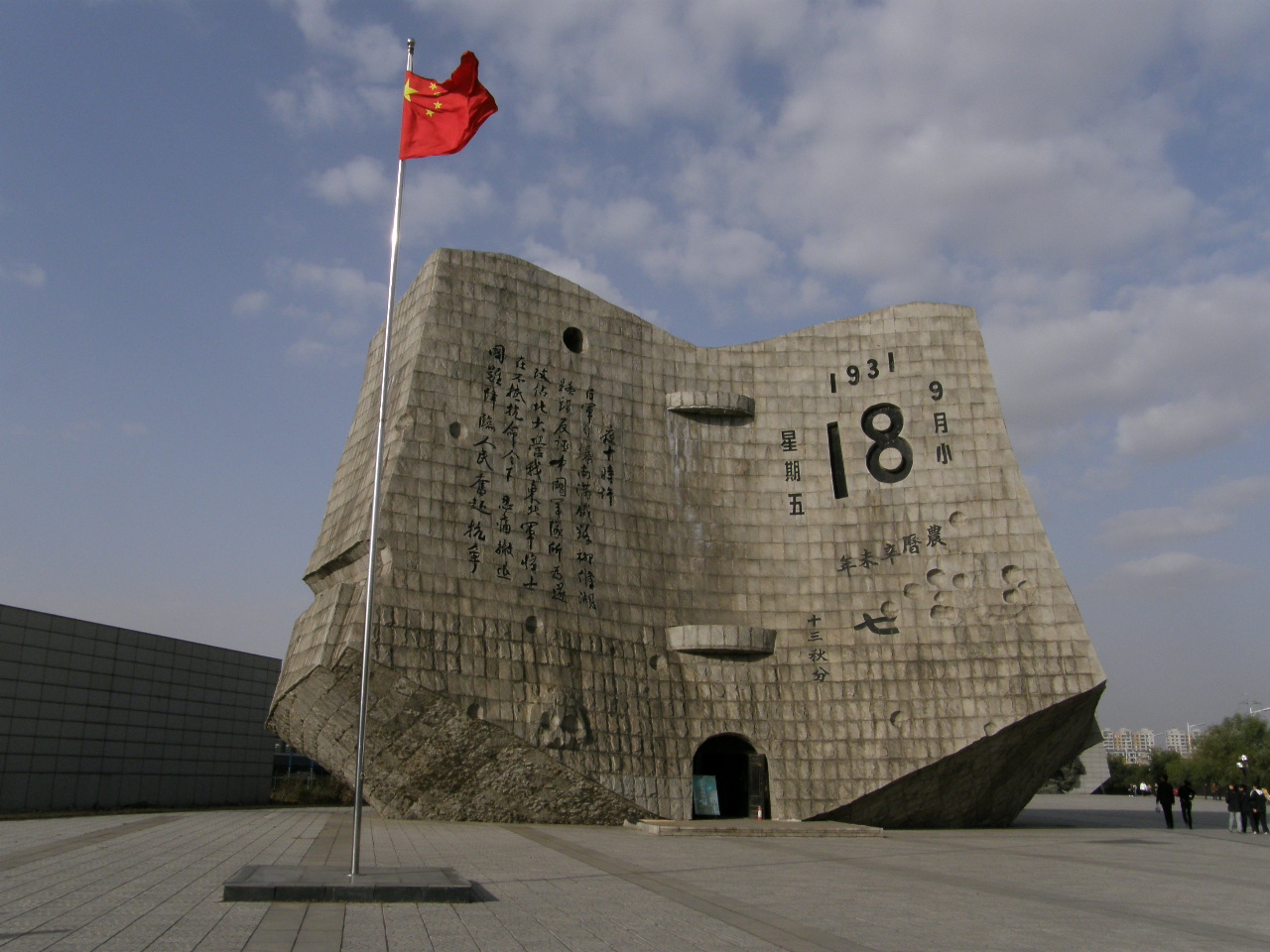
September 18: The Mukden Incident: Incident Museum in Shenyang

- September 7 – The Second Round Table Conference on the constitutional future of India opens in London; Mahatma Gandhi represents the Indian National Congress.
- September 10 – The worst hurricane in British Honduras history kills an estimated 1,500.
- September 18 – The Japanese military stages the Mukden Incident, an explosion blamed on Chinese dissidents and used as a pretext for the Japanese invasion of Manchuria.
- September 19 – The United Kingdom abandons the gold standard.
- September 20 – Held at gunpoint, the Chinese commander of Kirin province announces the annexation of that territory to Japan.

=== October ===
- October 5 – American aviators Clyde Edward Pangborn and Hugh Herndon Jr., complete the first non-stop flight across the Pacific Ocean, flying their plane, Miss Veedol, from Misawa, Japan, to East Wenatchee, Washington, in 41½ hours.
- October 11 – A rally in Bad Harzburg, Germany leads to the Harzburg Front being founded, uniting the NSDAP, the DNVP, the Stahlhelm and various other right-wing factions.
- October 24 – The George Washington Bridge across the Hudson River in the United States is dedicated; it opens to traffic the following day. At 3,500 feet (1,100 m), it nearly doubles the previous record for the longest main span in the world.
- October 27 – The United Kingdom general election results in the victory of the National Government, and the defeat of Labour Party, in the country's greatest ever electoral landslide.

=== November ===
- November 7
  - The Chinese Soviet Republic is proclaimed by Mao Zedong.
  - Red China News Agency (a predecessor of the Xinhua News Agency) is officially founded, and news wire service start in Ruijin, Jiangxi Province, China.
- November 8
  - French police launch a large-scale raid against Corsican bandits.
  - The Panama Canal is closed for a couple of weeks, due to damage caused by earthquakes.
- November 26 – Heavy hydrogen, later named deuterium, is discovered by American chemist Harold Urey.

=== December ===
- December 5 – The original Cathedral of Christ the Saviour in Moscow (1883) is demolished, by order of Joseph Stalin.
- December 8 – Carl Friedrich Goerdeler is appointed Reich Price Commissioner, in Germany to enforce the deflationary policies of the Brüning government.
- December 9 – The Spanish Constituent Cortes approves the Spanish Constitution of 1931, effectively establishing the Second Spanish Republic.
- December 10 – Niceto Alcalá-Zamora is elected president of the Spanish Republic.
- December 11 – The Parliament of the United Kingdom enacts the Statute of Westminster, which establishes a status of legislative equality between the self-governing dominions of the Commonwealth of Australia, Canada, the Irish Free State, Newfoundland, the Dominion of New Zealand and the Union of South Africa.
- December 13 – Wakatsuki Reijirō resigns as Prime Minister of Japan.
- December 19 – The UAP/Country Coalition, led by Joseph Lyons, defeats the Australian Labor Government, led by Prime Minister James Scullin. Coming in the aftermath of two splits in the Labor Party, the election comes about due to the defeat of the Scullin government on the floor of the House of Representatives – to date, it is the last federal election where a one-term government was defeated. Lyons will be sworn in January 6th the following year, but not before disbanding the Coalition, after the UAP wins enough seats to form a government in its own right.

== Births ==
=== January ===
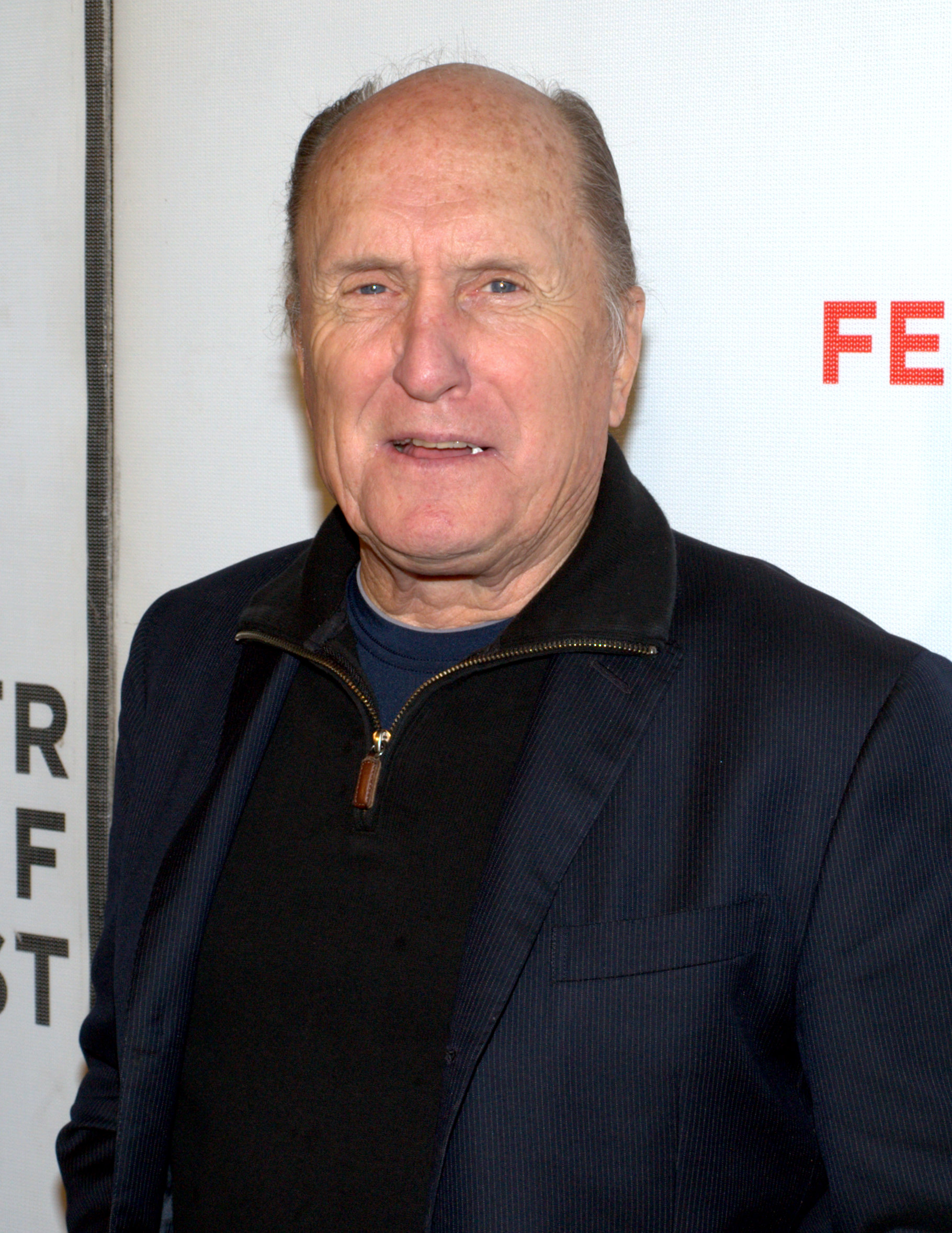
Robert Duvall

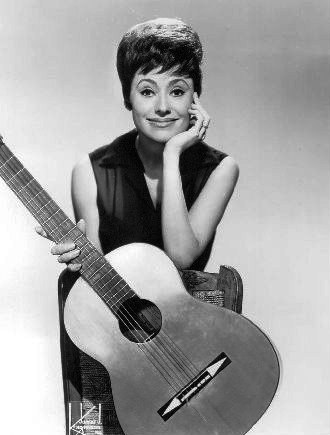
Caterina Valente

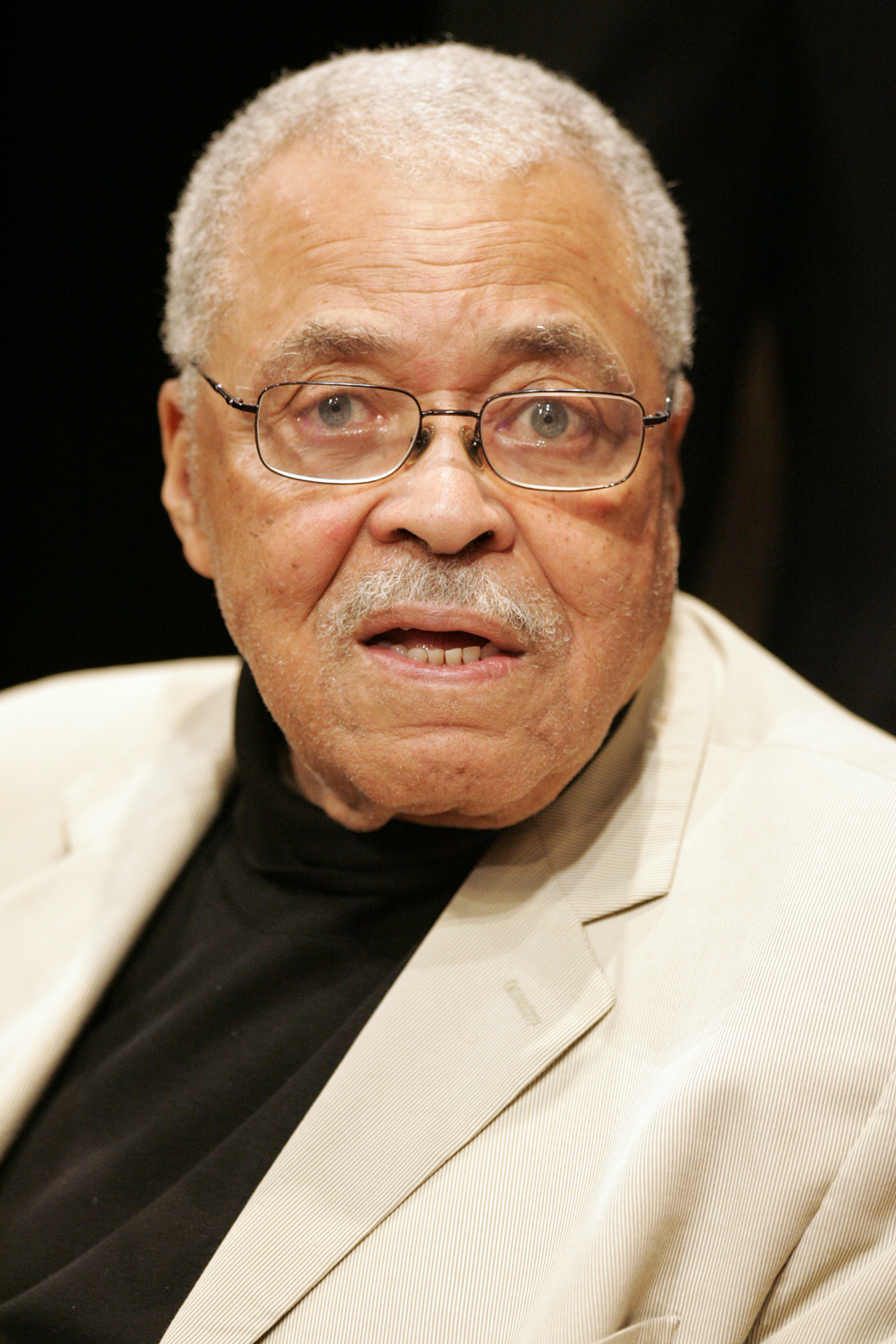
James Earl Jones

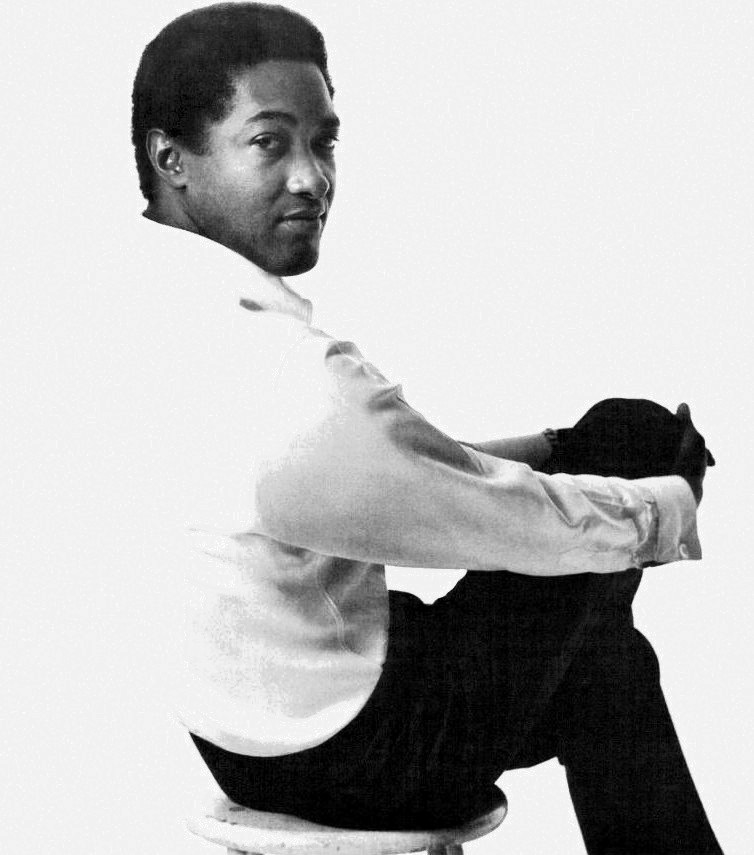
Sam Cooke

- January 1
  - Mona Hammond, Jamaican-born British actress (d. 2022)
  - Mohammad Ali Samatar, 5th Prime Minister of Somalia (d. 2016)
- January 2 – Toshiki Kaifu, Prime Minister of Japan (d. 2022)
- January 4
  - Guido Messina, Italian road and track cyclist (d. 2020)
  - William Deane, 22nd Governor-General of Australia
  - Cleopa Msuya, 3rd Prime Minister of Tanzania (d. 2025)
- January 5
  - Alvin Ailey, American choreographer (d. 1989)
  - Alfred Brendel, Austrian pianist (d. 2025)
  - Robert Duvall, American actor and director (d. 2026)
  - Dave Peterson, American ice hockey coach (d. 1997)
- January 6 – E. L. Doctorow, American author (d. 2015)
- January 7 – Edwin Torres, American Judge and novelist
- January 8 – Bill Graham, German concert promoter (d. 1991)
- January 10 – Nik Abdul Aziz Nik Mat, Malaysian politician, Muslim cleric (d. 2015)
- January 12 – Roland Alphonso, Jamaican musician (d. 1998)
- January 14 – Caterina Valente, French singer and actress (d. 2024)
- January 16
  - Shuhrat Abbosov, Uzbek actor, film director, screenwriter, and film producer (d. 2018)
  - Johannes Rau, President of Germany (d. 2006)
- January 17 – James Earl Jones, African-American actor (d. 2024)
- January 20 – David Lee, American physicist, recipient of the Nobel Prize in Physics
- January 22 – Sam Cooke, African-American singer (d. 1964)
- January 24 – Lars Hörmander, Swedish mathematician (d. 2012)
- January 25 – Dean Jones, American actor (d. 2015)
- January 27 – Mordecai Richler, Canadian author (d. 2001)
- January 28 – Lucia Bosè, Italian actress (d. 2020)
- January 29 – Ferenc Mádl, President of Hungary (d. 2011)

=== February ===
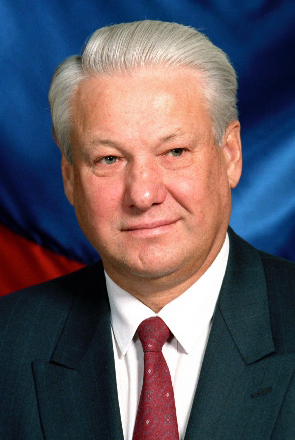
Boris Yeltsin

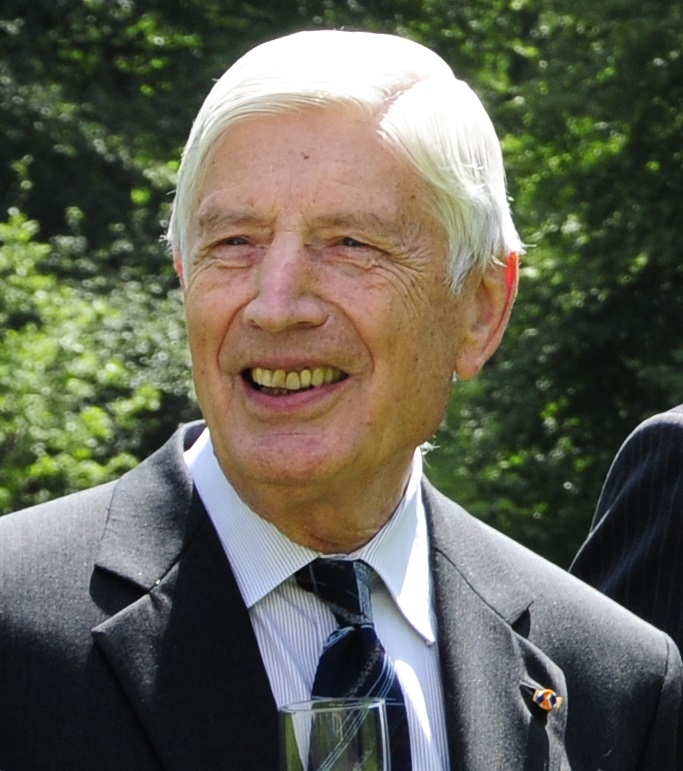
Dries van Agt

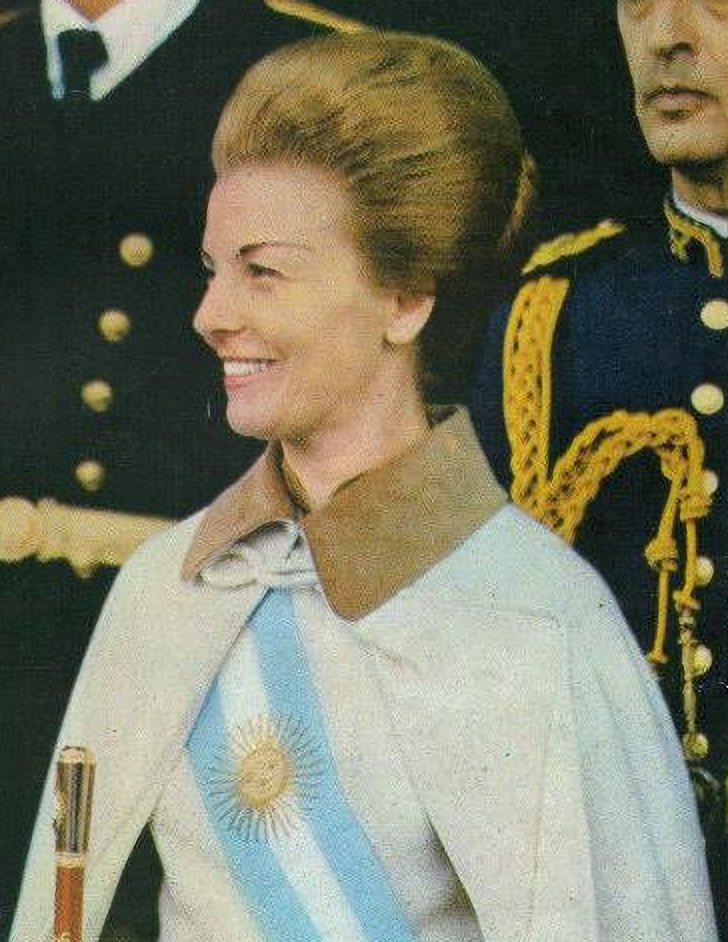
Isabel Perón

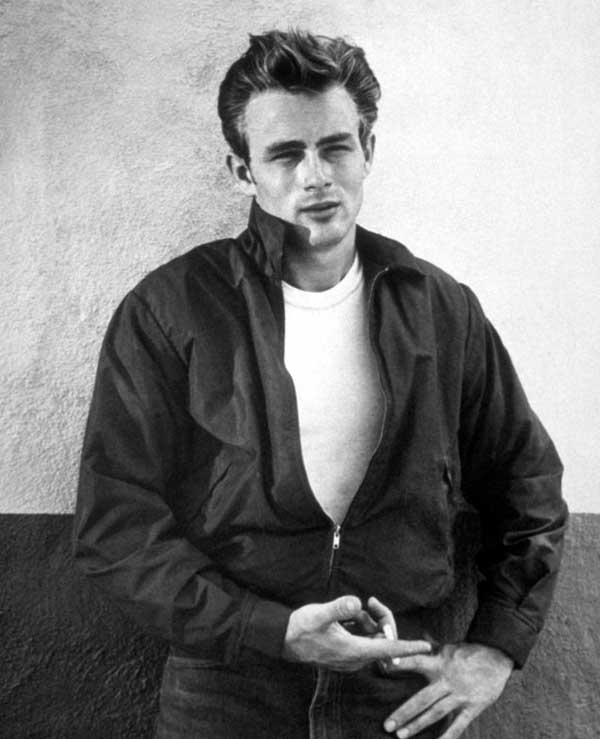
James Dean

- February 1
  - Boris Yeltsin, 1st President of Russia (d. 2007)
  - Oswald Oberhuber, Austrian painter, sculptor, and graphic artist (d. 2020)
- February 2
  - Dries van Agt, Dutch politician, 46th Prime Minister of the Netherlands (d. 2024)
  - Walter Burkert, German writer (d. 2015)
- February 4 – Isabel Perón, 41st President of Argentina
- February 6
  - Rip Torn, American actor and comedian (d. 2019)
  - Mamie Van Doren, American actress and writer
  - Ricardo Vidal, Filipino Roman Catholic prelate, cardinal (d. 2017)
- February 8
  - James Dean, American actor (d. 1955)
  - Shadia, Egyptian actress, singer (d. 2017)
- February 9
  - Thomas Bernhard, Austrian author (d. 1989)
  - Josef Masopust, Czech football player and coach (d. 2015)
- February 12 – Agustín García-Gasco Vicente, Spanish cardinal (d. 2011)
- February 14 – Gerrit Jan Heijn, Dutch businessman (d. 1987)
- February 15 – Claire Bloom, English actress
- February 18 – Toni Morrison, African-American writer, recipient of the Nobel Prize in Literature (d. 2019)
- February 19 – Camillo Ruini, Italian cardinal (d. 2026)
- February 20 – John Milnor, American mathematician
- February 23 – Linda Cristal, Argentine actress (d. 2020)
- February 26 – Josephine Tewson, British actress (d. 2022)

=== March ===
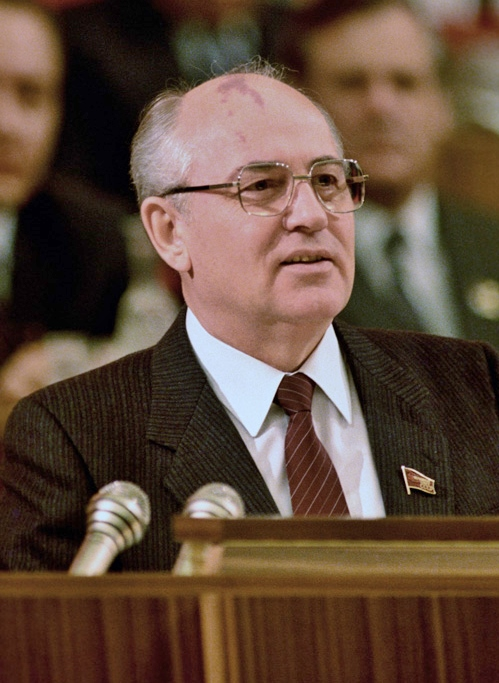
Mikhail Gorbachev

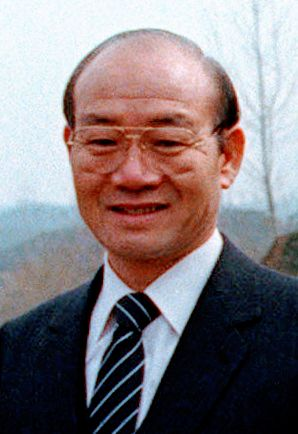
Chun Doo-hwan

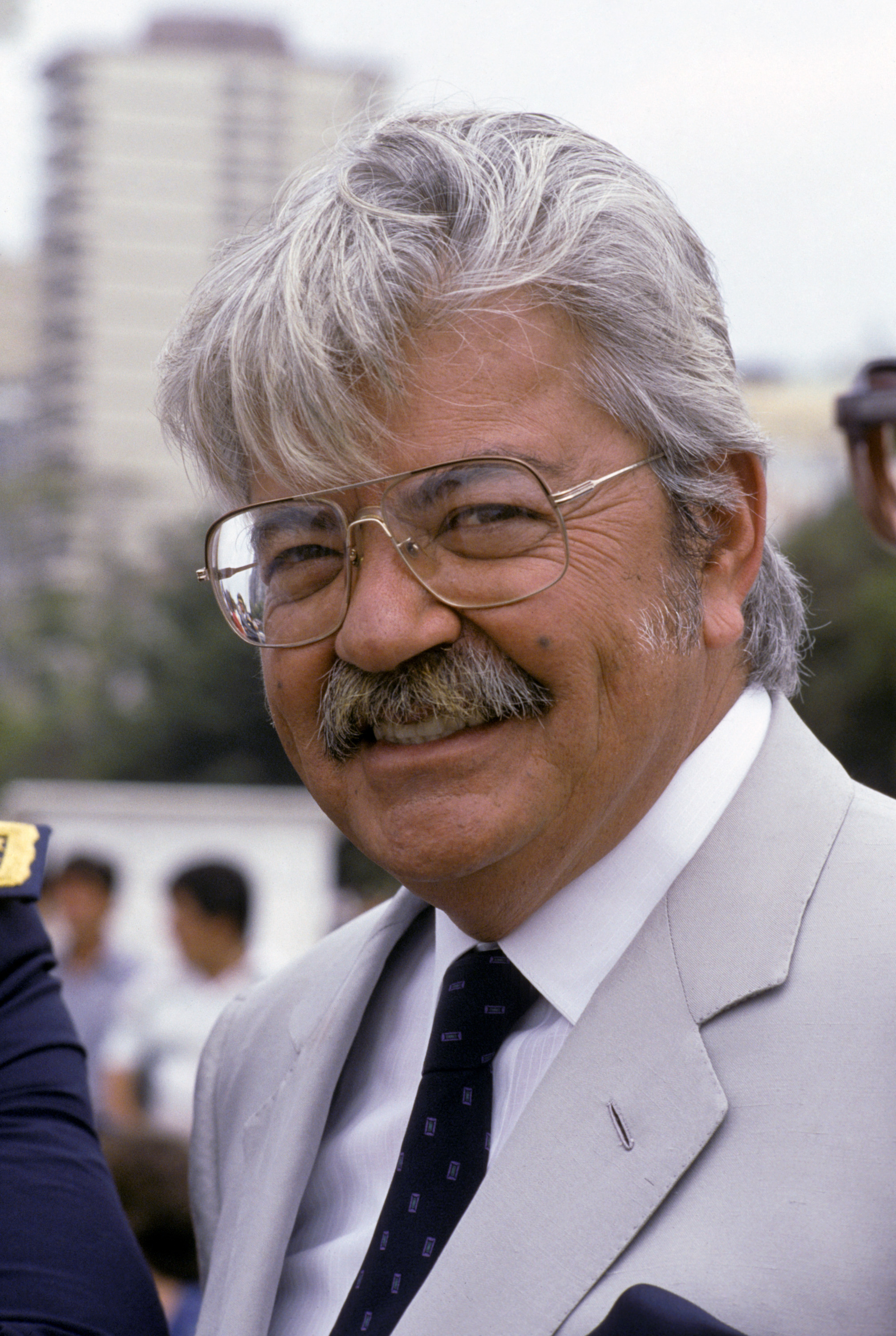
León Febres Cordero

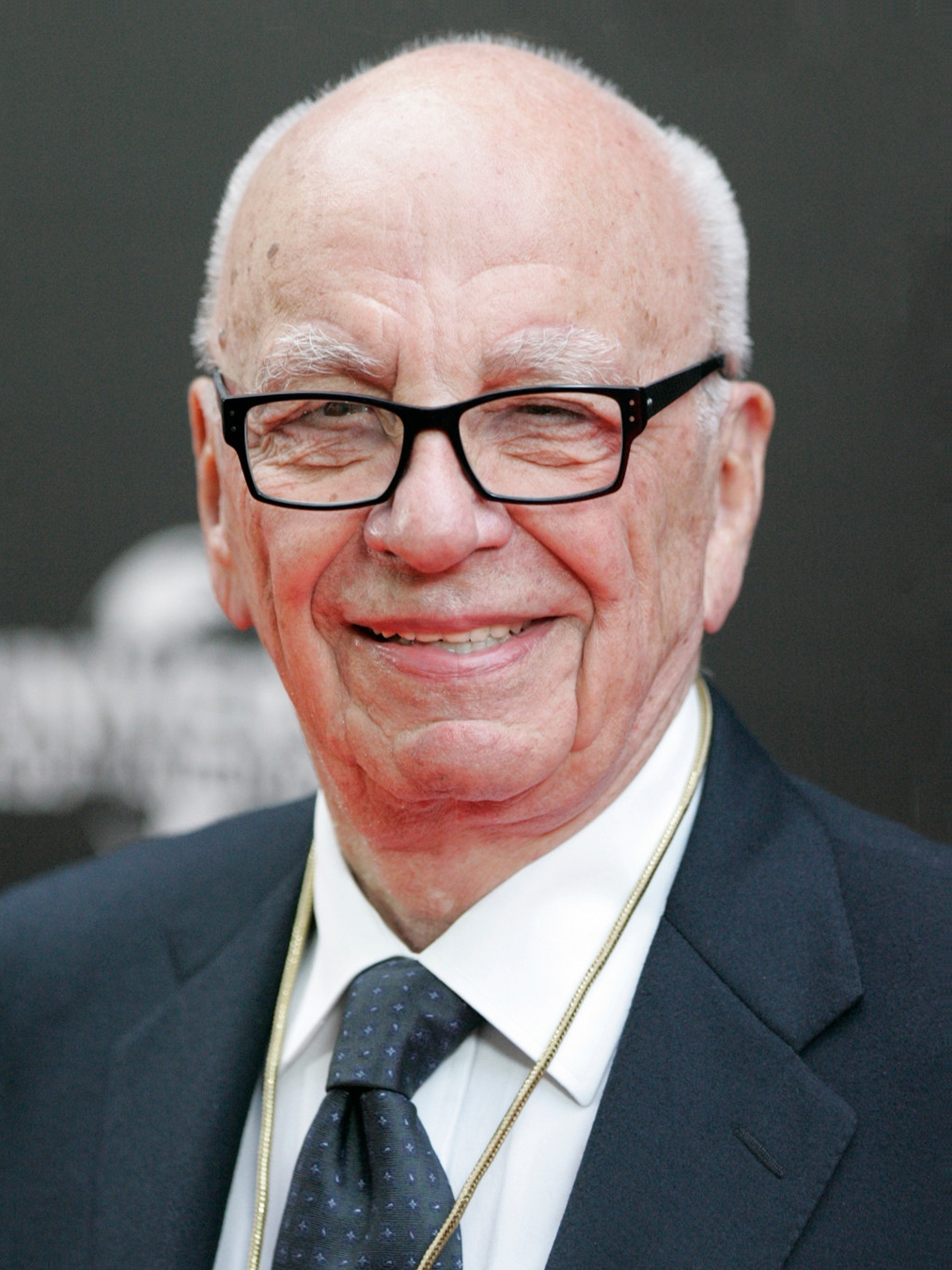
Rupert Murdoch

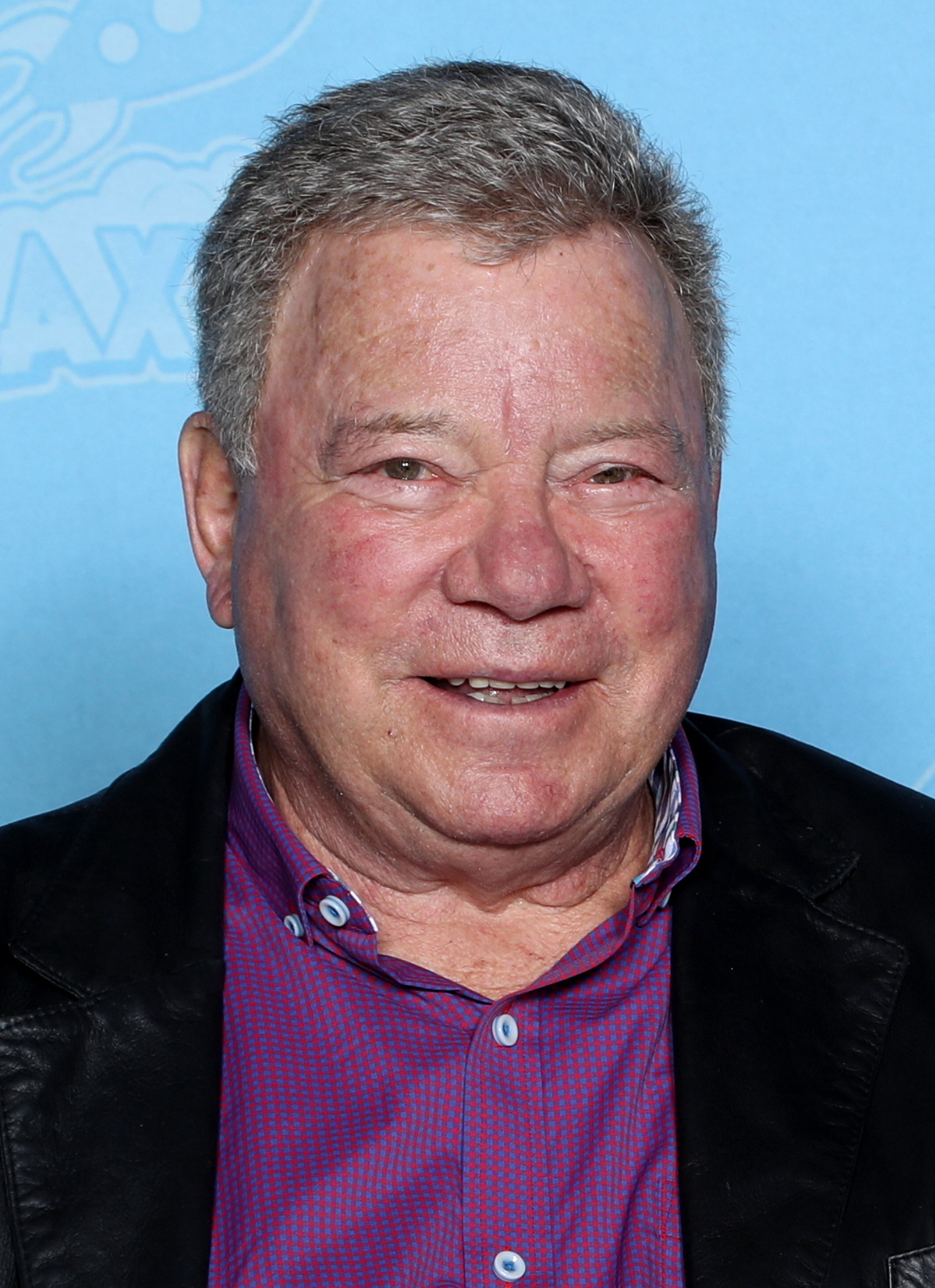
William Shatner

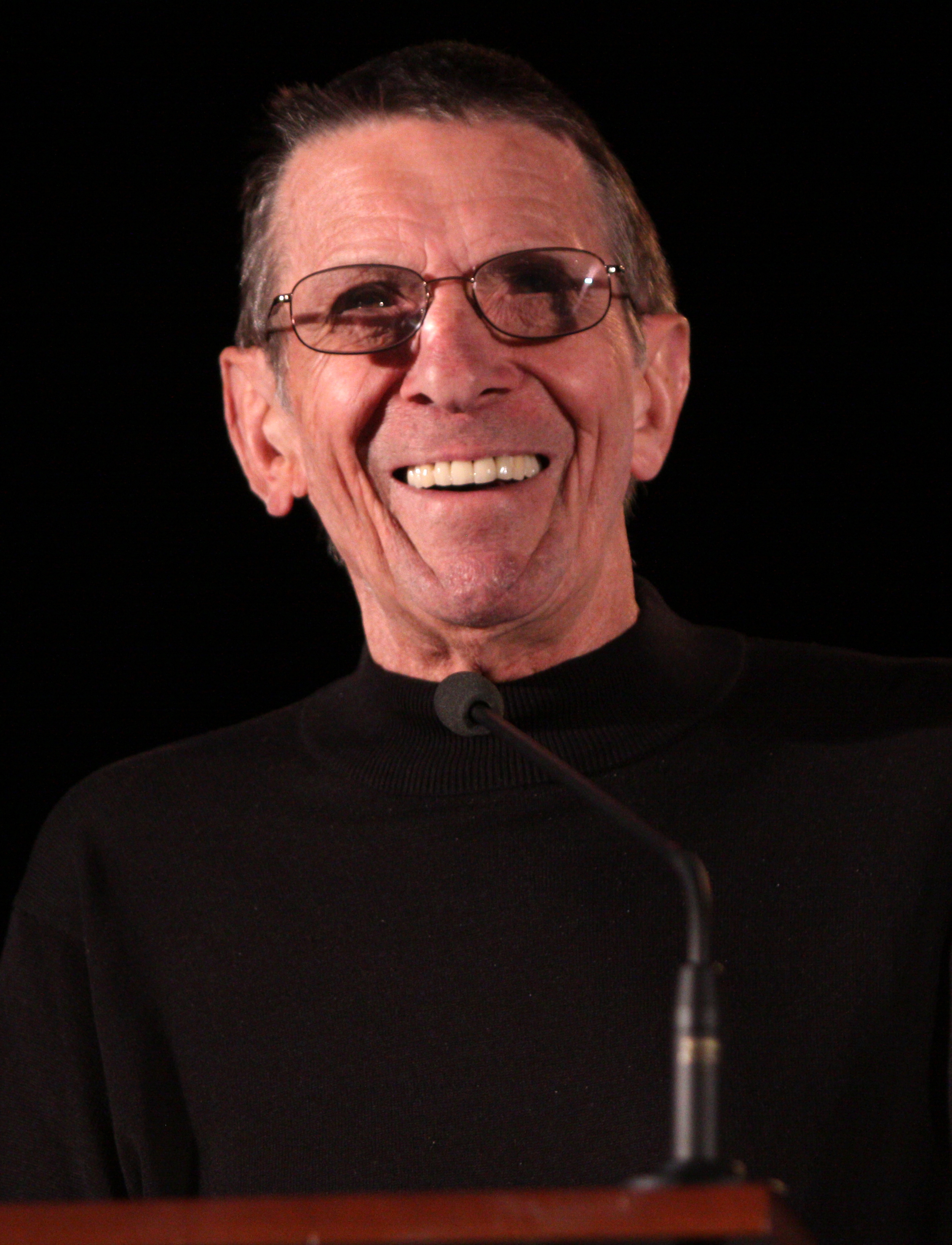
Leonard Nimoy

- March 1 – Lamberto Dini, Italian politician, economist and 51st Prime Minister of Italy
- March 2 – Mikhail Gorbachev, the 8th and final leader of the Soviet Union, recipient of the Nobel Peace Prize (d. 2022)
- March 4
  - William H. Keeler, American Roman Catholic prelate (d. 2017)
  - Alice Rivlin, American economist (d. 2019)
- March 5 – Barry Tuckwell, Australian horn player (d. 2020)
- March 6 – Chun Doo-hwan, 5th President of South Korea (d. 2021)
- March 8
  - Neil Postman, American media theorist and cultural critic (d. 2003)
  - John McPhee, American author
- March 9 – León Febres Cordero, President of Ecuador (d. 2008)
- March 10 – Kovambo Nujoma, First Lady of Namibia
- March 11
  - Janosch, German children's author and illustrator (d. 2026)
  - Rupert Murdoch, Australian-born publisher
- March 14 – Lisbet Palme, Swedish child psychologist (d. 2018)
- March 15 – D. J. Fontana, American drummer (d. 2018)
- March 16 – Elliott Belgrave, 7th Governor-General of Barbados
- March 18 – Vlastimil Bubník, Czech ice hockey and football player (d. 2015)
- March 22
  - Burton Richter, American physicist and recipient of the Nobel Prize in Physics (d. 2018)
  - William Shatner, Canadian actor and science fiction novelist (Star Trek)
- March 26 – Leonard Nimoy, American actor, film director (Star Trek), and singer (d. 2015)
- March 27 – David Janssen, American actor (The Fugitive) (d. 1980)
- March 28 – Anatoly Lein, Russian-born American chess Grandmaster (d. 2018)
- March 29 – Aleksei Gubarev, Russian cosmonaut (d. 2015)

=== April ===
- April 1
  - Ita Ever, Estonian actress (d. 2023)
  - Rolf Hochhuth, German dramatist (d. 2020)
  - Jean-Jacques Honorat, 3rd Prime Minister of Haiti (d. 2023)
- April 2 – Joseph Joffo, French author (d. 2018)
- April 4 – Catherine Tizard, 16th Governor-General of New Zealand (d. 2021)
- April 5 – Héctor Olivera, Argentine film director, producer and screenwriter
- April 6
  - Suchitra Sen, Bengali actress (d. 2014)
  - Radomil Eliška, Czech conductor (d. 2019)
- April 7 – Daniel Ellsberg, American whistleblower (d. 2023)
- April 8 – John Gavin, American actor and diplomat (d. 2018)
- April 11
  - Luis Cabral, 1st President of Guinea-Bissau (d. 2009)
  - Mustafa Dağıstanlı, Turkish free-style wrestler (d. 2022)
  - Nelly Kaplan, Argentine-born French movie director and screenwriter (d. 2020)
- April 13 – Dan Gurney, American race car driver (d. 2018)
- April 15
  - Helen Maksagak, Canadian, first Inuk and woman to be Commissioner of both the Northwest Territories and Nunavut (d. 2009)
  - Tomas Tranströmer, Swedish poet, translator and recipient of the Nobel Prize in Literature (d. 2015)
- April 17 – Bill Ramsey, American jazz and pop singer, journalist and actor (died 2021)
- April 18 – Klas Lestander, Swedish biathlete and Olympic champion (d. 2023)
- April 19 – Kobie Coetsee, South African politician (d. 2000)
- April 26 – John Cain, Australian politician (d. 2019)
- April 27 – Igor Oistrakh, Soviet and Russian violinist (d. 2021)
- April 29
  - Frank Auerbach, German-born painter (d. 2024)
  - Lonnie Donegan, Scottish musician (d. 2002)

=== May ===
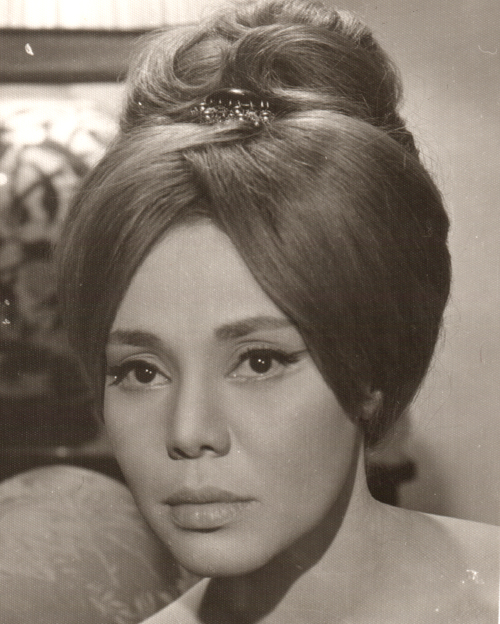
Magda

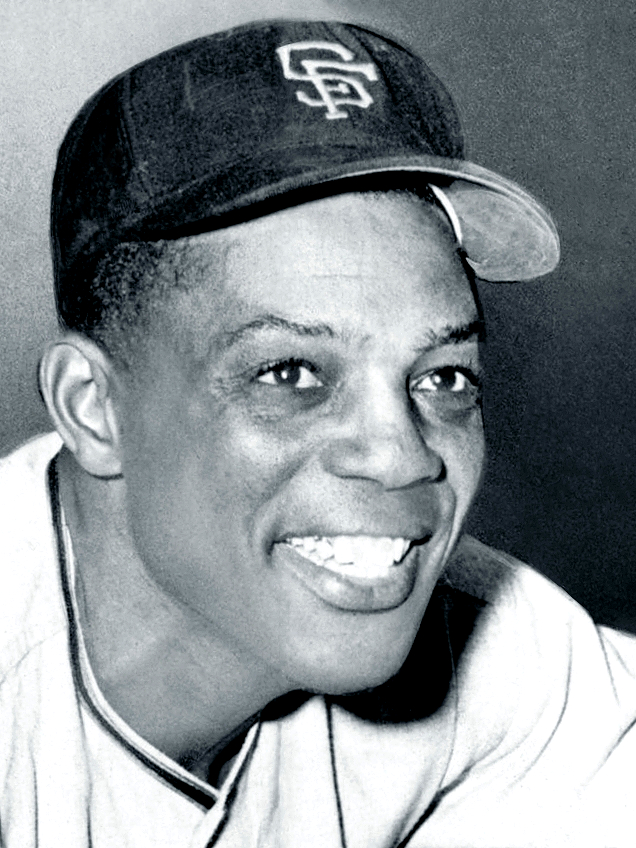
Willie Mays

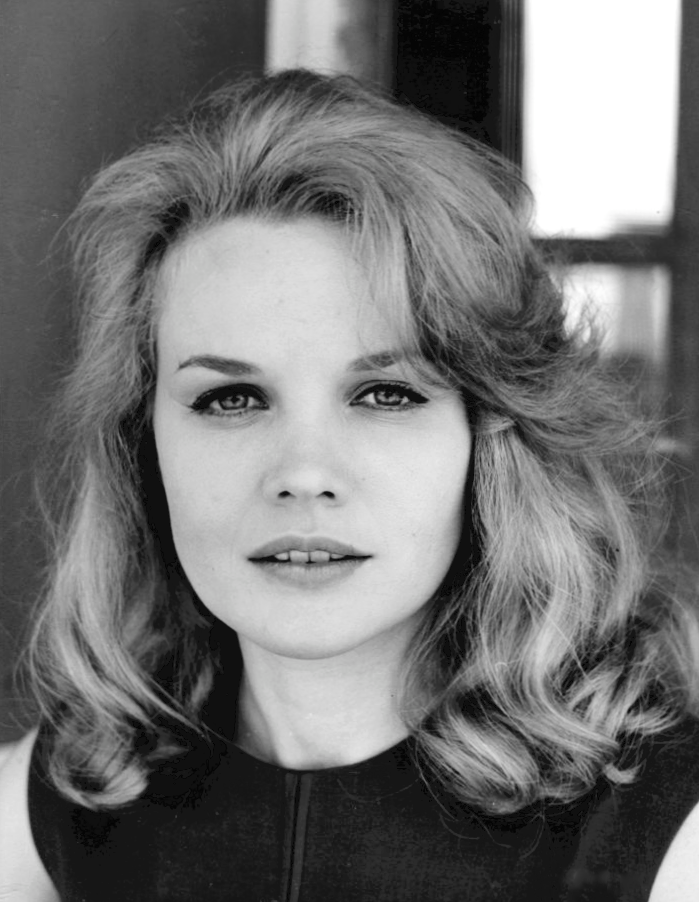
Carroll Baker

- May 1 – Chaudhry Ghulam Rasool, Pakistani educationist (d. 1991)
- May 3
  - Aldo Rossi, Italian architect and designer (d. 1997)
  - Hirokazu Kanazawa, Japanese karate practitioner and teacher (d. 2019)
- May 6
  - Magda, Egyptian actress (d. 2020)
  - Willie Mays, African-American baseball player (d. 2024)
- May 7
  - Teresa Brewer, American pop, jazz singer (d. 2007)
  - Marta Terry González, Cuban librarian (d. 2018)
  - Gene Wolfe, American science fiction and fantasy writer (d. 2019)
- May 10 – M. Chidananda Murthy, Indian historian (d. 2020)
- May 13
  - András Hajnal, Hungarian mathematician (d. 2016)
  - Jim Jones, American People's Temple cult leader (d. 1978)
  - Jiří Petr, Czech university president (d. 2014)
- May 15 – James Fitz-Allen Mitchell, 2nd Prime Minister of Saint Vincent and the Grenadines (d. 2021)
- May 16 – Magda Guzmán, Mexican actress (d. 2015)
- May 18 – Victoria Quirino-Gonzalez, First Lady of the Philippines (d. 2006)
- May 20 – George Vassiliou, 3rd President of Cyprus (d. 2026)
- May 21 – Bombolo, Italian character actor and comedian (d. 1987)
- May 22 – Francis Méano, French footballer (d. 1953)
- May 25 – Georgy Grechko, Russian cosmonaut (d. 2017)
- May 27 – Faten Hamama, Egyptian actress (d. 2015)
- May 28 – Carroll Baker, American actress
- May 31
  - John Schrieffer, American physicist and Nobel Prize laureate (d. 2019)
  - Shirley Verrett, American mezzo-soprano (d. 2010)

=== June ===
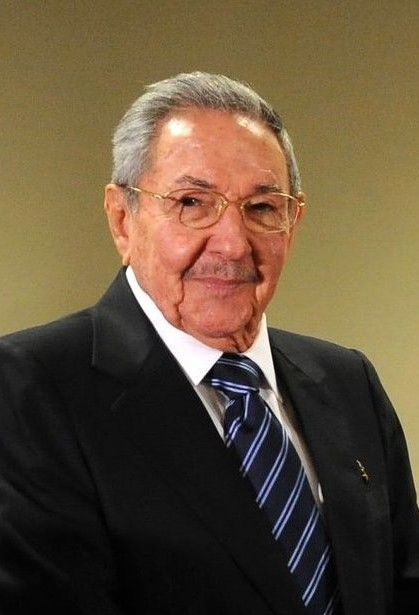
Raúl Castro

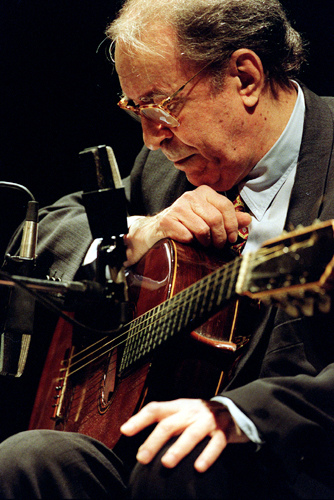
João Gilberto

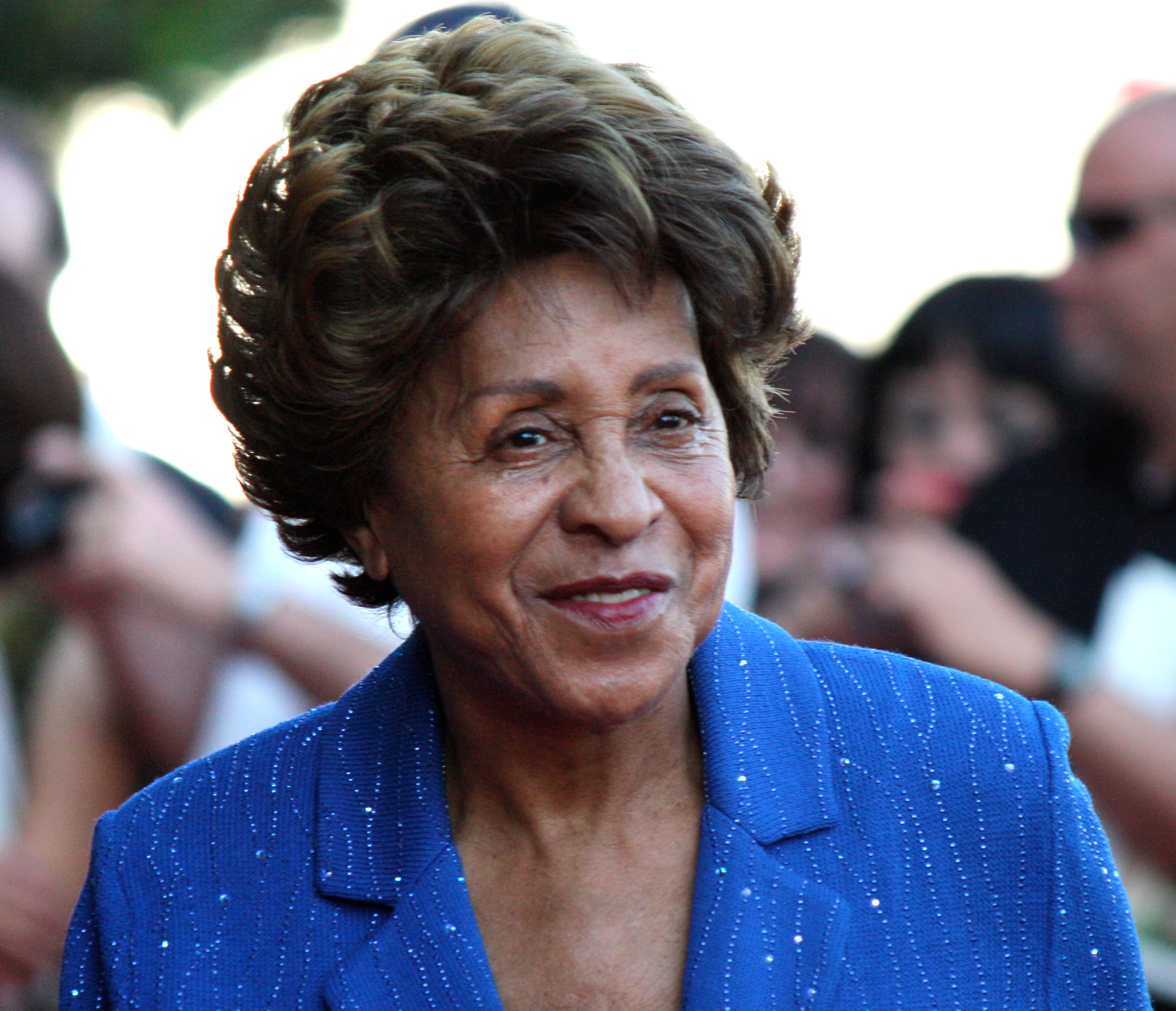
Marla Gibbs

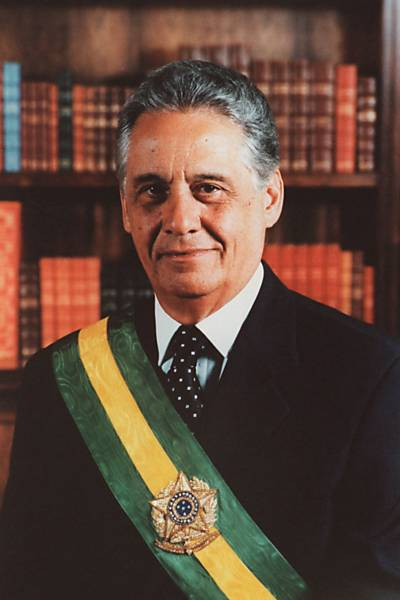
Fernando Henrique Cardoso

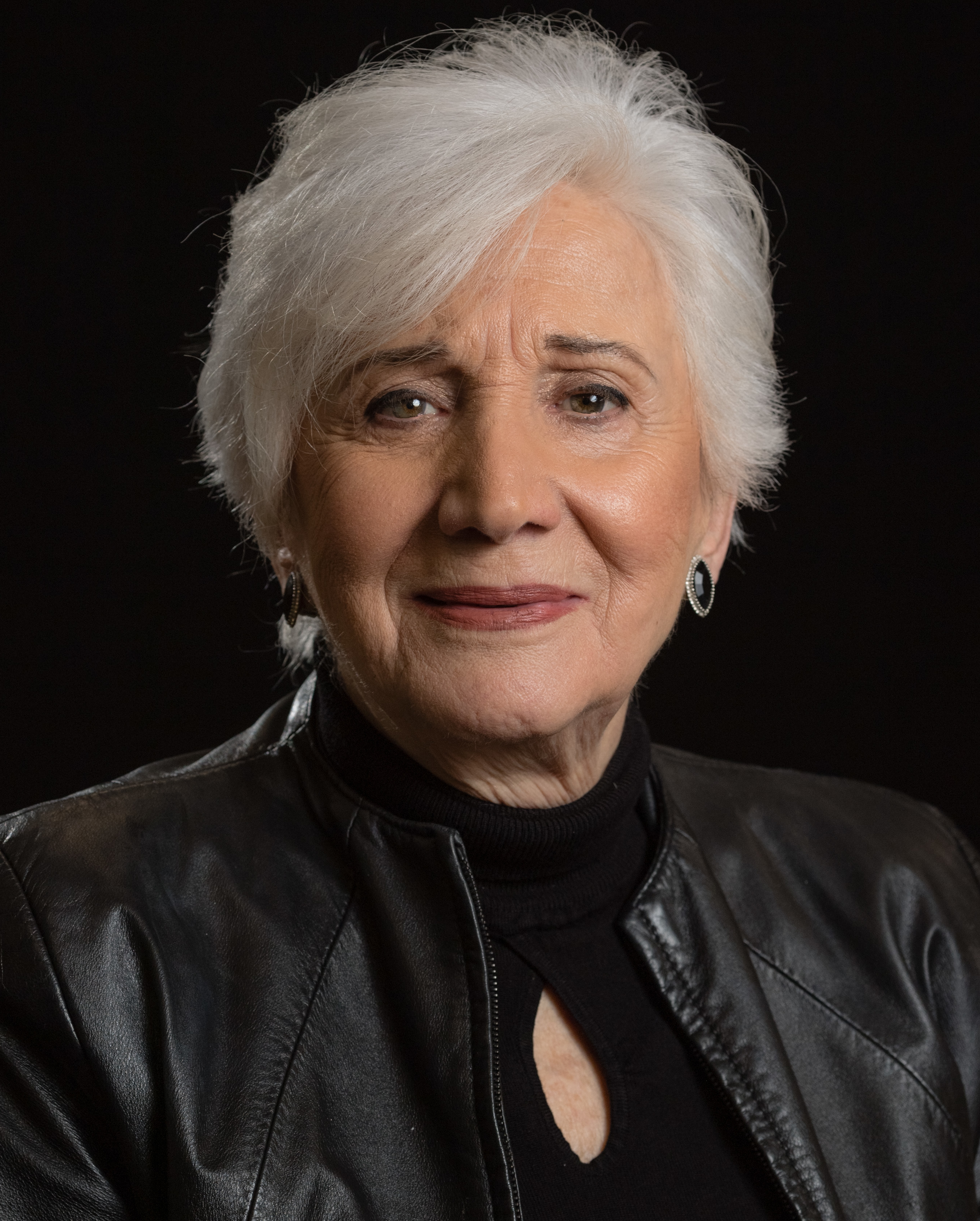
Olympia Dukakis

- June 1 – Lydie Koch-Miramond , French astrophysicist (d. 2023)
- June 2 – Viktor Tsaryov, Russian footballer (d. 2017)
- June 3
  - Raúl Castro, First Secretary of the Communist Party of Cuba
  - Lindy Remigino, American Olympic athlete (d. 2018)
- June 4 – D. M. Jayaratne, Sri Lankan politician (d. 2019)
- June 6 – Richard "Dick" Hickock, American convicted murderer (d. 1965)
- June 8 – Dana Wynter, German-born American actress (d. 2011)
- June 10 – João Gilberto, Brazilian singer-songwriter and guitarist, pioneer of bossa nova (d. 2019)
- June 14
  - Marla Gibbs, African-American actress, comedian and singer
  - Junior Walker, American saxophonist, singer (d. 1995)
- June 16 – Ivo Petrić, Slovenian composer (d. 2018)
- June 17 – John Baldessari, American conceptual artist (d. 2020)
- June 18 – Fernando Henrique Cardoso, 34th President of Brazil
- June 20
  - Olympia Dukakis, American actress (d. 2021)
  - Arne Nordheim, Norwegian composer (d. 2010)
- June 22 – Ian Browne, Australian track cyclist (d. 2023)
- June 23 – Ola Ullsten, Swedish politician and diplomat (d. 2018)
- June 24
  - Billy Casper, American golfer (d. 2015)
  - Gaston Flosse, French Polynesian politician
- June 25 – V. P. Singh, Prime Minister of India (d. 2008)
- June 26 – Colin Wilson, British novelist and philosopher (d. 2013)
- June 27
  - Graziella Galvani, Italian stage, television and film actress (d. 2022)
  - Martinus J. G. Veltman, Dutch physicist and recipient of the Nobel Prize in Physics (d. 2021)
- June 28
  - Hans Alfredson, Swedish actor, film director, writer and comedian (d. 2017)
  - Jenny Glusker, British biochemist and crystallographer
- June 29 – Alina Obidniak, Polish actress and theatre director (d. 2021)
- June 30 – Gerda Herrmann, German composer and poet (d. 2021)

=== July ===
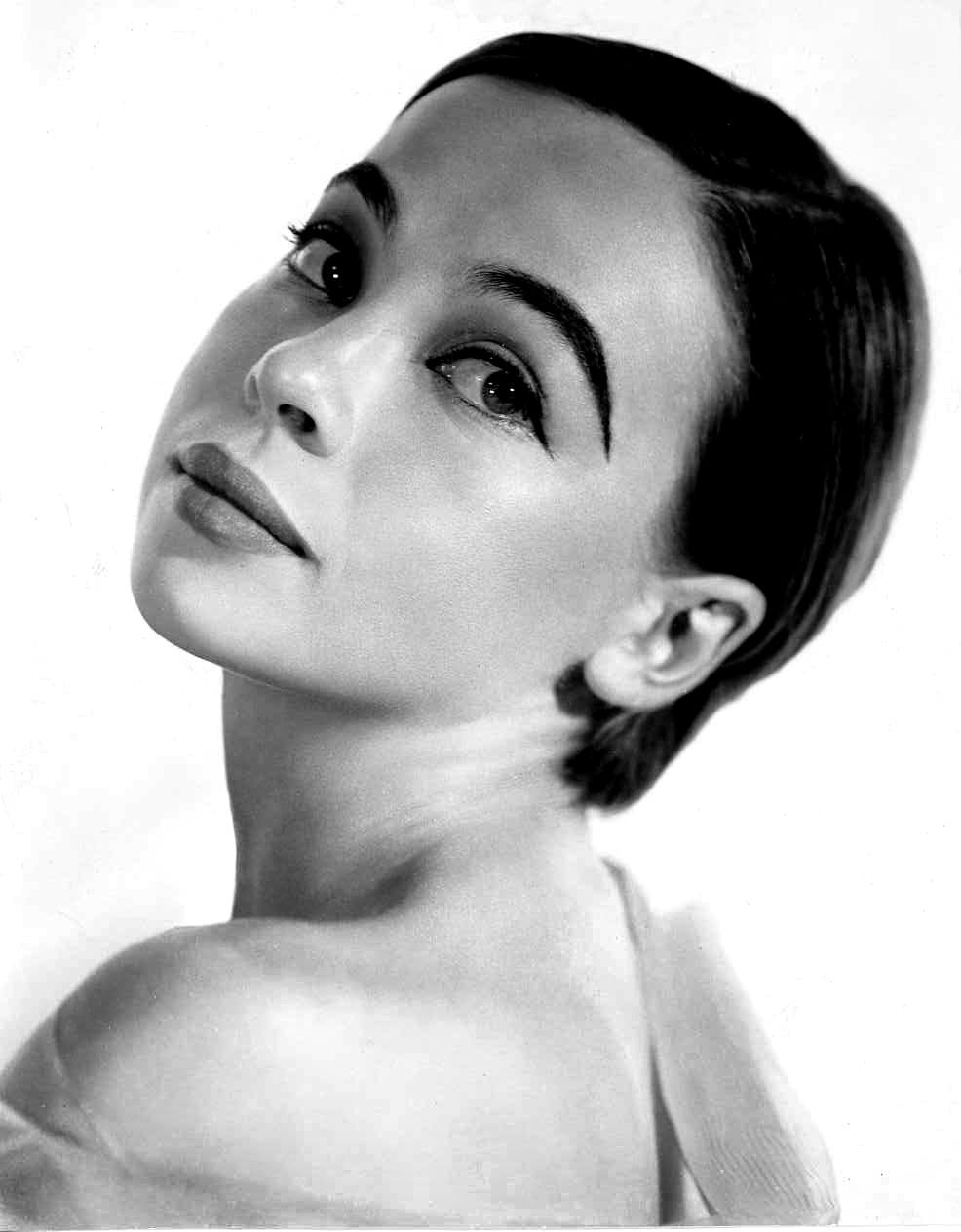
Leslie Caron

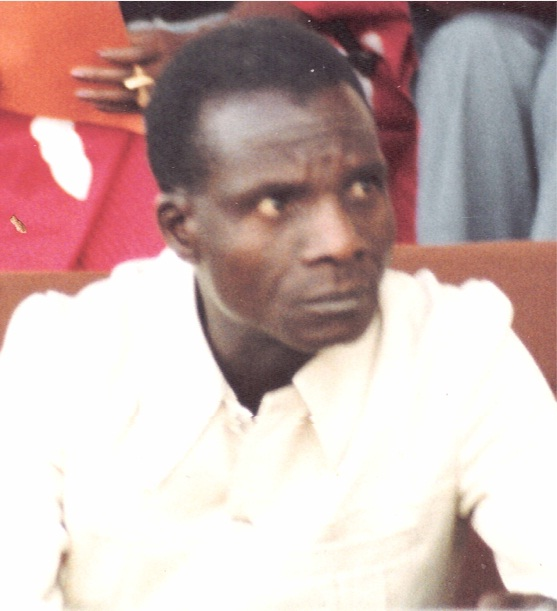
Seyni Kountché

- July 1
  - Leslie Caron, French actress
  - Stanislav Grof, Czech psychiatrist
  - Seyni Kountché, former President of Niger (d. 1987)
- July 4 – Stephen Boyd, Irish actor (Ben-Hur) (d. 1977)
- July 5 – Ismail Mahomed, South African, Namibian Chief Justice (d. 2000)
- July 6
  - Antonella Lualdi, Italian actress and singer (d. 2023)
  - Della Reese, African-American actress, singer and evangelist (d. 2017)
- July 10
  - Morris Chang, Chairman of Taiwan Semiconductor Manufacturing Company Ltd. (TSMC) in 1987
  - Jerry Herman, American composer, lyricist (d. 2019)
  - Alice Munro, Canadian writer, recipient of the Nobel Prize in Literature (d. 2024)
- July 14 – Robert Stephens, English actor (d. 1995)
- July 15
  - Clive Cussler, American thriller writer and underwater explorer (d. 2020)
  - Gene Louw, South African politician (d. 2015)
- July 22 – Guido de Marco, Maltese politician, 6th President of Malta (d. 2010)
- July 23
  - Te Arikinui Dame Te Atairangikaahu, Māori queen (d. 2006)
  - Arata Isozaki, Japanese architecter (d. 2022)
  - David M. Walsh, American cinematographer
- July 25 – Paul Danblon, Belgian composer, opera director, administrator and journalist (d. 2018)
- July 28 – Darryl Hickman, American actor, screenwriter, television executive, and acting coach (d. 2024)

=== August ===
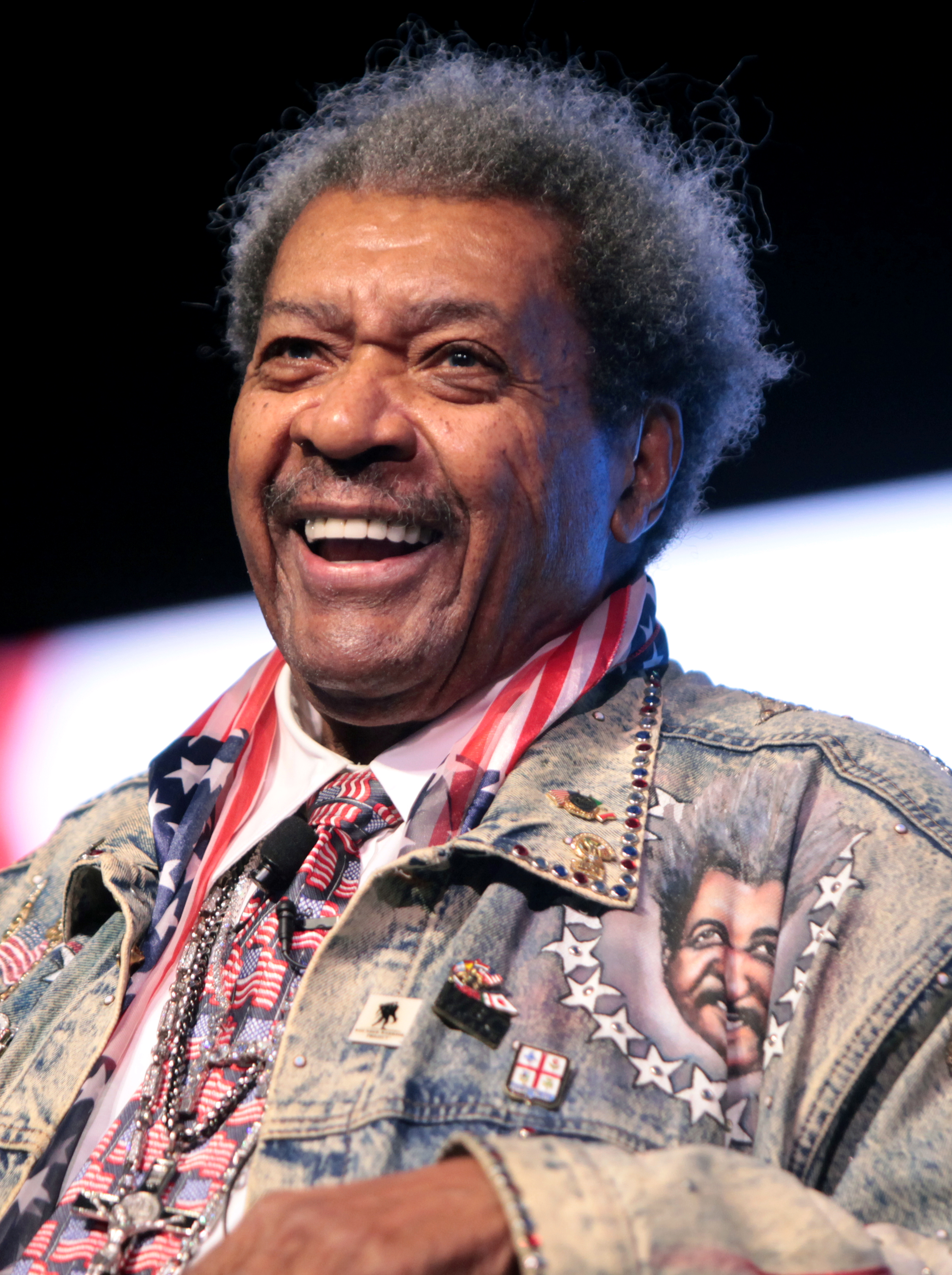
Don King

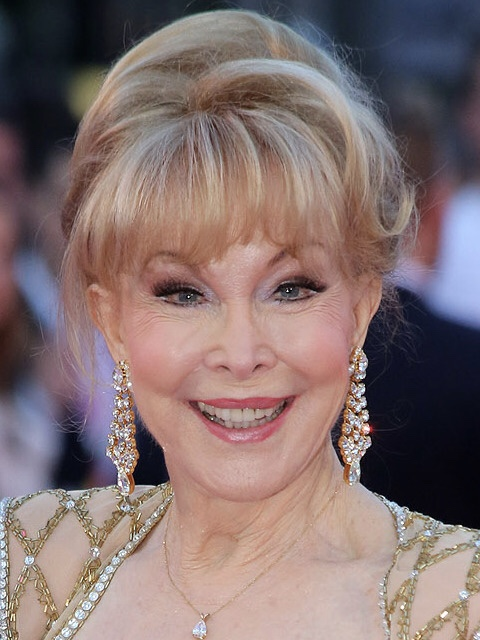
Barbara Eden

- August 1
  - Dino da Costa, Italian footballer (d. 2020)
  - Hal Connolly, American athlete (d. 2010)
- August 2 – Ruth Maria Kubitschek, German actress (d. 2024)
- August 3 – Vladimir Trusenyov, Russian discus thrower (d. 2001)
- August 6 – Mohammad-Reza Mahdavi Kani, Iranian cleric, writer and politician (d. 2014)
- August 8 – Roger Penrose, English mathematical physicist, Nobel Prize laureate
- August 9 – Mário Zagallo, Brazilian football player, manager (d. 2024)
- August 12 – William Goldman, American author (d. 2018)
- August 15
  - Talal bin Abdulaziz Al Saud, Saudi prince and politician (d. 2018)
  - Richard F. Heck, American chemist, recipient of the Nobel Prize in Chemistry (d. 2015)
- August 16 – Harold Bernard St. John, 3rd Prime Minister of Barbados (d. 2004)
- August 18 – Hans van Mierlo, Dutch politician, Minister of Foreign Affairs and Deputy Prime Minister (d. 2010)
- August 19 – Willie Shoemaker, American jockey (d. 2003)
- August 20 – Don King, American boxing promoter
- August 23
  - Barbara Eden, American actress
  - Hamilton O. Smith, American microbiologist, recipient of the Nobel Prize in Physiology or Medicine (d. 2025)
- August 27
  - Sri Chinmoy, Bengali spiritual teacher, poet, artist and athlete who immigrated to the U.S. in 1964 (d. 2007)
  - Clarence James, Bermudian surgeon, politician (d. 2016)
- August 28 – Shunichiro Okano, Japanese football player and manager (d. 2017)
- August 30
  - Jacques Braunstein, Romanian-born Venezuelan economist, publicist and disc jockey (d. 2009)
  - Jack Swigert, American astronaut (d. 1982)
- August 31 – Jean Béliveau, Canadian ice hockey player (d. 2014)

=== September ===
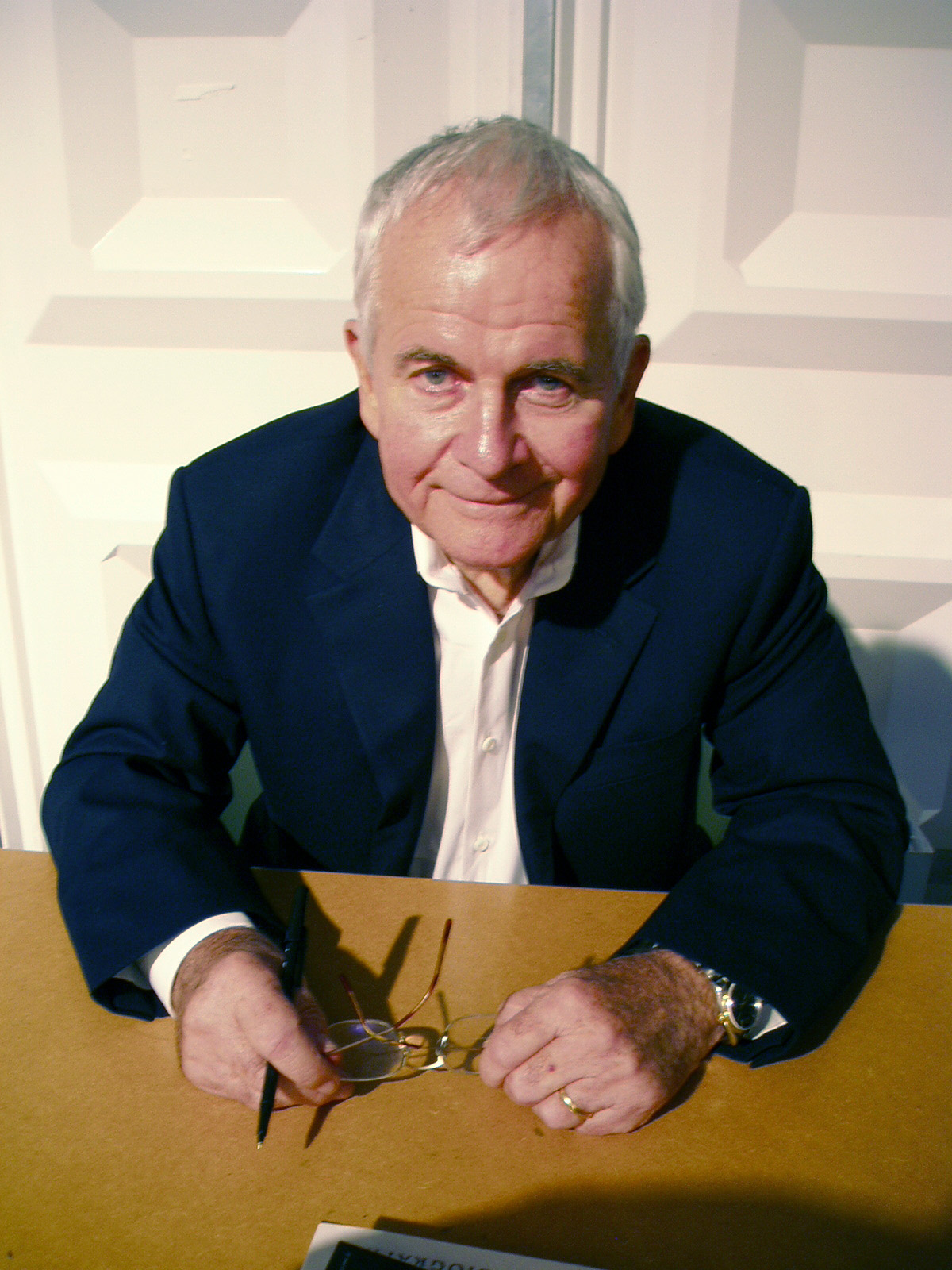
Ian Holm

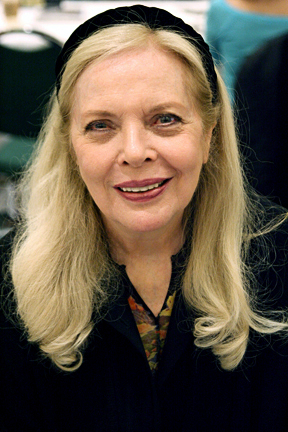
Barbara Bain

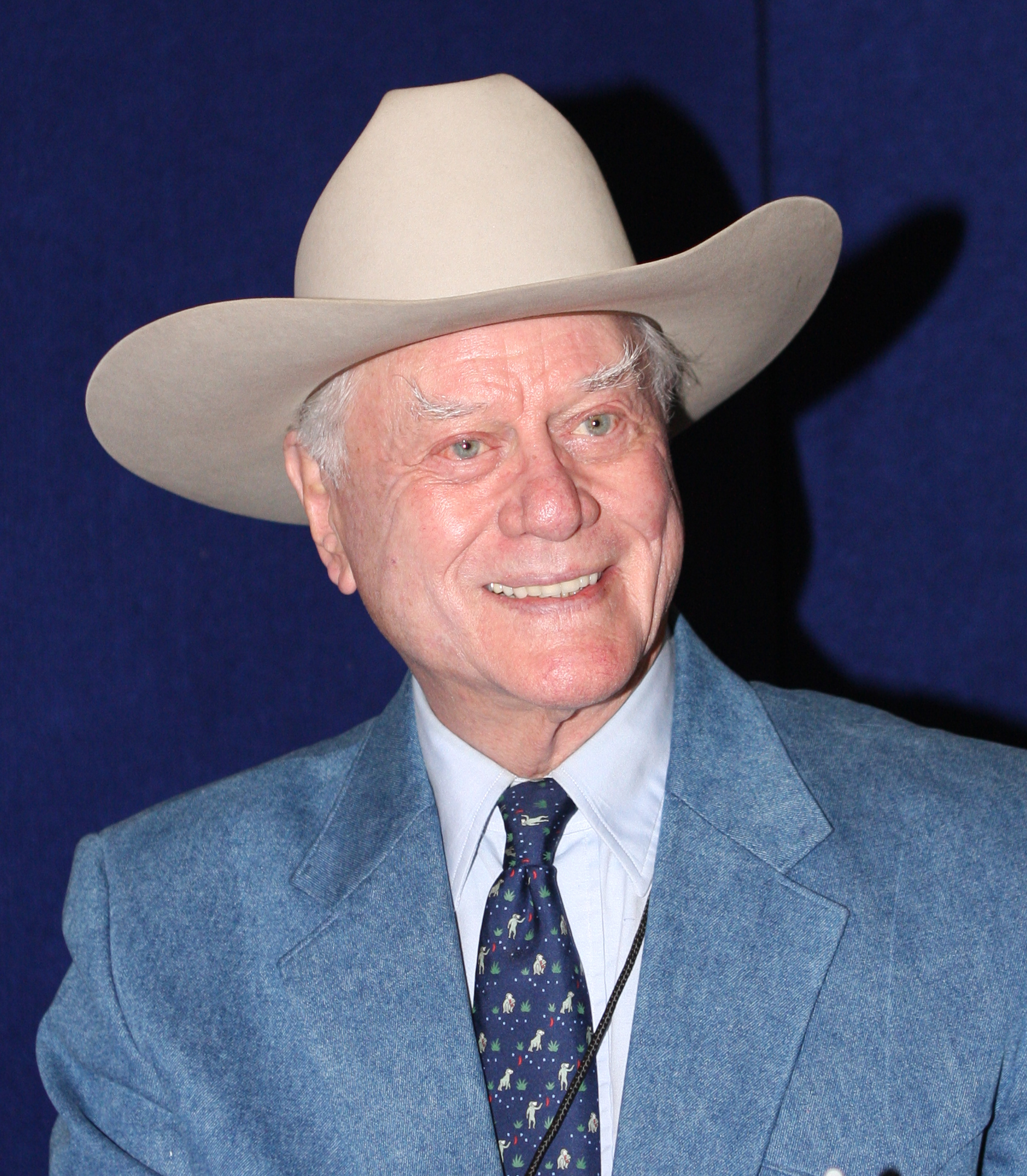
Larry Hagman

- September 2 – Zoltán Latinovits, Hungarian actor (d. 1976)
- September 3 – Paulo Maluf, Brazilian politician
- September 4
  - Javier Solís, Mexican singer and actor (d. 1966)
  - Mitzi Gaynor, American actress, singer and dancer (d. 2024)
- September 5 – Moshé Mizrahi, Israeli film director (d. 2018)
- September 10 – Idelisa Bonnelly, Dominican marine biologist (d. 2022)
- September 12
  - Ian Holm, British actor (d. 2020)
  - George Jones, American country music singer, songwriter (d. 2013)
  - Silvia Pinal, Mexican actress and politician (d. 2024)
- September 13 – Barbara Bain, American actress
- September 16 – E. C. George Sudarshan, Indian theoretical physicist (d. 2018)
- September 17
  - Princess Lalla Aicha of Morocco (d. 2011)
  - Anne Bancroft, American actress (d. 2005)
- September 19 – Brook Benton, American singer-songwriter (d. 1988)
- September 21
  - Larry Hagman, American actor and director (d. 2012)
  - Syukuro Manabe, Japanese meteorologist, climatologist and Nobel Prize laureate
  - Paulias Matane, 8th Governor-General of Papua New Guinea (d. 2021)
- September 22 – Fay Weldon, British author (d. 2023)
- September 24
  - Tom Adams, 2nd Prime Minister of Barbados (d. 1985)
  - Elizabeth Blackadder, Scottish painter (d. 2021)
- September 27 – Freddy Quinn, Austrian singer, actor
- September 29
  - James Cronin, American nuclear physicist, recipient of the Nobel Prize in Physics (d. 2016)
  - Anita Ekberg, Swedish actress (d. 2015)
  - Pié Masumbuko, Burundian former prime minister and physician (d. 2026)
- September 30 – Angie Dickinson, American actress

=== October ===
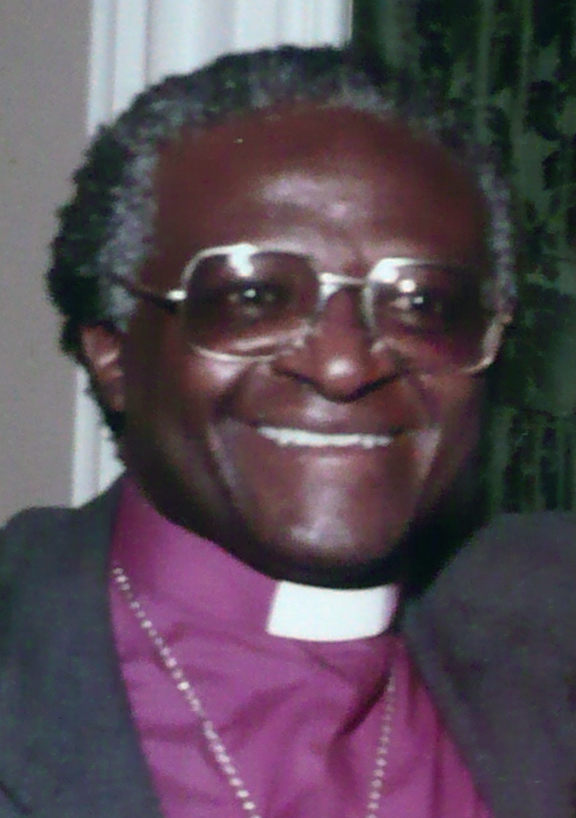
Desmond Tutu

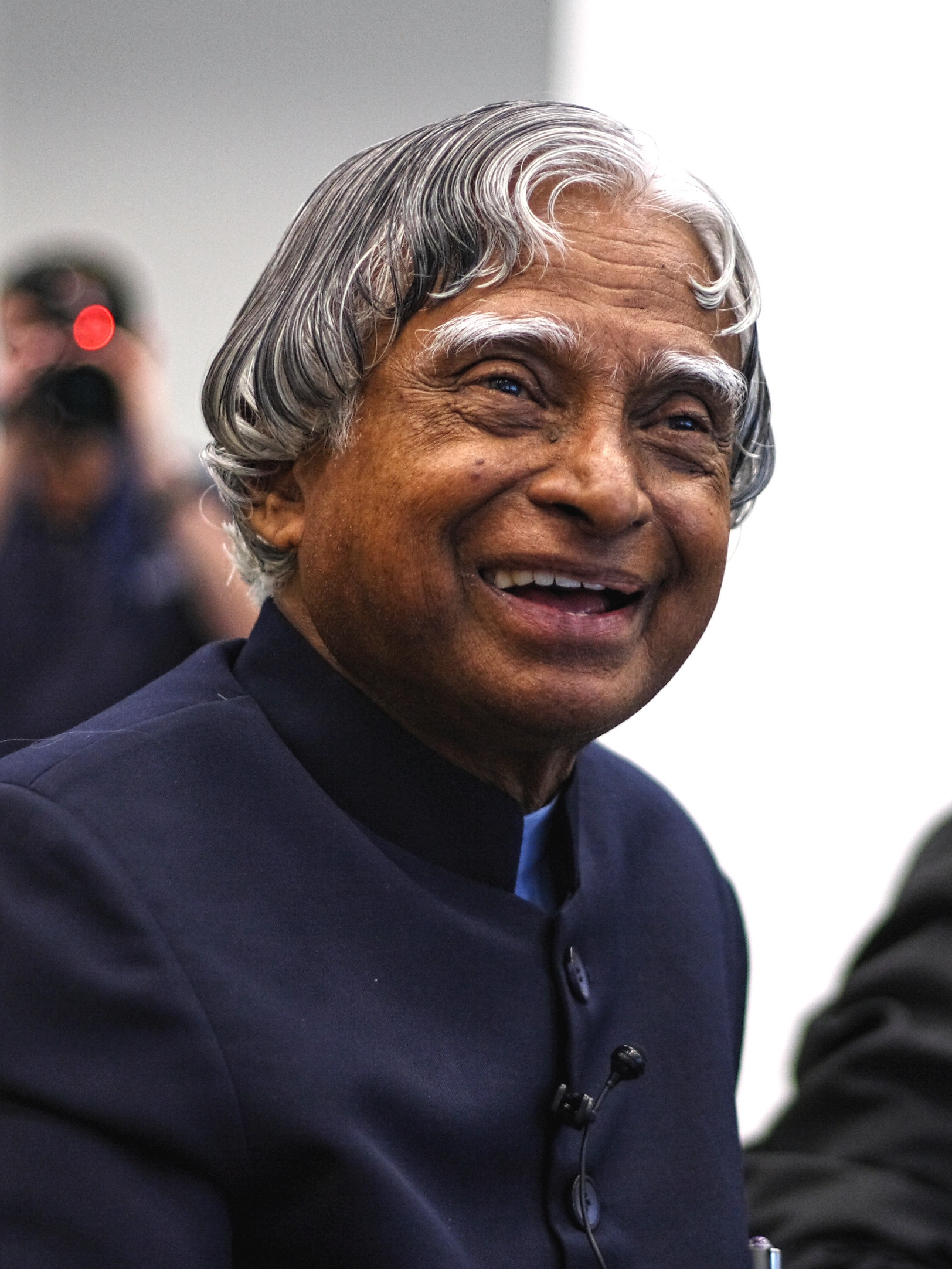
A. P. J. Abdul Kalam

- October 3
  - Denise Scott Brown, American architect
  - Glenn Hall, Canadian ice hocker player (d. 2026)
- October 4 – Richard Rorty, American philosopher (d. 2007)
- October 6 – Riccardo Giacconi, Italian-born astrophysicist, recipient of the Nobel Prize in Physics (d. 2018)
- October 7
  - Desmond Tutu, South African Anglican archbishop, activist and recipient of the Nobel Peace Prize (d. 2021)
  - Jack Berry, American sports journalist (d. 2026)
- October 13 – Raymond Kopa, French footballer (d. 2017)
- October 15 – A. P. J. Abdul Kalam, President of India (d. 2015)
- October 16 – Charles Colson, American politician, Watergate conspirator, later evangelist (d. 2012)
- October 17 – José Alencar, Brazilian politician (d. 2011)
- October 19
  - Rubens de Falco, Brazilian actor (d. 2008)
  - John le Carré, English novelist (d. 2020)
  - Manolo Escobar, Spanish singer and actor (d. 2013)
- October 20 – Mickey Mantle, American baseball player (d. 1995)
- October 21 – Shammi Kapoor, Indian film actor, director (d. 2011)
- October 23 – Diana Dors, English actress (d. 1984)
- October 25
  - Klaus Hasselmann, German oceanographer, climate modeller and Nobel Prize laureate
  - Jimmy McIlroy, Northern Irish football player and manager (d. 2018)
- October 27 – Nawal El Saadawi, Egyptian feminist (d. 2021)
- October 28 – Analía Gadé, Argentine actress (d. 2019)
- October 31
  - Sergio Obeso Rivera, Mexican Roman Catholic cardinal (d. 2019)
  - Dan Rather, American television news reporter (CBS Evening News)

=== November ===
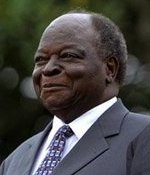
Mwai Kibaki

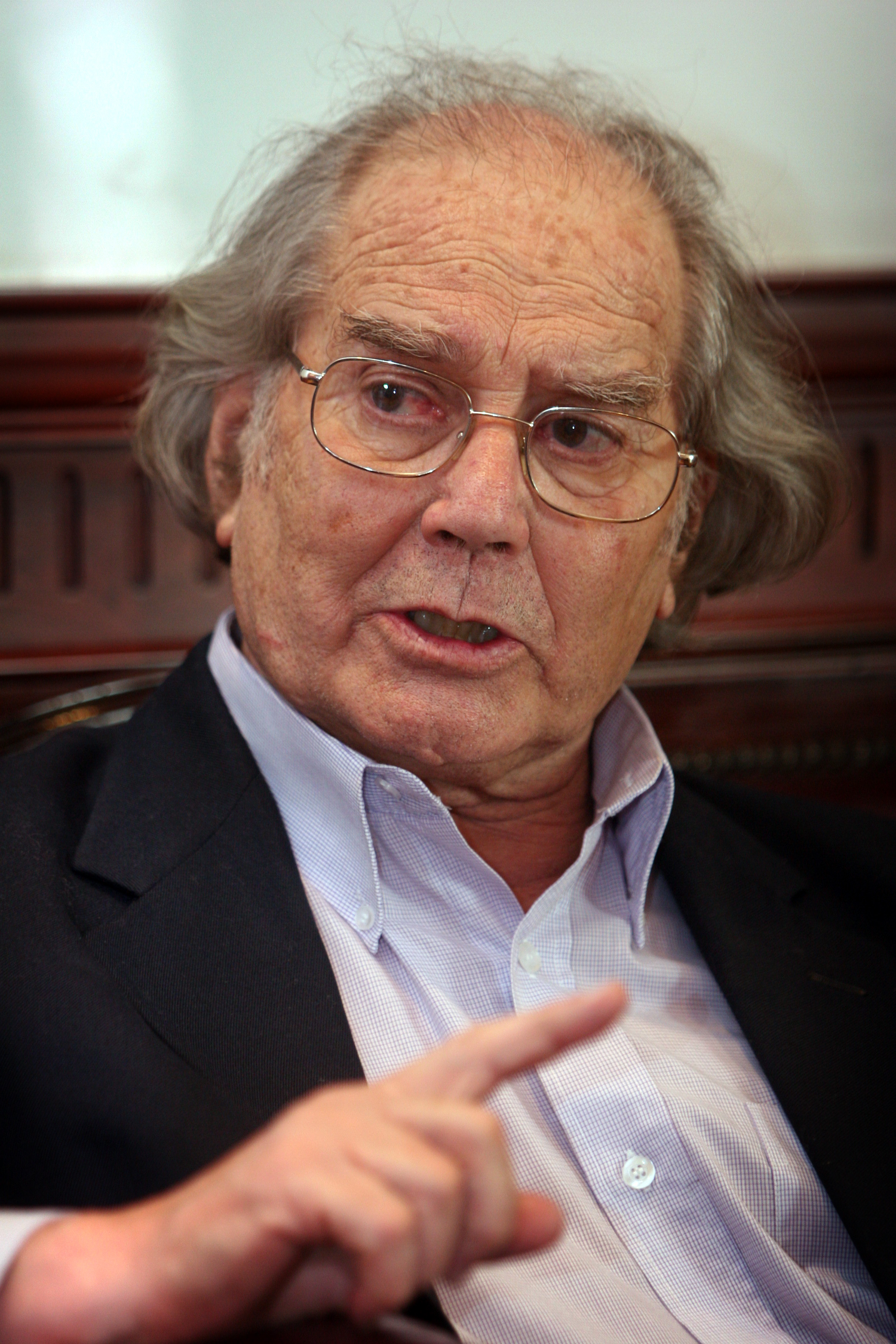
Adolfo Pérez Esquivel

- November 1 – Shunsuke Kikuchi, Japanese composer (d. 2021)
- November 2 – Phil Woods, American saxophonist (d. 2015)
- November 3
  - Michael Fu Tieshan, Chinese Catholic Patriotic Association bishop (d. 2007)
  - Monica Vitti, Italian actress (d. 2022)
- November 5 – Ike Turner, American singer, songwriter (d. 2007)
- November 6
  - Peter Collins, British racing driver (d. 1958)
  - Mike Nichols, German-American television actor, writer and director (d. 2014)
- November 12 – Majida Boulila, Tunisian militant (d. 1952)
- November 15
  - Mwai Kibaki, 3rd President of Kenya (d. 2022)
  - Pascal Lissouba, President of the Republic of Congo (d. 2020)
- November 21 – Malcolm Williamson, Australian composer (d. 2003)
- November 26 – Adolfo Pérez Esquivel, Argentine activist, recipient of the Nobel Peace Prize
- November 28 – Tomi Ungerer, French artist, illustrator and writer (d. 2019)
- November 29 – Shintaro Katsu, Japanese actor (d. 1997)

=== December ===
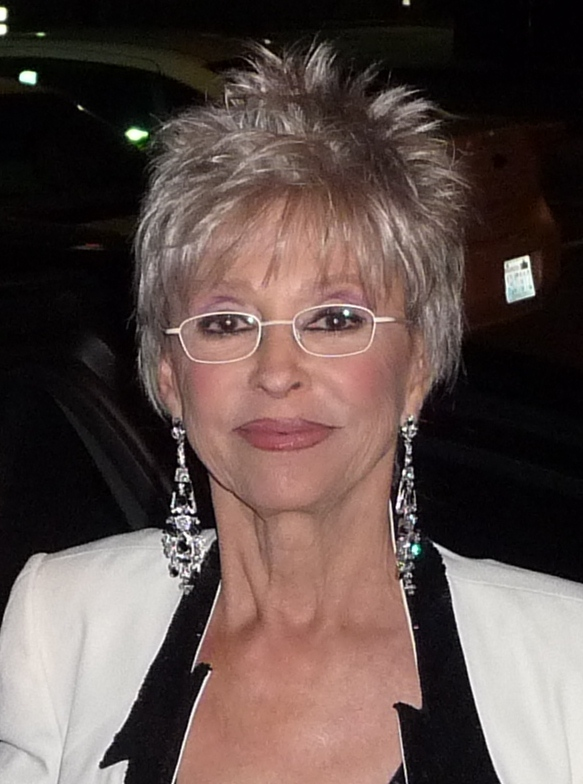
Rita Moreno

- December 1
  - Rajko Kuzmanović, 7th President of Republika Srpska
  - George Maxwell Richards, President of Trinidad and Tobago (d. 2018)
  - Muhammad Jamiruddin Sircar, Bangladeshi barrister and politician (d. 2026)
- December 2 – Wynton Kelly, Jamaican-American jazz pianist, composer (d. 1971)
- December 3 – Elizabeth Ramsey, Filipina singer and actress (d. 2015)
- December 5 – Jayant Ganpat Nadkarni, Indian Navy admiral (d. 2018)
- December 6 – Aurora Cornu, Romanian writer and actress (d. 2021)
- December 7 – Carmela Rey, Mexican singer, actress (d. 2018)
- December 9
  - Luigi Ornaghi, Italian actor and farmer (d. 2006)
  - Ladislav Smoljak, Czech film, theater director, actor and screenwriter (d. 2010)
- December 11 – Rita Moreno, Puerto-Rican actress (West Side Story)
- December 13 – Ida Vos, Dutch Jewish author of books for children and adults (d. 2006)
- December 15 – Klaus Rifbjerg, Danish writer (d. 2015)
- December 20 – Abdullah H. Abdur-Razzaq, African-American activist and Muslim (d. 2014)
- December 21
  - Redha Malek, 8th Prime Minister of Algeria (d. 2017)
  - Georgi Naydenov, Bulgarian footballer and manager (d. 1970)
- December 22 – Carlos Graça, 6th Prime Minister of São Tomé and Príncipe (d. 2013)
- December 24
  - Walter Abish, Austrian-born American writer (d. 2022)
  - Mauricio Kagel, Argentine composer (d. 2008)
- December 26 – Roger Piantoni, French footballer (d. 2018)
- December 27
  - John Charles, Welsh international footballer (d. 2004)
  - Scotty Moore, American guitarist (d. 2016)
  - Lê Khả Phiêu, Vietnamese politician (d. 2020)
- December 30
  - Charles Bassett, American electrical engineer, astronaut (d. 1966)
  - Skeeter Davis, American singer (d. 2004)

== Deaths ==
=== January ===
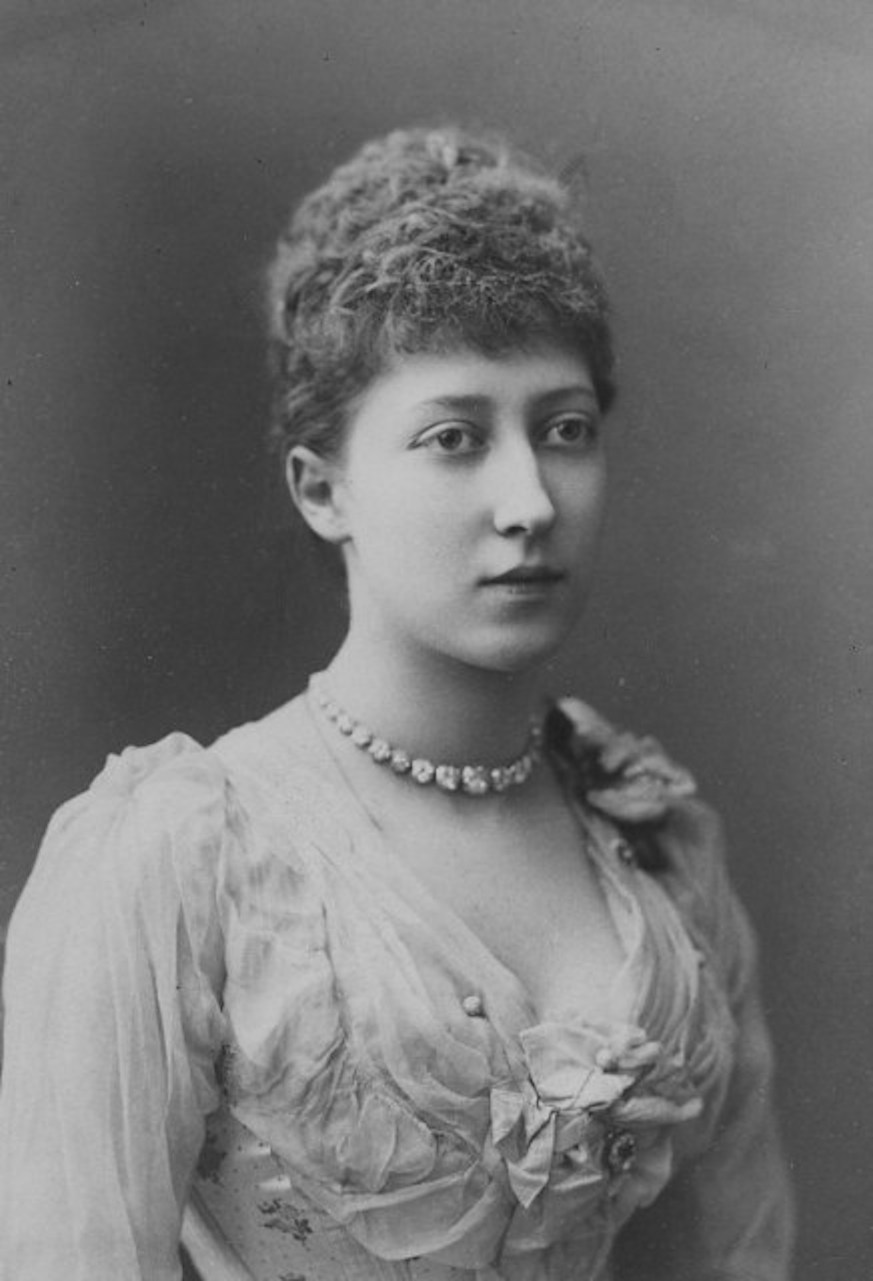
Louise, Princess Royal

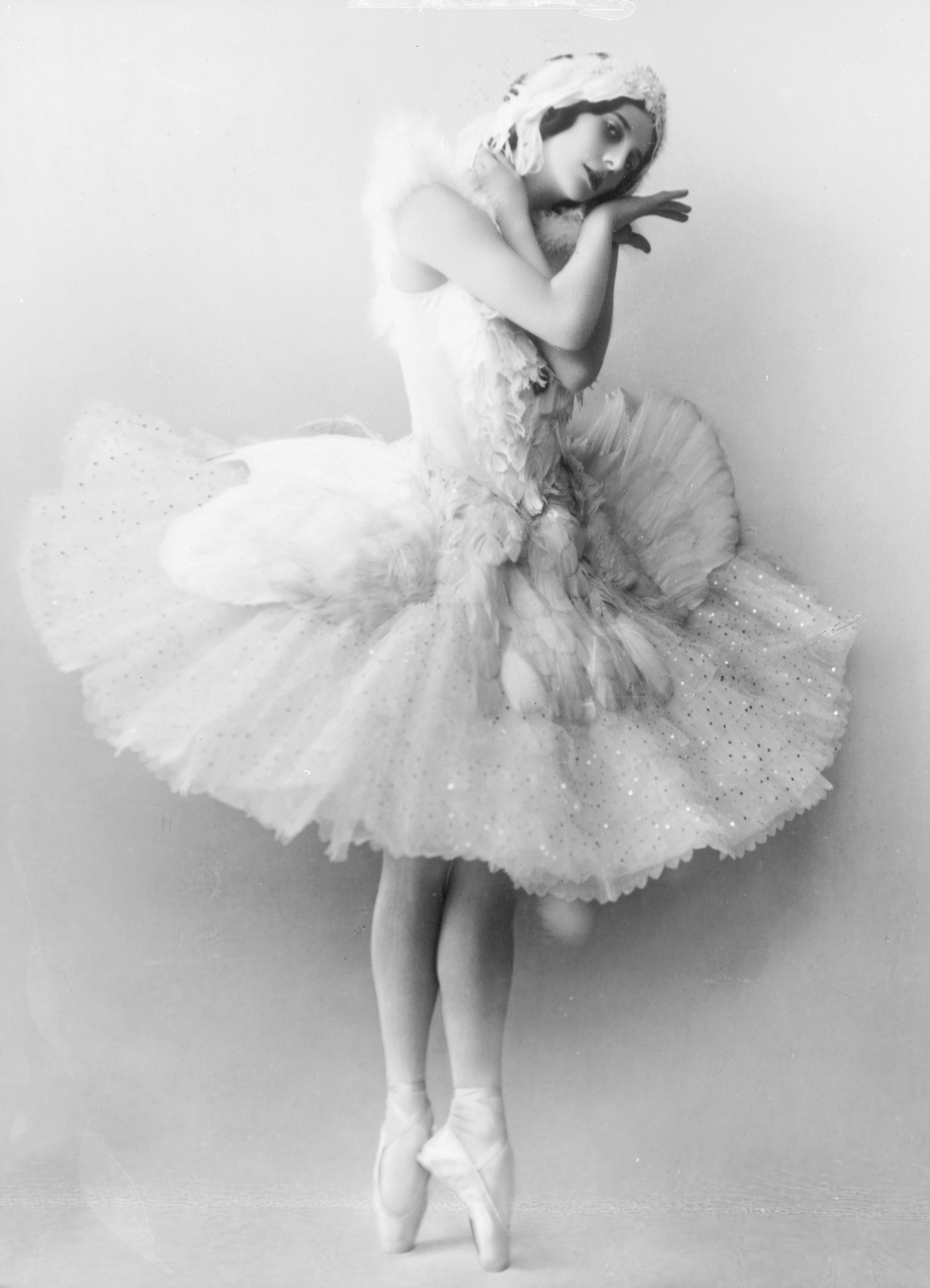
Anna Pavlova

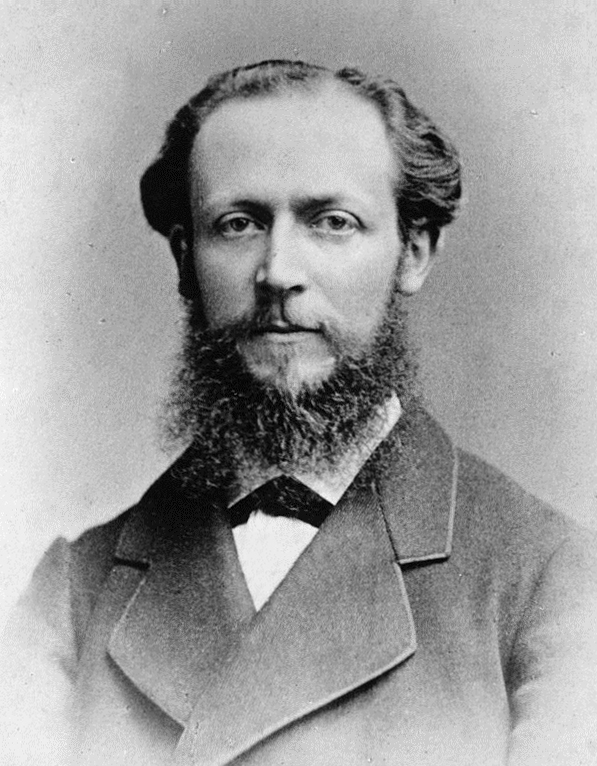
Otto Wallach

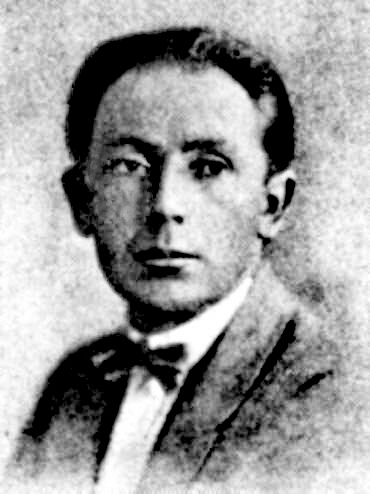
F. W. Murnau

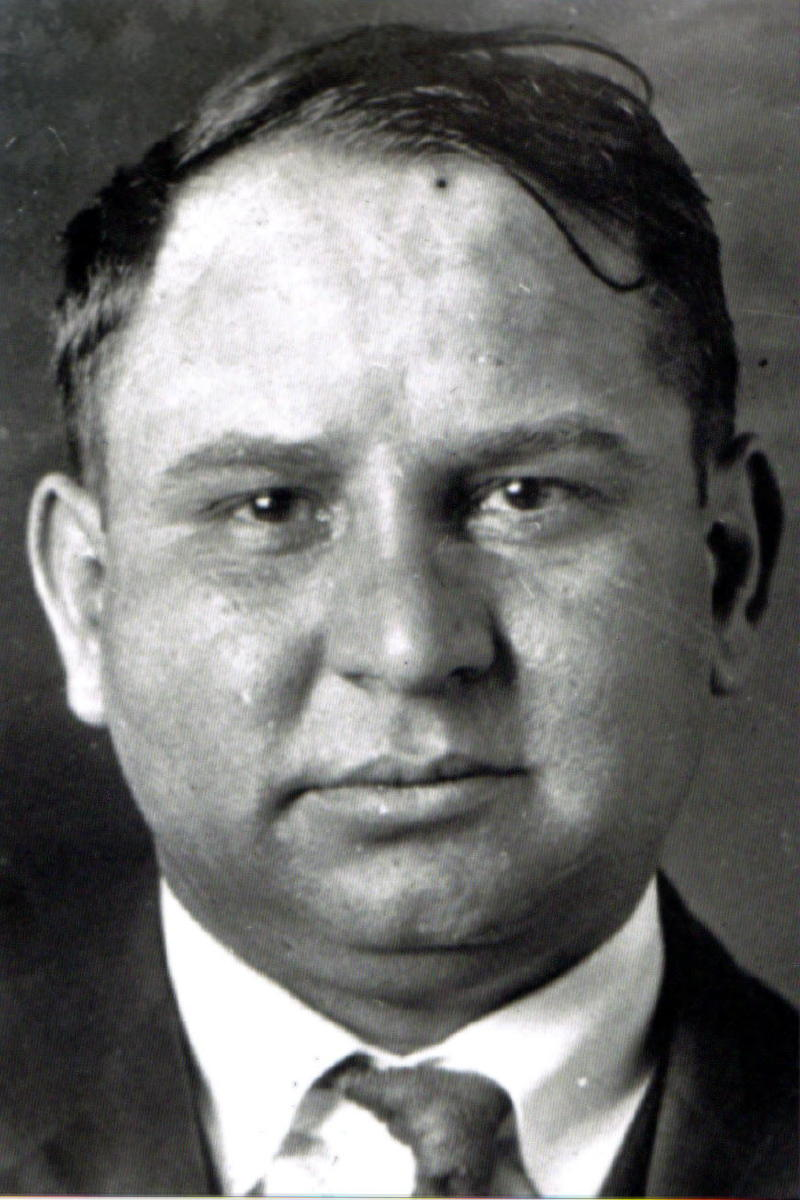
Joe Masseria

- January 3 – Joseph Joffre, French World War I general (b. 1852)
- January 4
  - Art Acord, American actor (b. 1890)
  - Roger Connor, American baseball player, MLB Hall of Famer (b. 1857)
  - Louise, Princess Royal, British royal, eldest daughter of Edward VII of the United Kingdom (b. 1867)
- January 10 – James Milton Carroll, American Baptist pastor, historian, and author (b. 1852)
- January 14 – Hardy Richardson, American baseball player (b. 1855)
- January 17 – Grand Duke Peter Nikolaevich of Russia (b. 1864)
- January 22 – Alma Rubens, American actress (b. 1897)
- January 23
  - Anna Pavlova, Soviet ballerina (b. 1881)
  - Ernst Seidler von Feuchtenegg, former Minister-President of Austria (b. 1862)
- January 24 – Sir Percy FitzPatrick, South African author, politician and mining financier (b. 1862)
- January 28 – Bernardo Soto Alfaro, 14th President of Costa Rica (b. 1854)
- January 29 – Henri Mathias Berthelot, French general (b. 1861)

=== February ===
- February 1 – Prince Emmanuel, Duke of Vendome (b. 1872)
- February 9 – Mammad Hasan Hajinski, last Prime Minister of the Azerbaijan Democratic Republic (b.1875)
- February 11 – Sir Charles Parsons, British inventor (b. 1854)
- February 13 – Martin von Feuerstein, German painter (b. 1865)
- February 16 – Wilhelm von Gloeden, German photographer (b. 1856)
- February 18 – Louis Wolheim, American actor (b. 1880)
- February 19 – Tovmas Nazarbekian, Armenian general (b. 1855)
- February 23
  - Eduard von Capelle, German admiral (b. 1855)
  - Dame Nellie Melba, Australian soprano (b. 1861)
- February 24 – Frederick Augustus II, Grand Duke of Oldenburg (b. 1852)
- February 26 – Otto Wallach, German chemist, Nobel Prize laureate (b. 1847)
- February 27 – Chandra Shekhar Azad, Indian revolutionary (b. 1906)
- February 28 – Thomas S. Rodgers, American admiral (b. 1858)

=== March ===
- March 5 – Arthur Tooth, Anglican clergyman (b. 1839)
- March 7
  - Akseli Gallen-Kallela, Finnish painter (b. 1865)
  - Theo van Doesburg, Dutch painter (b. 1883)
- March 11 – F. W. Murnau, German director (b. 1888)
- March 16 – Sir Charles Eliot, British diplomat (b. 1862)
- March 20
  - Alfred Giles, Australian explorer (b. 1846)
  - Hermann Müller, German journalist, politician and 12th Chancellor of Germany (b. 1876)
  - Joseph B. Murdock, United States Navy admiral, New Hampshire politician (b. 1851)
- March 22 – James Campbell, 1st Baron Glenavy, Irish lawyer, politician (b. 1851)
- March 23 – Bhagat Singh, Indian revolutionary (b. 1907)
- March 24 – Robert Edeson, American actor (b. 1868)
- March 25 – Ida B. Wells, African-American anti-lynching crusader (b. 1862)
- March 27 – Arnold Bennett, British novelist (b. 1867)

=== April ===
- April 4 – André Michelin, French industrialist and originator of Michelin Guides (born 1854)
- April 8 – Erik Axel Karlfeldt, Swedish writer, Nobel Prize laureate (b. 1864)
- April 9 – Nicholas Longworth, American politician, Speaker of the House (b. 1869)
- April 10 – Khalil Gibran, Lebanese poet, painter (b. 1883)
- April 15
  - Joe Masseria, Italian-born American gangster (b. 1886)
  - Prince Thomas, Duke of Genoa (b. 1854)
  - Jacob Hägg, Swedish admiral and painter (b. 1839)
- April 16 – Rachel Bluwstein, Israeli poet (b. 1890)
- April 20 – Sir Cosmo Duff-Gordon, Scottish landowner, Titanic survivor (b. 1862)
- April 26 – George Herbert Mead, American philosopher, sociologist and psychologist (b. 1863)
- April 27 – Albert, Duke of Schleswig-Holstein (b. 1869)
- April 30 – Sammy Woods, English cricketer (b. 1867)

=== May ===
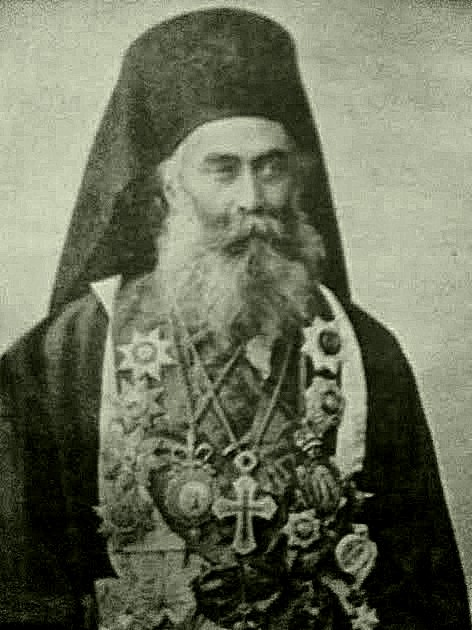
Patriarch Damian I of Jerusalem

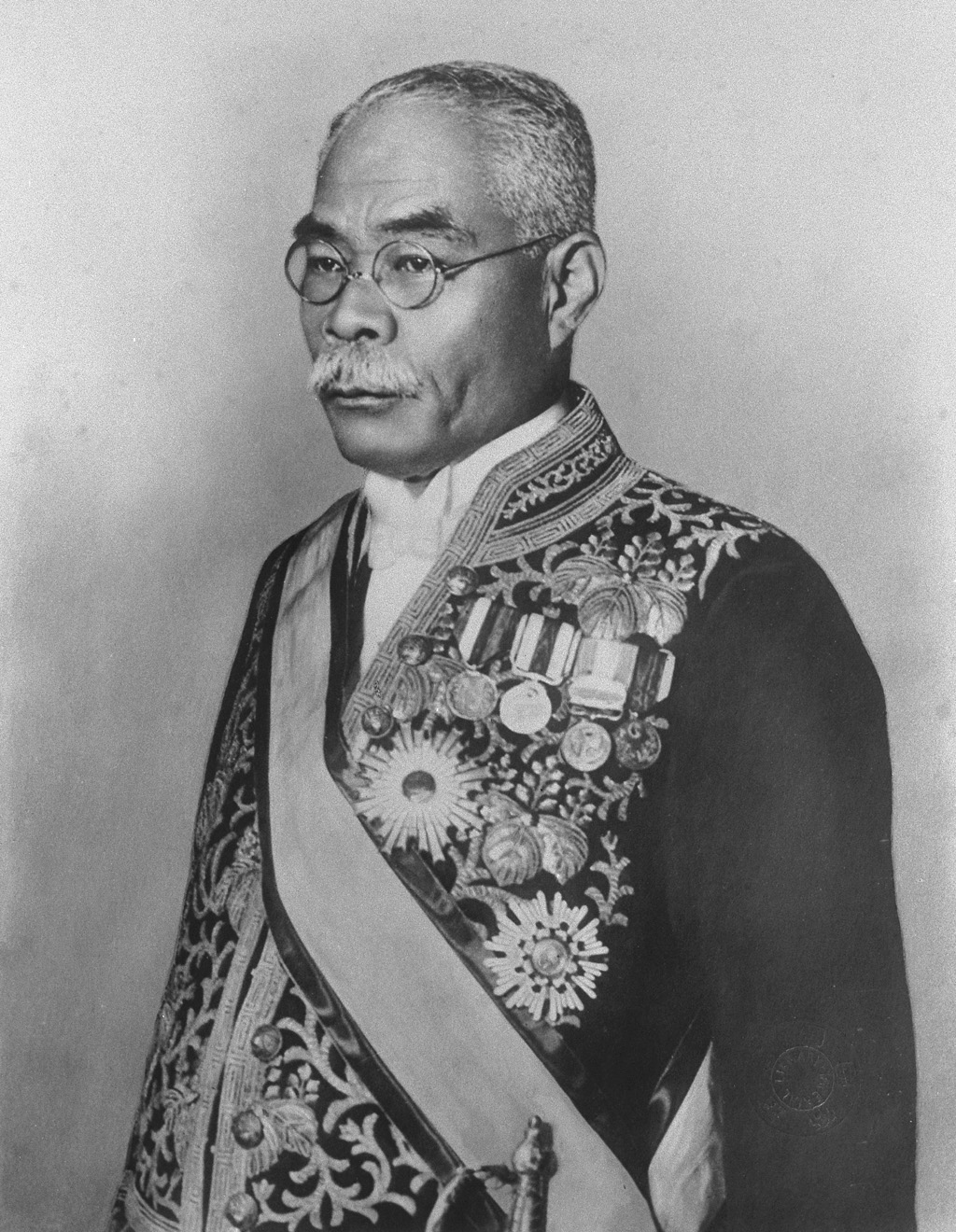
Hamaguchi Osachi

- May 2 – George Fisher Baker, American financier, philanthropist (b. 1840)
- May 9 – Albert A. Michelson, German-born physicist, Nobel Prize laureate (b. 1852)
- May 14 – David Belasco, American Broadway impresario, theater owner and playwright (b. 1853)
- May 19 – Ralph Barton, American artist (b. 1891)
- May 26 – Anna Sandström, Swedish social reformer (b. 1854)

=== June ===
- June 2 – Joseph W. Farnham, American screenwriter (b. 1884)
- June 4 – Hussein bin Ali, Sharif of Mecca, Arab nationalist
- June 8 – Virginia Frances Sterrett, American artist, illustrator (b. 1900)
- June 13
  - Jesse Boot, 1st Baron Trent, British businessman (b. 1850)
  - Kitasato Shibasaburō, Japanese physician and bacteriologist (b. 1853)
- June 21 – Pio del Pilar, Filipino activist (b. 1860)
- June 22 – Armand Fallières, 9th President of France (b. 1841)

=== July ===
- July 2 – Peter Kürten, German serial killer (executed) (b. 1883)
- July 4
  - Buddie Petit, American jazz musician
  - Prince Emanuele Filiberto, 2nd Duke of Aosta, Italian general, Marshal of Italy (b. 1869)
- July 9 – T. Adelaide Goodno, American social reformer (b. 1858)
- July 11 – William Jasper Spillman, American economist (b. 1863)
- July 12 – Nathan Söderblom, Swedish archbishop, recipient of the Nobel Peace Prize (b. 1866)

=== August ===
- August 6 – Bix Beiderbecke, American jazz trumpeter (b. 1903)
- August 11 – Linda Loredo, Mexican-American actress and dancer (b. 1907)
- August 14 – Patriarch Damian I of Jerusalem (b. 1848)
- August 15 – Nigar Shikhlinskaya, Azerbaijani World War I nurse (b. 1878)
- August 22 – Joseph Tabrar, British songwriter (b. 1857)
- August 26
  - Frank Harris, Irish author and editor (b. 1856)
  - Hamaguchi Osachi, Japanese politician, 27th Prime Minister of Japan (b. 1870)
- August 27 – Francis Marion Smith, American businessman (b. 1846)

=== September ===
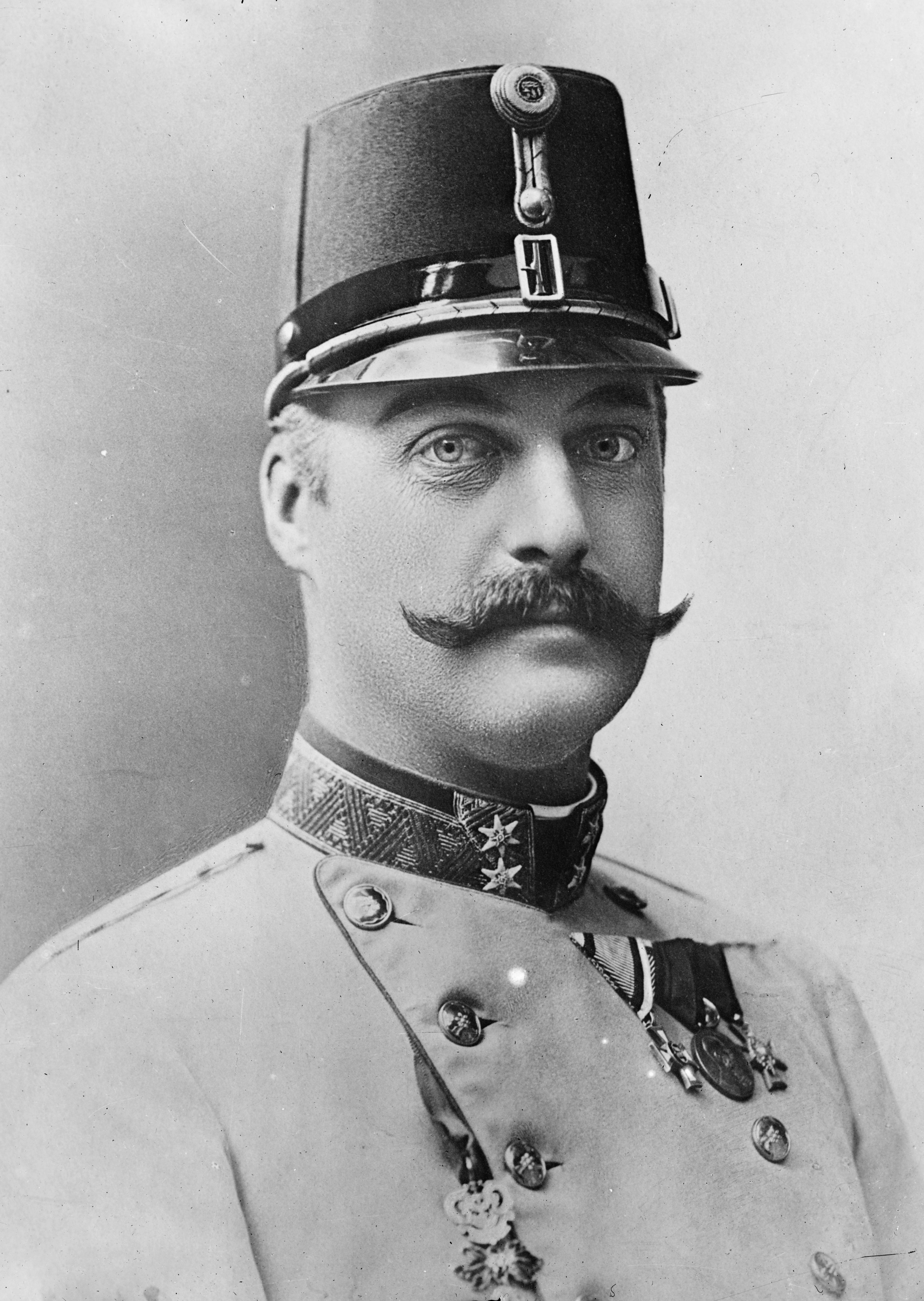
Archduke Leopold Salvator of Austria

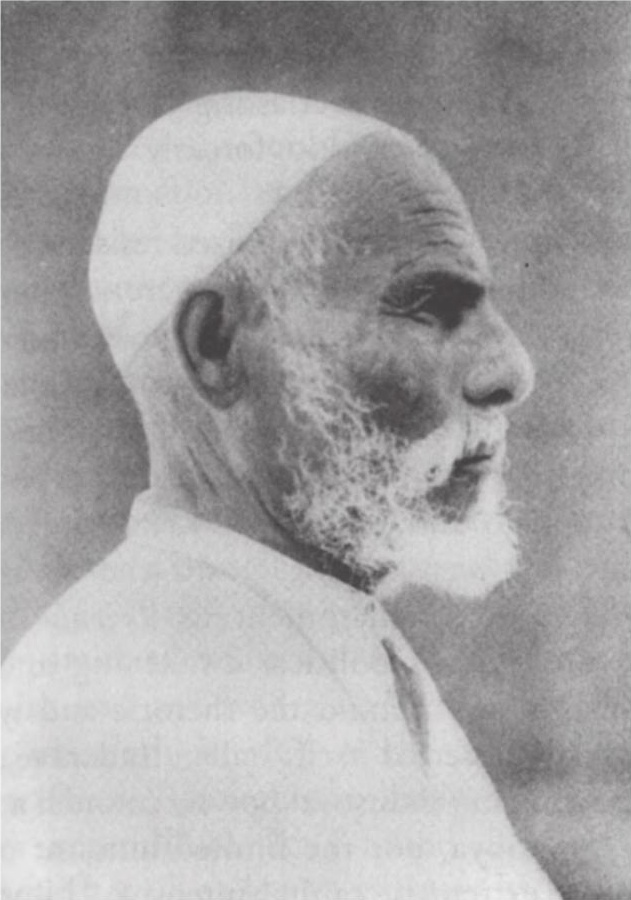
Omar al-Mukhtar

- September 4 – Archduke Leopold Salvator of Austria (b. 1863)
- September 5 – John Thomson, Scottish footballer (b. 1909)
- September 7 – Federico Tinoco Granados, 21st President of Costa Rica (b. 1868)
- September 9 – Lujo Brentano, German economist (b. 1844)
- September 10 – Salvatore Maranzano, Italian mobster (b. 1886)
- September 12
  - Francis J. Higginson, United States Navy admiral (b. 1843)
  - Joseph Le Brix, French aviator, naval officer (b. 1899)
- September 13 – Prince Friedrich Leopold of Prussia (b. 1866)
- September 14 – Tom Roberts, English-born Australian artist (b. 1856)
- September 16 – Omar al-Mukhtar, Libyan resistance leader (b. 1858)
- September 17
  - Marcello Amero D'Aste, Italian admiral, politician (b. 1853)
  - Marvin Hart, American world heavyweight boxing champion (b. 1876)
- September 18 – Geli Raubal, Austrian niece of Adolf Hitler (suicide; b. 1908)
- September 19 – David Starr Jordan, American ichthyologist, educator, eugenicist, and peace activist (b. 1851)
- September 29 – Sir William Orpen, Irish artist (b. 1878)

=== October ===
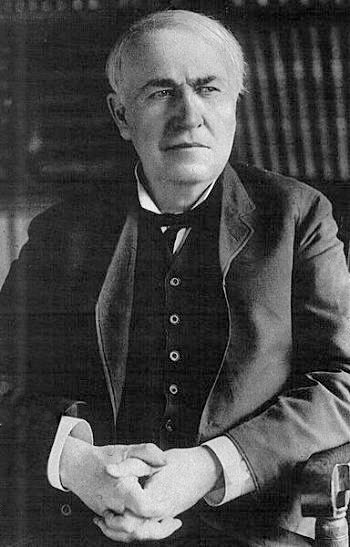
Thomas Edison

- October 2 – Sir Thomas Lipton, Scottish retailer and yachtsman (b. 1848)
- October 3 – Carl Nielsen, Danish composer (b. 1865)
- October 7 – Daniel Chester French, American sculptor (b. 1850)
- October 8 – John Monash, Australian general (b. 1865)
- October 13 – Ernst Didring, Swedish writer (b. 1868)
- October 18 – Thomas Edison, American inventor (b. 1847)
- October 21 – Arthur Schnitzler, Austrian dramatist and author (b. 1862)
- October 24 – Sir Murray Bisset, South African cricketer, Governor of Southern Rhodesia (b. 1876)

=== November ===
- November 4 – Buddy Bolden, American musician (b. 1877)
- November 6 – Jack Chesbro, American baseball player, MLB Hall of Famer (b. 1874)
- November 10 – Charlotte Scott, English mathematician (b. 1858)
- November 11 – Shibusawa Eiichi, Japanese industrialist (b. 1840)
- November 13 – Ivan Fichev, Bulgarian general, minister of defense, military historian, and academician (b. 1860)
- November 17 – Hara Prasad Shastri, Indian academic and Sanskrit scholar (b. 1853)
- November 21 – Bruno von Mudra, German general (b. 1851)
- November 27 – Robert Ames, American actor (b. 1889)

=== December ===
- December 2 – Vincent d'Indy, French composer (b. 1851)
- December 5 – Vachel Lindsay, American poet (b. 1879)
- December 9 – Antonio Salandra, Italian statesman, 21st Prime Minister of Italy (b. 1853)
- December 18 – Jack Diamond, American gangster (b. 1897)
- December 23 – Tyrone Power Sr., English-born American actor (b. 1869)
- December 24 – Carlo Fornasini, micropalaeontologist (b. 1854)
- December 26 – Melvil Dewey, American librarian, inventor of the Dewey Decimal Classification (b. 1851)
- December 27 – José Figueroa Alcorta, Argentine politician, 16th President of Argentina (b. 1860)

== Nobel Prizes ==

- Physics – not awarded
- Chemistry – Carl Bosch, Friedrich Bergius
- Physiology or Medicine – Otto Heinrich Warburg
- Literature – Erik Axel Karlfeldt
- Peace – Jane Addams, Nicholas Murray Butler
