= Themes in Titus Andronicus =

Although traditionally Titus Andronicus has been seen as one of Shakespeare's least respected plays, its fortunes have changed somewhat in the latter half of the twentieth century, with numerous scholars arguing that the play is more significant and effective than has been acknowledged in most criticisms. In particular, scholars have argued that the play is far more thematically complex than has traditionally been thought, and features profound insights into ancient Rome, Elizabethan society, and the human condition. Such scholars tend to argue that these previously unacknowledged insights have only become apparent during the twentieth and twenty-first centuries due to newfound relevance in the play's ultraviolent content. For example, in his 1987 edition of the play for the Contemporary Shakespeare series, A.L. Rowse writes; "in the civilized Victorian age the play could not be performed because it could not be believed. Such is the horror of our own age, with the appalling barbarities of prison camps and resistance movements paralleling the torture and mutilation and feeding on human flesh of the play, that it has ceased to be improbable." Similarly, director Julie Taymor, who staged a production Off-Broadway in 1994 and directed a film version in 1999, says she was drawn to the play because she found it to be the most "relevant of Shakespeare's plays for the modern era." She feels that the play has more relevance for contemporary audiences than it had for the Victorians: "it seems like a play written for today, it reeks of now." Because of these newer appreciations of the play's relevance, previously unrecognized thematic strands have thus come to the forefront.

== Revenge ==
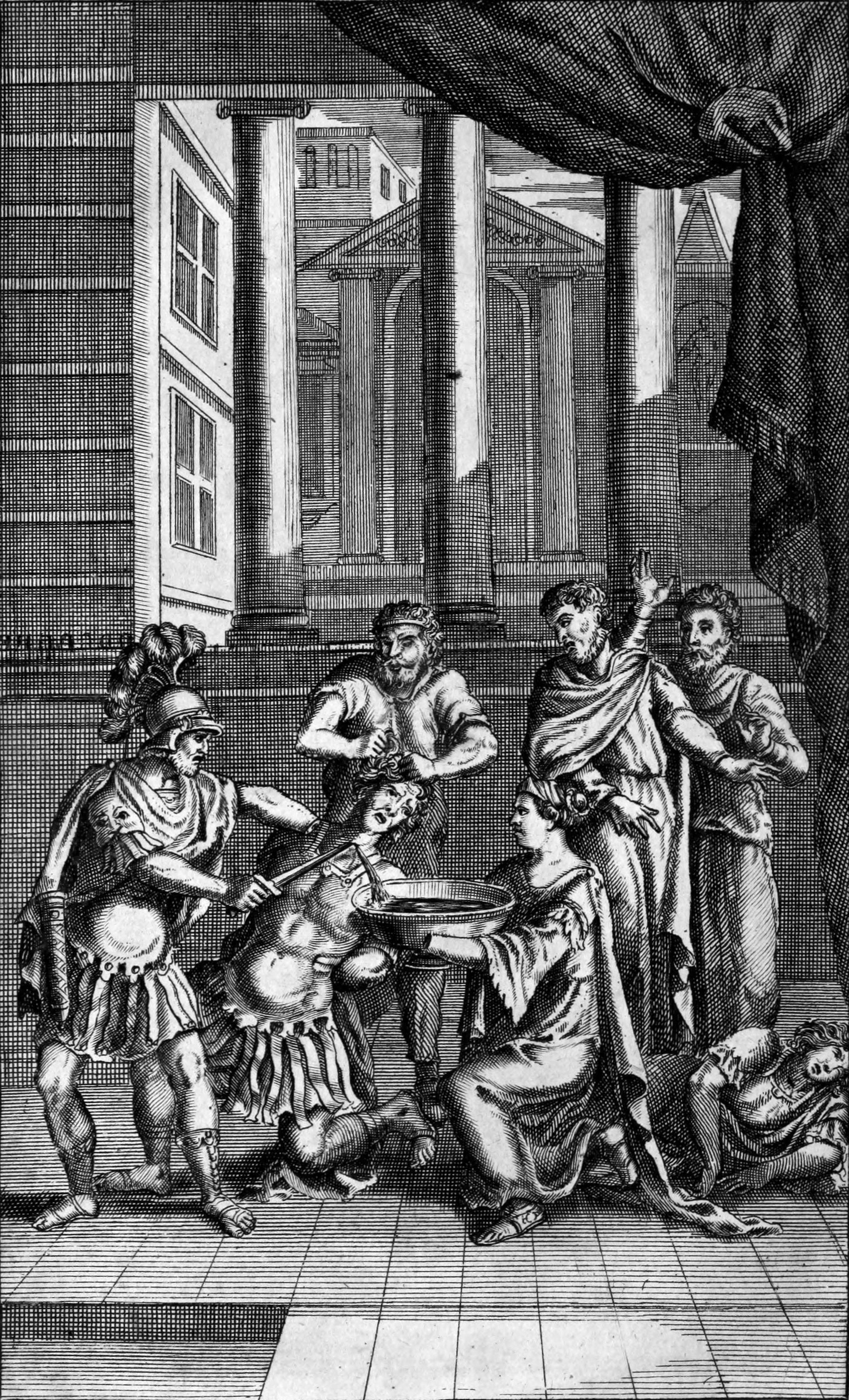
Titus exacts his revenge for the rape of Lavinia by killing Chiron and Demetrius and draining their blood; illustration from The Works of Mr. William Shakespeare, edited by Nicholas Rowe (1709)

The most prominent theme in Titus Andronicus and the one most often dissected in scholarship is revenge. The story of Procne and Philomela is mentioned several times, and just as they are driven by a desire for revenge, so too are the characters in Titus; the entire narrative from midway through Act 1 is built around the plotting of revenge. According to Hereward Thimbleby Price, Shakespeare "is writing a Senecan play according to the rules, that is to say, a play in which the hero is a man who inexorably pursues revenge and who dies in the act of taking it." Bill Alexander, who directed a Royal Shakespeare Company production in 2003, argues that

the play is largely about revenge and the desire to take revenge. I think that everyone understands on some level that revenge is something you might feel from time to time. The play asks the question "At what point is it right for an individual to take revenge because there is no other way of redressing wrongs?" One of the great things about Shakespeare is that he never attempts to answer such questions, he simply poses them. Titus Andronicus poses the question of revenge, so it can't not be relevant. Everyone has an opinion about when revenge becomes justified and whether the nature of being civilised and human demands that something like revenge is excluded, or must be excluded, from the imagination ... In a sense the play is there to evoke our humanity and our sense of pity about what human beings can do to each other and about what revenge does to human souls. Revenge can drive people mad, and madness can drive people to revenge."

The theme of revenge is introduced very early in the play. In the opening scene, we learn that some of Titus' sons have been killed during the war with the Goths, and as a result, Titus feels compelled to sacrifice Tamora's son, Alarbus. Here revenge takes on a religious duty as Titus claims of his dead sons, "Religiously they ask a sacrifice" (l.124). The sacrifice of Alarbus, however, prompts a desire for revenge in his family. As Demetrius tells Tamora immediately after the sacrifice;

The selfsame gods that armed the Queen of Troy
With opportunity of sharp revenge
Upon the Thracian tyrant in his tent
May favour Tamora, the Queen of Goths
(When Goths were Goths and Tamora was Queen),
To quit the bloody wrongs upon her foes.

1.1.136-141

This ultimately leads to Tamora ordering her sons to rape Lavinia, which in turn leads directly to Titus killing and then cooking Chiron and Demetrius, his eventual murder of both Lavinia and Tamora, his own death at the hands of Saturninus, and Saturninus' death at the hands of Lucius. Revenge runs through the play from beginning to end; Coppélia Kahn argues that the basic trajectory of the plot is "Titus' transformation from Roman hero to revenge hero."

After the sacrifice of Alarbus, when Saturninus has taken Tamora as his bride, she asks him to pardon Titus for what Saturninus sees as dishonourable conduct. Incredulous, Saturninus asks, "What, madam, be dishonoured openly,/And basely put it up without revenge" (1.1.432–433); any infraction or insult must be reciprocated. Later, Aaron tells Tamora that he too is preoccupied with revenge; "Blood and revenge are hammering in my head" (2.3.39). Ordering her sons to rape Lavinia, Tamora says "This vengeance on me had they executed./Revenge it, as you love your mother's life" (2.3.114–115). Then, prior to the rape, Tamora responds to Lavinia's pleas for mercy by outlining how important her revenge is, only Lavinia's pain can satiate it;

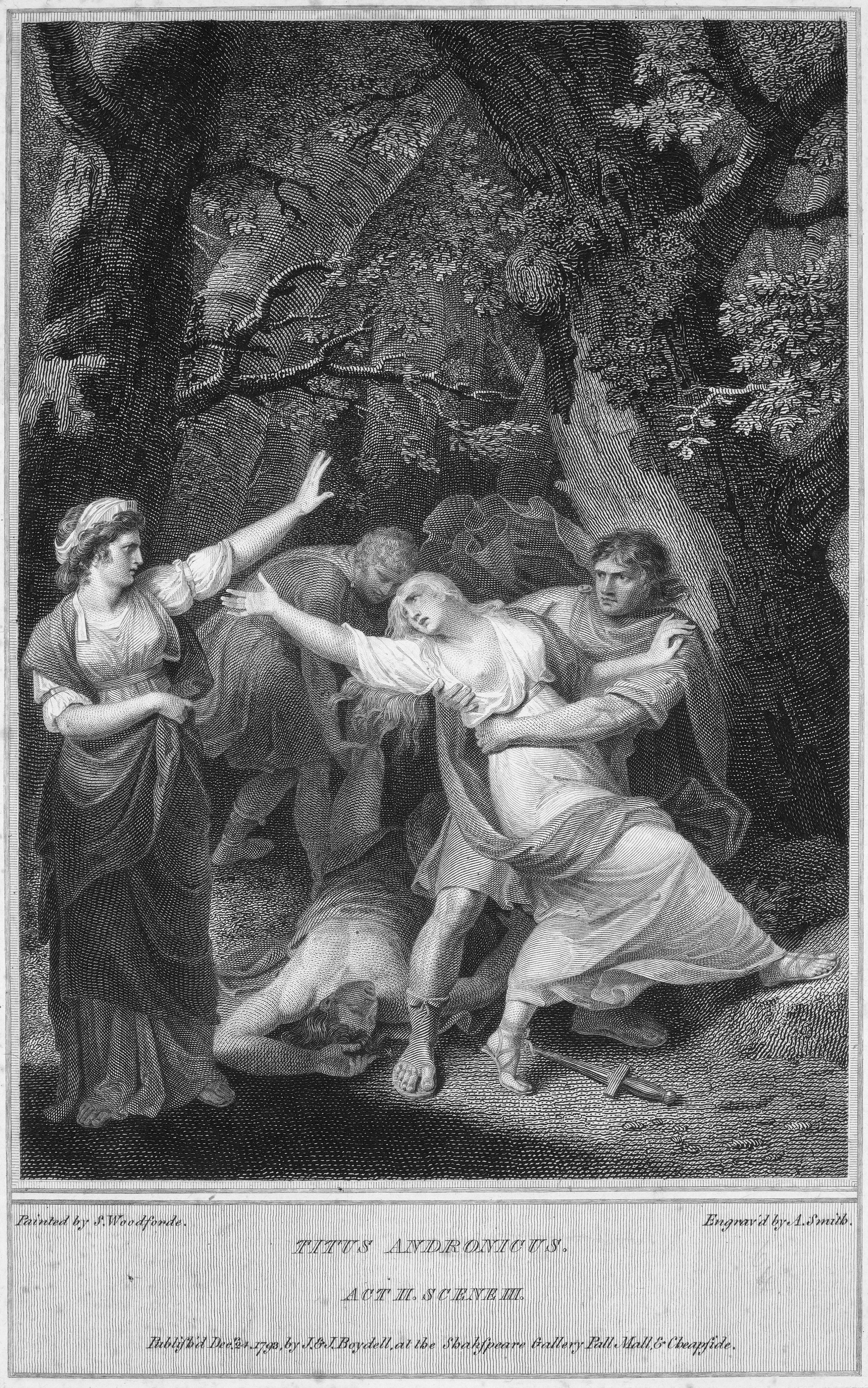
Tamora concerned only with revenge; Samuel Woodforde illustration, engraved by Anker Smith (1793)

Hadst thou in person ne'er offended me,
Even for [Alarbus'] sake am I pitiless.
Remember, boys, I poured forth tears in vain
To save your brother from the sacrifice,
But fierce Andronicus would not relent.
Therefore away with her, and use her as you will;
The worse of her, the better loved of me.

2.3.161-167

As Chiron and Demetrius drag Lavinia into the forest, Tamora vows "Ne'er let my heart know merry cheer indeed/Till all the Andronici be made away" (2.3.187–188). Tamora will literally not be happy until she has avenged herself on the whole family.

Later in the play, Titus makes a similar avowal. After the deaths of Martius and Quintus, he asks, "Which way shall I find Revenge's cave?/For these two heads do seem to speak to me,/And threat me I shall never come to bliss/Till all these mischiefs be returned again" (3.1.269–272). As with Tamora, he is here saying that his primary raison d'être has become to seek revenge. Similarly, prior to Lucius' departure to the Goths, he declares;

If Lucius live he will requite your wrongs,
And make proud Saturnine and his empress
Beg at the gates like Tarquin and his queen.
Now will I to the Goths and raise a power,
To be revenged on Rome and Saturnine.

3.1.295-299

Immediately after Lucius' departure, Titus prepares a meal, but warns Marcus "Look you eat no more/Than will preserve just so much strength in us/As will revenge these bitter woes of ours" (3.2.1–3). Later, Titus comes to feel that even God has become involved in his desire for revenge; "Here display at last/What God will have discovered for revenge" (4.1.73). Then, upon the discovery of who raped Lavinia, he declares

And swear with me, as, with the woeful fere
And father of that chaste dishonoured dame,
Lord Junius Brutus sware for Lucrece' rape,
That we will prosecute by good advice,
Mortal revenge upon these traitorous Goths,
And see their blood, or die with this reproach.

4.1.88-93

Young Lucius also becomes involved in a desire for revenge;

BOY
I say, my lord, that if I were a man,
Their mother's bedchamber should not be safe,
For these base bondmen to the yoke of Rome.

TITUS
Ah, that's my boy! Thy father had full oft
For his ungrateful country done the like.

BOY
And, uncle, so will I an if I live.

4.1.106-111

Later, Marcus urges Publius to "Join with the Goths, and with revengeful war/Take wreak on Rome for this ingratitude,/And vengeance on the traitor Saturnine" (4.3.32–34).

The most obvious manifestation of revenge is when it literally enters the play, with Tamora attempting to dupe the apparently insane Titus; "I will encounter with Andronicus,/And say I am Revenge, sent from below/To join with him and right his heinous wrongs" (5.2.2–4). She then introduces herself as

I am Revenge, sent from th’infernal kingdom
To ease the gnawing vulture of thy mind
By working wreakful vengeance on thy foes.

5.2.32-35

Titus then instructs Revenge that if she encounter Tamora and her sons "I pray thee, do on them some violent death;/They have been violent to me and mine" (5.2.108–109).

Jonathan Bate sees this scene as especially important in the treatment of revenge. On how Titus manipulates the scene and turns the tables, Bate comments "the vehicle of Tamora's revenge against Titus for the death of Alarbus has become the vehicle of Titus' revenge against Tamora for the rape of Lavinia and the deaths of Bassianus, Quintus and Martius." He also finds great significance in the physical entry of Revenge into the play; "by representing Revenge as a character's device rather than a 'reality' outside the action, [Shakespeare] suggests that retribution is a matter of human, not divine will."

== Violence and the audience ==
One of the main reasons that Titus has traditionally been derided is the amount of on-stage violence. The play is saturated with violence from its opening scene, and violence touches virtually every character; Alarbus is burned alive and has his arms chopped off; Titus stabs his own son to death; Bassianus is murdered and thrown into a pit; Lavinia is brutally raped (and has her hands cut off and her tongue cut out); Martius and Quintus are decapitated; a nurse and a midwife are stabbed to death by Aaron; an innocent clown is executed for no apparent reason; Titus kills Chiron and Demetrius and cooks them in a pie, which he then feeds to their mother. Then, in the final scene, in the space of a few lines, Titus kills in succession Lavinia and Tamora, and is then immediately killed by Saturninus, who is in turn immediately killed by Lucius. Aaron is then buried up to his neck and left to starve to death in the open air and Tamora's body is thrown to the wild beasts outside the city. As S. Clark Hulse points out, "it has 14 killings, 9 of them on stage, 6 severed members, 1 rape (or 2 or 3 depending on how you count), 1 live burial, 1 case of insanity, and 1 of cannibalism – an average of 5.2 atrocities per act, or one for every 97 lines."

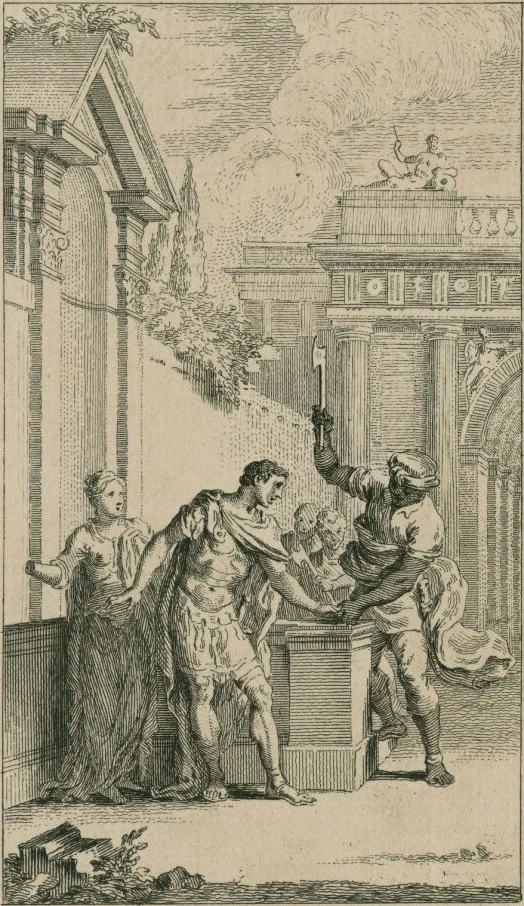
An example of the violence in the play – Aaron cuts off Titus' hand whilst the already handless Lavinia looks on; Gravelot illustration, engraved by Gerard Van der Gucht (1740)

J. Dover Wilson, following John Addington Symonds, defines the play as part of a subgenre called "Tragedy of Blood", directly influenced by Seneca, and places it alongside such plays as Thomas Sackville and Thomas Norton's Gorboduc, (c.1561), Thomas Hughes' The Misfortunes of Arthur (1588), Thomas Kyd's The Spanish Tragedy (c.1588), Christopher Marlowe's The Jew of Malta (1590), Henry Chettle's The Tragedy of Hoffman (1602) and the anonymous Alphonsus, Emperor of Germany (1654). As such, a common theory as to why the play is so violent is that Shakespeare was trying to outdo his predecessors, who catered to the blood-thirsty tastes of the Elizabethan groundlings (Alan C. Dessen refers to Titus as "the most 'Elizabethan' of Shakespeare's plays"). In Thomas Preston's Cambyses (1569), for example, a character is brutally flagellated on stage, and various props and theatrical effects are used to simulate dismemberment and several instances of decapitation. In Kyd's The Spanish Tragedy, there are several graphic murders, and the protagonist bites out his own tongue. Dover Wilson thus suggests that Shakespeare was giving the audience what it wanted, but by giving it to them in such excessive quantities, he was in effect, mocking them, as he watched them "gaping ever wider to swallow more as he tossed them bigger and bigger gobbets of sob-stuff and raw beef-stake."

However, many twentieth century critics, working with new research into Elizabethan culture, have suggested that the society may not have been as blood-thirsty as is often assumed, and as such, Shakespeare could not have been catering to the audience's predilections for violence. According to Ann Jennalie Cook for example, not all of Shakespeare's audience would have been groundlings, the intelligentsia would also have made up an important part of the box office; "the social and economic realities of Renaissance London decreed an audience more privileged than plebeian." With this in mind then, Eugene M. Waith makes the suggestion that Shakespeare was attempting to appeal to both levels of his audience, groundlings and intelligentsia; he embraced the traditions of violence so as to ensure high box office, but the style of the play and the numerous classical allusions suggest he was writing with an educated audience in mind. Similarly, Sylvan Barnet argues, "Although the groundlings probably were delighted, the author must have felt he was creating a drama that would appeal also to the cultivated, who knew Seneca and Ovid." The vast range of mythological and classical references have often been pointed to as evidence of an educated target audience; references include Priam, the Styx, Scythia, Hecuba, Polymnestor, Titan, Phoebe, Hymenaeus, Ajax, Laertes, Odysseus, Olympus, Prometheus, Semiramis, Vulcan, Lucrece, Aeneas, Dido, Venus, Saturn, Philomel, Dian, Acteon, Jove, Pyramus, the Cocytus, Tereus, Cerberus, Orpheus, Tarquin, Cornelia, Apollo, Pallas, Mercury, Hector, Enceladus, Typhon, Alcides, Mars, Astraea, Pluto, Cyclops, Verginia and Sinon.

With this in mind, some critics suggest that the violence in the play is much more than violence for violence's sake, and is instead a fundamental part of the thematic whole. For example, Brian Vickers argues that critics commonly express "an aesthetico-ethical dislike for the violence" because they fail to grasp that "any attentive and unprejudiced reading of the play will show that the violence is in no way gratuitous but part of a closely organised depiction of several cycles of harm and counter-harm." Similarly, for Waith, the violence "represents the political and moral degradation of Rome when Saturninus becomes Emperor of Rome. It also plays a major part in the presentation of the hero's metamorphosis into a cruel revenger. While no artistic device can be called inevitable, one can say with some assurance that Shakespeare's use of violence in Titus Andronicus is far from gratuitous. It is an integral part of his dramatic technique."

Working along the same lines, Jonathan Bate argues that Shakespeare, not content with presenting a play in which violence is a theme, may also have been making his audience wonder about the nature of the violence before them, and thus the play acquires a sense of social critique; "Would playgoers have drawn comparisons between the revenger's ritualised violence and the ritualised violence that they were familiar with in real life?" Thus, "Shakespeare is interrogating Rome, asking what kind of an example it provides for Elizabethan England." Trevor Nunn, who directed an RSC production in 1972, sees the play in a similar light, arguing that the violence raises profound questions for an Elizabethan audience; "thinking about Rome was the only way an Elizabethan had of thinking about civilisation" and as such "if Roman power, law and virtue could fail in the end, what absolutes could men look to under heaven?" In this sense, the play depicts "the Elizabethan nightmare, for even golden ages come to an end in blood, torture and barbarism, and even Rome, the greatest civilisation the world had known, can fall, dragging mankind with it into the darkness."

Another director who has addressed this issue is Gale Edwards, who directed a Shakespeare Theatre Company production in 2007. In her notes, Edwards argues

this is a story, not about gratuitous violence, but about the results and repercussions of violence on society, on family and on the human psyche. It is a story about great pain and suffering, which is the inevitable result of any act of revenge. It deals with our capacity for terrible cruelty and our vulnerability as human beings. It deals with our nobility, our endurance and our definition of ourselves. Our very identity. The lopping off of limbs, in this reading of the play, becomes a powerful metaphor for the dismembership of the state, the destruction of our moral codes and the disintegration of our very humanity.

Similarly, Peter Brook, when explaining why he thought his 1955 RSC production had been so successful, argues that the play is "about the most modern of emotions – about violence, hatred, cruelty, pain."

== Breakdown of political order ==
Another prominent theme in the play is political order, both its collapse and the desire to create a new order. Jacques Berthoud argues that one of the main ideas of the play is "an impression of disintegrating control." Oftentimes, political order is supplanted by total chaos, and the characters can only yearn for a time when order will again reign supreme. As Eugene M. Waith argues of the highly formal nature of the opening scene, "the ceremonies of triumph, sacrifice, burial and election immediately establish the solemnity of public occasions on which an ideal political order is affirmed and individuals are valued to the extent that they support it. The repeated interruptions of the ceremonies suggest the fragility of that order while the mention of Titus' dead sons and the deaths of Alarbus and Mutius emphasise the terrible cost of maintaining it." The political order that so many characters yearn for and would die to protect is presented as far from stable.

The demise of order is represented by Titus himself; the once proud general who stood for everything that was good and honourable in Rome, but is now a madman lying on the road and preaching to the dirt (3.1.23–47);

Titus, noble, patriotic, but flawed by cruelty and an abysmal lack of political judgement, is a mirror of Rome in decline. He, too, has spent his life in repelling barbarism, but now his weariness, old age, and lack of mental agility in coming to terms with new problems, reflect the lack of real energy and capacity of Rome in dealing with the various crises that beset it in its declining years. His subscription to the unhistorical cruelty of making sacrifice of prisoners in the city streets is a symptom of the coarsening of Roman life and values. In the figure of Rome's "best champion," therefore, we see Shakespeare's initial exploration in microcosmic form of the painful and tragic collapse of a great civilization.

The breakdown of order is also emphasised time and again throughout the play in a more literal sense. For example, Marcus alludes to the lack of leadership in Rome because of the death of the old Emperor, and thus asks Titus "Help to set a head on headless Rome" (1.1.186). Due to the appointment of Saturninus however, the breakdown of order accelerates; his wife is having an affair and bent only on revenge upon the Andronici, an invasion army is formed, Saturninus loses the support of the people, and his greatest general seemingly goes mad. The collapse of political order reaches an ironic apotheosis in the final scene, with the breakdown of all order as four murders are committed at a royal banquet in quick succession; Titus kills Lavinia, then Tamora, Saturninus kills Titus, and Lucius kills Saturninus. Immediately upon the restoration of harmony, however, Marcus urges a return to the Rome of old, "O, let me teach you how to knit again/This scattered corn into one mutual sheaf" (5.3.69–70), an order which Lucius subsequently promises to restore; "May I govern so,/To Rome's harms and wipe away her woe" (5.3.146–147). Thus the play ends with a promise of restored order, not with the actual restoration itself.

== Civilisation vs. Barbarism ==
Another theme mentioned numerous times throughout the play is the conflict between civilisation and barbarism. For many of the characters, Rome is the epitome of a civilised society, with everything outside Rome seen as barbarous. This concept is introduced when Marcus intervenes in the debate between Bassianus and Saturninus, which is threatening to boil over into violence;

Let us entreat, by honour of [Titus'] name
Whom worthily you would have now succeed,
And in the Capitol and senate's right,
Whom you pretend to honour and adore,
That you withdraw you and abate your strength,
Dismiss your followers, and, as suitors should,
Plead your deserts in peace and humbleness.

1.1.39-45

Marcus feels that, as a civilised country, this is how Rome should act. He is also the great champion of civility when pleading with Titus to let Mutius be buried in the family tomb;

Suffer thy brother Marcus to inter
His noble nephew here in virtue's nest,
That died in honour and Lavinia's cause.
Thou art a Roman; be not barbarous:
The Greeks upon advise did bury Ajax,
That slew himself; and wise Laertes' son
Did graciously plead for his funerals;
Let not young Mutius then that was thy joy,
Be barred his entrance here.

1.1.377-384

However, not all of the characters agree with the simple equation that Rome is civilised and everything else barbaric. When Titus refuses to spare the life of Alarbus, for example;

TAMORA
O cruel, irreligious piety!

CHIRON
Was never Scythia half so barbarous.

DEMETRIUS
Oppose not Scythia to ambitious Rome.

1.1.130-132

Aaron too sees Roman civility as laughable, but in a different way to Chiron and Demetrius; "I urge thy oath; for that I know/An idiot holds his bauble for a god,/And keeps the oath which by that god he swears." (5.1.78–80). Here, Aaron sees civilisation as nothing more than something foolish, peopled by idiots who keep their word. He returns to this theme in his final speech, glorying in his embracement of barbarism;

Ah, why should wrath be mute, and fury dumb?
I am no baby, I, that with base prayers
I should repent the evils I have done;
Ten thousand worse, than ever yet I did
Would I perform, if I might have my will.
If one good deed in all my life I did,
I do repent it from my very soul.

5.3.183-189

However, the play itself is ambiguous in its depiction of civilised characters and barbaric ones. For example, it ends with the apparently civilised Romans joining forces with the apparently barbarous Goths. However, according to both Jonathan Bate and Jacques Berthoud, the Goths at the end of the play are not the same Goths who had been led by Tamora. Bate believes the play "begins with a Roman stigmatisation of the Goths as barbarians, but modulates towards a very different view. If the Second Goth is a barbarian, what is he doing gazing "upon a ruinous monastery"? For the Elizabethans, history had lessons to teach the present, so this anachronism is purposeful." Bate devises a thesis which suggests that the Goths who appear earlier in the play are 'evil' and those who follow Lucius are 'good'. Bate also argues that "at one level, the Goths at the end of the play are invading Rome because they wish to take revenge on their Queen Tamora for selling out and marrying Saturninus. But at the same time, they and Lucius share a language of faithful friendship, worthiness, honour and valour. They serve as a rebuke to the decadence into which Rome has fallen. This is of a piece with the play's persistent dissolution of the binary opposition which associates Rome and the city with virtue, the Goths and the woods with barbarism."

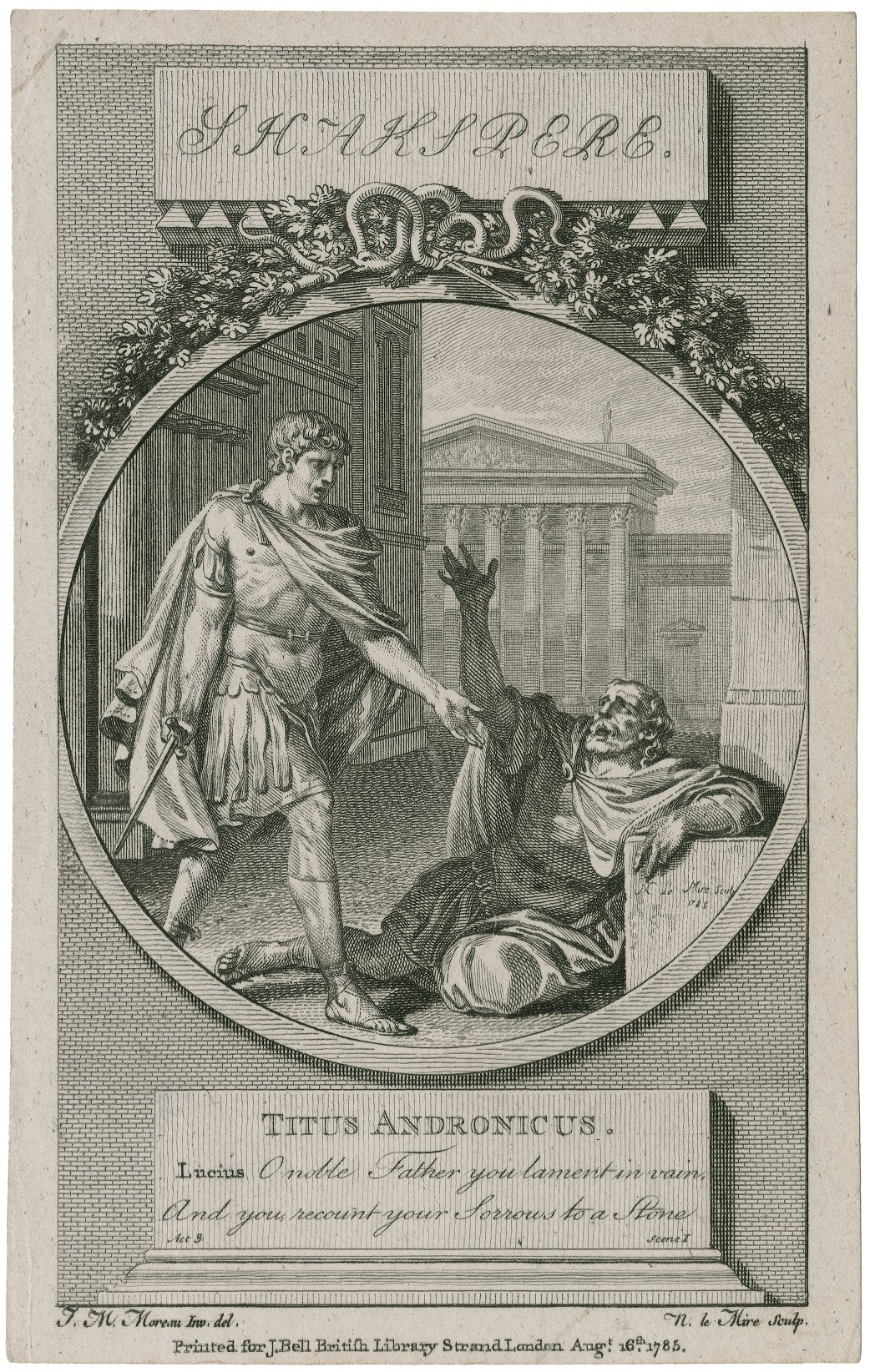
As Lucius tells Titus the tribunes are no longer listening to him, Titus begins to realise that the line between civilisation and barbarism is narrower than he thought; Jean-Michel Moreau illustration, engraved by N. le Mire (1785)

Jacques Berthoud argues that the Goths at the end of the play are Germanic whereas Tamora is not a Germanic name, but is instead Asiatic, thus the Goths at the end of the play (the Germanic Goths) are not the Goths ruled over by Tamora (the barbaric Goths). Speaking of Tamora's Goths, Berthoud argues "what these Goths have revealed about themselves is not that they are possessed by Satanic powers, but that they are, as it were, socially moronic. The Romans are Romans by virtue of the fact that they have internalised Rome; at an elementary level the Germanic Goths, too, are shown to have assimilated the qualities of a real, if unsophisticated culture. In contrast, these 'barbaric' Goths do not seem to have internalised anything ... they remain morally incomplete. It is for this reason that they regard the massively integrated Andronici as their pre-ordained foes." On the other hand, Anthony Brian Taylor reads the end of the play as meaning that Rome has simply embraced barbarism, and "what motivates the Goths who have allied themselves to Lucius, is no sudden burst of uncharacteristic altruism but the prospect of revenge on Rome."

However, the question has been asked by many critics; is the Rome of Titus Andronicus really civilised itself? According to Robert Miola, it is not; "It devours its children – figuratively by consigning them to the gaping maw of the Andronici tomb, and literally by serving them in the bloody banquet at the play's end." One of the inherent ironies of the play is the contradiction between Titus' civilised veneer when burying his sons, and the unfeeling cruelty he shows to Tamora regarding her own son. This is emphasised in his failure to adhere to his own doctrine that "Sweet mercy is nobility's true badge" (1.1.119). The simplistic distinction between the Romans as civilised and the Goths as barbarous is thus complicated. Markus Marti argues that the apparent contradiction in Titus, and in Rome at large, has more important ramifications beyond character psychology;

Behind a thin layer of cultural gloss lurks Mr Hyde, or rather, our cultural achievements are a superstructure which consists of signifiers heaped upon signifiers of signifiers, but which is ultimately grounded on a very ugly material base which we try to hide, to forget, to dispel and ignore. Rome is the right setting to show this, because this is the place where our culture started in the eyes of an Elizabethan audience, and it is the place where it reached its first peak, in literature, in law, in the building of an empire, in the Pax Romana, in Christianity. But Rome was founded on murder and rape – and if the cultural achievements of humanity – society, law, language, literature – are followed back to their roots, if words are made flesh again, all our cultural achievements turn out to be based on origins which we now consider inhuman and beastly: on sacrifices, on rape and murder, on revenge, on cannibalism.

Similarly, Jonathan Bate argues that the play depicts the Roman conversion from civility to barbarism;

The city prided itself on not being barbaric: the word "civilised" comes from "civilis", which means "of citizens, of the city", and Rome was the city. The religious rituals of a civilised culture, it was believed, involved animal rather than human sacrifice. When Lucius demands that the shadows be appeased through the lopping of the limbs of "the proudest prisoner of the Goths" and the consuming of his flesh in the fire, barbarism has entered the city. The first of the play's many reversals of expected linguistic and behavioural codes takes place, and the supposedly barbaric queen of Goths speaks a Roman language of valour, patriotism, piety, mercy and nobility, whereas the Roman warriors go about their ritual killing.

Anthony Brian Taylor makes a similar argument concerning the character of Lucius, who he sees as "a deeply flawed Roman. Stolid, unimaginative, and soldierly, it never dawns on him that his readiness to commit unspeakable atrocities on man, woman, and child, is utterly barbaric and totally irreconcilable with the civilised values on which his life is centred. Moreover, in being a deeply flawed Roman, Lucius is his father's son, and as such, a fascinating extension of the play's central theme."

Darragh Greene makes the point that it is Lucius and Marcus' mastery of rhetoric, the art of manipulating language, that undermines naive ideals of civilised order: "'Have we done aught amiss?' (5.3.126) asks Marcus, Tribune and so putative guardian and guarantor of the socio-moral order. Once the question is formulated, in an age of rhetoric that recognizes language is the tool for shaping perception, for making the world, the answer will be whatever Marcus or Lucius wish it to be for their own purposes."

== Race and the Other ==
The theme of race and the other is introduced in Titus Andronicus through the character of Aaron the Moor. Aaron the Moor from Titus Andronicus is one of Shakespeare's three named black characters in his entire canon of work. Aaron is the lover to Tamora, the Queen of the Goths, who advises her and aligns himself with her with the hopes of elevating himself. He is the orchestrator behind much of the violence in Titus Andronicus, convincing Tamora's sons, Chiron and Demetrius, to kill Bassianus and rape Lavinia in the woods, and engineers the situation such that Titus' sons, Quintus and Martius, are found culpable for the murder, resulting in their deaths as well.

As the only named black character in Titus Andronicus, Aaron is frequently 'othered' by the white and aristocratic characters of the cast. Aaron introduces himself as ambitious to make it to the top of the government with Tamora, saying to himself:

Then, Aaron, arm thy heart and fit thy thoughts

To mount aloft with thy imperial mistress,...

I will be bright and shine in pearl and gold

To wait upon this new-made empress.

To wait, said I? To wanton with this queen...

2.1.12-21

Aaron expresses his desire to gain power and to use Tamora to get power. Shakespeare characterizes Aaron as a character that is the villain and fully claims the villain role, shown through his words on multiple occasions. This position as villain is often closely associated with references to his blackness. Of his plot for the rape of Lavinia he says,

Vengeance is in my heart, death in my hand,

Blood and revenge are hammering in my head

2.3.38-39

Aaron, without directly citing his race as a reason, seems to know that he is damned, telling Tamora, "[My soul] never hopes more heaven than rests in thee" (2.3.41). After he says this to Tamora, Bassianus catches Aaron and Tamora in the woods together and insults Aaron's blackness and Tamora for affiliating herself with a black person saying,

Believe me, queen, your swarthy Cimmerian

Doth make your honor of his body's hue,

Spotted, detested, and abominable

2.3.73-75

Scholar Phyllis N. Braxton writes of Aaron's knowledge of his race as reason for damnation, "Aaron is fully cognizant of the fact that he is vilified because of his ethnicity and thus is predetermined to be Satan's ally." Braxton also notes that to medieval and Elizabethan audiences, the devil was frequently represented as black, and therefore closely affiliated with the black skin color. Black skin was associated with black bile from the practice of humorism as being responsible for melancholy in the body.

The other characters similarly show a disdain for Aaron and his blackness, distinguishing him from themselves as lesser for his race. They refer to him as "barbarous Moor" (2.3.78), "raven-colored love" (2.3.83), "hellish dog" (4.2.81), "incarnate devil" (5.1.40), "detestable villain" (5.1.95), "ravenous tiger, accursed devil" (5.3.5), and "irreligious Moor" (5.3.120) throughout the course of the play.

In addition to insulting Aaron, the characters dehumanize him and his child for their blackness. When Tamora and Aaron's child is born, the maid brings him the child and calls the baby "A joyless, dismal, black, and sorrowful issue!" (4.2.69).

Additionally, Titus begins to admonish Marcus for killing an innocent fly, but then Marcus claims the fly reminded him of Aaron:

MARCUS

It was a black, ill-favored fly,

Like to the Empress' Moor. Therefore I killed him.

TITUS

O, O, O!

Then pardon me for reprehending thee,

For thou hast done a charitable deed

3.2.67-71

Scholar Margaux Deroux writes that Aaron's character demonstrates an Early Modern attitude towards blackness as representing "all that must expelled, contained, or dominated," but also claims that Aaron in some ways subverts that framework. This subversion mainly comes from the moments when Aaron finds out that Tamora's son is his. He is uncharacteristically gentle to his infant son, who the maid and Tamora's other sons are disgusted by due to his black skin.

Aaron is willing to die for his son, which is contrasted directly with Titus, who killed his own son in the beginning of the novel, showing that Aaron is capable of both love and sacrifice. He responds to the criticism of the maid and Tamora's sons asking, "Is black so base a hue?" (4.2.74). Aaron challenges the association of blackness with violence for his son despite having claimed it for himself. Deroux argues that the decision to have Aaron contradict so strongly the ethics on race constructed throughout the play suggests an acknowledgment of race as a construct.
