= Angus Macfadyen =

Scottish actor (born 1963)

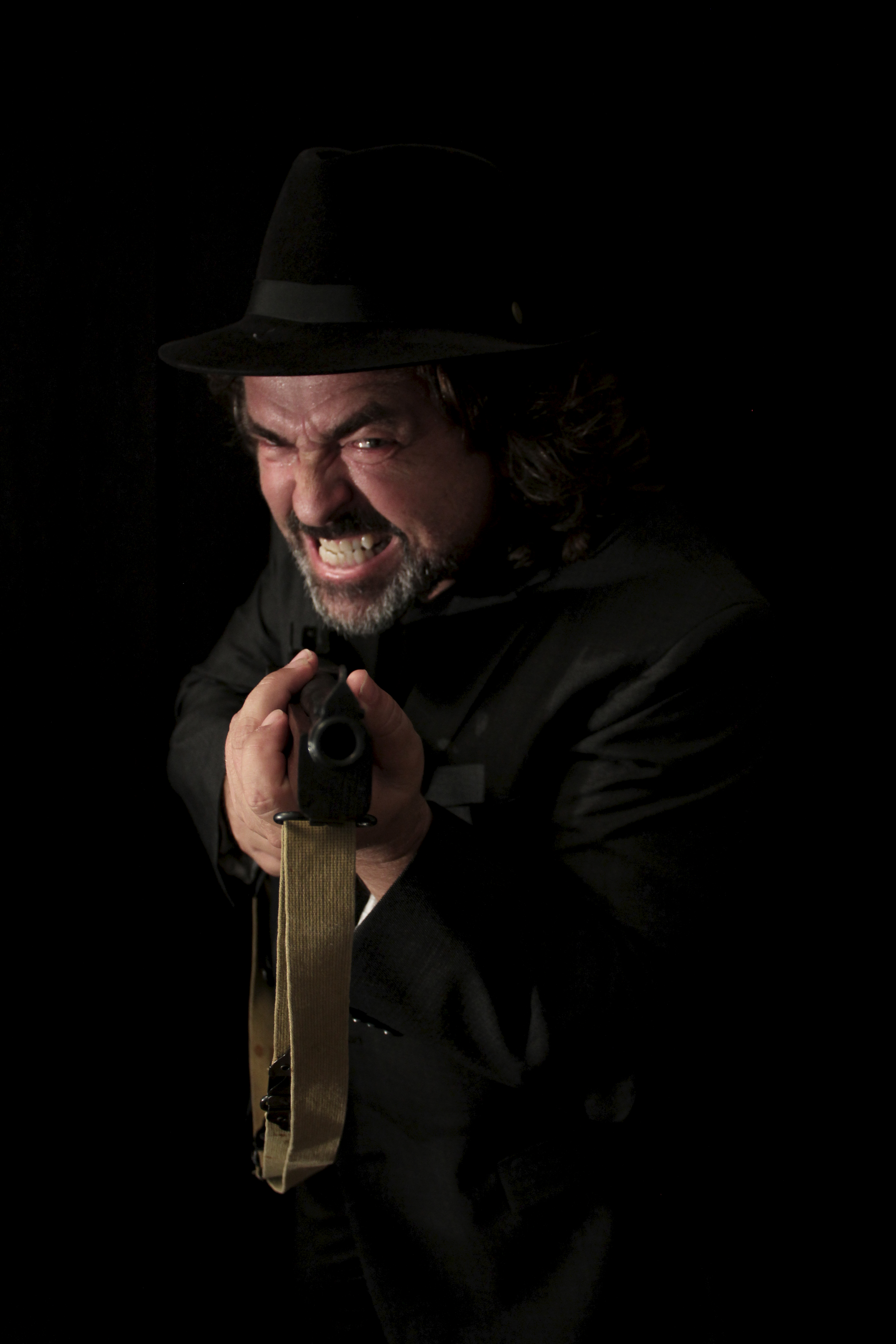
- Macfadyen in the film Timeless
- Born: September 21, 1963 (age 63)
- Education: University of Edinburgh; Central School of Speech and Drama
- Occupation: Actor
- Years active: 1991–present
- Website: angusmacfadyen.com

Angus Macfadyen (born September 21, 1963) is a Scottish actor. His roles include Robert the Bruce, both in Braveheart and Robert the Bruce, Komodo in Warriors of Virtue, Vice-Counsel Dupont in Equilibrium, Jeff Denlon in the Saw franchise, Robert Rogers in the AMC historical drama Turn: Washington's Spies, McCreedy in Cameron Crowe's We Bought a Zoo, and biologist James Murray in The Lost City of Z. He has made appearances on several television series such as Californication, Criminal Minds, Chuck, and Superman & Lois.

== Early life ==
Macfadyen was brought up in the Philippines, Africa, Singapore and France. His father was a doctor in the World Health Organization. Macfadyen attended the University of Edinburgh and the Central School of Speech and Drama in London.

== Career ==
=== 1990s ===
Macfadyen's first role was Philip in the film made for television The Lost Language of Cranes (1991). He portrayed a young man who must tell his parents that he is gay. Playing the role of his father was fellow Scottish actor Brian Cox. Macfadyen then acted in five episodes of Soldier Soldier before appearing in the television film 15: The Life and Death of Philip Knight (1993) and also on the television series Takin' Over the Asylum (1994) about a salesman who runs a radio station in a mental institution. That role led to his role as Robert the Bruce in Mel Gibson's film Braveheart (1995). In 1995 he also portrayed Richard Burton in the TV miniseries Liz: The Elizabeth Taylor Story.

After Braveheart won Best Picture at the Academy Awards, Macfadyen acted in the independent film Nevada (1997), before giving the most over-the-top performance of his career in the action/fantasy Warriors of Virtue (1997). He also co-starred alongside Don Cheadle and Ray Liotta when he played Peter Lawford in the HBO film The Rat Pack (1998).

Macfadyen played Orson Welles in Tim Robbins's third directorial film Cradle Will Rock (1999). Although the film received a nomination for the Palme d'Or at Cannes, it was a financial flop. Macfadyen next made the Shakespearan film Titus (1999), alongside Anthony Hopkins, where he played Lucius, eldest son of Titus Andronicus. Directed by Julie Taymor, the film was a critical triumph but with mediocre box office results.

=== 2000s ===
After the noir film Second Skin (2000), Macfadyen acted in a number of poorly received films. One such film was the action film Styx (2001) which starred Peter Weller. A year later, he acted in the comedy film Divine Secrets of the Ya-Ya Sisterhood (2002) alongside a number of famous names: Sandra Bullock, Ellen Burstyn, Maggie Smith and Ashley Judd. That same year, Macfadyen took the role of Vice-Counsel Dupont in Equilibrium (also 2002). The film, also starring Christian Bale, Sean Bean, Taye Diggs and Emily Watson, is set in the future, where a fascist regime forbids all emotions.

Macfadyen acted as Marcus Crassus in a TV mini-series of Spartacus (2004), and the character of Bill in The Pleasure Drivers (2005).

In 2006, he was the lead in the dramatic film The Virgin of Juarez (2006). He then starred in Kevin Connor's mini-series Blackbeard, it co-stars Richard Chamberlain, Jessica Chastain, Mark Umbers, Stacy Keach, David Winters, and Rachel Ward. It's about pirate Blackbeard (Macfadyen), who wreaks havoc on the high-seas looking for Captain Kidd's treasure. His dark presence causes controversy in the local port town of New Providence, especially among Gov. Charles Eden (Chamberlain) and his adopted daughter Charlotte (Chastain), who is being wooed by Lt. Robert Maynard (Umbers).

His next big role was that of Jeff Denlon in Saw III (also 2006). Jeff is a man obsessed with revenge, and he is led into a series of traps that test his ability to forgive. The film was a smash hit for its $10 million budget, earning almost $200 million worldwide. Macfadyen then co-starred in the box office bomb Redline and Saw IV (both 2007), which was also a box office success.

Macfadyen continued making films, starring as the outlaw Will Tunney in his western film Shadowheart (2009). He has appeared on television on the series Killer Wave (2007) and Californication (2008) He has also acted in the mystery film San Saba (2008) and the thriller film Clean Break (aka, Unnatural Causes, 2008).

=== 2010s ===
Macfadyen has appeared in two thrillers: Pound of Flesh (2010) alongside Malcolm McDowell, which revolves around a corrupt college professor, and the crime thriller Shadows of the White Nights (aka, Assassins Run, 2013) alongside Christian Slater. He starred as Lucas Blackstone in the Christian film Taken by Grace (also 2013). Additionally, Macfadyen guest-starred in an episode of USA Network's television series Psych, the Cameron Crowe feature film We Bought a Zoo (2011) starring Matt Damon, and the final season of Chuck as villain Nicholas Quinn. In 2012, he played Falstaff in H4, a modernized Shakespeare adaptation produced by Harry Lennix.

Macfadyen also starred as Robert Rogers in AMC's historical drama series Turn: Washington's Spies (2014–17), and Allan Pinkerton on the first-run syndicated series The Pinkertons (2014–15). Macbeth: Unhinged (2016) is a modernised feature-length film adapted from the Shakespearean play in which he stars and directs. He appeared opposite Charlie Hunnam and Robert Pattinson as biologist James Murray in the 2016 biographical drama The Lost City of Z.

In 2021, Macfadyen was cast as Jor-El in Superman & Lois.

== Filmography ==
=== Film ===
Year	Title	Role	Notes
1995	Braveheart	Robert the Bruce	
1997	Nevada	West	
1997	Warriors of Virtue	Komodo	
1997	Snide and Prejudice	Adolf Hitler / Michael Davidson	
1997	Still Breathing	Philip	
1998	Joseph's Gift	Carl	
1998	The Brylcreem Boys	Rudolph Von Stegenbek	
1998	Lani Loa – The Passage	Turner	
1999	Façade	Frederic Colbert	
1999	Titus	Lucius	
1999	Cradle Will Rock	Orson Welles	
2002	Divine Secrets of the Ya-Ya Sisterhood	Connor McGill	
2002	Equilibrium	Vice-Counsel DuPont	
2005	Shooting Gallery	Tenderloin Tony	Direct-to-video
2006	Fatwa	Bobby	
2006	The Pleasure Drivers	Bill	
2006	Saw III	Jeff Denlon	
2006	.45	Al "Big Al"	
2007	Redline	Michael D'Orazio	
2007	Saw IV	Jeff Denlon	Cameo
2008	Impulse	Jonathan Dennison, Simon Philips	
2008	Clean Break	Matt McKay	
2011	We Bought a Zoo	Peter MacCready	
2012	H4	Falstaff	
2013	Copperhead	Jee Hagadorn	
2013	Sugar	Uncle Gene	
2016	Timeless	Dr. Meier	
2017	The Lost City of Z	James Murray	
2018	Alive	Caretaker / The Man	
2018	F.R.E.D.I.	Grant	
2019	3022	Richard Valin	
2019	Robert the Bruce	Robert the Bruce	Also producer and screenwriter
2020	Steel Rain 2: Summit	Willis Chatman Smoot	
2024	Horizon: An American Saga – Chapter 1	Desmarais	
2026	The Canvas	NIck	

=== Television ===
Year	Title	Role	Notes
1991	The Lost Language of Cranes	Philip	Television film
1992	Soldier Soldier	Lieutenant Alex Pereira	Recurring role, 5 episodes
1994	Screen One	Dexter	1 episode
1994	Takin' Over the Asylum	Fergus	Miniseries, 4 episodes
1995	Liz: The Elizabeth Taylor Story	Richard Burton	Television film
1998	The Rat Pack	Peter Lawford	Television film
2000	Jason and the Argonauts	Zeus	Miniseries, 2 episodes
2003	Miracles	Alva Keel	Main role, 13 episodes
2004	Spartacus	Marcus Crassus	Television film
2004	Five Days to Midnight	Roy Bremmer	Miniseries, 5 episodes
2005	Tilt	Roy McEntyre	1 episode
2005–2006	Alias	Joseph Erhmann	3 episodes
2006	Blackbeard	Blackbeard	Miniseries, 3 episodes
2007	Killer Wave	John McAdams	Miniseries, 2 episodes
2008	Eleventh Hour	Jason Cooper	1 episode
2008	Californication	Julian	Recurring role, 6 episodes
2010	Lie to Me	Jimmy Doyle	Episode "Sweet Sixteen"
2010	Psych	Logan Paget	1 episode, "Shawn and Gus in Drag (Racing)"
2011	Criminal Minds	Sean McAllister	2 episodes
2012	Chuck	Nicholas Quinn	4 episodes
2013	Republic of Doyle	Gerald Byrne	1 episode
2014–2017	Turn: Washington's Spies	Robert Rogers	Main role, 31 episodes
2014–2015	The Pinkertons	Allan Pinkerton	Main role, 22 episodes
2019	Strange Angel	Aleister Crowley	Recurring role, 5 episodes
2021	Superman & Lois	Jor-El	Recurring role; 5 episodes
2023	Outlander	Brigadier General Simon Fraser	Recurring role, 3 episodes
