= Boys Abducted =

- Cover of the 2025 Duke University Press edition
- Author: Abdulhamit Arvas
- Language: English
- Publisher: Duke University Press
- Publication date: 2025
- Pages: 322

Boys Abducted: The Homoerotics of Empire and Race in Early Modernity is a 2025 queer history book by University of Pennsylvania English professor Abdulhamit Arvas. It won the 2026 Phyllis Goodhart Gordan book award Best Book In Renaissance Studies from the Renaissance Society of America, and the 2026 Shakespeare Association of America First Book Award.

== Content ==
The book explores the abduction and trafficking of boys in England and the Ottoman Empire during early modernity, as well as its impact on homoerotic English and Ottoman literature, poetry, visual arts and play. It also examines the religious and racial aspects of abducted boys who are depicted in English and Ottoman art.

Topics featured in the book include the way that circumcision in the Ottoman Empire was depicted in Turkish and English sources, the depiction of the Indian boy in William Shakespeare's A Midsummer Night’s Dream and the works of English and Ottoman writers such as Gelibolulu Mustafa Ali (and his book Mevâ’idü’n-Nefâis) and Paul Rycaut.
