= Unnatural Causes =

Unnatural Causes may refer to:

- Manner of death (unnatural causes)
- Unnatural Causes (detective novel), 1967 detective novel by P. D. James.
- Unnatural Causes (1986 film), American television film
- Unnatural Causes (1993 film), British television film
- Unnatural Causes (TV series), 1986 British television anthology series
- Unnatural Causes: Is Inequality Making Us Sick?, 2008 American documentary
- Clean Break (film), 2008 American film released in Europe as Unnatural Causes
- Unnatural Causes, a song by Dublin Death Patrol from DDP 4 Life
