= H4 (film) =

- Film poster
- Directed by: Paul Quinn
- Written by: William Shakespeare (play); Ayanna Thompson (adaptation for screen)
- Produced by: Harry Lennix; Giovanni Zelko; Vanoy Burnough
- Starring: Harry Lennix; Angus Macfadyen; Nick Gillie; Victoria Tilford; Geno Monteiro; Keith David; Jeryl Sayles; Terrell Tilford; Keir Thirus; Heavy D
- Cinematography: John Pedone; Tony Rudenko
- Edited by: Bob Allen; Art Olmos (additional editing)
- Music by: Mark Nichols
- Production company: Triumvirate Pictures
- Release date: April 6, 2012 (Conference of the Shakespeare Association of America)
- Country: United States
- Language: English
- Budget: $200,000 (estim.)

H4 is a 2012 independent American film adaptation of Shakespeare's two Henry IV plays, produced by actor Harry Lennix who also stars in the title role, and directed by Paul Quinn and Dwain Perry. The film premiered at the 2012 Conference of the Shakespeare Association of America, and showed in competition at the 49th Chicago International Film Festival in 2013. The Shakespeare Association of America called it, "English history reborn into the African American now."

== Plot ==
The film is an adaptation that combines and condenses William Shakespeare's plays Henry IV, Part 1 and Henry IV, Part 2 and sets them in contemporary Los Angeles.

== Cast ==
- Harry Lennix as King Henry IV
- Keith David as Worcester
- Heavy D as Archbishop Scroop
- Angus Macfadyen as Falstaff
- Faith Evans
- Terrell Tilford as Westmoreland
- Amad Jackson as Prince Hal "Harry"
- Nick Gillie as Poins,
- Victoria Platt as Chief Justice
- Geno Monteiro as Hotspur
- Jeryl Prescott as Northumberland (credited as Jeryl Sayles)
- Kevin Yarborough as Edmund Mortimer, Earl of March
- Kamani Shillingford as Lord Hastings
- Keir Thirus as The Douglas
- Candice Coke as Pistol
- Diarra Kilpatrick as Clarice
- Sharon Ferguson as Lord Mowbray
- Evita Castine as Marion

== Development Background and Production ==
The screenplay was adapted by Dr. Ayanna Thompson, Professor of English at Arizona State University, who holds a PhD in English from Harvard and her master's degree from Sussex University. Lennix has said, "I was very lucky in finding Ayanna Thompson." The script retains most of Shakespeare's original language while condensing the duration and changing place names and factional nationalities to fit the new setting. The original Welsh, Scottish, and English, groups were changed to Haitians, Jamaicans, and African-Americans. Contemporized script tweaks include the "Prince of Watts" instead of the Prince of Wales, Falstaff calls for a cup of "malt liquor" and a capon, and lines like, "This is Inglewood, not Guantanamo Bay: there are no hooded men."

Production Design is by Lytel Young, and Costumes by Heather Capps.

Lennix had participated in Shakespeare symposiums previously, written articles on Shakespeare and race and contemporary relevance, and with Laurence Fishburne for years before the film had had numerous conversations and debates about Shakespeare, race, and performance. Lennix has said in interview:

"There are a lot of people who would think that Othello is a black Shakespeare film, but it's not. Othello is about one black guy in the midst of a bunch of people in Venice. So it's not really a black Shakespeare film. What I mean by black Shakespeare film is that for the first time, to my knowledge, on film, we have taken a Shakespearian play and placed in a recognizably black world experience. It's from the perspective of black people, acted primarily by black people, and it's from the black point of view." -Harry Lennix in 2013

Lennix said, "This film stands up to scholastic critique because we had scholars working on it from start to finish."

=== Funding ===
The budget is estimated to be $200,000. Post-production of the film was partly funded by a $25,000 Kickstarter campaign. Lennix said that funding services like IndieGoGo and Kickstarter created a general public vested interest and "we needed the support of the people who we hope will see the movie."

=== Casting ===
Lennix's career to this point in theater, film, and television encompassed multiple Shakespeare roles including Aaron the Moor in Julie Taymor's adaptation of Titus Andronicus.

Michael Dorn was reported in 2011 to be playing the lead role as Henry and had shot the entire movie. Lennix had not planned to do the role, until re-shoots became necessary and Dorn was unavailable. The eye-patch used in Lennix's performance was a costuming choice inspired by the fact that Dorn had required a real eye-patch during his shoots due to recent eye surgery.

Heavy D's involvement came about when Lennix's friend Avery O. Williams casually brought Heavy D to a rehearsal. Lennix had always been a fan and suddenly persuaded him to be in the movie.

Angus Macfadyen and Lennix had already been friends, and Lennix said they had done heavy drinking together in Rome years before.

== Release ==
In August 2012, a rough cut of the film was previewed at the International Shakespeare Conference in Stratford-upon-Avon to international Shakespeare scholars. Lennix said that it was received warmly there. It was shown at the 40th annual meeting of the Shakespeare Association of America in 2012 and later streamed on Amazon. In 2014, the film was shown at the Indie Memphis Film Festival and sponsored by various organizations at Rhodes College.

The film was scheduled for release in US cinemas in 2015.

The film was Heavy D's final screen role before his death in 2011, and the movie was released posthumously.

== Themes ==
Scholar Jennie Votava has said that H4 reveals that time and space in Shakespeare’s histories are mutable and ripe for, in the words of scholar Elisabeth Bronfen, "an infinite variety of appropriations." Academic analysis has said that H4 and Shakespeare adaptations set in contemporary America have a "productive instability." Votava has also pointed out that to 2023 seemingly no UK performances had cast a Falstaff of color, while Black actors in the US and Brazil were playing the role in the 1990's and 1970's, and that Falstaff as a character relates to constructions of white British nationhood. The almost all-Black cast in H4 takes advantage of that relationship by casting white, British actor Angus Macfadyen as Falstaff.

Iya Bakare wrote, "H4 parallels events in Shakespeare’s original play and what takes place in today’s society with leaders and their fathers, such as Jesse Jackson, Sr. and Jesse, Jr., Martin Luther King, Sr. and Martin, Jr., Adam Clayton Powell, Sr. and Adam, Jr. and others." Lennix has similarly said, "It just so happens that there is a lot of resonance between [Shakespeare's historical re-tellings] and black history, with regard to fathers giving their sons the keys to the kingdom, so to speak."

Thompson describes the script as being "about the politics and political manoeuvring within the African-American community", and said, "Because there are real tensions between recent Black immigrants from the islands and Africa and African-Americans who have been in the U.S. for a long time, it brought out different aspects of the play than if you were thinking of an Elizabethan setting." She has described Shakespeare's themes, and the film's, as "universal".

According to Lennix, "When you have a white character played by a black person, the way that they arrive at a destination may be different, but the ultimate end is the same. If Shakespeare must be studied by every student in the English speaking world, and beyond, because of its universal relevant themes and characters, then if it is truly universal, why do I so rarely see anyone black doing it? So with H4 I'm saying that it is universal."

== Reception ==
Chris Davis of the Memphis Flyer wrote, "Director Paul Quinn's brave embrace of theatrical device and nonrealism should be an inspiration, and possibly even a model, for filmmakers looking to tell huge stories with miniscule budgets." He also compared the use of words to the narration in Jean-Luc Godard's Alphaville.

Tim Brayton at Alternate Ending wrote that the post-production did not appear finished, and said that the compression of two plays causes an unhappy reduction of Falstaff scenes, but, "Seeing it rejuvenated like this is terrifically appealing. Lennix gives the [...] best performance of the cast, moody and tormented and regal in all the right ways. Best thought of as a visually uncertain recording of several engaging performances - a staged reading. H4 is a damn unique thing."

Critic Carla Renata said, "A lot of people when they hear Shakespeare they mentally tap out because 'I gotta think too hard to watch this.' So I'm appreciative of the fact that [Lennix's movie has] reconfigured these classics [to] make them relevant for a whole new audience that wouldn't normally pay attention to it or be interested in it." Jay Jacobs of Pop Entertainment wrote that the combination of modern scenes on LA streets plus the repeated use of the interior of a theatre gave it a timelessness as if it could have been done at The Globe Theater at any point in history between Shakespeare and the present.
