= Jeff Stetson =

American dramatist

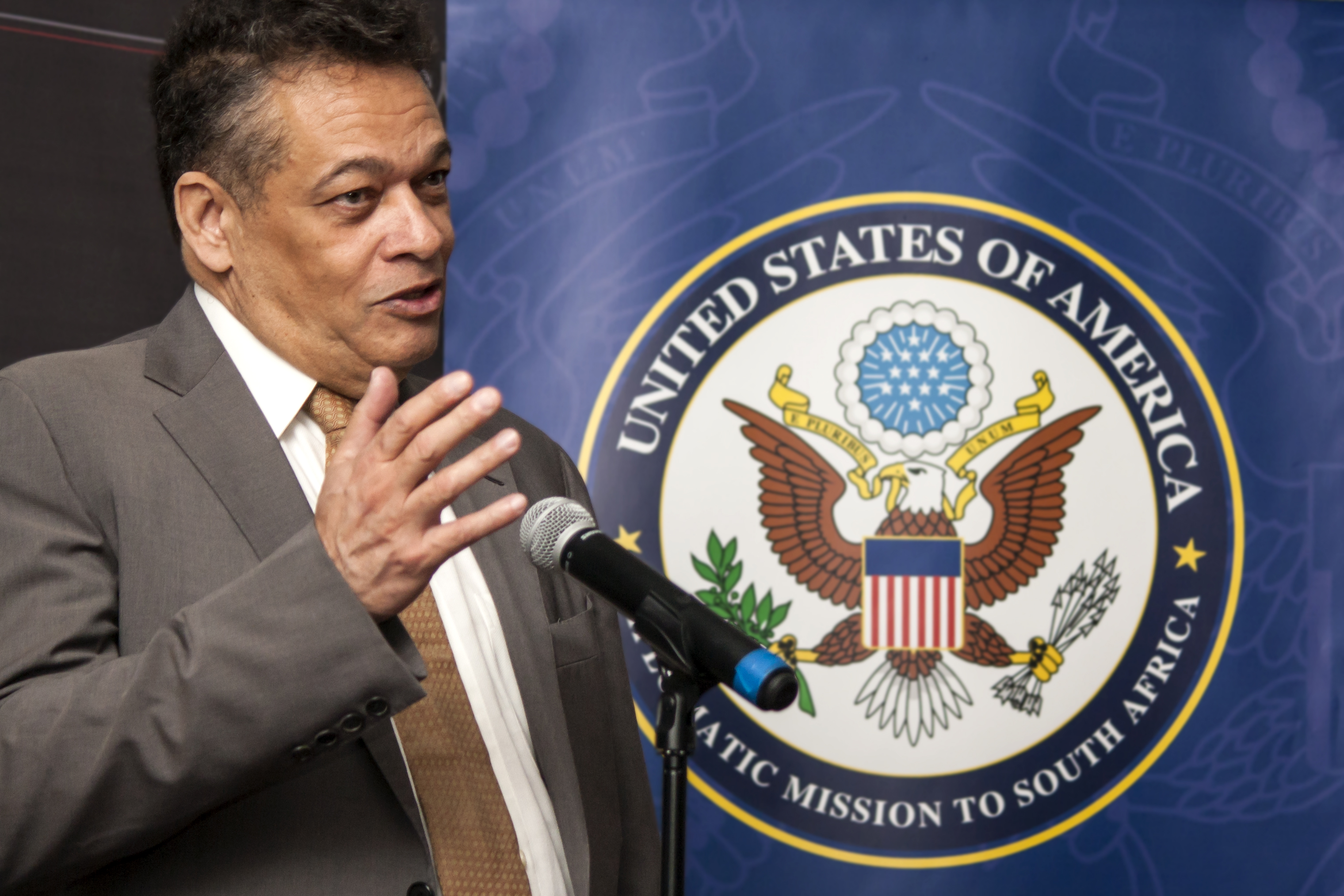
- Born: United States
- Occupations: Playwright, novelist
- Writing career
- Genres: Theatre, fiction

Jeff Stetson is an American writer best known for such novels and plays as Blood on the Leaves and The Meeting, a 1987 play about an imaginary meeting between Martin Luther King Jr. and Malcolm X in 1965 in a hotel in Harlem. The play was later televised on American Playhouse in 1989.
