= Shakespeare Association of America =

Academic society

The Shakespeare Association of America (SAA) is a non-profit organization founded in 1972 of professional and independent scholars for the advanced academic study of William Shakespeare's plays and poems and their cultural and theatrical contexts. The SAA hosts an annual conference each spring in a different US city.

== Publications ==
In 2016, Arden Shakespeare published Shakespeare in Our Time: A Shakespeare Association of America Collection to "… [mark] the 400th anniversary of Shakespeare's death by reflecting on the unrivalled work of the Shakespeare Association of America and offering a unique collection of leading Shakespeare scholars outlining key developments in Shakespeare studies over the last two decades." The volume contains contributions from scholars such as Lena Cowen Orlin, David Bevington, Barbara A. Mowat, Gary Taylor, Gail Kern Paster, Margreta de Grazia, Peter Holland, Lois Potter, Coppélia Kahn, Russ McDonald, Tiffany Stern, and Stephen Greenblatt.
