= Ayanna Thompson =

Professor of English

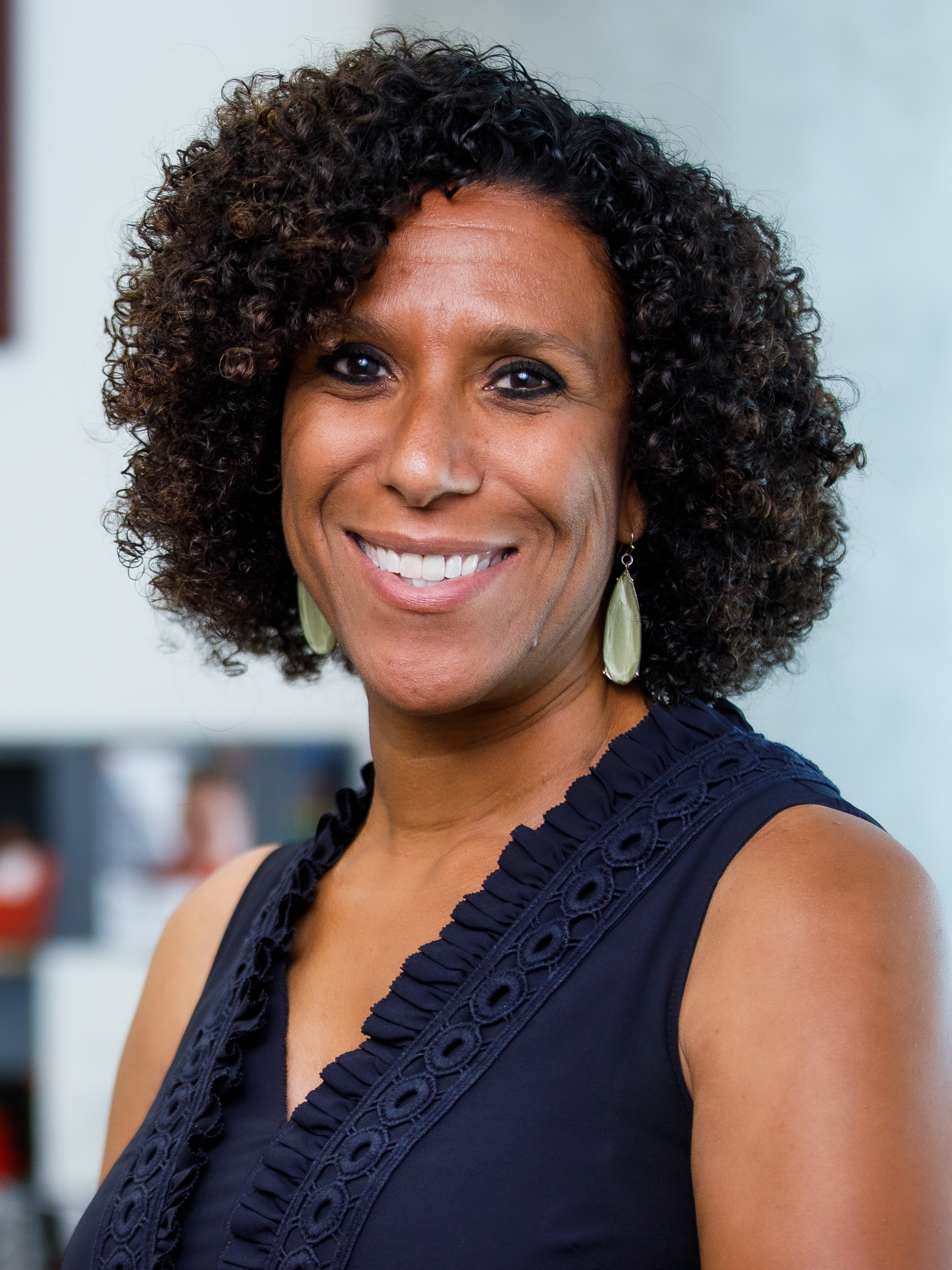
- Thompson in 2019
- Born: c. 1975 (age c. 51)

Academic background
- Education: Columbia University (BA); University of Sussex (MA); Harvard University (PhD)
- Thesis: Depicting Race and Torture on the Early Modern Stage

Academic work
- Discipline: English
- Institutions: Arizona State University

Ayanna Thompson (born c. 1975) is Regents Professor of English at Arizona State University and Executive Director of the Arizona Center for Medieval and Renaissance Studies (ACMRS). She was president of the Shakespeare Association of Americafrom 2018–2019. She specializes in Renaissance drama and issues of race in performance.

== Education ==
Thompson graduated with a BA from Columbia University in 1994, where she was a Kluge scholar, and was mentored by Edward Said. She won a Marshall Scholarship to study at the University of Sussex, receiving a Masters in 1995. She received her PhD from Harvard University in 2001. Her doctoral dissertation was Depicting Race and Torture on the Early Modern Stage.

== Career ==
Thompson was previously an investment banker at Lehman Brothers. Thompson was Professor at Arizona State University from 2004-2013 before her appointment at George Washington University. Thompson returned to the Phoenix Arizona region after five years. In 2016, Thompson spoke at Washington and Lee University's convocation ceremony. Thompson served as a Phi Beta Kappa Visiting Scholar, 2017-2018. She was previously President of the Shakespeare Association of America (2018–2019).

She currently serves on the boards of the journals Shakespeare Quarterly, Renaissance Drama, and Shakespeare Bulletin. She has served as a member of the Board of Directors for the Association of Marshall Scholars. In 2021 she was elected to the American Academy of Arts and Sciences. Thompson is an Associate Scholar and the Chair of the Royal Shakespeare Company's Research Board, and is a member of the Folger Shakespeare Library Board of Governors.

Thompson gave the keynote speech on "Shakespeare and Blackface" at the Shakespeare and Social Justice conference held at the University of Cape Town in association with the University of the Witwatersrand and the Shakespeare Association of Southern Africa in 2019.

As Executive Director of the Arizona Center for Medieval and Renaissance Studies, Thompson is the creator of RaceB4Race, an ongoing conference series and professional network community for scholars and students of premodern critical race studies. In 2021, Thompson's center and RaceB4Race received a $3.5m grant from the Mellon Foundation.

She is the author of several books including Blackface, Passing Strange: Shakespeare, Race, and Contemporary America, and Teaching Shakespeare with Purpose: A Student-Centered Approach. Thompson has been described as 'a world-class scholar', an 'accomplished leader', a 'true innovator', and 'a major force'.

In 2025, she was elected an International Fellow at the British Academy in the "Early Modern Languages and Literatures to 1830" section.

== Theater work ==
Ayanna Thompson serves as a consultant and dramaturg for many theater companies and is a Shakespeare Scholar in Residence at The Public Theater in New York.

=== Productions ===
- Dramaturg and text consultant for Steven Hogget and Christine Jones' 2025 production of Hamlet Hail to the Thief, which adapted Shakespeare's Hamlet to music by Radiohead.
- Dramaturg and text consultant for Sam Gold's 2025 production of ROMEO+JULIET at Circle in the Square Theatre, starring Kit Connor and Rachel Zegler.
- Dramaturg and text consultant for Carl Cofield's 2025 production of Pericles: A Public Works Concert Experience, staged at the Cathedral of St. John the Divine in New York City.
- Dramaturg and text consultant for Sam Gold's 2022 production of Macbeth on Broadway starring Daniel Craig and Ruth Negga.
- Dramaturg for the 2022 musical Suffs written by Shaina Taub.
- Dramaturg for Richard III, directed by Robert O'Hara for The Public Theater in 2022.
- Shakespeare scholar in consultation for three productions directed by Saheem Ali: Merry Wives at The Delacorte Theater in 2021, Romeo y Julieta on WNYC's Free Shakespeare on the Radio, and Richard II, also on WNYC's Free Shakespeare on the Radio.

== Bibliography ==
- Blackface – Object Lessons (Bloomsbury 2021)
- (ed.) The Cambridge Companion to Shakespeare and Race (Cambridge: Cambridge University Press 2021)
- Shakespeare in the Theatre: Peter Sellars (London: The Arden Shakespeare, 2018)
- Shakespeare, Race and Performance: The Diverse Bard, ed. by Delia Jarrett-Macauley (Abingdon: Routledge, 2017)
- (ed.) Colorblind Shakespeare: New Perspectives on Race and Performance (London: Routledge, 2016)
- (Co-authored with Laura Turchi) Teaching Shakespeare With Purpose: A Student-Centred Approach (London: Bloomsbury Arden Shakespeare, 2016)
- Introduction to Othello, edited by E. A. J. Honigmann (London: Arden Shakespeare, 2016)
- Passing Strange: Shakespeare, Race, And Contemporary America (Oxford: Oxford University Press, 2011)
- (Co-edited with Scott Newstok) Weyward Macbeth: Intersections of Race and Performance (London: Palgrave, 2010)
- Performing Race and Torture on the Early Modern Stage (New York: Routledge, 2008)
