= The Meeting (play) =

American play

- Original language: English
- Written by: Jeff Stetson
- Characters: Martin Luther King Jr. Malcolm X
- Genre: Drama

Premiere
- Date: 1987
- Place: Harlem, New York City, New York

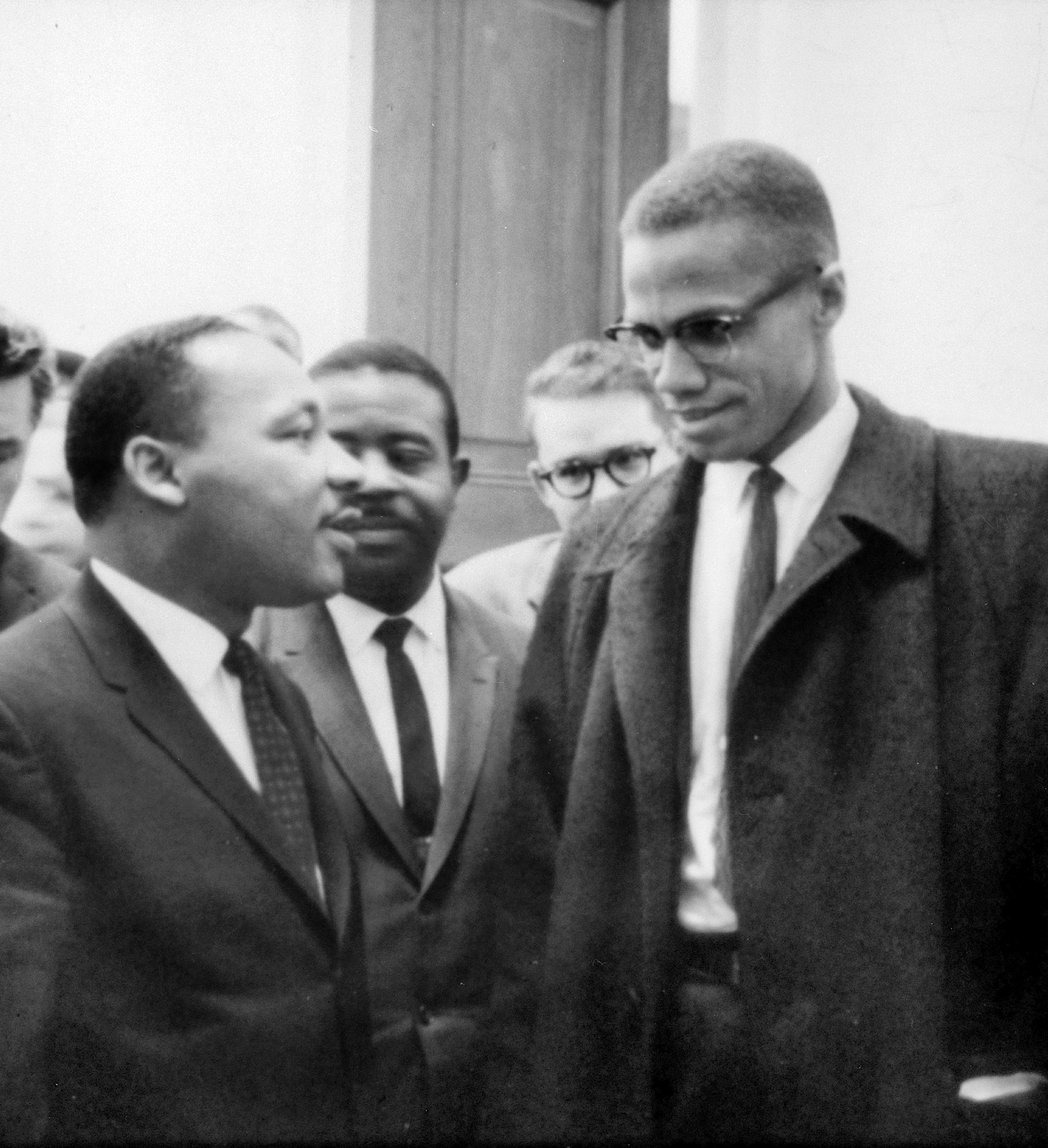
Martin Luther King Jr. and Malcolm X, March 26, 1964 – the only (momentary) meeting the two ever had

The Meeting is a 1987 American play by Jeff Stetson about an imaginary meeting between Martin Luther King Jr. and Malcolm X in 1965 in a hotel in Harlem during the height of the Civil Rights Movement. The play was later televised on American Playhouse in 1989.

== Reception ==
The Meeting won a Louis B. Mayer Award and eight 1987 NAACP Theatre Awards. It has been performed throughout Europe, the United States and in Nairobi.

== Performance history ==
A 1987 performance was reviewed by The New York Times. A 1989 and later 1990's performance in Chicago starred Harry Lennix.

== Actual meeting ==
In reality, the two men only met once, while both were in Washington, D.C. to watch the Senate debates regarding the (eventual) passing of the Civil Rights Act of 1964. On March 26, 1964, they briefly spoke with each other as they walked through the United States Senate together for about a minute.

== In popular culture ==
The play was parodied by the sketch comedy show, Key and Peele, Peele playing King and Key playing Malcolm X.

== See also ==
- Civil rights movement in popular culture
- Two-hander
