= Titus Andronicus (character) =

- Titus Andronicus character
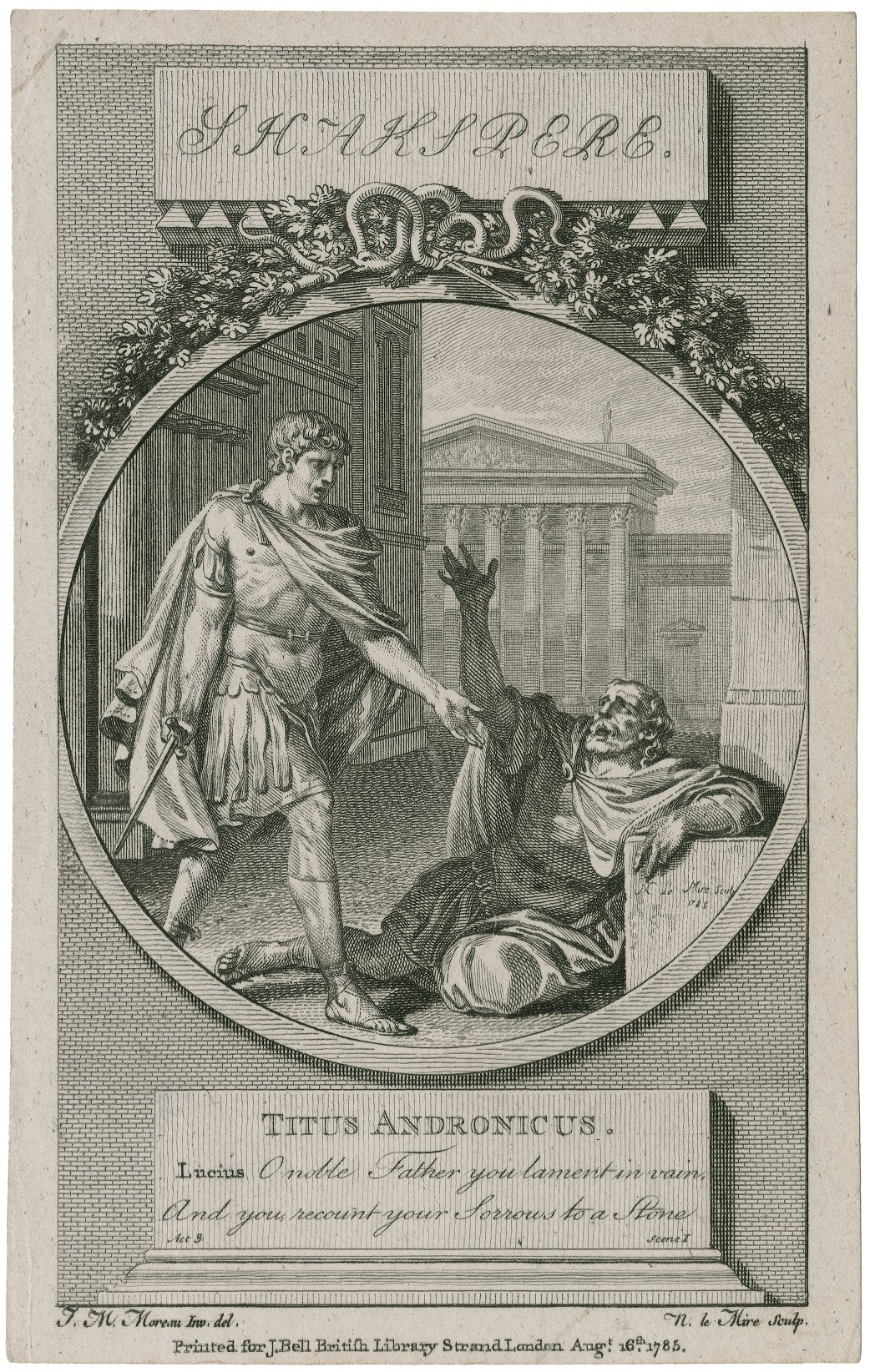
- Jean-Michel Moreau's illustration of Titus Andronicus (right) being told by his son Lucius that the tribunes have left, from Act 3, Scene 1; engraved by N. le Mire (1785)
- Created by: William Shakespeare
- Based on: Andronikos I Komnenos
- Portrayed by: Anthony Hopkins and Trevor Peacock among others

In-universe information
- Family: Brother: Marcus Andronicus; Nephew: Publius; Grandson: Young Lucius
- Children: Sons: Lucius, Quintus, Martius, Mutius; Daughter: Lavinia
- Nationality: Roman

Titus Andronicus is the main character in William Shakespeare's revenge tragedy of the same name, Titus Andronicus. Titus is introduced as a Roman nobleman and revered general. Prior to the events of the play, he dedicated ten years of service in the war against the Goths, losing 21 sons in the conflict. In the opening act, Titus orders that the eldest son of Tamora, Queen of the Goths, be sacrificed according to Roman tradition in order to avenge his dead kin. He is also offered the emperorship, but he declines the honor and bestows it upon the late emperor's son, Saturninus. When Saturninus is denied the ability to pick his first choice of empress, Lavinia, he chooses to wed Tamora. Throughout the rest of the play, Titus and Tamora remain locked in a battle of brutal revenge. The play thus descends into moral chaos as characters perpetrate or find themselves victims of various egregious offenses, including rape, mutilation, and murder.

== Comparisons ==
Jonathan Bate, Geoffrey Bullough and some other scholars have suggested that Andronicus comes from Andronicus Comnenus, a 12th-century Byzantine emperor, who shared Titus' proclivity for shooting arrows with messages attached. Like Titus Andronicus, Andronicus Comnenus was a violent ruler who was ultimately overthrown and brutally killed by his own people. In addition, both Andronicus Comnenus and Titus Andronicus lost their right hand shortly before their death. When Anthony Hopkins played a stylized version of the character in the 1999 film Titus, he described the character as a combination of King Lear and Hannibal Lecter. Although Titus Andronicus is the main character, some productions have adapted the play to be seen through the character of his grandson, Young Lucius.

== Summary of role in play ==
The play begins with Titus returning home after many years at war with the Goths, bringing the remaining four of his twenty-five sons with him. Titus is selected by the people of Rome to be the new emperor, but refuses this offer due to his old age. In his place, he chooses the former emperor's eldest son, Saturninus. Through the ceremonial sacrifice of his most noble captive, Alarbus—the eldest son of Tamora, Queen of the Goths—Titus unknowingly sparks a vicious cycle of revenge. Throughout the play, Titus seeks revenge on Tamora for injustices against his family, while simultaneously being the target of Tamora's own quest for revenge.

Titus murders five people during the play, including one of his sons, Mutius, and his daughter, Lavinia. Displaying strict adherence to Roman law, he murders Mutius for not complying with his order for Lavinia to marry the new emperor, Saturninus. The second act of filicide occurs at the end of the play when Titus murders Lavinia, so that she does not have to live with the shame of having been raped and mutilated by Tamora's sons, Chiron and Demetrius. In Titus' final act of revenge upon Tamora, he kills Chiron and Demetrius and uses their blood and bones as the ingredients of a pie: "Hark, villains, I will grind your bones to dust, / And with your blood and it I’ll make a paste, / And of the paste a coffin I will rear, / And make two pasties of your shameful heads" (5.2.186–189). Titus serves this pie to Tamora before killing her. As is customary in Shakespearean tragedy, Titus also dies in the end, killed by Saturninus. Saturninus is then killed by Titus' last remaining son, Lucius, bringing the cycle of revenge to an end.

== Thematic interpretations and scholarship ==
=== Heroism ===
Brown University Professor Coppélia Kahn identified Titus's development throughout the play as one from "Roman hero" to "revenge hero" in her 1997 novel Roman Shakespeare: Warriors, Wounds, and Women, in which she examines the role of gender in various Shakespeare plays through a feminist lens. In further scholarship, the presentation of heroism as a whole in the play has been explored through its inextricable link to violence in adherence to true Roman form.

Interpretation of Khan's two hero labels has incited the proposal of key distinctions between the facets of a "Roman hero" and "revenge hero." Titus as a "Roman hero" is a renowned and venerated war veteran, and he embodies the Roman ideal to such a notable degree that he is offered the greatest honor a Roman citizen can achieve: the emperorship. At the beginning of the play, he tends to prioritize the service of his country as well as the enforcement of law and tradition over the protection of his family. Provided examples of this behavior include his sacrifice of many sons to the war effort and his murder of Mutius for the disobedience of his command. On the other hand, this reading highlights how Titus the "revenge hero" does the opposite, prioritizing a pursuit of vengeance on behalf of his family in defiance of law and order and committing crimes against other Roman citizens and the state as a whole. However, this interpretation delineates his development with a caveat, as Titus is never truly able to escape the mold of Roman ideals, committing filicide once again at the end of the play in line with tradition and family order.

=== Filicide ===
Titus' acts of filicide, of Mutius and of Lavinia, are contested onstage by characters including Titus' sons Lucius and Marcus and, in reference to Lavinia's death, Saturninus. In doing so, the play raises moral questions surrounding the justification of filicide. In its justification, or, alternately, in the complaints against Titus' behavior, tensions arise between the Roman honor code of law and personal justice. Scholar Emily Detmer-Goebel points out the role of honor, and dishonoring, in Titus' filicides. Titus kills Mutius because he feels "insulted" and "dishonor[ed]" in a way, Detmer-Goebel argues, is tied to his allegiance with Rome; his familial relationship with Mutius has no bearing on the incident. The murder, additionally, can be seen as an expression, and critique, of the power in Roman society of a father over his children.

Titus' killing of Lavinia, on the other hand, is considered (through reference to the mythological filicide of Virginius) by Saturninus as justified through personal or family honor: "Because the girl should not survive her shame, / And by her presence still renew [the father's] sorrows." The familial, emotional response to shame is called on for reasoning here, rather than its threat to Roman honor and order. Titus, through the play, seems to come to regret Mutius' death, and his prioritization of "national justice" for Rome over "personal justice." According to Detmer-Goebel's reading, therefore, Titus' later "blind yet understandable anger" indicates his embrace of that sense of personal vengeance. However, this very vengeance "endangers" his family (through the death of Lavinia).

=== Patriarchy ===
In Roman Shakespeare: Warriors, Wounds, and Women, Kahn highlights how Titus's revenge is motivated by the marring of his daughter's virtue rather than any offenses carried out against him directly. She asserts that Titus only transforms into one of the principle actors of revenge in the play due to his supposed sense of ownership over Lavinia's virtue, an ownership that she says embodies the values of traditional patriarchal structures. Furthermore, she addresses Shakespeare's characterization of Lavinia as an almost excessive paragon of patriarchal womanhood, literally robbed of her voice and compliant as a prop in her father's revenge schemes, but never enacting revenge on her own. Titus eventually makes the choice to kill Lavinia as a show of mercy, motivated by the urge to spare her of living with the shame of having been defiled in such a gruesome manner. In Kahn's reading, this action solidifies Titus's role as a manifestation of "patriarchal values", where the state in which his daughter can and should be allowed to exist falls under his own jurisdiction.

=== Tradition and textual precedent ===
At the very beginning of the play, Titus orders the ritual sacrifice of Tamora's son, Alarbus, to pay for the loss of his own kin in the war against the Goths. Duquesne University Professor Danielle St. Hilaire viewed this action as a sign of Titus's devotion to honoring the Roman literary tradition and acting according to associated textual precedents. The sacrifice mirrors killings conducted by mythological figures such as Achilles and Aeneas, who both carried out battlefield carnage to avenge a fallen companion in their respective myths. At the end of the Aeneid, Aeneas specifically seeks out the man responsible for murdering Pallas, a son-like figure to the mythological hero. Thus, St. Hilaire asserts that Titus' demand for Alarbus to be sacrificed is a reflection of a larger Roman cultural legacy, one that justifies retributive killing in the name of the dead no matter the level of cruelty it requires.

St. Hilaire also observed that the play's disintegration into chaos, immorality, and incivility develops alongside other characters' inability to live according to these textual and cultural traditions, largely due to misinterpretation or ignorance. This is most evident with the Goths, especially in how Chiron and Demetrius inaccurately quote the character of Phaedra in Seneca's play of the same name, before raping Lavinia. Not only do they misquote the Roman text they cite, but they also reference one that doesn't best fit their scheme. A more correct parallel would be found in Ovid's Metamorpheses in the character of Philomela, whose rape and mutilation mirrors Lavinia's almost identically. St. Hilaire highlights how in contrast, Titus refers to Roman texts and adheres to the precedents within them with great accuracy in various incidents throughout the play. Titus' death not only marks the final manifestation of Roman textual precedent as a retributive killing for the sacrifice of Alarbus, but also the decay of Roman literary tradition and cultural precedent through its improper use.
