= Roman Shakespeare: Warriors, Wounds, and Women =

1997 book by Coppelia Kahn

- Author: Coppélia Kahn
- Language: English
- Series: Feminist Readings of Shakespeare
- Genre: Non-fiction
- Publication date: 1997

Roman Shakespeare: Warriors, Wounds, and Women is a 1997 book by Coppélia Kahn that reads Shakespearean texts from a gendered perspective, focusing on the construction of masculine identity in Roman ideology. It is part of the Feminist Readings of Shakespeare series.

== Summary ==
In her book, Kahn, Professor of English, Emerita, at Brown University, delivers a feminist critical study of William Shakespeare's Roman plays: Titus Andronicus, Julius Caesar, Antony and Cleopatra, and Coriolanus (with a postscript on Cymbeline). Shakespeare's long narrative poem The Rape of Lucrece is also examined from a feminist approach. Roman Shakespeare is broken down into six chapters. The first chapter provides an overview of Kahn's claims of the construction of Roman male identity, especially as it appeared on the English stage, and the subsequent chapters each focus on a different Shakespearean Roman text to explicate the gendered discourses within.

The book is prefaced by a piece by Feminist Readings of Shakespeare series editor Ann Thompson, who aligns the goals of the series with that of the seminal 1975 feminist work Shakespeare and the Nature of Women, citing author Juliet Dusinberre's intentions of investigating Shakespearean texts to interrogate "women's place in culture, history, religion, society, the family."

== Reception ==
Naomi Conn Liebler begins her review by discussing the "pervasive misogyny" which permeates any discussion of Shakespeare's Roman plays. Liebler agrees with much of Kahn's arguments, but she claims an oversight on Kahn's part in which the third elements in the subtitle is neglected: women. Liebler maintains that women are underrepresented at crucial points in Kahn's book, a missed opportunity in a book dedicated to feminist readings.

Linda Woodbridge states in her review that Kahn's arguments will influence many fine future classroom debates, but she questions whether Kahn adequately fulfilled her central claim that the works critique the Roman ideology of gender.

Lynn Enterline's review is distinct because she examines Kahn's subtitle, claiming that Kahn's ordering of "wounds" between "warriors" and "women" is reminiscent of an "unhappy bridge" separating the two genders, suggesting the unresolved tensions between males and females and that "the wound cuts both ways."
