= Barbara Mowat =

Barbara Adams Mowat (29 January 1934 – 24 November 2017) was an American literary scholar who served as director of research at the Folger Shakespeare Library, editor of Shakespeare Quarterly, and co-edited more than 40 editions of Shakespeare's plays and poems with Paul Werstine.

== Biography ==
Born Barbara Sue Adams in Eufaula, Alabama, she graduated with a mathematics degree from Auburn University in 1956 and pursued graduate studies in philosophy of science in Innsbruck, Austria, on a Fulbright scholarship. She later earned a master's degree in English literature from the University of Virginia in 1961 and a Ph.D. from Auburn University in 1968.

Mowat taught at Auburn University from 1969 to 1980 and was dean at Washington College in Chestertown, Maryland, before joining the Folger Shakespeare Library. She researched on themes of magic and supernatural elements in Shakespearean drama, such as witches in Macbeth and supernatural figures in A Midsummer Night's Dream and Julius Caesar, eventually retiring in 2009.

She married John G. Mowat in Austria and had two children.
