= Clean Break (film) =

- Original Theatrical Poster
- Directed by: Robert Malenfant
- Written by: Robert Malenfant
- Starring: Tara Reid; Angus Macfadyen; Colm Meaney
- Cinematography: Jacques Haitkin
- Distributed by: Sony Pictures Entertainment
- Release dates: 2008 (Europe); July 3, 2012 (United States)
- Running time: 93 minutes
- Country: United States
- Language: English

Clean Break is a 2008 American drama thriller film starring Tara Reid, Angus Macfadyen, and Colm Meaney. It was released in select European markets in 2008 and in the United States on July 3, 2012 (as a video on demand title) under the title Unnatural Causes.

== Plot ==
Julia and Matt are the owners of a successful advertising agency in Barcelona. Apparently they are happily married, but Matt, a very talented professional but unstable person, is confident his wife is cheating on him. He has her followed and when he thinks his suspicions are confirmed, arranges her murder. Unable to stand his own guilt Matt commits suicide. Julia has survived the murder attempt but her life is still in danger in a world of where everything is possible for the rise to power.

== Cast ==
- Tara Reid - Julia McKay
- Colm Meaney - Trevor Jones
- Angus Macfadyen - Matt McKay
- Francesc Garrido - Álvaro
- Robert Galzarano - Bobby McKay
- Lorena Bernal - Eva
- Mingo Ràfols - Inspector Jiménez
- George Wendt - Chuck
- Marta Bayarri - Ana
- Roger Delmont - Daniel
- Ludovic Tattevin - Antonio
- Sue Flack - Rose McKay
- Anna Diogene - Notario Myalar
- Joan Pico - Luis
- Albert Riballo - Miguel

== Reception ==
Monica Meijer, writing for CineMagazine, rated the film 1.5 stars.
