= Harry Lennix =

American actor (born 1964)

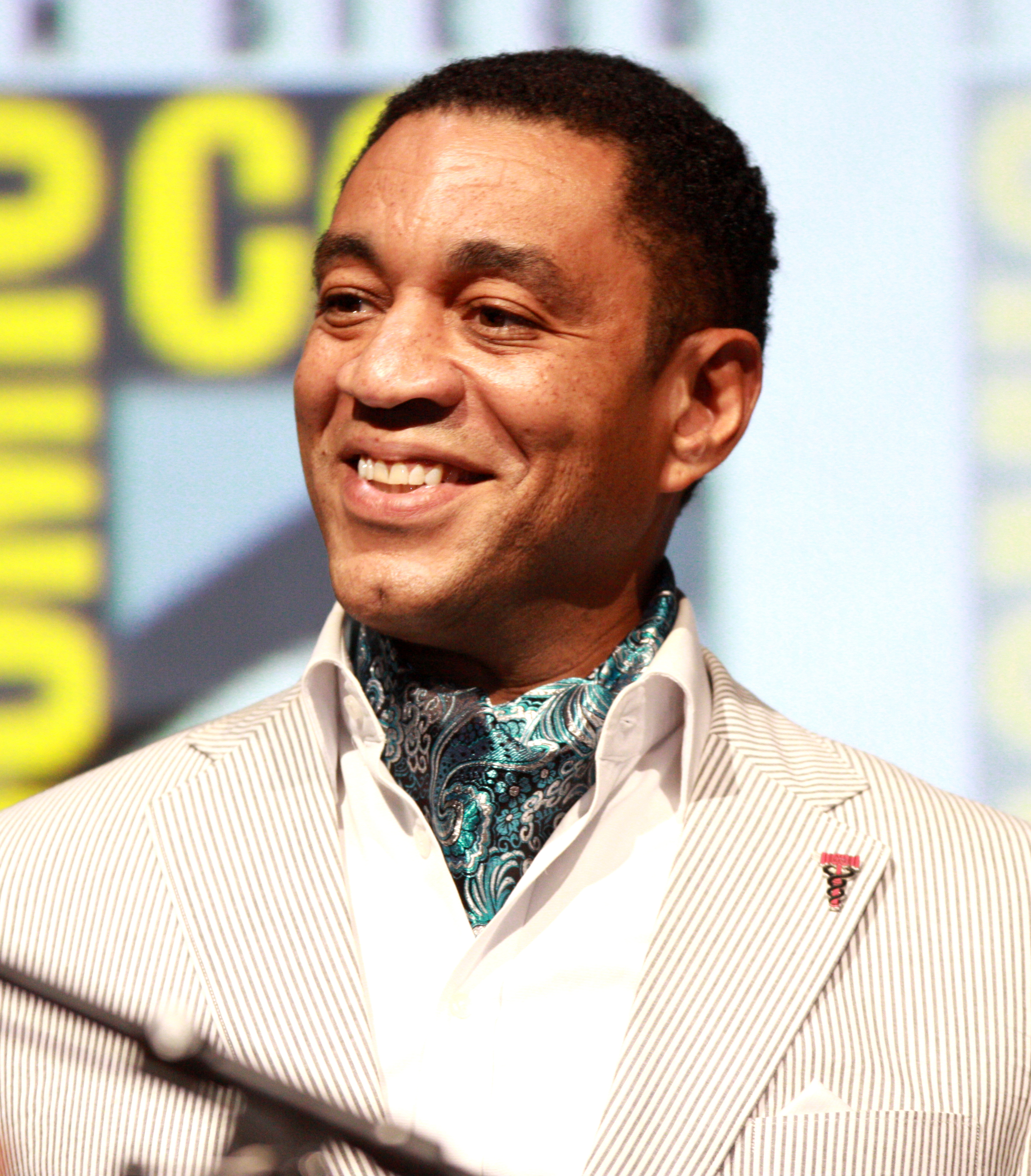
- Lennix at the 2013 San Diego Comic-Con
- Born: Harold Joseph Lennix III; November 16, 1964 (age 62); Chicago, Illinois, U.S.
- Education: Northwestern University
- Occupation: Actor
- Years active: 1983–present
- Spouse: Djena Graves (m. 2009)

Harold Joseph Lennix III (born November 16, 1964) is an American actor noted for extensive work on screen and stage.

Lennix made his film debut in The Package (1989), before taking roles in The Five Heartbeats (1991), Love & Basketball (2000), and Ray (2004). He has collaborated with director Spike Lee acting in three of his films Clockers (1995), Get on the Bus (1996), and Chi-Raq (2016). Lennix also portrayed Commander Lock in The Matrix Reloaded and The Matrix Revolutions (both 2003) and played Calvin Swanwick / Martian Manhunter in the DC Extended Universe films Man of Steel (2013), Batman v Superman: Dawn of Justice (2016), and Zack Snyder's Justice League (2021).

On television, he played Boyd Langton in the Fox science-fiction series Dollhouse (2009–2010) and Harold Cooper in the NBC drama The Blacklist (2013–2023). He took recurring roles in shows such as Billions (2016–2023), Insecure (2018–2021). On stage, he acted in the Branden Jacobs-Jenkins play Purpose (2025) for which he was nominated for a Tony Award for Best Actor in a Play.

== Early life ==
The youngest of four siblings, Lennix was born in Chicago, Illinois, to Lillian C. (née Vines), a laundry worker, and Harry Lennix Jr., a machinist. His mother was Black-American and his father was Creole from Louisiana.

Lennix attended Quigley Preparatory Seminary South and intended to become a priest. His first play was with the seminary. After a few weeks at seminary, he changed paths to Northwestern University "to pursue a girl", and settled on career choice in drama and majored in Acting and Direction. In his senior year at Northwestern, he was the coordinator of the African-American student organization, For Members Only. Lennix taught music for Chicago Public Schools for eight years. While in school himself and teaching, he commuted two hours between Englewood for teaching and then performances in plays at night. He continued acting training and performed at the Goodman Theatre and Steppenwolf Theatre.

== Career ==
=== 1989–1999 ===
Lennix's first film role was in The Package (1989), which was a Chicago production. Lennix starred in the film Titus (1999), based on Shakespeare's Titus Andronicus, as Aaron the Moor, the secret lover of the Queen of the Goths; in the Showtime Networks television film Keep the Faith, Baby (2002) as reverend and Congressman Adam Clayton Powell Jr.; and in the ABC television series Commander in Chief.

Lennix played Malcolm X in a 1989 production of The Meeting, which earned him an Obie Award. Lennix also performed the play years later. Jack Helbig at the Chicago Reader said about the 1989 performance, "Harry J. Lennix’s uncanny impersonation of Malcolm X went a long way toward redeeming the play. Luckily, Lennix also has the gift of being able to make the most ridiculous lines sound real. “We are all pawns,” he says at one point, somehow convincing us that he is the first person ever to have thought of that."

Lennix also starred as Levee in August Wilson's Ma Rainey's Black Bottom at the Goodman Theater in 1997. The production broke box office records. For a later 2026 production in which Lennix returned to the same play and theatre as musical director, Lennix said:

August Wilson came to one of our preview performances [in 1997], wrote [director] Chuck Smith a note that 'I've never seen a better production of this, thank you.' It brings back ghosts, so I think it's haunted, it's fraught with drama, it's fraught with trauma, it's fraught with great music, great humor and also great pain, kind of like life. The play is set in Chicago, so we feel a special ownership, a proprietary pride in it. This is my home theater. This theater gave me my first equity job, while I was still in college, while I was at Northwestern.

Lennix was the first recipient of an Ollie Award for his portrayal of Malcolm X at the Goodman Theater in Chicago, and received two Joseph Jefferson Citations for his roles in August Wilson's Ma Rainey's Black Bottom and Caught in the Act. He also starred as King Hedley II at the Mark Taper Forum in LA. In 2001, he was part of the first American company to be invited to the Royal Shakespeare Company.

In film, Lennix has had supporting roles such as The Five Heartbeats (1991), Comfortably Numb (1995), Get on the Bus (1996) in which he plays the lover of a gay ex-Marine played by Isaiah Washington, Love & Basketball (2000), The Matrix series (1999–2004), Ray (2004), Barbershop 2: Back in Business (2004), Stomp the Yard (2007), and State of Play (2009).

In television, he had a recurring role in Diagnosis: Murder as Agent Ron Wagner as well as a guest voice role as Mar Londo in the Legion of Super Heroes episode "Timber Wolf". He also had a recurring role in the sixth season of 24 as Muslim civil rights activist Walid Al-Rezani. He appeared on the series House M.D. as a paralyzed legendary jazz trumpet player, and in six episodes of ER as Dr. Greg Fischer. He also appeared in the episode "The Blame Game" of the first season of Ally McBeal. He played the parts of Boyd Langton in Joss Whedon's series Dollhouse and U.S. president Barack Obama in the comedy sketch show Little Britain USA.

=== 2000–2009 ===
Lennix has directed and appeared in numerous stage productions, including: Permanent Collection in 2005 with the Northlight Theater Company, which was also presented at the Greenway Arts Alliance in Los Angeles and later directed by Lennis at LA's Kirk Douglas Theater. He directed the stage version of Robert Townsend's film The Five Heartbeats, which received three NAACP Theater Award nominations and The Glass Menagerie for Chicago's Steppenwolf Theater Company. Lennix made his Broadway debut in August Wilson's Tony-nominated play, Radio Golf, directed by Kenny Leon. In 2009, Lennix directed The St. James Infirmary with the Congo Square Theatre Company at the Chicago Center for Performing Arts. In 2007, he was an official festival judge at the first annual Noor Iranian Film Festival.

Lennix has numerous Shakespearean credits. Lennix was also part of the first American company to be invited to the Royal Shakespeare Company, in 2001. In 2007, Lennix starred in the Steve Marvel-directed all-black version of Macbeth at the Lillian Theatre in Loss Angeles. Lennix has presented at Shakespeare symposiums in 2004, 2008, and 2010. He has also written multiple scholarly publications including an article in Weyward MacBeth: Intersections of Race and Performance (2009) and an interview in a special issue Shakespeare Bulletin in 2009, and specifically on the subject of race, Shakespeare, and contemporary relevance. With Laurence Fishburne he has had numerous conversations and debates about Shakespeare, race, and performance.

On the topic of his Henry IV adaptation H4 and Shakespeare in general, Lennix has said:

"When you have a white character played by a black person, the way that they arrive at a destination may be different, but the ultimate end is the same. If Shakespeare must be studied by every student in the English speaking world, and beyond, because of its universal relevant themes and characters, then if it is truly universal, why do I so rarely see anyone black doing it? So with H4 I'm saying that it is universal."

"There are a lot of people who would think that Othello is a black Shakespeare film, but it's not. Othello is about one black guy in the midst of a bunch of people in Venice. So it's not really a black Shakespeare film. What I mean by black Shakespeare film is that for the first time, to my knowledge, on film, we have taken a Shakespearian play and placed in a recognizably black world experience. It's from the perspective of black people, acted primarily by black people, and it's from the black point of view." -Harry Lennix in 2013

=== 2010–present ===
In 2010, Lennix had planned to star in an African-diasporic film version of Macbeth, with director Aleta Chappelle and tentatively also starring Terence Howard, Sanaa Lathan, Blair Underwood, and Danny Glover. Also in 2012, Lennix produced and starred in the lead role in several film productions (see Producer-Actor Projects below) including H4, a modernized Shakespeare film adaptation of Henry IV, Mr. Sophistication which is about a stand-up comedian, and the biblical story Revival!. In Mr. Sophistication (2012), Lennix plays a self-destructive stand-up comedian trying to make a comeback while also having trouble with his interracial marriage. The part was written for Lennix by the director, Danny Green, after Green had observed Lennix dressing someone down. Ebony said that the role resembles the late life of Richard Pryor. Lennix said that the "jerky" personality is based on director Green. As preparation, Lennix studied Lenny Bruce, Dick Gregory, Bernie Mac (who Lennix had seen repeatedly previously in appearances at Milt Trenier's Lounge, a noted cabaret in Chicago), Alonzo Bodden, but mostly Pryor. Lennix had previously done some live improv including with Del Close (of Second City, The Committee, and Saturday Night Live) in the past, but never stand-up comedy. For ten seasons, Lennix co-starred in the role of Harold Cooper, assistant director of the FBI Counterterrorism Division, on the NBC drama The Blacklist (2013–2023).

Lennix participated in the 2014 Chicago Humanities Festival and discussed the book “Black Theater is Black Life: An Oral History of Chicago Theater” with its author, Northwestern University professor Harvey Young. H4 (2012) is an adaptation of William Shakespeare's Henry IV, modernized to a Los Angeles setting while keeping much of the original language. Lennix plays King Henry IV. Keith David and Heavy D also appear. In July 2014, Lennix formed his own production company Exponent Media Group (EMG) along with long time business partner Steve Harris. EMG had a distribution deal with NEHST studios for three of the company's titles: Mr. Sophistication (2012) (see below); H4 in (2012); and Revival! (2018). In 2015, Lennix appeared in Chi-Raq, directed by Spike Lee. Lennix called the film "brave and bold", as it addresses "the violence that’s happening right now in Chicago". Batman v Superman: Dawn of Justice in 2016 featured Lennix reprising the role of Calvin Swanwick from 2013's Man of Steel, both directed by Zack Snyder. Lennix made an additional appearance as Swanwick in Snyder's version of Justice League, released in 2021.

Revival! (2018) is a gospel concert movie that Lennix has described as Jesus Christ Superstar meets The Wiz. Lennix plays Pontius Pilate. Jesus is played by Mali Music. The cast also includes Chaka Khan as Herodia, the wife of Herod, and Michelle Williams of Destiny's Child. Elaine Hegwood Bowen at The Chicago Crusader wrote, "It is magnificent in its vivid, rousing storytelling and vibrant costumes throughout." A review by Jonita Davis at The Black Cape Magazine said the film is "like an Easter reunion for those of us who grew up in the Black pop culture and Black Church" and that it could "finally" replace Charlton Heston’s The Ten Commandments (1956) as the film to watch in the weeks before Easter. Lauren Turner in a review at BRWC wrote, "A constant beat and thump of live music keeps the story moving between more serious scenes, punctuated by musical numbers and dance scenes. We’re not in Nazareth anymore," and said the singing is sometimes "cringe" though the original compositions are good."

During the Chicago Goodman Theater's 2024–2025 season, Lennix played the role of Henry Drummond in the Jerome Lawrence and Robert E. Lee play Inherit the Wind.

== Music ==
In 2026, Lennix was the musical director for a production of August Wilson's Ma Rainey's Black Bottom.

"When I watch [Lennix] work, there is a sort of jazz-inflected rhythm in [his] delivery and response with [his] fellow actors. Even [his] work in Shakespeare has a musical sensibility."

— Lennix’s collaborator, Northlight Theatre Company director BJ Jones

Lennix learned to play the trumpet while working on August Wilson’s Ma Rainey’s Black Bottom. He also played the saxophone in a production and has played the piano in other theatrical roles. Northlight Theatre Company director BJ Jones said that Lennix played jazz piano in the rehearsal room during a run of Permanent Collection (2005), and shared Red Garland CDs with him. A 2018 episode of the PBS series The History Makers contains video of Lennix playing piano with a band and singing on stage at an event. In 2005, he played the part of a fictional legendary jazz musician in an episode of House.

== Personal life ==
In 2009, Lennix married business executive Djena Graves.

Lennix is a member of the Omega Psi Phi fraternity. He was initiated into the fraternity in November 2012 via the Theta Kappa Kappa graduate chapter in Evanston, Illinois.

Lennix has given multiple college commencement speeches including 2006 at Santa Monica College (speech entitled "Do Not Stop, Do Not Slow Down") and 2008 at Arizona State University (speech entitled "Acting While Black").

Lennix is Catholic.

=== Community Work ===
Lennix is developing a performing arts center in the Bronzeville of Chicago and has been given $26 million dollars from the state of Illinois for the project, which will include a "Lillian Marcie Center." The facility is planned to include a museum and two performance spaces, one of about 350 seats and one of about 100 seats.

The Illinois Broadcasters Association said that Lennix has a foundation, The Lennix Foundation, which "aims to support young artists and promote cultural enrichment within underprivileged communities." In 2023, Lennix was awarded by HeartShare Human Services of New York for a "commitment to [...] community that transforms the landscape for underserved and marginalized populations."

== Acting credits ==
=== Film ===
Year	Title	Role	Notes
1989	The Package	Johnny's Field Soldier	
1991	The Five Heartbeats	Dresser	
1991	Victimless Crimes	Baker	
1992	Bob Roberts	Franklin Dockett	
1992	Mo' Money	Tom Dilton	Credited as Harry J. Lennix
1994	Guarding Tess	Kenny Young	Credited as Harry J. Lennix
1994	Notes in a Minor Key	Teddy	Short
1995	Comfortably Numb	Hamlin Day	
1995	Clockers	Bill Walker	
1996	Get on the Bus	Randall	
1997	Chicago Cab	Pissed-Off Boyfriend	Credited as Harry J. Lennix
1999	The Unspoken	Reverend Bob	
1999	Titus	Aaron	
2000	Love & Basketball	Nathan Wright	
2000	The Artist's Journey: Funk Blast	The Guide	
2000	All or Nothing	Jackson	Short
2000	American Temp	Fred Caesar	Short
2001	Home Invaders	Himself	
2002	Pumpkin	Robert Meary	
2002	Collateral Damage	FBI Agent Dray	
2002	Don't Explain	Lee	
2002	Never Get Outta the Boat	Brandon	Credited as Harry J. Lennix
2003	Black Listed	Karl Bennett	Short
2003	The Matrix Reloaded	Commander Lock	
2003	The Human Stain	Mr. Silk	
2003	The Matrix Revolutions	Lock	
2004	Chrystal	Kalid	
2004	Barbershop 2: Back in Business	Quentin Leroux	
2004	Suspect Zero	Rich Charleton	
2004	Ray	Joe Adams	
2005	Trespass	Daddy	Short
2006	Shariff Don't Like It	Tom	
2007	Stomp the Yard	Nate	
2007	Resurrecting the Champ	Bob Satterfield Jr.	
2007	Across the Universe	Army Sergaent	
2008	Fly Like Mercury	Coach	
2009	State of Play	Detective Bell	
2009	The Interview	Draco	Short
2012	The Last Fall	Ron Davis	
2012	H4	King Henry IV	
2012	A Beautiful Soul	Jeff Freeze	
2013	Evidence	Ben Tuttle	
2013	Man of Steel	General Calvin Swanwick	
2013	They Die by Dawn	Sheriff Bass Reeves	
2013	Sunny and RayRay	Lenotti	
2013	Keep Pushing	Staff Sergeant Hoover	Short
2013	Mr. Sophistication	Ron Waters	Also producer
2014	Cruel Will	Dr. Frances	
2014	Cru	Diego Glass	
2014	The Algerian	Suleyman	
2014	Stand Down Soldier	Officer Freeman	
2015	Justice League: Throne of Atlantis	Black Manta (voice)	Direct-to-video
2015	72 Hours	God	
2015	Back to School Mom	Lawrence Riley	
2015	Chi-Raq	Commissioner Blades	
2016	Batman v Superman: Dawn of Justice	Secretary of State Calvin Swanwick	
2016	Macbeth Unhinged	Banquo	
2016	Timeless	Johnson	
2016	For the Love of Christmas	God	
2016	Retribution	Captain Tucker	
2016	Alternate Universe: A Rescue Mission	Principal Sheehan	
2017	Needlestick	Ray LeGro	
2017	Romeo and Juliet in Harlem	Capulet	
2018	That's Harassment	Politician	Short
2018	Rehabilition of the Hill	Davidson Livingston	
2018	Canal Street	DJ Terrance Palmer	
2018	Revival	Pilate	
2020	Grey Streets	Cardinal Ford	Short
2020	Emperor	Frederick Douglass	
2020	Lazaretto	Sufyan	Short
2021	Zack Snyder's Justice League	Calvin Swanwick / Martian Manhunter	Director's cut of Justice League
2021	The Almighty Street Team	Calvin James / Black Aizan	
2022	Super Turnt	Mr. Denver	
2022	Winter Ball	Eddie	
2022	Curse of the Macbeths	Banquo	
2022	Nothing is Impossible	Russell Banks	
2024	Cutting Squares	Johnson / Self	
2024	Isla Monstro	General Dregg	
2024	Godless	Bishop Rolland	
TBA	L.A. 4ORCE †	Chi-town Harry	Post-production
TBA	Eyes in the Trees †	Dr. Murphy	Post-production

Key
†	Denotes films that have not yet been released

=== Television ===
Year	Title	Role	Notes
1986	Jack and Mike	Fraternity Brother	Episode: "Personal Foul"
1989	A Mother's Courage: The Mary Thomas Story	Nero	Television film
1990	Perry Mason: The Case of the Defiant Daughter	Prosecutor Keith Warner	Television film
1992	In the Best Interest of the Children	Tim Coffey	Television film
1994	Vanishing Son 2	Andre Laine	Television film
1994	Vanishing Son 4	Andre Laine	Television film
1995–1996	The Client	Daniel Holbrook	Recurring role
1996	The Parent 'Hood	Sergeant Rutledge	Episode: "Goodfella"
1996	Murder One	David Bronson	Episode: "Chapter Eleven"
1997	Murder One	Mr. Parnell	Episode: "Chapter Ten, Year Two"
1997	Friends 'Til the End	Prof. Gunderson	Television film
1997	Too Close to Home	Prosecuting Attorney	Television film
1997	Living Single	Clayton Simmons	Episode: "The Best Laid Plans"
1997	ER	Dr. Greg Fischer	Recurring role
1997–1998	Diagnosis: Murder	Agent Ron Wagner	Recurring role
1998	Ally McBeal	Ballard	Episode: "The Blame Game"
1998	Since You've Been Gone	Jordan Cardozo	Television film
1998	Any Day Now	Garrett	Episode: "Unfinished Symphony"
1998 & 2003	The Practice	Attorney Wayland Holmes; Asst. Attorney General Parker	Episodes: "The Pursuit of Dignity" & "Final Judgment"
1999	Judging Amy	Mr. Newman	Episode: "An Impartial Bias"
1999	JAG	Agent John Nichols	Episode: "Contemptuous Words"
1999	St. Michael's Crossing	Pasternak	Episode: "CBS Pilot Knockin' on Heaven's Door"
2002	Keep the Faith, Baby	Adam Clayton Powell Jr.	Television film
2002	Girlfriends	Earl	Episode: "My Mother, Myself"
2003	The Handler	DEA Handler	Episode: "Street Boss"
2004	Century City	Attorney Attwell	Episode: "Love and Games"
2004	Second Time Around	Dr. Oakes	Episode: "For Better or Worse"
2005	House	John Henry Giles	Episode: "DNR"
2005–2006	Commander in Chief	Jim Gardner	Main role
2006	Legion of Super Heroes	Mar Londo (voice)	Episode: "Timber Wolf"
2007	24	Walid Al-Rezani	Recurring role
2008	Little Britain USA	President of the United States	Recurring role
2009–2010	Dollhouse	Boyd Langton	Main role
2010	Undercovers	Gary Bloom	Episode: "Funny Money"
2011	Law & Order: LA	Agent Bossy	Episode: "Plummer Park"
2011	Hound Dogs	Skip	Television film
2012–2013	Emily Owens, M.D.	Dr. Tim Dupre	Recurring role
2013	Always Night	Roger Banks	Miniseries
2013	Quick Draw	Sheriff Matt Love	Episode: "Nicodemus"
2013–2023	The Blacklist	Harold Cooper	Main role
2014	The Fright Night Files	Ronald	Television film
2015	The Marriage Tour	Mr. Wright	Recurring role
2016–2023	Billions	Frank Sacker / Franklin Sacker	Recurring role
2017	The Blacklist: Redemption	Harold Cooper	Episode: "Whitehall"
2017	Transformers: Robots in Disguise	Cyclonus, Galvatronus (voice)	Episodes: "Enemy of My Enemy" & "Freedom Fighters"
2018–2020	Conrad	Don Brewer	Episodes: "Hangin' with Conrad" & "Pilot D.O.A"
2018–2021	Insecure	Marcus Walker	Guest; (season 3), recurring role; (season 5)
2021	A Christmas Together with You	Frank Emory	Television film
2022	American Masters	Orpheus Fisher (voice)	Episode: "Marian Anderson: The Whole World in Her Hands"
2022	Army of the Dead: Lost Vegas	Boorman	Voice
2024	Destination Heaven	God the Father	Miniseries
2024	Diarra from Detroit	Walter Harley	Recurring role
2024	Young Love	Russell Young (voice)	Recurring role
2026	Boston Blue	Judge Elijah Robinson	Recurring role
2026	The Bear	James Brooks	Episode: "Caramel"

=== Theater ===
Year	Title	Role	Venue	Ref.
1989	The Meeting	Malcolm X	Chicago Theatre Company	
1991	The Great Gatsby	Jay Gatsby	Wisdom Bridge Theatre, Chicago	
1994	Titus Andronicus	Aaron	St. Clements Theater, New York	
1997	The Meeting	Malcolm X	Goodman Theatre, Chicago	
1997	Ma Rainey's Black Bottom	Levee	Goodman Theatre, Chicago	
2000	A Raisin in the Sun	Walter Lee Younger	Goodman Theatre, Chicago	
2001	Cymbeline	Iachimo	Royal Shakespeare Company	
2005	Permanent Collection	Sterling North	Northlight Theatre Company	
2007	Radio Golf	Harmond Wilks	Cort Theatre, Broadway	
2016	A Small Oak Tree Runs Red	(Director)	Congo Square Theatre, Chicago	
2007	Macbeth		Los Angeles	
2024	How I Learned What I Learned	August Wilson	Goodman Theatre, Chicago	
2024	Inherit the Wind	Henry Drummond	Goodman Theatre, Chicago	
2024	Macbeth		Jardim Botânico de Lisboa, Portugal	
2024	Purpose	Solomon "Sonny" Jasper	Steppenwolf, Chicago	
2025	Purpose	Solomon "Sonny" Jasper	Hayes Theater, Broadway	
2026	The Taming of the Shrew	Petruchio	Unicorn Factory, Portugal	
2026	Ma Rainey's Black Bottom	(Musical Director)	Goodman Theatre, Chicago	

=== Video games ===
Year	Title	Voice role	Notes
2003	Enter the Matrix	Commander Jason Lock	Voice acting and full-motion video cutscenes
2004	The Matrix Online	Commander Jason Lock	Voice acting

=== Radio ===
Year	Title	Role	Ref.
2024	The Last Days of Cabrini-Green	Himself	Podcast series

== Awards and nominations ==
The Chicago Crusader and Northwestern University called Lennix, "one of Chicago's favorite sons."

Year	Awards	Category	Recipient	Outcome
2000	Satellite Awards	Best Supporting Actor – Motion Picture	Titus	Won
2003	Black Reel Awards	Best Actor in a Television Movie/Miniseries	Keep the Faith, Baby	Won
2003	NAACP Image Awards	Outstanding Actor in a Television Movie, Miniseries or Dramatic Special	Keep the Faith, Baby	Nominated
2003	Satellite Awards	Best Actor – Miniseries or Television Film	Keep the Faith, Baby	Nominated
2006	NAACP Image Awards	Outstanding Supporting Actor in a Drama Series	Commander in Chief	Nominated
2025	Tony Award	Best Actor in a Play	Purpose	Nominated
