= Coppélia Kahn =

American academic, Shakespeare scholar, and writer

Coppélia Huber Kahn (born 1939) is Professor Emerita of English and Gender Studies at Brown University and an internationally recognized Shakespeare scholar. She is best known for her work on feminist and gender studies in the wider field of Shakespeare studies, and was among the first to bring these lenses to bear on the field. Kahn is the author of Roman Shakespeare: Warriors, Wounds, and Women.

== Personal life and education ==
Kahn was born in 1939 in Seattle. Her parents were Louis Reichert, a journalist, and Hazel Huber (née Ferguson), a housewife. She married Judd Kahn on December 26, 1963, but they were divorced on October 1, 1982. She married Avi Wortis on June 21, 1986. Kahn has one child (a son).

Kahn graduated BA with honors from Barnard College in 1961. (Note: Kahn won a scholarship to Barnard College from the Seven College Conference Scholarship Program. The Conference each year makes scholarships available to girls in 14 states in the western US. The program's Field Director travels extensively in these states to make schools and students familiar with the program and the colleges participating in it.) She took her MA degree in 1964 and PhD in 1970, both at the University of California, Berkeley.

== Career history ==
Kahn started her career in the English department at the University of California, Berkeley where she held roles as a teaching assistant, acting instructor, and lecturer between 1962 and 1972 while working on her MA and PhD. In 1972 she moved to the English department at Wesleyan University where she held positions as assistant professor (1972–1978), associate professor (1978–1985), and full professor (1985–1987). Since 1987 she has been a professor (currently Emerita) in the English department at Brown University.

In the fall of 1983 she was a visiting associate professor at Yale University; in 1986–1987 a visiting professor at UCLA; and in April–May 1996 a visiting professor at the Università degli Studi di Torino.

== Sources ==
- "Coppelia Kahn". Contemporary Authors Online. Gale Research. 2002 – via Biography in Context.
- "Coppelia Kahn". Directory of American Scholars. Gale Research. 2002 – via Biography in Context.
- Kahn, Coppelia (n.d.). "Coppelia Kahn". Researchers@Brown. Brown University.
- "Person, Place and Thing". Vassar Quarterly. Vol. XLVIII, no. 2. Vassar College. December 1, 1962.
