= Menschenliebe =

- Directed by: Alexander Tuschinski
- Written by: Alexander Tuschinski
- Produced by: Alexander Tuschinski
- Starring: Sebastian B Alexander Tuschinski; Dominic Rödel; Marc Ortner; Tonie Redford; Nadja Schneider
- Cinematography: Alexander Tuschinski; Matthias Kirste; Joachim Sommer
- Edited by: Alexander Tuschinski
- Release date: 2010
- Running time: 78 minutes (at 24fps)
- Country: Germany
- Language: German

Menschenliebe is an independent German feature film directed by Alexander Tuschinski. It had its premiere in Stuttgart, Germany in December 2010. It was screened and received numerous awards at international film-festivals, was additionally shown in various cinemas and screening events in Germany, and was officially released online in June 2013 on YouTube and Vimeo.

== Plot ==
The film is about a young physics-student, Arnold Richter, who loves classical music - especially Mozart's opera Don Giovanni. Being a shy introvert, he has no luck finding a girlfriend. One day, he meets a man reminiscent of Don Giovanni. His new mentor teaches him how to seduce any woman in two minutes - but the more Arnold follows his advice, the more surreal his world becomes.

=== Overview ===
The film is regarded as a Low-Budget-Film, as all participants were involved voluntarily without compensation. The cast comprises 46 actors, most of whom were first-time performers. Alexander Tuschinski produced the film independently while studying at Hochschule der Medien, Stuttgart.

== Awards ==
The film won the following awards:

- Gold Medal for Excellence: Park City Film Music Festival 2010.
- Best Foreign Film: Nevada International Film Festival 2011.
- Special Jury Award: Honolulu Film Awards 2012.
