= Stuttgart II (electoral district) =

Federal electoral district of Germany

259 Stuttgart 2
- Electoral district for the Bundestag
- Stuttgart II in 2025
- State: Baden-Württemberg
- Population: 325,100 (2019)
- Electorate: 174,909 (2025)
- Major settlements: Stuttgart (partial)
- Area: 93.6 km^{2}

Current electoral district
- Created: 1949
- Member: Vacant
- Elected: 2025

Stuttgart 2 is an electoral constituency (German: Wahlkreis) formerly represented automatically in the Bundestag. It used to elect one member via first-past-the-post voting. Under the current constituency numbering system, it is designated as constituency 259. It is located in central Baden-Württemberg, comprising the northern part of the city of Stuttgart.

Stuttgart II was created for the inaugural 1949 federal election. Whilst the Christian Democratic Union won a 31.6% plurality in the 2025 election, which earned them 29 seats, they won 35 of 38 (92%) of the constituencies in the state. Under the new voting system, this candidate and constituency was among the 6 who did not actually win a seat in the Bundestag. This was due to the distribution of seats among the winning CDU candidates being decided by the first (direct) vote percentage of each winning CDU candidate, determining who took the seats. As this CDU candidate got a vote (30.4%) at the lower end of the results of CDU candidates, this seat and five others will remain vacant throughout the 21st Bundestag.

== Geography ==
Stuttgart II is located in central Baden-Württemberg. As of the 2021 federal election, it comprises the Stadtbezirke of Bad Cannstatt, Botnang, Feuerbach, Mühlhausen, Münster, Obertürkheim, Stammheim, Stuttgart-Ost, Untertürkheim, Wangen, Weilimdorf, and Zuffenhausen from the independent city of Stuttgart.

== History ==
Stuttgart II was created in 1949. In the 1980 through 1998 elections, it was named Stuttgart-Nord. In the 1949 election, it was Württemberg-Baden Landesbezirk Württemberg constituency 2 in the numbering system. In the 1953 through 1961 elections, it was number 164. In the 1965 through 1976 elections, it was number 165. In the 1980 through 1998 elections, it was number 163. In the 2002 and 2005 elections, it was number 260. Since the 2009 election, it has been number 259.

Originally, the constituency comprised the Stadtteile of Stuttgart-Ost, Stuttgart-Nord, Bad Cannstatt, Stammheim, Zuffenhausen, Mühlhausen, Hofen, Münster, Untertürkheim, Rotenberg, Uhlbach, Wangen, Obertürkheim, Rohracker, Hedelfingen, Sillenbuch, Heumaden, and Riedenberg from the independent city of Stuttgart. In the 1965 through 1976 elections, it comprised the Stadtteile of Stuttgart-Mitte, Stuttgart-Ost, Stuttgart-Nord, Birkach, Hedelfingen, Untertürkheim, Obertürkheim, Plieningen, Sillenbuch, and Wangen. It acquired its current borders in the 1980 election.

Election	No.	Name	Borders
1949	2	Stuttgart II	Stuttgart city (only Stuttgart-Ost, Stuttgart-Nord, Bad Cannstatt, Stammheim, Zuffenhausen, Mühlhausen, Hofen, Münster, Untertürkheim, Rotenberg, Uhlbach, Wangen, Obertürkheim, Rohracker, Hedelfingen, Sillenbuch, Heumaden, and Riedenberg Stadtteile)
1953	164	Stuttgart II	Stuttgart city (only Stuttgart-Ost, Stuttgart-Nord, Bad Cannstatt, Stammheim, Zuffenhausen, Mühlhausen, Hofen, Münster, Untertürkheim, Rotenberg, Uhlbach, Wangen, Obertürkheim, Rohracker, Hedelfingen, Sillenbuch, Heumaden, and Riedenberg Stadtteile)
1957	164	Stuttgart II	Stuttgart city (only Stuttgart-Ost, Stuttgart-Nord, Bad Cannstatt, Stammheim, Zuffenhausen, Mühlhausen, Hofen, Münster, Untertürkheim, Rotenberg, Uhlbach, Wangen, Obertürkheim, Rohracker, Hedelfingen, Sillenbuch, Heumaden, and Riedenberg Stadtteile)
1961	164	Stuttgart II	Stuttgart city (only Stuttgart-Ost, Stuttgart-Nord, Bad Cannstatt, Stammheim, Zuffenhausen, Mühlhausen, Hofen, Münster, Untertürkheim, Rotenberg, Uhlbach, Wangen, Obertürkheim, Rohracker, Hedelfingen, Sillenbuch, Heumaden, and Riedenberg Stadtteile)
1965	165	Stuttgart II	Stuttgart city (only Stuttgart-Mitte, Stuttgart-Ost, Stuttgart-Nord, Birkach, Hedelfingen, Untertürkheim, Obertürkheim, Plieningen, Sillenbuch, and Wangen Stadtteile)
1969	165	Stuttgart II	Stuttgart city (only Stuttgart-Mitte, Stuttgart-Ost, Stuttgart-Nord, Birkach, Hedelfingen, Untertürkheim, Obertürkheim, Plieningen, Sillenbuch, and Wangen Stadtteile)
1972	165	Stuttgart II	Stuttgart city (only Stuttgart-Mitte, Stuttgart-Ost, Stuttgart-Nord, Birkach, Hedelfingen, Untertürkheim, Obertürkheim, Plieningen, Sillenbuch, and Wangen Stadtteile)
1976	165	Stuttgart II	Stuttgart city (only Stuttgart-Mitte, Stuttgart-Ost, Stuttgart-Nord, Birkach, Hedelfingen, Untertürkheim, Obertürkheim, Plieningen, Sillenbuch, and Wangen Stadtteile)
1980	163	Stuttgart-Nord	Stuttgart city (only Bad Cannstatt, Botnang, Feuerbach, Mühlhausen, Münster, Obertürkheim, Stammheim, Stuttgart-Ost, Untertürkheim, Wangen, Weilimdorf, and Zuffenhausen Stadtbezirke)
1983	163	Stuttgart-Nord	Stuttgart city (only Bad Cannstatt, Botnang, Feuerbach, Mühlhausen, Münster, Obertürkheim, Stammheim, Stuttgart-Ost, Untertürkheim, Wangen, Weilimdorf, and Zuffenhausen Stadtbezirke)
1987	163	Stuttgart-Nord	Stuttgart city (only Bad Cannstatt, Botnang, Feuerbach, Mühlhausen, Münster, Obertürkheim, Stammheim, Stuttgart-Ost, Untertürkheim, Wangen, Weilimdorf, and Zuffenhausen Stadtbezirke)
1990	163	Stuttgart-Nord	Stuttgart city (only Bad Cannstatt, Botnang, Feuerbach, Mühlhausen, Münster, Obertürkheim, Stammheim, Stuttgart-Ost, Untertürkheim, Wangen, Weilimdorf, and Zuffenhausen Stadtbezirke)
1994	163	Stuttgart-Nord	Stuttgart city (only Bad Cannstatt, Botnang, Feuerbach, Mühlhausen, Münster, Obertürkheim, Stammheim, Stuttgart-Ost, Untertürkheim, Wangen, Weilimdorf, and Zuffenhausen Stadtbezirke)
1998	163	Stuttgart-Nord	Stuttgart city (only Bad Cannstatt, Botnang, Feuerbach, Mühlhausen, Münster, Obertürkheim, Stammheim, Stuttgart-Ost, Untertürkheim, Wangen, Weilimdorf, and Zuffenhausen Stadtbezirke)
2002	260	Stuttgart II	Stuttgart city (only Bad Cannstatt, Botnang, Feuerbach, Mühlhausen, Münster, Obertürkheim, Stammheim, Stuttgart-Ost, Untertürkheim, Wangen, Weilimdorf, and Zuffenhausen Stadtbezirke)
2005	260	Stuttgart II	Stuttgart city (only Bad Cannstatt, Botnang, Feuerbach, Mühlhausen, Münster, Obertürkheim, Stammheim, Stuttgart-Ost, Untertürkheim, Wangen, Weilimdorf, and Zuffenhausen Stadtbezirke)
2009	259	Stuttgart II	Stuttgart city (only Bad Cannstatt, Botnang, Feuerbach, Mühlhausen, Münster, Obertürkheim, Stammheim, Stuttgart-Ost, Untertürkheim, Wangen, Weilimdorf, and Zuffenhausen Stadtbezirke)
2013	259	Stuttgart II	Stuttgart city (only Bad Cannstatt, Botnang, Feuerbach, Mühlhausen, Münster, Obertürkheim, Stammheim, Stuttgart-Ost, Untertürkheim, Wangen, Weilimdorf, and Zuffenhausen Stadtbezirke)
2017	259	Stuttgart II	Stuttgart city (only Bad Cannstatt, Botnang, Feuerbach, Mühlhausen, Münster, Obertürkheim, Stammheim, Stuttgart-Ost, Untertürkheim, Wangen, Weilimdorf, and Zuffenhausen Stadtbezirke)
2021	259	Stuttgart II	Stuttgart city (only Bad Cannstatt, Botnang, Feuerbach, Mühlhausen, Münster, Obertürkheim, Stammheim, Stuttgart-Ost, Untertürkheim, Wangen, Weilimdorf, and Zuffenhausen Stadtbezirke)
2025	259	Stuttgart II	Stuttgart city (only Bad Cannstatt, Botnang, Feuerbach, Mühlhausen, Münster, Obertürkheim, Stammheim, Stuttgart-Ost, Untertürkheim, Wangen, Weilimdorf, and Zuffenhausen Stadtbezirke)

== Members ==
The constituency was first represented by Erwin Schoettle of the Social Democratic Party (SPD) from 1949 to 1953. Erwin Häussler won it for the Christian Democratic Union (CDU) in 1953 and served two terms before former member Schoettle regained it in 1961. He was succeeded by fellow SPD member Ernst Haar from 1965 to 1980, followed by Peter Conradi from 1980 to 1983. Herbert Czaja of the CDU was elected in 1983 and served until 1990. Erika Reinhardt of the CDU served two terms before Ute Kumpf of the SPD won the constituency in 1998. She was representative until 2009. Karin Maag served until 2021. She was succeeded by fellow CDU member Maximilian Mörseburg. Since the 2025 election, there is no automatic seat allocated to winning a constituency.

Election	Member	Party	%
1949	Erwin Schoettle	SPD	33.1
1953	Erwin Häussler	CDU	33.3
1957	Erwin Häussler	CDU	39.6
1961	Erwin Schoettle	SPD	43.1
1965	Ernst Haar	SPD	40.8
1969	Ernst Haar	SPD	48.4
1972	Ernst Haar	SPD	51.2
1976	Ernst Haar	SPD	44.9
1980	Peter Conradi	SPD	47.9
1983	Herbert Czaja	CDU	46.3
1987	Herbert Czaja	CDU	41.0
1990	Erika Reinhardt	CDU	40.6
1994	Erika Reinhardt	CDU	42.8
1998	Ute Kumpf	SPD	43.3
2002	Ute Kumpf	SPD	45.6
2005	Ute Kumpf	SPD	42.1
2009	Karin Maag	CDU	34.5
2013	Karin Maag	CDU	43.8
2017	Karin Maag	CDU	33.5
2021	Maximilian Mörseburg	CDU	25.9
2025	Vacant (Note: Maximilian Mörseburg (CDU) won with 30.4% but seat remained vacant due to insufficient second votes cover.)		

== Election results ==
=== 2025 election ===
This constituency is among those not represented in Berlin since 2025. Under the new voting system implemented for the 2025 election to fix the number of seats at 630, although the CDU candidate won the most votes in this constituency, due to the low winning percentage compared to several other CDU members winning constituencies, this constituency seat is among the six in the state remaining vacant as not enough second (party) votes were won nationwide and statewide by CDU to be allocated this seat, too. In addition, none of the candidates were ranked high enough on their party list to win a seat.

Federal election (2025): Stuttgart II
Notes:	Blue background denotes the winner of the electorate vote. Pink background denotes a candidate elected from their party list. Yellow background denotes an electorate win by a list member, or other incumbent. A ✓ or ✗ denotes status of any incumbent, win or lose respectively.						
Party	Candidate	Votes	%	±%	Party votes	%	±%
CDU	Maximilian Mörseburg	42,059	30.4	▲4.5	37,214	26.8	▲5.4
Greens	Anna Christmann	29,438	21.3	▼2.5	24,215	17.4	▼3.8
SPD	Dietmar Richard Bulat	22,055	15.9	▼4.6	22,564	16.2	▼6.5
AfD	Dr. Michael Hans Mayer	20,165	14.6	▲7.3	19,979	14.4	▲7.2
Left	Aynur Karlikli	12,414	9.0	▲4.2	15,095	10.9	▲5.8
FDP	Mark Julian Wieczorrek	5,789	4.2	▼6.9	8,085	5.8	▼9.5
BSW					6,710	4.8	
Volt	Markus Abele-Reichle	2,200	1.6	▲1.0	1,423	1.0	▲0.6
FW	Sylvia Inez Rolke	1,789	1.3	▼0.1	975	0.7	▼0.2
APT					986	0.7	▼0.3
PARTEI	Franz Xaver Lallinger	1,657	1.2	▼0.1	692	0.5	▼0.4
Independent	Erkan Demir	587	0.4				
dieBasis					351	0.3	▼0.9
ÖDP					219	0.2	▼0.1
BD					151	0.1	
MLPD	Petra Braun	344	0.2	▲0.1	145	0.1	Steady
Bündnis C					138	0.1	Steady
Informal votes		1,076			631		
Total valid votes		138,497			138,942		
Turnout		139,573	79.8	▲5.1			
Vacant gain from CDU	Majority						

=== 2021 election ===
Federal election (2021): Stuttgart II
Notes:	Blue background denotes the winner of the electorate vote. Pink background denotes a candidate elected from their party list. Yellow background denotes an electorate win by a list member, or other incumbent. A ✓ or ✗ denotes status of any incumbent, win or lose respectively.						
Party	Candidate	Votes	%	±%	Party votes	%	±%
CDU	Maximilian Mörseburg	34,312	25.9	▼7.6	28,403	21.4	▼7.7
Greens	Anna Christmann	31,446	23.7	▲7.9	28,221	21.3	▲6.0
SPD	Dejan Perc	27,224	20.5	▲2.1	30,198	22.8	▲5.8
FDP	Timur Lutfullin	14,678	11.1	▲2.4	20,273	15.3	▲1.4
AfD	Michael Mayer	9,603	7.2	▼3.2	9,541	7.2	▼3.6
Left	Johanna Tiarks	6,294	4.8	▼4.2	6,739	5.1	▼4.0
FW	Ralf Wendel	1,833	1.4		1,206	0.9	▲0.5
dieBasis	Thomas Kucher	1,778	1.3		1,589	1.2	
Team Todenhöfer					1,446	1.1	
Tierschutzpartei	Matthias Gottfried	1,763	1.3	0.0	1,368	1.0	▲0.1
PARTEI	Fabian Westenberg	1,674	1.3	▲0.1	1,216	0.9	▼0.1
Volt	Jan König	732	0.6		589	0.4	
Pirates					571	0.4	▼0.3
Independent	Erkan Demir	373	0.3				
ÖDP					293	0.2	▼0.1
Bürgerbewegung	René Greiner	317	0.2		193	0.1	
Humanists	Konstantin Ksensow	220	0.2		163	0.1	
Bündnis C					153	0.1	
MLPD	Volker Kraft	189	0.1	▼0.1	142	0.1	▼0.1
DiB					119	0.1	▼0.1
Gesundheitsforschung					97	0.1	
NPD					64	0.0	▼0.1
DKP					58	0.0	0.0
Bündnis 21					35	0.0	
BüSo	Christoph Mohs	28	0.0	▼0.1			
LKR					19	0.0	
Informal votes		1,124			892		
Total valid votes		132,464			132,696		
Turnout		133,588	74.6	▼1.6			
CDU hold	Majority	2,866	2.2	▼12.8			

=== 2017 election ===
Federal election (2017): Stuttgart II
Notes:	Blue background denotes the winner of the electorate vote. Pink background denotes a candidate elected from their party list. Yellow background denotes an electorate win by a list member, or other incumbent. A ✓ or ✗ denotes status of any incumbent, win or lose respectively.						
Party	Candidate	Votes	%	±%	Party votes	%	±%
CDU	✓ Karin Maag	46,166	33.5	▼10.3	40,109	29.1	▼10.3
SPD	Michael Jantzer	25,469	18.5	▼7.6	23,458	17.0	▼5.9
Greens	Anna Christmann	21,850	15.9	▲1.9	21,071	15.3	▲1.5
AfD	Lothar Maier	14,345	10.4	▲7.0	14,899	10.8	▲6.2
Left	Bernd Riexinger	12,321	8.9	▲3.9	12,553	9.1	▲2.4
FDP	Volker Weil	11,903	8.6	▲5.9	19,210	13.9	▲7.2
Tierschutzpartei	Matthias Gottfried	1,807	1.3		1,286	0.9	▲0.3
PARTEI	Ina Schumann	1,549	1.1		1,394	1.0	
Pirates	Harald Hermann	1,354	1.0	▼1.3	991	0.7	▼1.9
FW					561	0.4	▼0.1
ÖDP	Dieter Zielke	613	0.4		444	0.3	0.0
BGE					403	0.3	
DM					307	0.2	
DiB					284	0.2	
Tierschutzallianz					254	0.2	
MLPD	Volker Kraft	347	0.3	0.0	253	0.2	0.0
NPD					181	0.1	▼0.5
V-Partei³					150	0.1	
Menschliche Welt					149	0.1	
BüSo	Christoph Mohs	113	0.1	0.0			
DKP					43	0.0	
DIE RECHTE					27	0.0	
Informal votes		1,343			1,153		
Total valid votes		137,837			138,027		
Turnout		139,180	76.3	▲2.9			
CDU hold	Majority	20,697	15.0	▼2.7			

=== 2013 election ===
Federal election (2013): Stuttgart II
Notes:	Blue background denotes the winner of the electorate vote. Pink background denotes a candidate elected from their party list. Yellow background denotes an electorate win by a list member, or other incumbent. A ✓ or ✗ denotes status of any incumbent, win or lose respectively.						
Party	Candidate	Votes	%	±%	Party votes	%	±%
CDU	✓ Karin Maag	58,222	43.8	▲9.3	52,323	39.3	▲10.2
SPD	Nicolas Schäfstoß	34,690	26.1	▼0.2	30,469	22.9	▲2.0
Greens	Birgitt Bender	18,505	13.9	▼2.9	18,341	13.8	▼4.2
Left	Marta Aparicio de Eckelmann	6,633	5.0	▼3.6	8,902	6.7	▼2.3
AfD	Eberhard Brett	4,497	3.4		6,047	4.5	
FDP	Matthias Werwigk	3,594	2.7	▼7.7	8,920	6.7	▼10.6
Pirates	Jürgen Martin	3,064	2.3	▲0.8	3,460	2.6	▲0.6
Tierschutzpartei					846	0.6	0.0
FW	Jörg Stimpfig	1,203	0.9		732	0.6	
NPD	Lutz Schernau	1,074	0.8	▼0.5	799	0.6	▼0.2
Independent	Carola Eckstein	951	0.7				
REP					479	0.4	▼0.7
ÖDP					382	0.3	▼0.1
RENTNER					367	0.3	
BIG					255	0.2	
MLPD	Volker Kraft	281	0.2	0.0	219	0.2	0.0
Volksabstimmung					153	0.1	▼0.1
PBC					135	0.1	▼0.1
Party of Reason					84	0.1	
PRO					84	0.1	
BüSo	Stephan Ossenkopp	121	0.1	▼0.2	44	0.0	▼0.1
Informal votes		1,520			1,314		
Total valid votes		132,835			133,041		
Turnout		134,355	73.4	▲2.0			
CDU hold	Majority	23,532	17.7	▲9.5			

=== 2009 election ===
Federal election (2009): Stuttgart II
Notes:	Blue background denotes the winner of the electorate vote. Pink background denotes a candidate elected from their party list. Yellow background denotes an electorate win by a list member, or other incumbent. A ✓ or ✗ denotes status of any incumbent, win or lose respectively.						
Party	Candidate	Votes	%	±%	Party votes	%	±%
CDU	Karin Maag	44,002	34.5	▼5.2	37,151	29.1	▼3.9
SPD	✗ Ute Kumpf	33,525	26.3	▼15.8	26,675	20.9	▼13.0
Greens	Birgitt Bender	21,453	16.8	▲10.2	22,916	17.9	▲5.3
FDP	Marion Heß	13,327	10.5	▲6.2	22,059	17.3	▲5.4
Left	Ulrich Maurer	10,902	8.6	▲3.8	11,437	9.0	▲4.1
Pirates	Norbert Welk	1,893	1.5		2,616	2.0	
REP					1,365	1.1	▼0.1
NPD	Ulrich Schwarz	1,673	1.3	▲0.1	999	0.8	0.0
Tierschutzpartei					756	0.6	
ÖDP					444	0.3	
DIE VIOLETTEN					336	0.3	
PBC					263	0.2	▼0.1
BüSo	Lüder Grosser	373	0.3	▲0.1	128	0.1	0.0
MLPD	Volker Kraft	322	0.3	0.0	253	0.2	0.0
Volksabstimmung					217	0.2	
DVU					62	0.0	
ADM					43	0.0	
Informal votes		1,789			1,539		
Total valid votes		127,470			127,720		
Turnout		129,259	71.4	▼5.8			
CDU gain from SPD	Majority	10,477	8.2				

=== 2005 election ===
Federal election (2005): Stuttgart II
Notes:	Blue background denotes the winner of the electorate vote. Pink background denotes a candidate elected from their party list. Yellow background denotes an electorate win by a list member, or other incumbent. A ✓ or ✗ denotes status of any incumbent, win or lose respectively.						
Party	Candidate	Votes	%	±%	Party votes	%	±%
SPD	✓ Ute Kumpf	57,524	42.1	▼3.5	46,334	33.9	▼3.7
CDU	Angela Schmid	54,297	39.7	▲1.0	45,045	33.0	▼3.3
Greens	Birgitt Bender	9,089	6.6	▼0.7	17,241	12.6	▼0.7
Left	Ulrich Maurer	6,448	4.7	▲3.6	6,611	4.8	▲3.4
FDP	Albert Cuntze	5,839	4.3	▼1.6	16,250	11.9	▲4.2
NPD	Alexander Neidlein	1,616	1.2		1,113	0.8	▲0.6
REP					1,532	1.1	▼0.2
GRAUEN	Uwe Göhring	1,227	0.9	▲0.1	1,102	0.8	▲0.5
Familie					624	0.5	
MLPD	Volker Kraft	376	0.3		302	0.2	
PBC					359	0.3	
BüSo					146	0.1	▲0.1
Informal votes		1,879			1,924		
Total valid votes		136,704			136,659		
Turnout		138,583	77.2	▼2.3			
SPD hold	Majority	3,227	2.4				
