= Stuttgart-Feuerbach =

Feuerbach
- Borough of Stuttgart
- Coat of arms

- Location of Feuerbach within Stuttgart
- Interactive map of Feuerbach
- Location within Germany Location within Baden-Württemberg
- Coordinates: 48°49′N 9°9′E
- Country: Germany
- State: Baden-Württemberg
- Admin. region: Stuttgart
- District: Urban district
- City: Stuttgart

Area
  - Total: 11.5 km^{2} (4.4 sq mi)
- Elevation: 292 m (958 ft)

Population (2020-12-31)
  - Total: 29,929
  - Density: 2,600/km^{2} (6,740/sq mi)
- Time zone: UTC+01:00 (CET)
  - Summer (DST): UTC+02:00 (CEST)
- Postal codes: 70469, 70499
- Dialling codes: 0711
- Vehicle registration: S
- Website: www.stuttgart.de

Feuerbach (German pronunciation: [ˈfɔʏɐbax]) is a borough (Stadtbezirk) of the city of Stuttgart. Its name is derived from the small river of the same name that flows from the neighboring district of Botnang through Feuerbach. Feuerbach is home to one of Germany's biggest industrial giants and is surrounded by the districts of Zuffenhausen, Bad Cannstatt, Stuttgart-North, Stuttgart-West, Botnang and Weilimdorf.

== History ==
The remains of a prehistoric settlement were uncovered in 1904, when the pastor of Feuerbach, Richard Kallee excavated, archeologically documented and published a total of 102 Alemannic sandstone tombs and cists. Together with his helpers he took great care to recover 760 artifacts from these Alemannic graves: skulls and bones, coins, pottery shards, combs, necklaces, belts, locks, swords, spears, arrows and spores, which he researched and published to the end of his life. These are now exhibited in the foyer of the district town hall of Feuerbach.

The first recorded mention of Feuerbach was in the annals of Hirsau Abbey in 1075 although the name used at the time was Biberbach. This name translates literally as 'beaver-brook', a reference to beavers in Feuerbach valley. The beaver still features on the town's coat of arms today - alongside a cog representing its modern industrial nature and the large number of factories in the area. Later the community was called Fürbach, which then developed by the end of the 16th century into the name used today.

Until 1860 Feuerbach was mainly a rural community outside the larger city of Stuttgart. As well as traditional farming, the area housed a large number of vineyards. The Killesberg area included a number of stone quarries - with many of the sheer rock faces in this area still visible to this day. In 1848 the first railway tunnel was built between Stuttgart and Feuerbach, marking the advent of rapid industrial development in the area. Among others this involved the Robert Bosch company, which built a major factory in the town.

On 15 March 1907 Feuerbach was officially raised to the status of a town in its own right. In 1929 Feuerbach merged voluntarily with the neighboring community of modern-day Stuttgart-Weilimdorf.

On 1 May 1933 Feuerbach was engulfed by the expanding city of Stuttgart and given the status of "Feuerbach district".

During the division of Stuttgart into Stadtbezirke (city districts) in 1956, Feuerbach was officially named Feuerbach Stadtbezirk. City district changes on 1 January 2001 resulted in the division of Feuerbach into the neighbourhoods of An der Burg, Bahnhof Feuerbach, Feuerbach-Mitte, Feuerbach-Ost, Feuerbacher Tal, Hohe Warte, Lemberg/Föhrich and Siegelberg.

== Economy and infrastructure ==
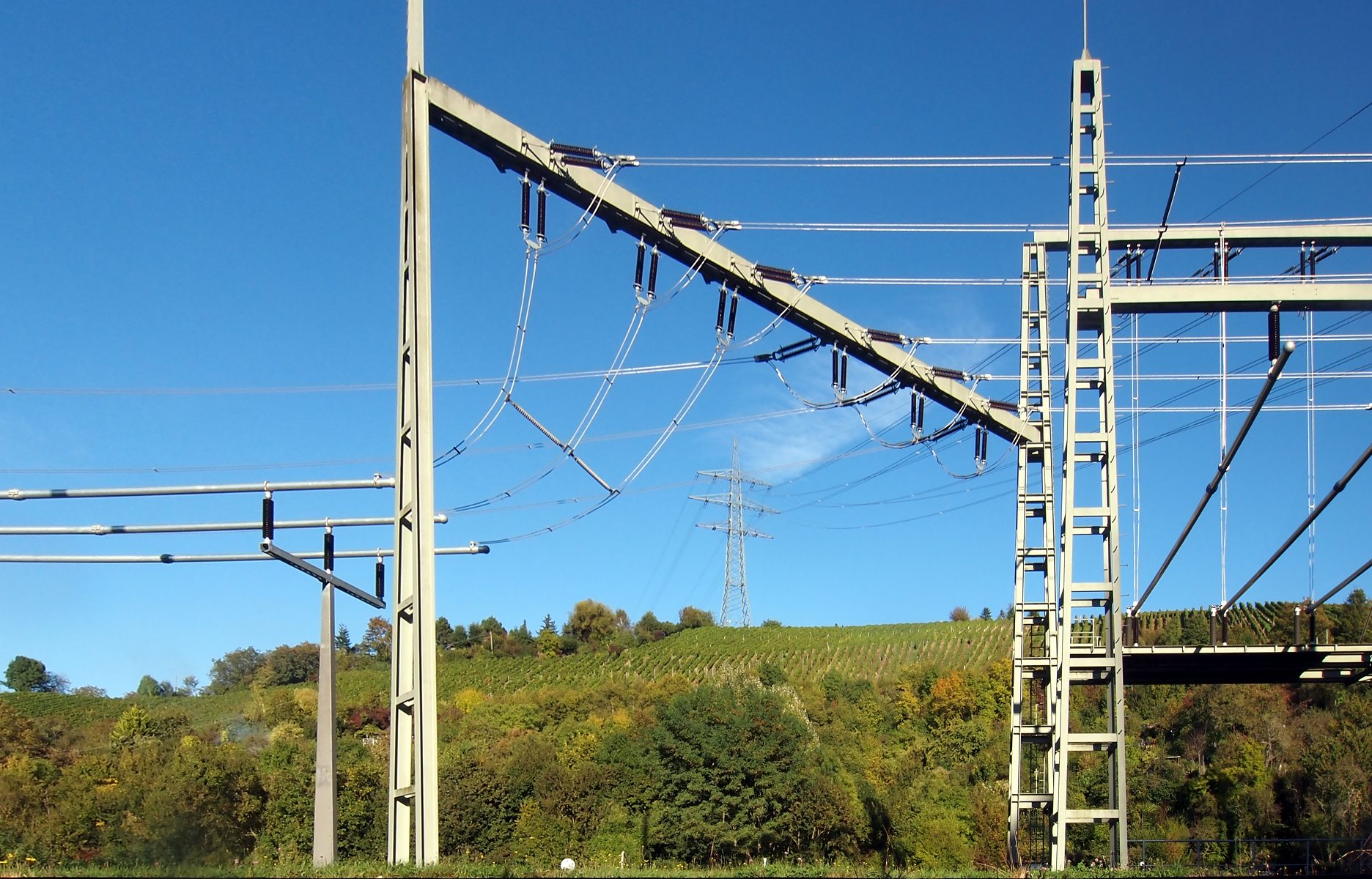
Besides industry, there still are vineyards

Feuerbach has played a central role in the development of Stuttgart as a major German center of industry. As a result, it is still home to a large number of companies, including major internationals and small and medium-sized automotive suppliers.

=== Local companies ===
- In 1864 the first industrial producer of quinine came to Feuerbach, establishing the foundations for the German chemical industry.
- In 1871 the engineer and 'receipt-book maker' Louis Leitz founded the "Workshop for the manufacture of metal parts for organizational materials" in Feuerbach. His company, now Esselte Leitz GmbH & Co KG, subsequently became known in Germany as the inventor of the ring binder.
- In 1910 Robert Bosch GmbH moved its headquarters from neighboring Stuttgart to Feuerbach.
- Akzo Nobel Coatings GmbH
- Coperion (originally Werner & Pfleiderer)
- Behr GmbH & Co. KG
- Thieme Publishing Group

=== Local transport ===
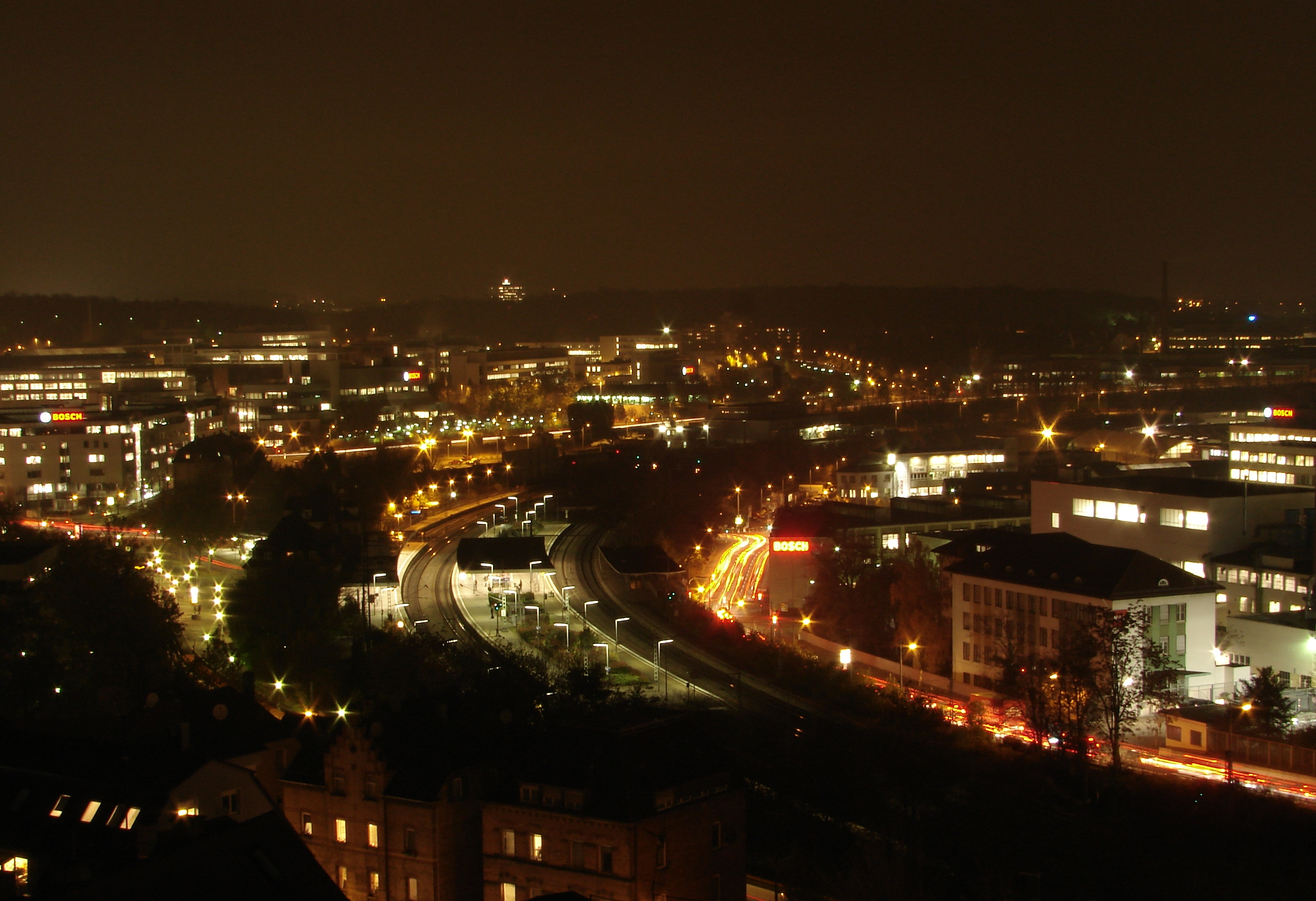
Feuerbach's railway station at night

Feuerbach lies directly on the B10 dual carriageway between Karlsruhe and Ulm, the B27 between Heilbronn and Tübingen) and the B295 between Calw and Stuttgart), not far from the A81 Autobahn running north–south to the west of Stuttgart.

As an outlying district of Stuttgart, Feuerbach station is served by the S4, S5 and S6 lines of the Stuttgart S-Bahn suburban railway as well as the U6 and U13 underground lines of the Stuttgart Stadtbahn and a variety of local bus services.

=== Schools ===
- Bachschule (Grundschule)
- Hattenbühlschule (Grundschule)
- Bismarckschule (Hauptschule and Werkrealschule)
- Hohewartschule (Grundschule)
- Realschule Feuerbach (part of Hohewartschule)
- Neues Gymnasium Leibniz

Feuerbach is also home to a vocational school for paint and design, another for woodworking technology, the Leitz business administration school and the Kerschensteinerschule for business technology.

== Churches and religious organizations ==
Feuerbach hosts a large multi-cultural community also reflected in the religious landscape which includes:
3 Catholic churches, 4 Protestant churches, one Free Protestant church, a United Methodist church, a New Apostolic Church, a free church of the Biblische Glaubens-Gemeinde (with 2200 seats, Stuttgart's largest church), a Greek Orthodox church, a Turkish Muslim mosque and an Albanian Muslim mosque.

== People ==
Honorary citizens include:

- 1908: August Happold, Industrialist (1846–1922)
- 1909: Dr Oswald Hesse, Privy Councillor and chemist
- 1917: Robert Bosch, Industrialist (1861–1942)

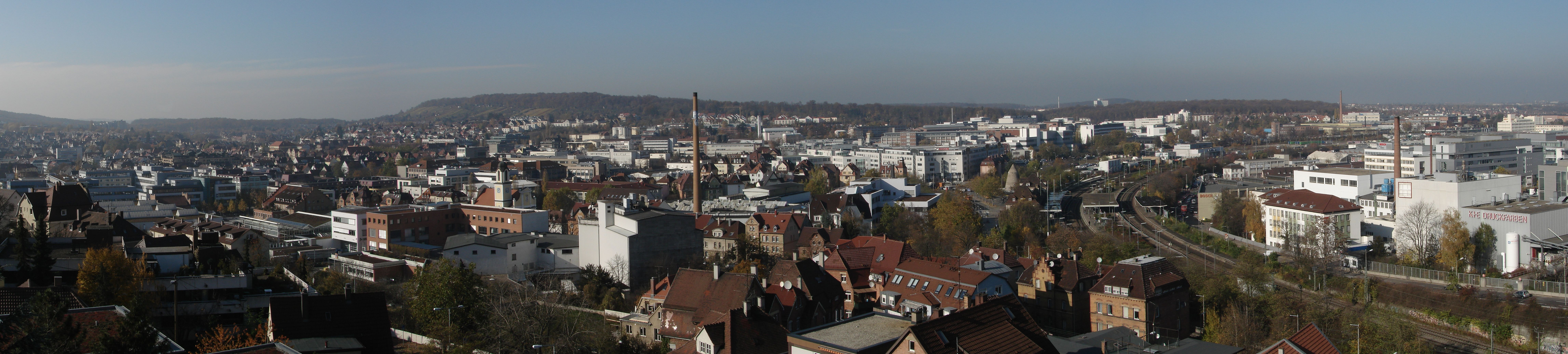
Panorama of Stuttgart-Feuerbach
