= Alexander Tuschinski =

German filmmaker and writer

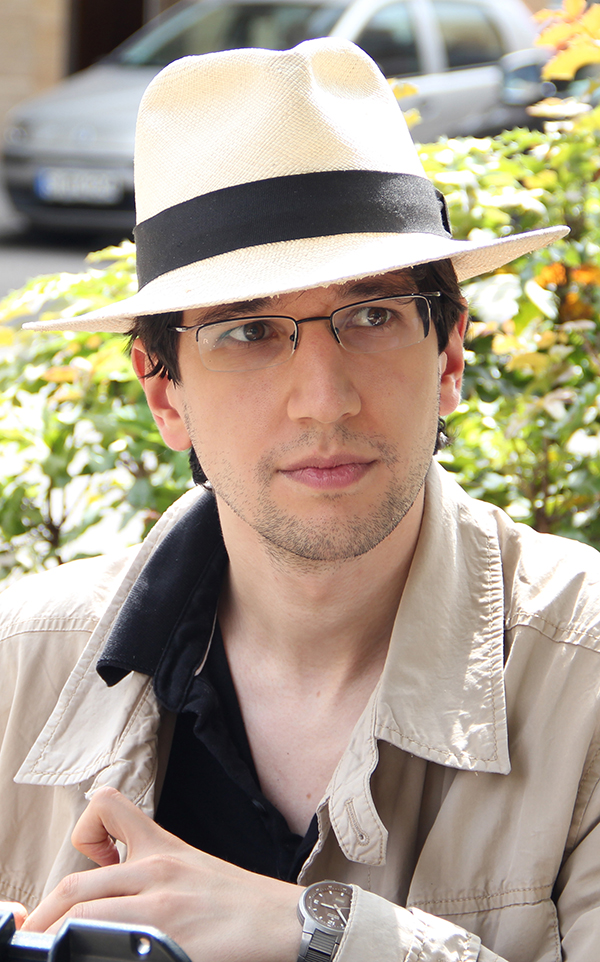
- 2014 on the set of Timeless
- Occupations: Film director; producer; writer; actor
- Years active: 2008–present

Alexander Konstantin Ritter von Tuschinski (born October 28, 1988) is a German filmmaker and writer.

== Life and works ==
=== Early life and education ===
Tuschinski's paternal family came from Czernowitz; Ritter von as part of the family name dates from the Austro-Hungarian period. During World War II, they lost their property and settled in Sighișoara, Romania, where both of Tuschinski's parents were born. They emigrated to West Germany in 1983.

Alexander Tuschinski was born in Stuttgart on October 28, 1988; he attended Dillmann-Gymnasium in Stuttgart until 2008, and then studied audiovisual media at Hochschule der Medien, graduating in 2011. He then studied history and German philology at the University of Stuttgart. In 2025, Tuschinski was a PhD candidate in history at the University of Innsbruck.

=== Work ===
In 2009, Tuschinski wrote and directed the feature film Menschenliebe. The film and short films he directed around the same period were screened at international film festivals and received awards. In 2010, Tuschinski began filming his feature film Break-Up. It later received awards at film festivals in the United States. For a U.S. retrospective in 2012, Tuschinski restored Tinto Brass's films Nerosubianco and Dropout using footage from Brass' archive.

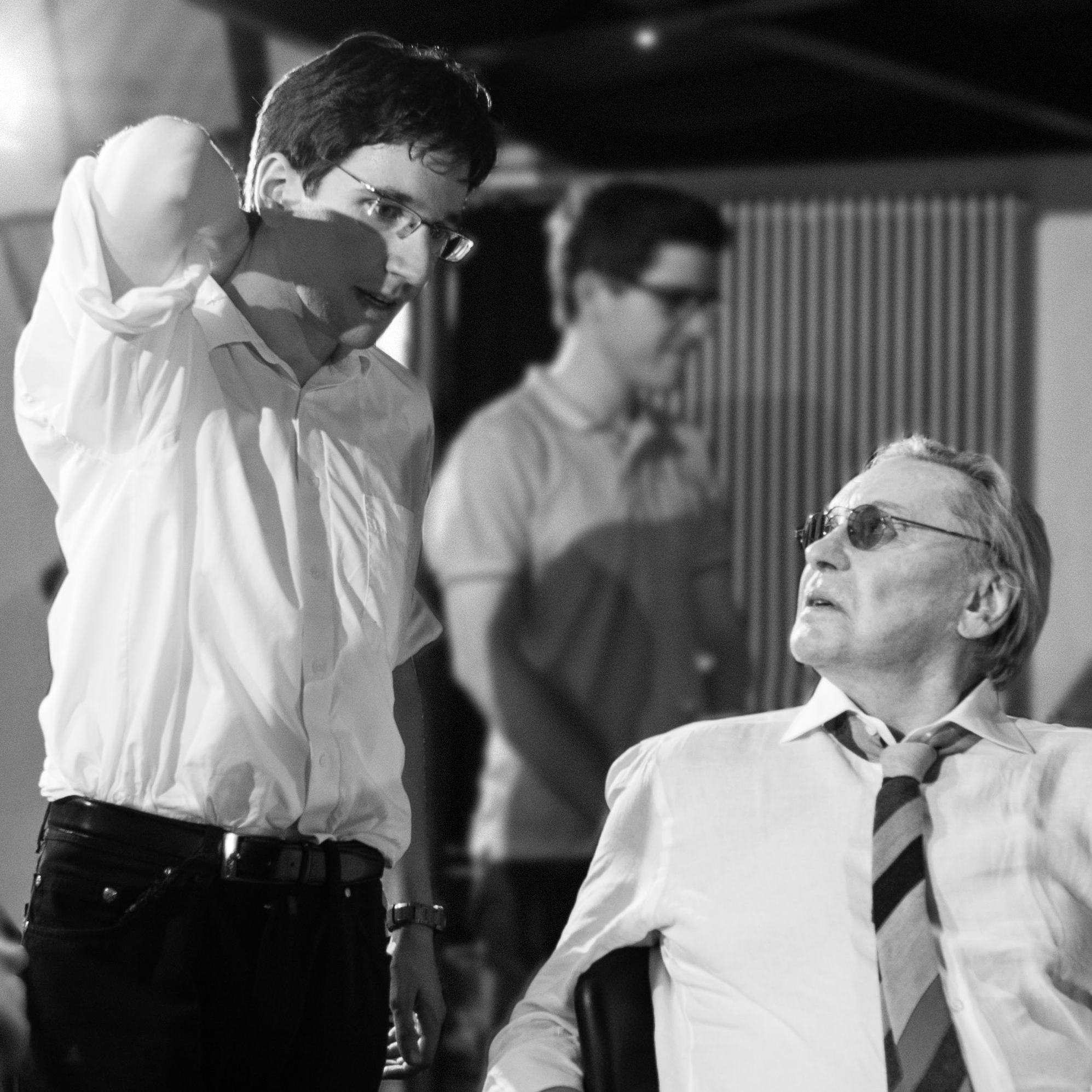
Helmut Berger (right) and Tuschinski on the set of Timeless (2015)

In 2014-15, Tuschinski wrote and directed the feature film Timeless.

Tuschinski assisted Hugo Niebeling in restoring and re-editing B7, Niebeling's director's cut of his 1972 film showing the Berlin Philharmonic performing Beethoven's Symphony No. 7, conducted by Herbert von Karajan. Niebeling and Tuschinski together edited Niebeling's short film Apotheosis of Dance from the last movement of the symphony.

In 2018, Tuschinski's documentary film Mission: Caligula on Tinto Brass's original plans for the film Caligula was released. Before that, Tuschinski had researched the subject in his bachelor's thesis and was involved in the rediscovery of the film's raw footage and Brass's 1970s workprint. At the premiere, Kelly Holland discussed plans for Tuschinski to complete the workprint in Brass's style, if possible with Brass's participation. Ultimately, the project did not happen.

Tuschinski directed several short films in 2017–2019, including the documentary Caligari in the Desert about Roger Ball and The Songwriter of Botnang about Gerda Herrmann, which were screened at several international festivals.

In 2019, Tuschinski wrote and directed the feature film Fetzenleben. It was largely shot in Paris, and screened at film festivals. In 2021, Tuschinski directed the feature-length documentary Statue of Liberty about Tomas Kurth and his project to build a "Statue of Liberty of Stuttgart" during lockdown. Statue of Liberty screened together with Fetzenleben and the second instalment of Die Liedermacherin von Botnang at Filmschau Baden-Württemberg in December 2022.

Between 2022 and 2025, Tuschinski directed documentaries on political topics, including Whisper and Laugh (Flüstern und Lachen) and Tale of a Meme (Schwachkopf-Affäre). In 2025, he published academic work on his family history, including on his grandfather's writings.
