= Louis Leitz =

German inventor

- Born: 2 May 1846; Ingersheim, Neckarkreis, Kingdom of Württemberg
- Died: 18 May 1918 (aged 72); Stuttgart, Neckarkreis, Kingdom of Württemberg
- Occupations: Entrepreneur, inventor, founder of Esselte Leitz GmbH & Co KG

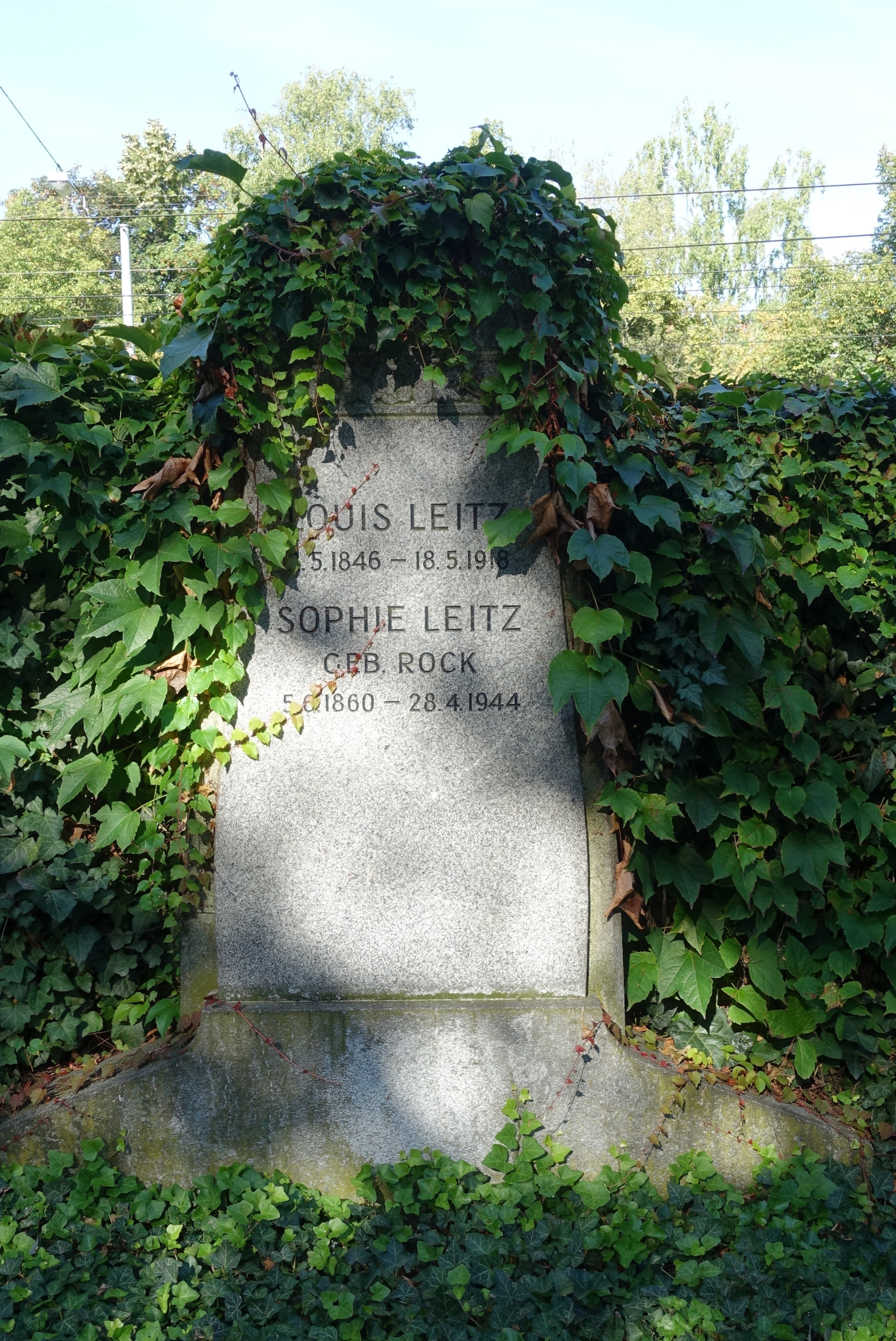

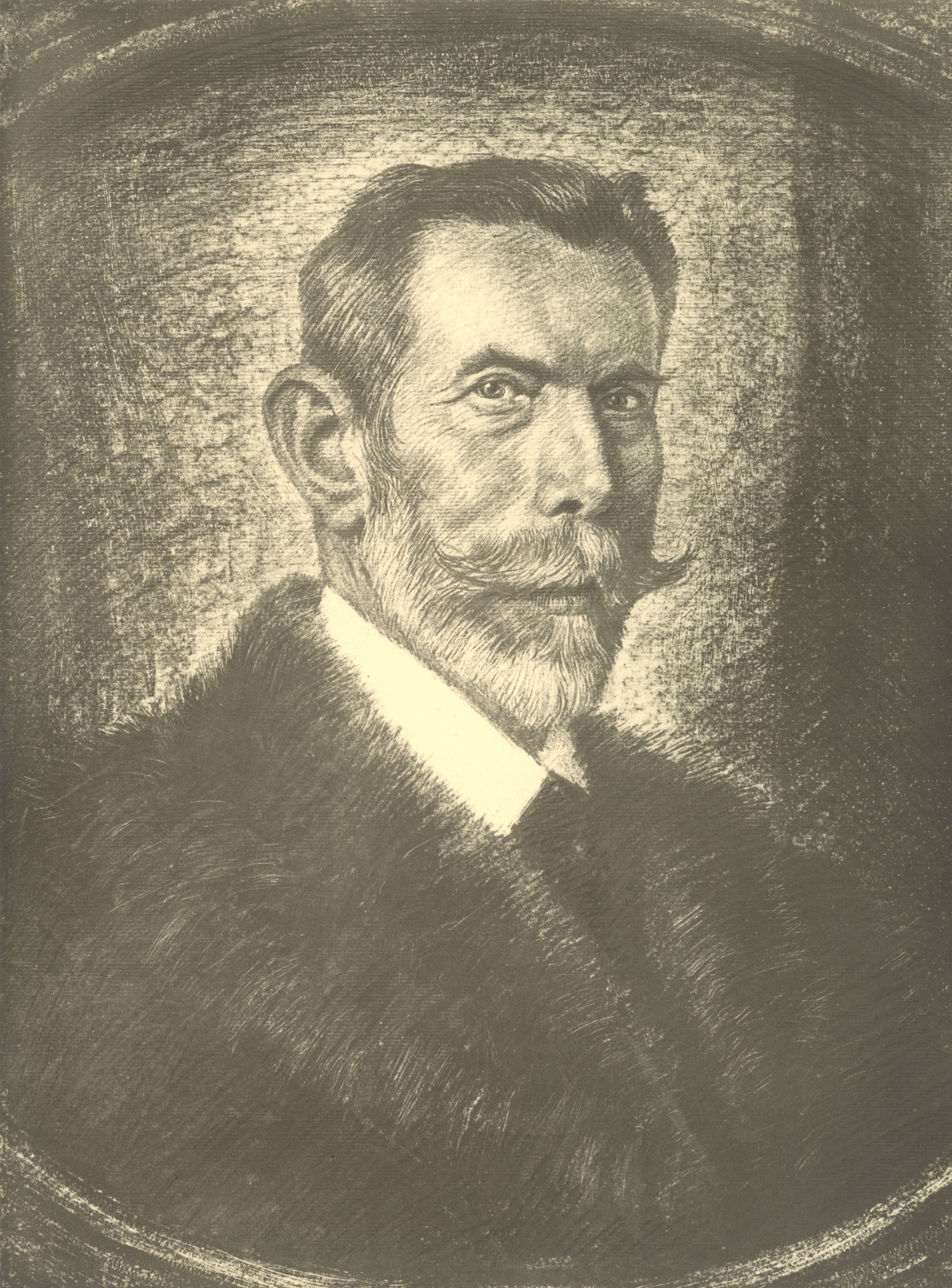
Louis Leitz

Louis Leitz (May 2, 1846 – May 18, 1918) was a German mechanic and entrepreneur who came to fame as the inventor of the Leitz ring binders later named after him.

== Life ==
=== Childhood ===
Johann Ludwig (Louis) Leitz was born on May 2, 1846, in Ingersheim, Kingdom of Württemberg, in southwest Germany. His were humble beginnings: His father Johann Ludwig Leitz (1810–1860) was a cooper, while his mother Christophine Friederike Durian (1812–1858) was the daughter of the local butcher Jakob Durian. Both his father and mother died while Johann Ludwig Leitz was still a child and in 1860, aged 14, his six siblings he was an orphan.

In keeping with the fashion of the day, Leitz later changed his middle name to the French name Louis.

=== Education and early career ===
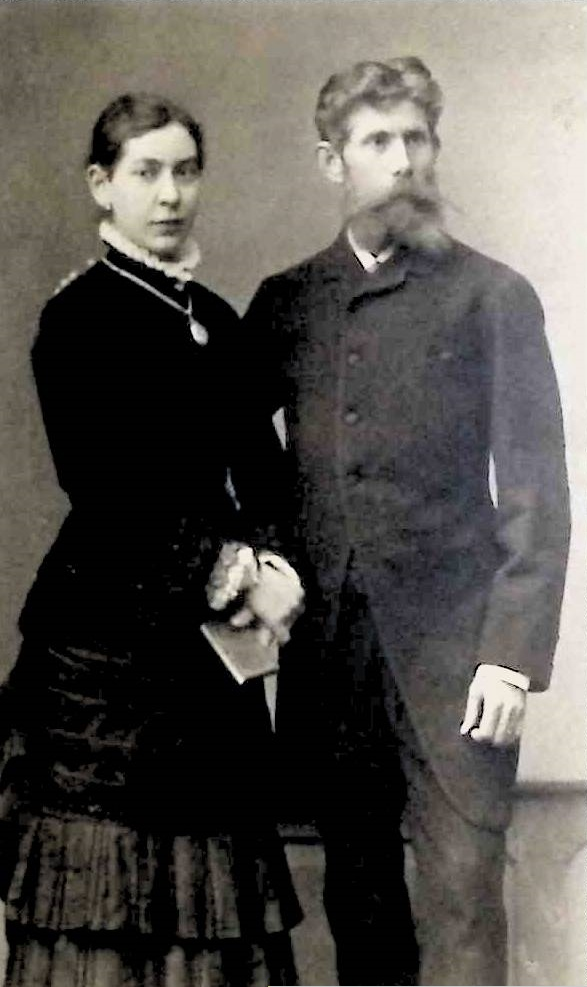
Louis Leitz and his wife Sophie

Around 1860 Leitz began an apprenticeship as a turner in the metal-working trade at the Theilacker company in Neuenstadt am Kocher. His grandfather Christian Gottlieb had lived until 1807 in Neuenstadt am Kocher, outside Heilbronn. Until 1868, Leitz is said to have worked at the same time for mechanic Ernst Westhäuser in Heilbronn. Alongside his apprenticeship, he worked as a mechanic for his brother-in-law Jakob Trefz in a coal dealership in Stuttgart. Starting in 1870, he worked for a year in the Stuttgart-based Friedrich Rauh sewing machine factory; it manufactured not only sewing machines but also mechanisms for ‘bibliorhaptes’ – the predecessor of the modern file binder. It was there that Leitz gained his first experience in making bibliorhaptes, a patented mechanical binding device invented in France in the 19^{th} century that innovated office management. When the French patent for the bibliorhapte expired in 1868 it became possible to manufacture the device in Germany, too. During Leitz’ time in the factory in Stuttgart he got to know mechanic Carl Heinrich, who was the manufacturing foreman for the Bibliorhapte mechanism.

=== Family ===
In 1872, Louis Leitz married Julie Adele Gauchat, a teacher of French. She died only five years after their wedding; the couple had had no children. In 1882, Louis Leitz married Sophie née Rock (1860–1944). Leitz died on May 18, 1918, aged 72, and was buried in Stuttgart’s Pragfriedhof cemetery. He and Sophie Leitz had four children, first two boys Ludwig (1884–1954) and Eberhard (1888–1955), and then two daughters, Elsa (born 1895) and Gertrud (born 1897). Both sons became partners in their father’s company before he died, namely on April 1, 1918. His three grandsons, Manfred, Martin, and Conrad Leitz, as well as his grandson-in-law Dr. Herbert Klaiber later worked as the third generation of the family in Leitz, which was still family owned. Until its sale in 1998, the company was managed by four executives who were all members of the fourth generation of Louis Leitz’ descendants.

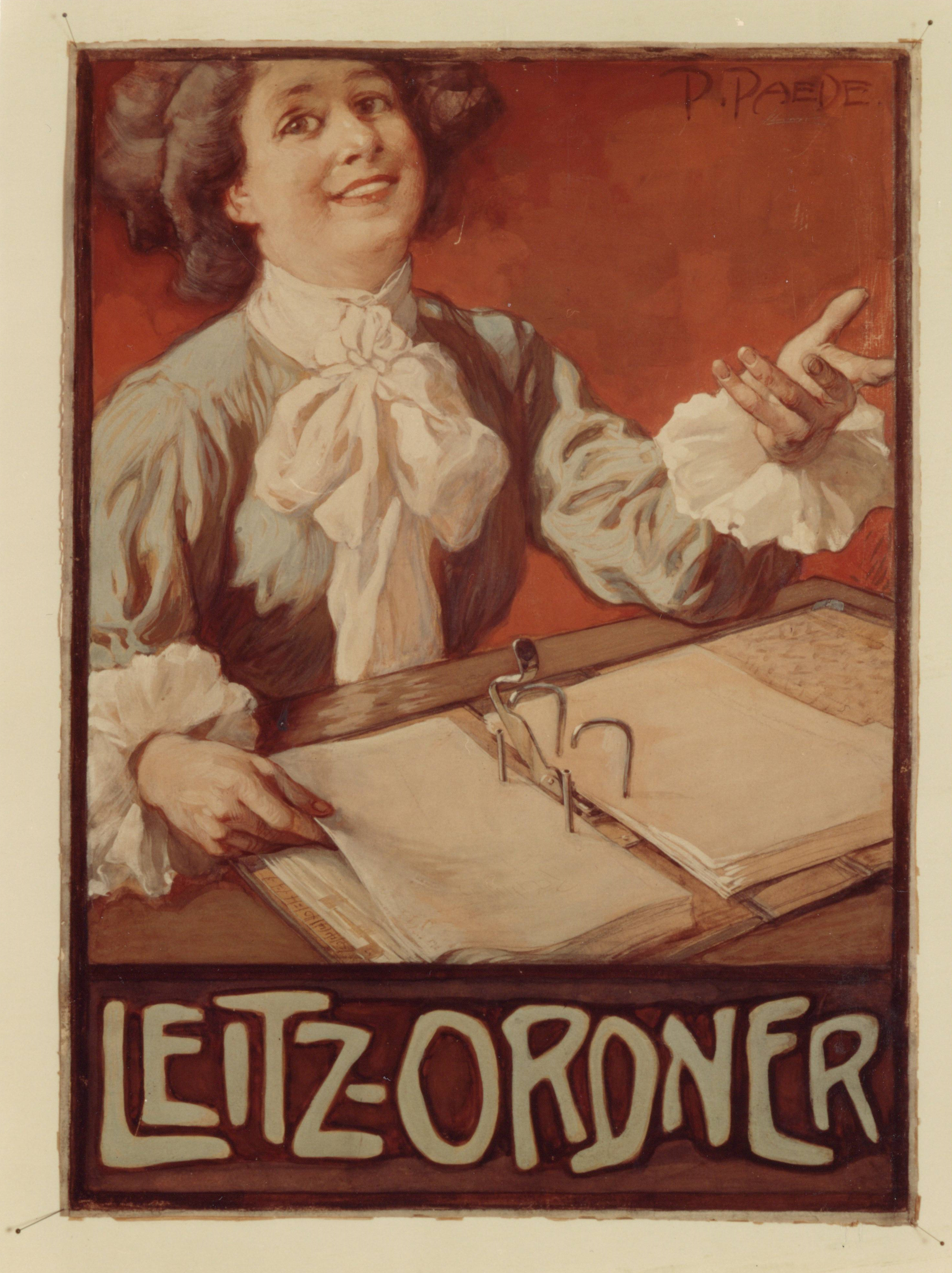
Advertising poster from 1912

== Achievements ==
=== Founder and entrepreneur ===
At the age of 25, Louis Leitz and Carl Heinrich together founded a “Mechanische Werkstatt und Fakturabücherei” on July 1, 1871. This mechanical workshop produced metal parts for filing systems and business ledgers and was located at Kasernenstraße 35 (today’s Leuschnerstraße) in Feuerbach, outside Stuttgart (today a district of Stuttgart). In 1872, only one year after the company had been established, co-founder and partner Heinrich withdrew. With support from his brother Jakob Leitz and another staff member, Louis Leitz continued the business. His wife Sophie Leitz also backed him up strongly during the early years, played an active role in the company, and at the same time looked after the family so that her husband could devote himself entirely to the business.

Taking his cue from the French model, in 1893 Louis Leitz invented the first Leitz ring binder, the Type A, the “Indexed File Binder A”, with his first lever and arch mechanism. He continued to develop the idea through 1896 and made some important changes to the development of ring binders. He came up with an innovative lever mechanism to open and close the ring arches by placing the lever outside the arches to make it easier to use. Leitz created the lever arch file, a standing binder with a riveted lever arch mechanism (the lever can be easily opened, closed and locked) and space-saving slots into the cover, thereby introducing the modern ring binder.

Leitz revolutionized office organization with his invention of the lever mechanism at the end of the 19^{th} century. In 1903–4, he launched a lever-based file with a so-called eccentric locking mechanism and thus a roller on the office supplies market. He had patented the roller as early as 1902. This revolutionary mechanism is to be found more or less unchanged in all file binders. In 1911, a "finger hole" was introduced on the side of the binder to aid removal from crowded shelves and make it easier for users to pull it from a row on a shelf. The Bosch corporation in Stuttgart was one of the first local customers to procure Leitz file binders.

In 1901, Louis Leitz also invented the first standalone holepunch, the “Phoenix”; until that point, the hole punch had been attached to the file. That same year, the spines of Leitz file binders first boasted the name “Leitz-Ordner A” in the brushstroke script with Chinese overtones still known to this day. Leitz had registered it as a trademark on October 24, 1901. With his idea of having the company name printed as a brand name on the file binders’ spine Leitz laid the foundations on which the Leitz file binder became the generic term for file binders in Germany and a generally used symbol of orderly office management. This was followed in 1907–8 by giving the binder spine a likewise readily recognizable image with the black-and-green and/or black-and-white green-marbled paper backing. From 1911 onwards, the green Leitz logo on a black background was printed onto the binder spines.

In 1913, Louis Leitz founded the letter-file convention together with six other German letter-file factory owners, among them Soennecken (his rival at the time). The objective was to counteract the strong competition in the market by reaching cartel agreements, in particular jointly set prices.

The strong demand for office supplies in the wake of the increasing bureaucratization of government agencies and corporations alike spurred his company's growth: By 1891, Leitz already had a payment roll of 15 and relocated his business premises to a new building that combined his home and business at Traubenstraße 9 in Feuerbach; the family lived on the upper floors. Between 1894 and 1898, as demand for Leitz office supplies continued to soar, and sales rose, the payroll almost tripled from 26 to 63 employees, and in 1897 the company then moved to a modern factory building in Siemensstraße 64 in Feuerbach which Louis Leitz had had purpose-built and where it is headquartered to this day. In 1905, Leitz opened a branch office in Vienna and in 1911 a first branch factory in Berlin. In 1914, shortly before World War I broke out the Leitz company's payroll had already topped 200. In 1918, Leitz died in Stuttgart.

In 1998, the firm he had founded as a family-owned mid-sized company managed by the fourth generation of family members was sold to Swedish office supplies corporation Esselte. Since 2016, it has been part of the US ACCO Brands corporation and now operates under the name of LEITZ ACCO Brands GmbH & Co. KG.

The eponymous, non-profit Louis Leitz Foundation was founded in his memory on 30 November 2001 by the third, fourth and fifth generation of Louis Leitz' descendants. The foundation is dedicated to supporting projects in the fields of education, training, and work for disadvantages people or people who find themselves in distress. The foundation's budget is 120,000 euros per annum.

== In his honor ==
- The Louis Leitz School in Stuttgart’s Feuerbach district was named after him.
- The Louis Leitz Stiftung in Stuttgart bears his name.
- Streets are named after him in Bremen's Oberneuland district, Ingersheim, and Stuttgart.
- A stele was erected in his memory in his native Ingersheim on the occasion of the 175th anniversary of his birth.
- Since 2021, the permanent exhibition at Haus der Geschichte Baden-Württemberg in Stuttgart has included a display case with exhibits on Louis Leitz.
