= Mahle Behr =

Mahle Behr GmbH & Co. KG
- Company type: Private GmbH
- Industry: Automotive
- Founded: 1905
- Founder: Julius Friedrich Behr
- Headquarters: Stuttgart-Feuerbach, Germany
- Area served: Worldwide
- Products: Automotive air conditioning, Engine cooling systems
- Number of employees: 17,000 (2010)
- Parent: Mahle GmbH
- Website: www.mahle.com

Mahle Behr GmbH & Co. KG is a German corporation active in the automobile industry, headquartered in Stuttgart-Feuerbach. It is a specialist for automotive air conditioning and engine cooling systems. In 2006 group sales was €3.2 billion and it employed 18,600 staff.

Mahle Behr has major U.S. operations in Troy, Michigan, Dayton, Ohio (Behr Dayton Thermal Products), Charleston, South Carolina, Fort Worth, Texas.
