= Behr Dayton Thermal Products =

Behr Dayton Thermal Products LLC is a 570,000-square-foot (53,000 m^{2}) auto parts facility located in Dayton, Ohio. The Dayton plant is a major U.S. operation of the German company Behr GmbH & Co. KG. This facility manufactures vehicle air conditioning and engine cooling systems. Chrysler Corporation owned and operated this facility from about 1937 until April 2002.

== Products and processes ==
Products manufactured from this plant include HVAC, EC modules, evaporators, radiators, condensers, and heater cores. Processes include forming of coil stock, nocolok and vacuum brazing, tube welding, injection molding, stamping, module assembly, surface treatment, testing, and prototype build.
