= Maximilian Mörseburg =

German lawyer and politician (born 1992)

Member of the Bundestag; for Stuttgart II
- In office 26 October 2021 – 25 March 2025
- Preceded by: Susanne Wetterich
- Succeeded by: Vacant

Personal details
- Born: 22 March 1992 (age 34) Stuttgart, Germany
- Party: Christian Democratic Union

Maximilian Mörseburg (born 22 March 1992) is a German lawyer and politician of the Christian Democratic Union (CDU) who served as a member of the Bundestag from 2021 to 2025.

Since 2022, he is the International Secretary and head of the International Commission of the Young Union, the youth wing of CDU and CSU.

== Early life and education ==
Möseburg was born 1992 in the German city of Stuttgart and studied law in order to become a lawyer.

== Political career ==
Möseburg entered the CDU in 2010 and was elected directly to the Bundestag in 2021, representing the Stuttgart II district. In the 2025 election he received 30.4% of the vote, but the seat remained vacant due to insufficient second votes.
