= Pendaflex =

American manufacturer of office supplies

- Company type: Private
- Industry: Retail
- Founded: Manhattan, New York City (1882)
- Headquarters: Melville, New York, U.S., USA
- Products: Office Organization & Paper Solutions
- Website: www.pendaflex.com

Pendaflex is a maker of office filing products headquartered in Melville, New York, United States. It is a wholly owned subsidiary of TOPS Products.

== History ==
=== 1882–1909: Early years ===
The company was founded in Manhattan in 1882 by brothers Charles S. Jonas and Richard A. Jonas. Their company, Charles S. Jonas and Brother, first operated in paper ruling, where they provided the service of ruling lines on paper for customers.

After 1900, businesses started to use filing systems with index cards and file folders. In response to the changing market, Charles S. Jonas and Brother began manufacturing their own items. The product line was at first limited to index cards and guides, and gradually expanded, with sales covering a larger territory. The company was renamed the Record Card Company in 1909.

=== 1918–1939: New product development ===
In 1918, the Record Card Company first registered the brand name Oxford. The success of the Oxford brand led the company to change its name in 1921 to the Oxford Filing Supply Company. In 1939, the company began making expanding envelopes and introduced file folder labels in rolls, as well as corrugated board transfer files in a drawer style. The company also began producing the Oxford Pendaflex hanging file folder, a filing pouch that hooked over the sides of a file drawer. Smaller files placed inside the hanging file allowed the drawer to be easily subdivided. The company called its Pendaflex hanging file "the greatest development in filing since the evolution of the filing folder".

=== 1940–1968: U.S. expansion ===
Oxford Filing Supply gradually expanded its operations beyond the New York City area, establishing a factory in St. Louis in the 1930s. Its main plant moved in 1948 from Brooklyn to Garden City, New York. The company built a West Coast manufacturing facility in 1953 in Los Angeles, and the St. Louis and Los Angeles plants were expanded several times in the 1960s. Also, during this time, the company opened new facilities in Augusta, Georgia, and in East Rutherford, New Jersey, while establishing an equipment division in Long Island, which later moved to larger quarters in Moonachie, New Jersey.

=== 1969–1975: International expansion ===
In 1969 Oxford Filing Supply Company changed its name to the Oxford Pendaflex Corporation. In 1972, Pendaflex introduced their color-coded system of filing. Business continued to grow and during the early 1970s, Oxford Pendaflex expanded its New Jersey, Missouri, Georgia, and California facilities. By 1976, the company had subsidiaries in Mexico, Costa Rica, and Venezuela, about 1,200 employees, and a marketing organization supplying approximately 5,500 dealers and 60 wholesalers across the U.S. and Canada.

=== 1976–1978: Takeover by Esselte ===
In 1976, the Swedish office supply firm Esselte AB made an offer to acquire Oxford Pendaflex. Oxford Pendaflex shares had been trading on the New York Stock Exchange for between $13 and $14 a share, and Esselte offered $23 a share to take over the American company. The two companies announced an agreement in March 1976, and Oxford Pendaflex became part of the Swedish company's Esselte Business Systems group. Esselte was a much larger firm than Oxford Pendaflex, with 1975 sales of approximately $350 million, compared to an estimated $60 million for the U.S. firm. Esselte acquired Oxford Pendaflex in order to gain access to the American and Canadian market.

Sales grew in the years after the take over, reaching close to $75 million by 1978. That year Oxford Pendaflex, backed by parent company Esselte, took over the California company Dymo Industries, which was well known for its Dymotape labeling equipment. Dymo had revenues of close to $210 million, and more than half of its sales came from foreign operations. Esselte had already distributed some of the Dymo line in Europe and paid out $43.5 million for the company. Although Dymo initially resisted the takeover, by July 1978 Oxford Pendaflex controlled 94 per cent of Dymotape's stock. Oxford took over the Dymo product lines, which included accounting books and the Sten-C-Labl addressing system, in addition to Dymotape.

=== 1979–1989: Growth through acquisition ===
The next year, Oxford Pendaflex changed its name to Esselte Pendaflex Corporation and continued to expand through acquisitions. In 1981, Esselte Pendaflex took over the operation of its parent company's U.S. price marking division by integrating with the Esselte subsidiary Esselte Meto. Esselte Meto had been formed out of the price marking operations of Dymo and that of a 1980 acquisition, Primark.

The company's next major addition was the Boorum & Pease Company in 1985. Boorum & Pease, based in Elizabeth, New Jersey, manufactured and marketed office supplies, record-keeping supplies, and information storage and retrieval products, and was a leading manufacturer of blank books and loose-leaf binders. Esselte Pendaflex paid $40 million for the company, which had a revenue of $70 million in 1985. That year, Esselte Pendaflex also acquired a Los Angeles firm called Universal Paper Goods. This company was a West Coast business manufacturing custom order folders and office supplies.

Esselte Business Systems, of which Esselte Pendaflex was a division, continued to pursue growth through acquisition. The company acquired nine firms in 1987, with total combined annualized sales of around $85 million. The three divisions of Esselte Business Systems, which included Esselte Pendaflex for office supplies, a division specializing in graphic arts supplies, and a retail supply division, posted record sales and profits in 1987. In 1987 Esselte Pendaflex also named a new president, Theodore V. Kachel.

=== 1990–1995: Declining business ===
In the early 1990s, the U.S. market for office supplies weakened significantly. Parent company Esselte instituted a cost-cutting plan that included extensive layoffs in 1990 and 1991, in order to make up for the deteriorating market conditions in the U.S. and some European markets. Sales for Esselte Pendaflex dropped off steeply between 1989 and 1990, and revenue remained relatively static over the next few years. Operating income also decreased significantly between 1989 and 1990, and in 1993 the company posted a loss.

The company's difficulties were attributed in part to changes in the overall North American office supply market. Distribution became more concentrated as stores consolidated through mergers and acquisitions, and new superstores became more important players. Competition was intense between the large distributors, and prices overall were forced down. By 1993, Esselte Pendaflex had a smaller pool of customers than in past years, though the customers on the whole were larger. Another change in the market lay in the declining number of white collar workers within major corporations. Although more people were working from their homes, with an estimated 39 million home offices in 1992, this did not fully offset the loss of corporate workers.

Esselte Pendaflex was aware of these changing conditions and took steps to keep pace. However, the company's operating costs were very high in the early 1990s, and many of its products had low profit margins. The company appointed a new divisional president in April 1993, Alan Wood. His mission was to reorganize the company for cost efficiency. Esselte Pendaflex expected to make major transitions through 1993 and 1994.

=== 1995–present: Takeover by J.W. Childs and RR Donnelley ===
Despite recent changes in the market, the company still saw opportunity for growth and predicted improved profitability over the coming years. On July 11, 2002, the private equity investment firm, J.W. Childs, announced that it had decided to implement a public offer to the shareholders of Esselte/Pendaflex. The purchase price for Esselte was SEK 90 per share, equivalent to SEK 3,100 million (approximately US $330 million). The change in ownership provided Esselte with greater financial flexibility to pursue a growth-oriented business strategy that included new product development and design in all product categories.

The J.W. Childs acquisition also brought with it a lean management system philosophy that bases manufacturing runs and procurement on what it sells. Pendaflex expected to reduce work-in-process inventory by 50 per cent or more, and turn over finished goods inventory every month.

In 2014, RR Donnelley acquired all of the North American operations of Esselte. In 2016, RR Donnelley spun off its office products business as LSC Communications. LSC Communications currently offers its Oxford, Pendaflex and Ampad products through its subsidiary division TOPS Office Products.

== Technology and products ==
Pendaflex produces a wide range of office supplies including general filing products, labeling systems, report covers, bound books, binders, loose-leaf supplies, plastic office accessories, and document binding systems. Approximately 90 percent of the company's products are produced in its facilities located in Missouri, Los Angeles, California, and other U.S. cities, as well as in Toronto, Canada. Pendaflex's market is primarily in the United States and Canada, with a growing presence in the Mexican market. A small portion of its sales are from exports to the Caribbean, South and Central America, the Middle East, and Asia.

=== Environmentally friendly filing ===
In 1990, Pendaflex introduced Earthwise, a line of recycled filing supplies aimed at reducing environmental impact.

=== Mobile Office File ===
In 2000, Pendaflex introduced a new product called the Pendaflex Mobile File, a product designed for transporting documents securely and with protection against water damage.

=== Hanging file folders ===
In February 2004, Pendaflex released another new product line, an update to the original hanging file folder, called Pendaflex Ready-Tab Hanging Folders. This product added pre-installed tabs across the top of the hanging folders.

=== Desktop organization ===
In September 2006, Pendaflex launched its line of “PileSmart" products. After extensive research, Pendaflex discovered that half of office workers would rather pile documents than file them. This led to the development of filing system products that would allow workers to keep piling – in an organized fashion.

== Pendaflex Online Learning Center ==
On March 19, 2003, Pendaflex launched the Pendaflex Learning Center, an online education source that educates consumers on organizational techniques and systems. Pendaflex Learning Centers teaches users office essentials such as Microsoft Word, Excel and PowerPoint, and offers in-depth courses on critical topics such as starting, marketing, managing and growing a business.

== I Hate Filing Club ==
In 1986, Pendaflex launched the “I Hate Filing Club” for administrative professionals who dislike filing. An online version of the I Hate Filing Club was introduced in 1999.

Members of the I Hate Filing Club communicate with their peers and share organizational ideas in the online community through a community message board, a monthly “Keeping Tabs” newsletter and by interacting with Club President, Sharon Mann in the “Ask Sharon” forum.

The I Hate Filing Club has over 100,000 members.

=== The Pendaflex Administrative Professional Hall of Fame ===
In 2005, I Hate Filing Club members were invited to nominate employees, coworkers or friends for the prestigious “Administrative Professional of the Year” title. Nominating essays were judged by the President of the International Association of Administrative Professionals (IAAP), the President of National Association of Professional Organizers (NAPO) and a team of Pendaflex executives. The winner received a spa vacation for two in Arizona and a $4,000 stipend, along with a golden PENDY, a fresh bouquet of flowers every month for a year and Pendaflex organizational products, including the Project Sorter, Mobile File and Get-A-Grip Expanding File.

== Environmental record ==
In the early 1990s, Pendaflex developed a line of products made from 100% recycled papers. This product line, called Earthwise, was the first line of filing supplies to meet or exceed the United States Environmental Protection Agency's revised guidelines of 30% for post-consumer and recycled content, as they were made from fiber that contains 50% post-consumer materials.

On April 30, 2008, Pendaflex announced that it achieved Sustainable Forestry Initiative (SFI Inc.) fiber sourcing certification across the United States.
