= Karin Maag =

German politician (born 1962)

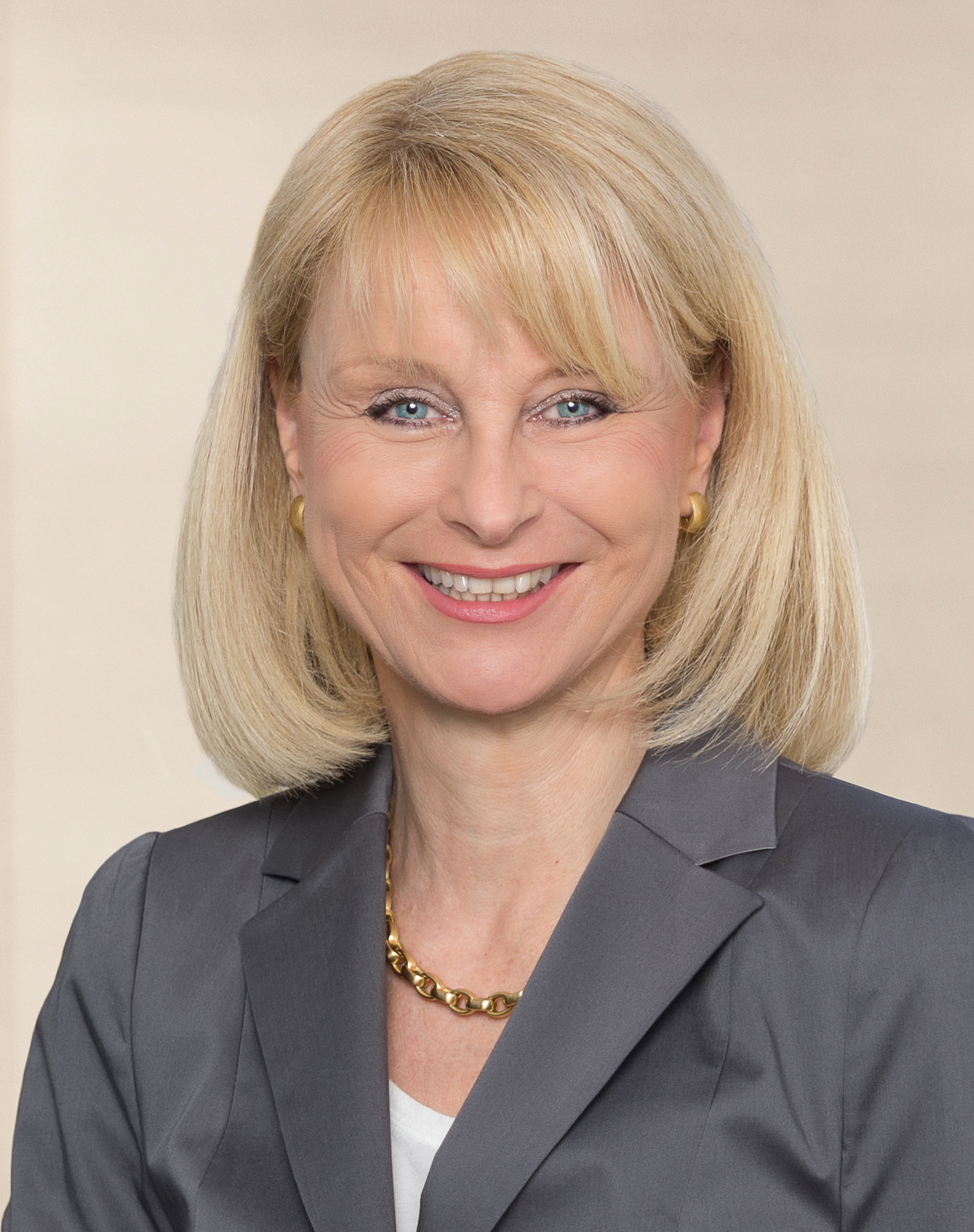
- Maag in 2013

Member of the Bundestag; for Stuttgart II
- In office 27 October 2009 – 30 June 2021
- Preceded by: Ute Kumpf
- Succeeded by: Susanne Wetterich

Personal details
- Born: 13 June 1962 (age 64) Stuttgart, West Germany (now Germany)
- Party: Christian Democratic
- Education: University of Tübingen

Karin Maag (born 13 June 1962) is a German politician of the Christian Democratic Union (CDU) who served as a member of the Bundestag from the state of Baden-Württemberg from 2009 to 2021.

== Early career ==
From 2004 until 2007, Maag served as chief of staff to Wolfgang Schuster in his role as Lord Mayor of Stuttgart. She later headed the administration of the State Parliament of Baden-Württemberg from 2007 until 2009.

== Political career ==
Maag first became a member of the Bundestag after the 2009 German federal election. She was a member of the Health Committee. From 2018, she served as her parliamentary group's spokeswoman on health policy.

In addition to her committee assignments, Maag was part of the German-Egyptian Parliamentary Friendship Group, the German-Indian Parliamentary Friendship Group and the German-Russian Parliamentary Friendship Group.

In the negotiations to form a coalition government under the leadership of Chancellor Angela Merkel following the 2017 federal elections, Maag was part of the working group on health policy, led by Hermann Gröhe, Georg Nüßlein and Malu Dreyer.

In April 2021, Maag announced that she would not stand in that year's federal elections but instead resign from active politics by the end of the parliamentary term.

== Other activities ==
=== Corporate boards ===
- Barmenia, Member of the Advisory Board

=== Non-profit organizations ===
- Foundation "Remembrance, Responsibility and Future", Member of the Board of Trustees
- Federal Agency for Civic Education (BPB), Alternate Member of the Board of Trustees (–2021)
- Humanitarian Aid Foundation for Persons infected with HIV through blood products (HIV Foundation), Chairwoman of the Board
- ZNS – Hannelore Kohl Stiftung, Member of the Advisory Board

== Political positions ==
In June 2017, Maag voted against Germany's introduction of same-sex marriage.

Ahead of the 2021 national elections, Maag endorsed Markus Söder as the Christian Democrats' joint candidate to succeed Chancellor Angela Merkel.
