= Gerda Herrmann =

German composer and poet (1931–2021)

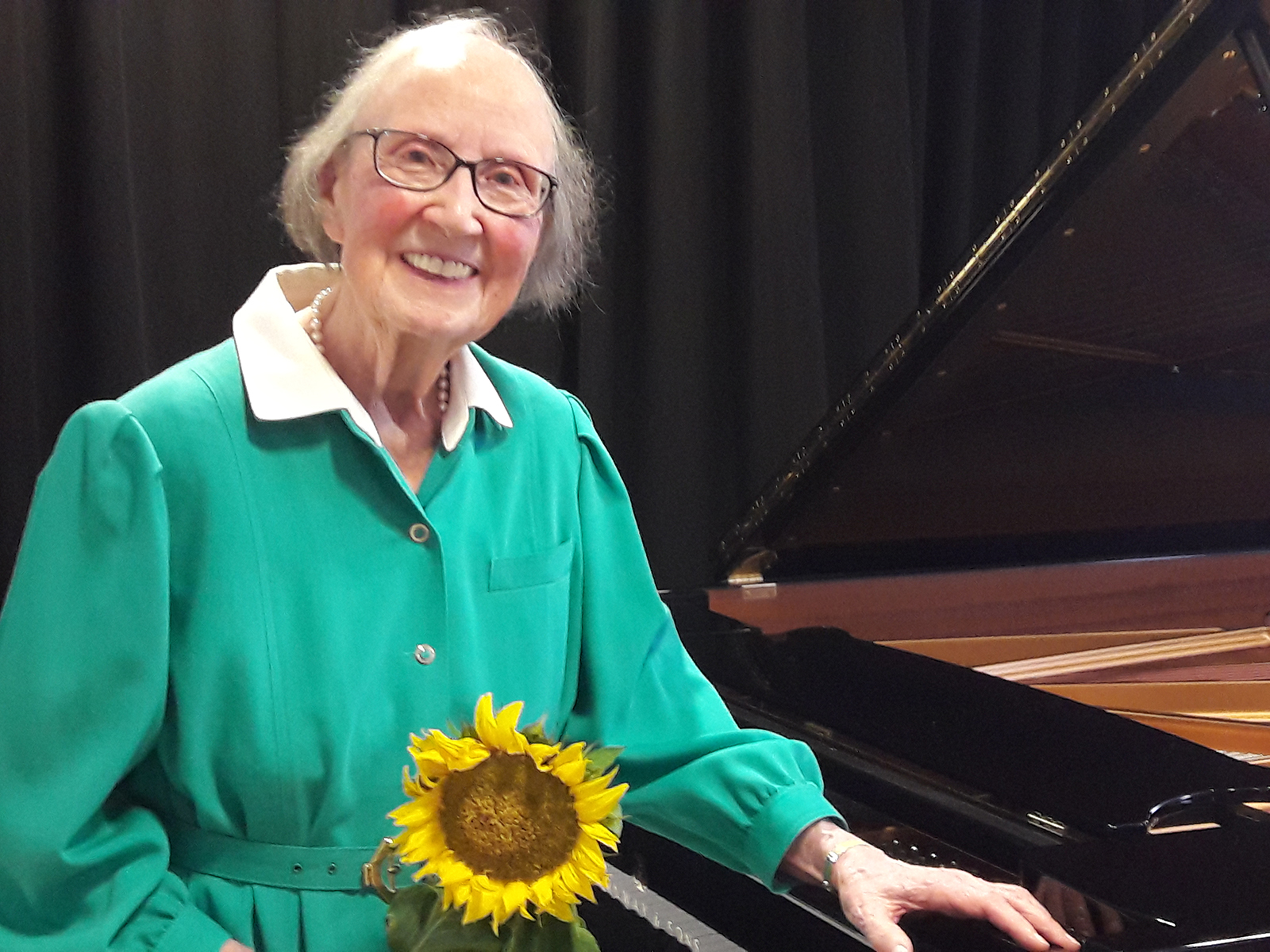
- Gerda Herrmann in October 2019
- Born: Gerda Herrmann; June 30, 1931; Cannstatt, Germany
- Died: April 15, 2021 (aged 89)
- Occupations: Composer, poet
- Years active: 1984–2021

Gerda Herrmann (June 30, 1931 in Cannstatt – April 15, 2021) was a German composer and poet. She had been living in Botnang since the 1960s and wrote more than 400 songs, setting to music both her own and other authors' lyrics. Many of her songs have been performed at 12 benefit concerts (as of 2019).

== Life and work ==
Gerda Herrmann received piano lessons for almost three years from 1941 to 1943, until her school was evacuated to Metzingen due to aerial bombings. From then on, she played the piano without receiving further lessons. Her father was an association auditor. After he was denounced to authorities, he was drafted into the German army and fell in 1944 as a soldier. In July 1944, Herrmann was in Stuttgart and at 13 years old witnessed the heavy bombings of the city and their aftermath.

In 1972, Herrmann wrote her first poem, when she was asked to write one for a service held at Friendenskirche Stuttgart in support of Amnesty International. In 1984, Gerda Herrmann wrote her first composition titled "Elegie". Since then, she set texts by many authors to music, among them Annette von Droste-Hülshoff, Joachim Ringelnatz, Arthur Schnitzler and Walther von der Vogelweide. In 2013, Herrmann set to music a love poem that her father had written into his diary in 1923. She remained active until the end, and in her last press interview published one week before her death in April 2021, Herrmann talked about the most recent song she was working on.

"Composing" is too high a level, I put texts to music.

— Gerda Herrmann

Herrmann herself described her style as "not modern", but "most likely to be classified as belonging to the romantic period". Additionally, her style became more simple in her old age, which she attributed to Angelus Silesius' quote "Human, focus on the essence". Herrmann regarded her song that sets Rilke's poem "Der Panther" to music as her favorite of her own songs. So far, many of Herrmann's songs have been performed at 12 benefit concerts in favor of various societies and organisations. The first concert took place in 1991 at Schloss Solitude.

She is delightful and charming, I love her stories and her songs (...). She is a wonderful soul, I love her and her passion for music, her optimism, her hopes for a better world and seeing the potential of music to heal and touch lives.

— Stephen Kalinich

In 2019, a documentary film The Songwriter of Botnang was made on Herrmann's life and oeuvre. It was shown in Germany and the U.S. and was additionally screened in competition at Berlin Independent Film Festival.

== Encouraging creative writing by young people ==
From 2003, until her death, Gerda Herrman was a founding member as well as deputy chairwoman of the Förderkreis Kreatives Schreiben und Musik, which publishes anthologies featuring texts by young people. The first anthology was published already before founding of the society, using parts of the proceeds from a benefit concert that showcased some of Herrmann's songs in the white hall of the New Palace in Stuttgart in 1999. The anthologies have been accepted to be recorded in the archive for children's texts of Martin-Luther-Universität Halle-Wittenberg and contain texts of different genres and styles. In 2010, a poem by Ingeborg Wenger from the anthology "ÜberBrücken" was displayed as part of the program "Lyrik Unterwegs" inside metro trains in Stuttgart. Herrmann set several poems from these anthologies to music.

== Further commitments ==
My credo is to neither lose courage nor humor!

— Gerda Herrmann

Additionally, from 1968 until the birth of her third child in 1972, Herrmann committed for Amnesty International and regards Amnesty's work as "important". She was a founding member of Group 49.
