= Esselte Leitz GmbH & Co KG =

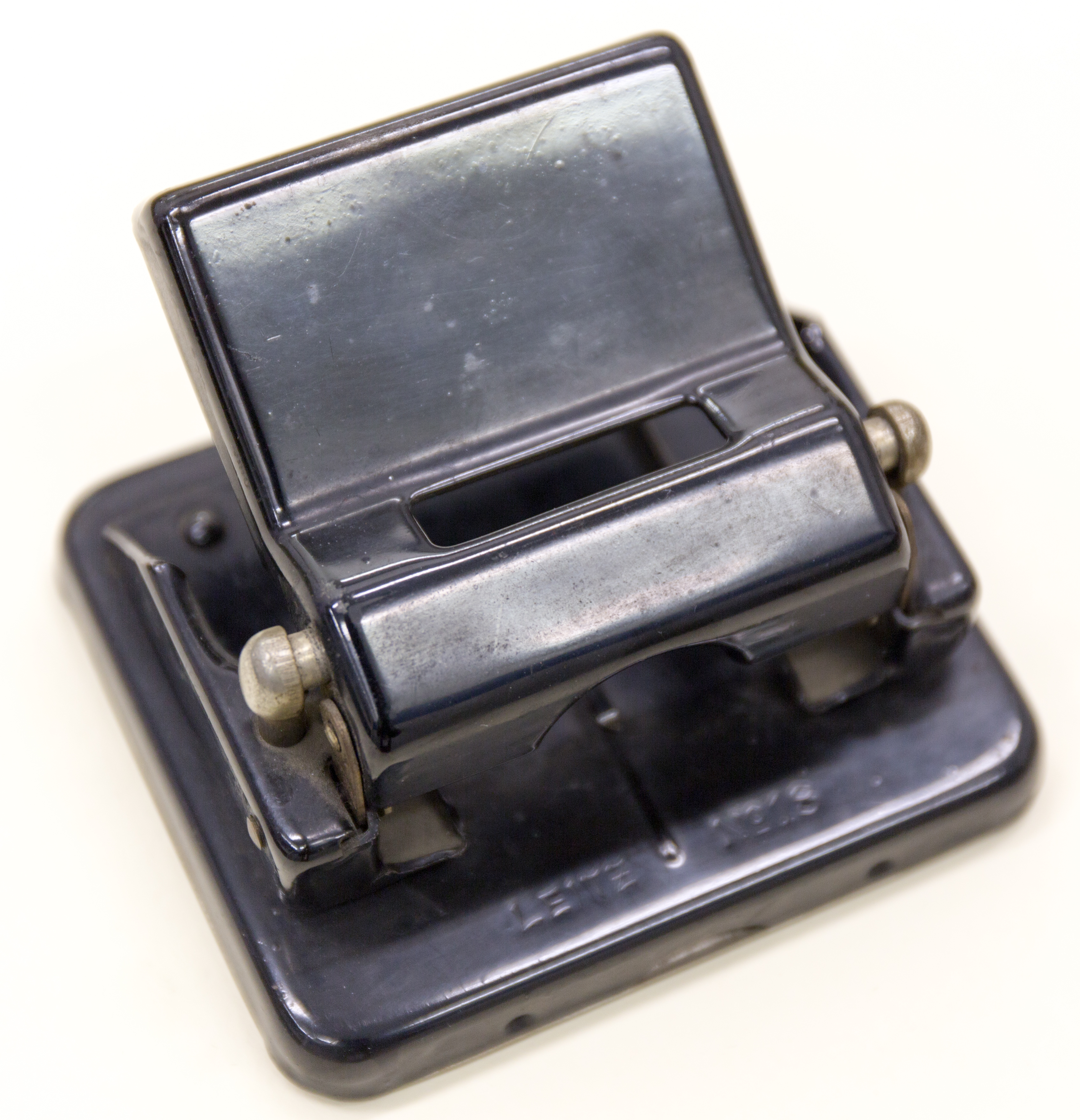
Hole punch from Leitz, currently at the Museum Europäischer Kulturen, Berlin

The LEITZ ACCO Brands GmbH & Co KG, also Leitz, is a German manufacturer of office products. The company, which is headquartered in Stuttgart, is owned by Esselte since 1998, who in turn were acquired by ACCO Brands in 2017. Today the brand Leitz is used by ACCO Brands mainly for filing and workspace products.

Leitz was founded by Louis Leitz.

In 1998, the company was acquired by the Esselte Group. At the time of the sale, the company had 2,500 employees and sales of 280 million euros. A large number of employees were laid off at the time.

In 2017, the ACCO Group acquired the Esselte Group from the private equity company J.W. Childs, which also includes the Leitz company, among others. As part of this, the name of the company "Esselte Leitz GmbH & Co KG" was changed to "LEITZ ACCO Brands GmbH & Co KG". At the time of the sale, Leitz had 455 employees with sales of 205.8 million euros.

== See also ==
- Leitz, unrelated German manufacturing firm founded by Albert Leitz in 1876 (www.leitz.org)
- Leica
