= Esselte =

Company

- Formerly: Sveriges Litografiska Tryckerier (until 1970)
- Founded: 1913; 113 years ago in Stockholm, Sweden
- Products: Office supplies
- Owner: ACCO Brands
- Subsidiaries: Leitz; Pendaflex
- Website: esselte.com

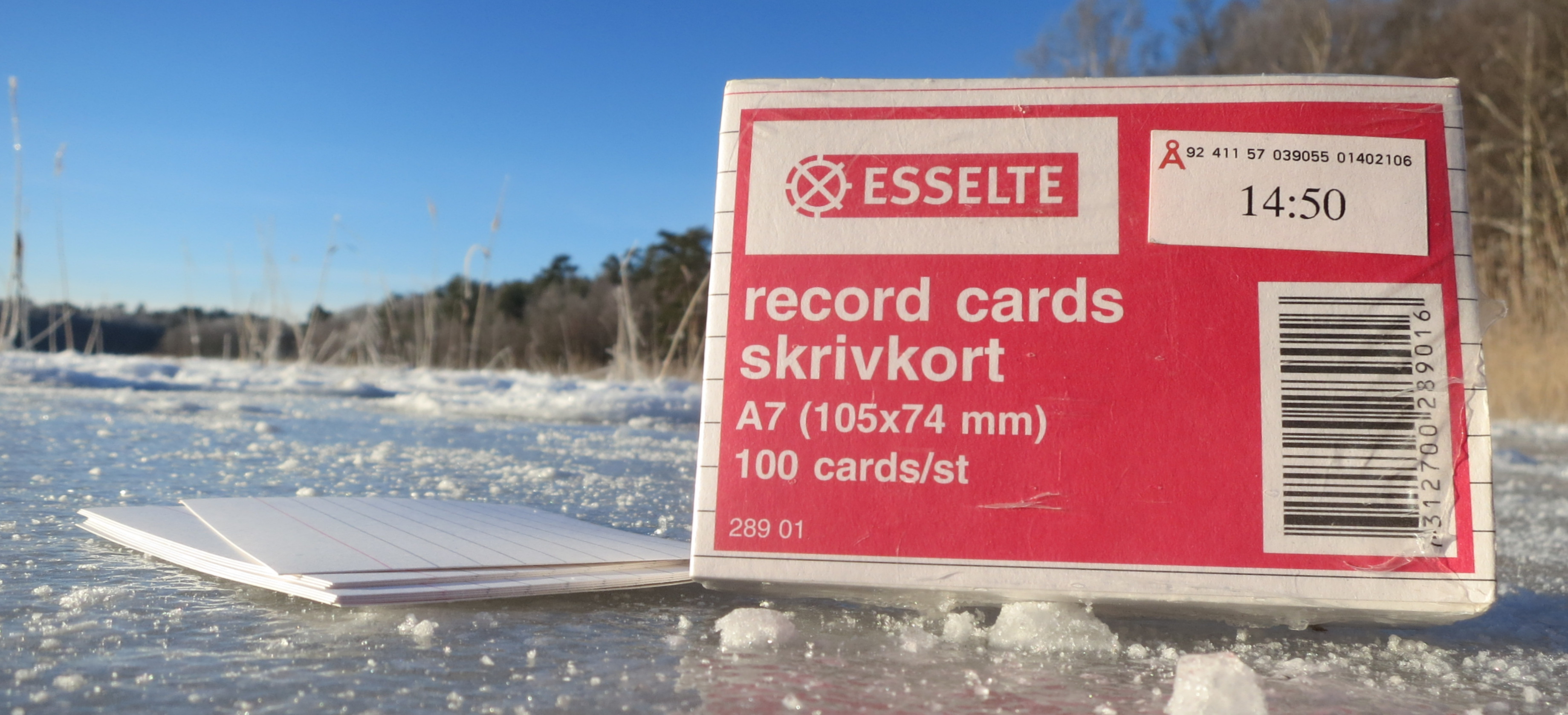
1990s Esselte record cards.

Esselte is a manufacturer and marketer of office products and business supplies with subsidiaries in 25 countries and sales in over 120 countries. Esselte makes files, binders, folders, covers, staplers, letter trays and computer accessories under the Esselte, Leitz, Oxford, Pendaflex, Rapid and Xyron brands. Customers range from wholesalers and direct marketers to office superstores and mass retailers.

Founded in 1913 in Stockholm, Sweden, Esselte is today owned by American office supplies manufacturer ACCO Brands.

== History ==
Founded in 1913, when 13 Swedish printing and graphic businesses joined forces to create the company Sveriges Litografiska Tryckerier—abbreviated SLT—in 1970, the company renamed itself Esselte, reflecting the pronunciation of the abbreviation. In 1986, Esselte built Filmstaden Downtown in Gothenburg and a cinema complex in Malmö. Two years later Esselte and Svensk Filmindustri (SF) formed a joint cinema company and in 1992 SF became the main owner. In 2002, the Boston, Massachusetts-based US private equity investment firm J. W. Childs Associates purchased Esselte for approximately $560 million in a transaction originated and introduced by Jonathan Slater of Sequel Management, a Boston-based transaction sponsor. At the time of the Esselte acquisition by J. W. Childs, the company was dual listed on the Stockholm and London Stock Exchanges and had revenues in excess of $1 billion.

In 2017, Esselte was acquired by ACCO Brands.

=== Acquisitions ===
In 1978, Esselte acquired the Dymo Corporation which grew to revenues of approximately $225 million by 2005 when it was sold to Newell Rubbermaid for approximately $730 million (more than 1.3 times the price J. W. Childs paid for Esselte itself back in 2002). In 1998, the company acquired Leitz, a leading German manufacturer of office products. In 2010, Esselte acquired Isaberg Rapid, a leading stapling company based in Sweden, and Ampad, a leading North American manufacturer of office products.
