= Stuttgart Media University =

University in Stuttgart

Coordinates: 48.7415°N 9.1014°E

University of Media
- Hochschule der Medien
- Motto: Studieren. Wissen. Machen.
- Motto in English: Study. Understand. Do.
- Type: Public
- Established: Fachschule für Buchdruckgewerbe Stuttgart: 1853; Hochschule der Medien: 2001
- Rector: Boris Alexander Kühnle
- Location: Stuttgart, Baden-Württemberg, Germany
- Website: www.hdm-stuttgart.de

The Stuttgart Media University or Media University (German: Hochschule der Medien) is a state university of media studies in Stuttgart, Germany, offering nearly 30 accredited bachelor's and master's degree programs within three faculties.

== History ==
The Stuttgart Media University was formed in 2001 by the union of the two former schools, the Hochschule für Druck und Medien (University for Print and Media) and the Hochschule für Bibliotheks-und Informationswesen (University for Library and Information System). One of the former schools, Hochschule für Druck und Medien founded in 1903, was based on an earlier technical school for printing founded in 1853 as the Fachschule für Buchdruckgewerbe Stuttgart. The other university, Hochschule für Bibliotheks-und Informationswesen, was founded in 1942 as Büchereifachschule Stuttgart. Both schools are now defunct after their union to Stuttgart Media University in 2001.

== Facilities ==
Stuttgart Media University is located on the Vaihingen campus in Stuttgart. The university operates from several academic buildings, including facilities for its three primary faculties: Print and Media, Electronic Media, and Information and Communication. These are supplemented by shared service units and infrastructure used for teaching and research activities. The central address is Nobelstraße 10.

=== Library ===
The university library, housed in Nobelstraße 8, covers approximately 1,200 m² and provides access to around 54,000 printed media and over 81,000 electronic resources. The library includes approximately 180 workspaces, group study rooms, a multimedia learning area, and access to databases, journals, and other academic publications.

=== Media Production Studios ===
The university maintains specialized production facilities across its faculties:

- TV and video studios, equipped with green-screen capabilities and multi-camera setups
- Photo studios featuring professional lighting systems
- Radio and podcast studios for audio production
- Computer labs loaded with professional design, editing, and broadcast software.

These facilities support both coursework and extracurricular student media projects.

=== Research and Technology Centers ===
The university hosts various research units, such as the Institute for Applied Research, the Institute for Digital Ethics, the Institute for Applied Artificial Intelligence and the Institute for Games. Technical laboratories are available for work in areas including printed electronics, digital mobility, and humanoid robots.

=== Student Services ===
Additional campus infrastructure includes a language center, a career service, and advisory offices for academic orientation. A dedicated start-up support unit is available for students involved in media-related business planning.

== Majors ==
The university offers bachelor's and master's degree programs in three faculties:

- Faculty of Printing and Media
- Faculty of Electronic Media
- Faculty of Information and Communication

It also offers a doctorate in collaboration with partner universities.

Programs
Bachelor	Master
Print and Media
German-Chinese degree programm Media and technology (Bachelor of Engineering); Integrated Product Design (Bachelor of Arts); Media Publishing (Bachelor of Arts); Computer Science and Media (Bachelor of Science); Mobile Media (Bachelor of Science); Print Media Technologies (Bachelor of Engineering); Packaging Technology (Bachelor of Engineering); Media Engineering (Bachelor of Science)	Computer Science and Media (Master of Science); Crossmedia Publishing & Management (Master of Arts); Digital Design (Master of Arts); Packaging Development Management (Master of Science)
Electronic Media
Audiovisual Media (Bachelor of Engineering); Cross Media Public Relations (Bachelor of Arts); Digital and Media Business (Bachelor of Arts); Media and Business Psychology (Bachelor of Science); Advertising and Marketing Communication (Bachelor of Arts)	Audiovisual Media (Master of Engineering); Master of Media Research (Master of Arts); Media Management (Master of Arts); Corporate Communication (Master of Arts); Intrapreneurship and Entrepreneurship (Master of Business Engineering, extra-occupational program)
Information and Communication
Information Design (Bachelor of Arts); Information Sciences (Bachelor of Arts); Online Media Management (Bachelor of Arts); Information Systems and Digital Media (Bachelor of Science)	Information Systems (Master of Science); Business Management (Master of Business Administration, extra-occupational program); Data Science and Business Analytics (Master of Science, extra-occupational program)

== Institutes ==
The Institut für Angewandte Forschung (Institute for Applied Research, IAR) bundles the research activities of Stuttgart Media University, ranging from printed electronics to information design and applied artificial intelligence. Since 2005, the IAR has coordinated more than 200 externally funded projects throughout Media Technologies and social media fields, integrating research with teaching.

Since 2011, the university's Start-Up Center supports students who want to start and manage a business.

The following research lighthouses are currently established:

- Institute for Applied Artificial Intelligence (IAAI)
- Seamless interaction in immersive environments (STRIVE)
- Innovative applications of printing technologies (IAD)
- Information Experience Design Research Group (IXD)
- Institute for Games (IfG)
- Creative Industries, Entrepreneurship and Media Society (CREAM)
- Interaction Design and User Experience (IDUX)
- Institute for Digital Ethics (IDE)
- Learning Research Centre (LRC)
- Institute for Natural Product Processing (INV)

== Research ==
Stuttgart Media University conducts applied and interdisciplinary research through its Institute for Applied Research (IAR) and multiple specialized institutes. Its research is organized into two broad areas:

- Media Technologies, encompassing fields such as printed and digital electronics, artificial intelligence, and interactive media systems including humanoid robots
- Media Ethics and Social Sciences, which focuses on the social, legal, economic, and ethical aspects of media and digital transformation.

Notable research facilities and institutes include:

- Technology Center for Print-Media Technology (PMT): A center performing research on printed electronics, industrial printing, packaging, 3D printing, and future technologies, supported by industry-grade equipment.
- Information Experience & Design (IXD) Research Group: Studies user-centred design and human-centred AI, collaborating with regional SMEs to enhance wellbeing and usability.
- Institute for Games: Conducts applied, empirical, and educational game research in conjunction with schools, public institutions, and industry partners.
- Institute for Applied Artificial Intelligence: Strives to bring AI into application, thus bridging the gap between research on the one hand and enterprises and society on the other. By keeping track, assessing recent research and understanding its potential for enterprise applications, the IAAI will helpsto establish AI as key future technology.

HdM houses research infrastructure including labs for printed electronics, AI, humanoid robotics, mobility innovation, digital media and usability—primarily located in its Vaihingen campus buildings.

== Alumni ==
Among the notable alumni of the Stuttgart Media University or its predecessors are Arek Gielnik, the producer of Neukölln Unlimited, and Jörn Grosshans, who won a 2013 Hollywood Post Alliance Award for the outstanding visual effects in Game of Thrones (season 3).
