= Botnang =

- Borough of Stuttgart
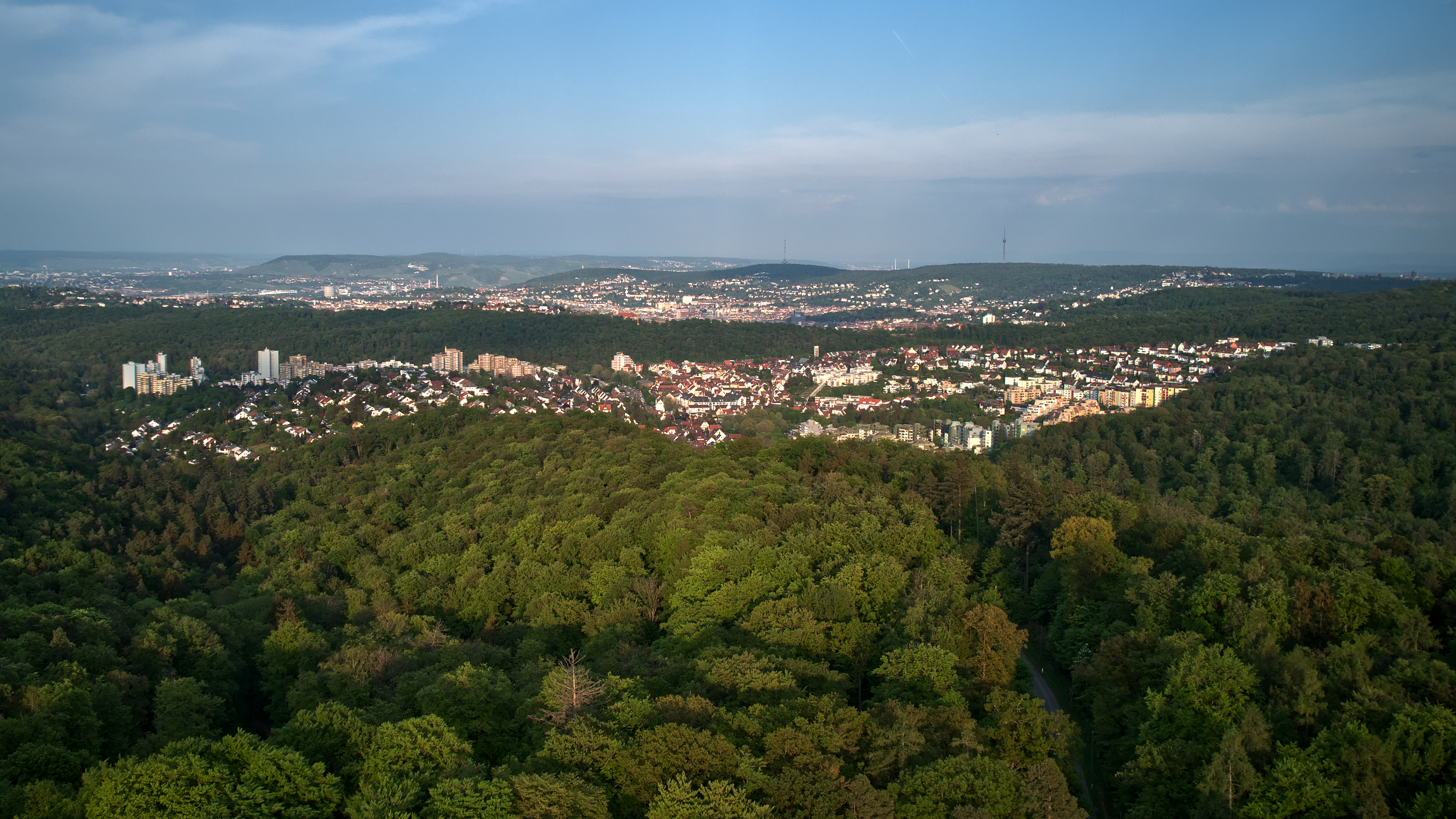

- Coat of arms

- Location within Stuttgart
- Interactive map of Botnang
- Location within Germany Location within Baden-Württemberg
- Coordinates: 48°46′N 9°8′E
- Country: Germany
- State: Baden-Württemberg
- Admin. region: Stuttgart
- District: Urban district
- City: Stuttgart

Area
  - Total: 2.135 km^{2} (0.824 sq mi)
- Elevation: 357 m (1,171 ft)

Population (2020-12-31)
  - Total: 13,108
  - Density: 6,140/km^{2} (15,900/sq mi)
- Time zone: UTC+01:00 (CET)
  - Summer (DST): UTC+02:00 (CEST)
- Postal codes: 70195
- Dialling codes: 0711
- Vehicle registration: S
- Website: stuttgart.de

Botnang (German pronunciation: [ˈboːtnaŋ]; formerly Bothnang) is a borough of the City of Stuttgart and lies between Feuerbach, Stuttgart-West and Vaihingen.

== Geography ==
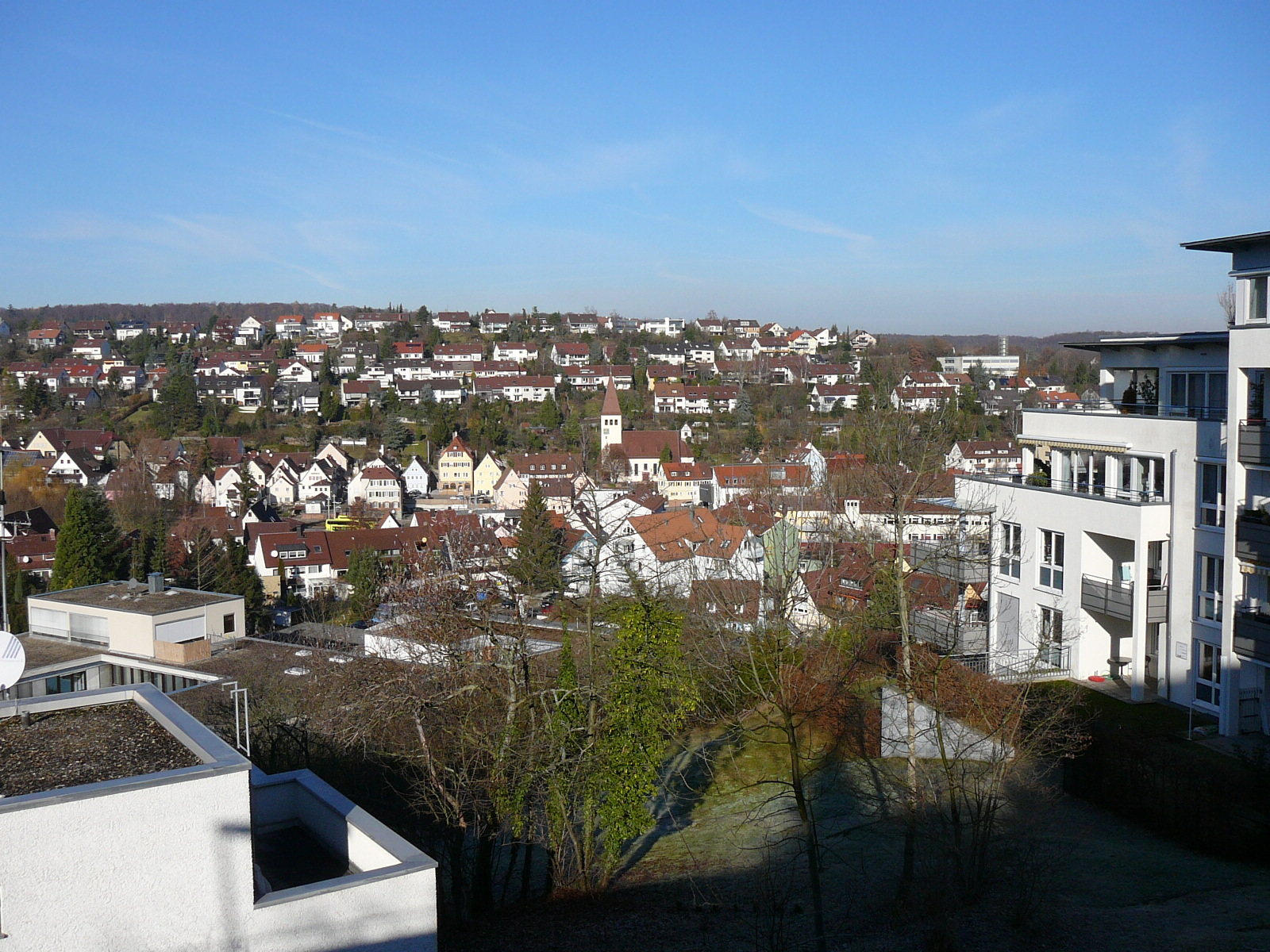
View of Botnang.

Botnang is almost entirely surrounded by woodland and lies in the hills to the west of Stuttgart. The centre of Botnang lies 316 metres above sea level. The town's highest point is 479 metres above sea level in woods near to the so-called Forest House. Four streams, all fed by natural sources, flow down from the surrounding woods from the West and South West of Botnang to the Feuerbach valley and beyond.

== Coat of arms ==
The Botnang coat of arms shows a wild boar between two trees (believed to be beech trees). The emblem was created in 1919 after discovering in district archives that the town boasted neither a coat of arms nor any other emblem. It was designed by archive managers in Stuttgart and symbolizes the wild game reserve originally established by King Friedrich in the woods around the town in 1815/16. The coat of arms holds no official status since Botnang's incorporation into Stuttgart City in 1922, but still features prominently on signs, in local buildings and in publications. Wild boar still roam the woods around Botnang, especially during prolonged periods of cold.

The emblem considered by many locals to symbolize Botnang more accurately is the cuckoo. It is used half affectionately, half mockingly by residents and nearby communities respectively to refer to Botnang and its inhabitants. This is based on a legend that the Duke of Württemberg once asked the 'Botnangers' to acquire him a cuckoo after walking in the nearby woods. Having fulfilled his request they were then asked to bring him the "Home of the Cuckoo". Unable to decide whether this was based on ignorance or was in fact a trick (cuckoos have no nest; they lay their eggs in other birds' nests), the Botnangers gave the duke an area of their woods - much to the derision of other local communities.

== History ==
Nearly 2000 years ago two important Roman roads travelled through the area near to the modern Forest House behind today's Oberer Kirchhaldenweg. This may be because of a small pot making community that stood to the east of the settlement.

Botnang is first mentioned in official records in 1075 when the local landlords, the Counts of Calw, bequeathed their property and all revenues from Botnang to Hirsau Abbey. In 1281, Hirsau sold its ownership of Botnang to Bebenhausen Monastery. In 1418, Botnang was acquired by Eberhard im Bart and thus passed into Württemberg. Until 1631 Botnang then fell into the nearby district of Feuerbach.

The Thirty Years War brought much suffering and destruction to the area and this also affected Botnang. In 1621 the combined population of Botnang and the nearby town of Heslach was 645, by 1643 this had slumped to 210.

In 1765, Karl Eugen, Duke of Württemberg built Castle Solitude just beyond the woodland surrounding Botnang. Many of the craftsman involved in construction work took up residence in Botnang. The links to Castle Solitude, which now belongs to the district of Stuttgart-West, remain strong to this day.

Before the onset of industrialisation Botnang was known as a small township of launderers and bleachers. The woods benefitted from ample provisions of firewood and water so Botnang was in an ideal position to furnish the needs of the expanding city of Stuttgart. For many years the south facing hills also supported a small number of vineyards.

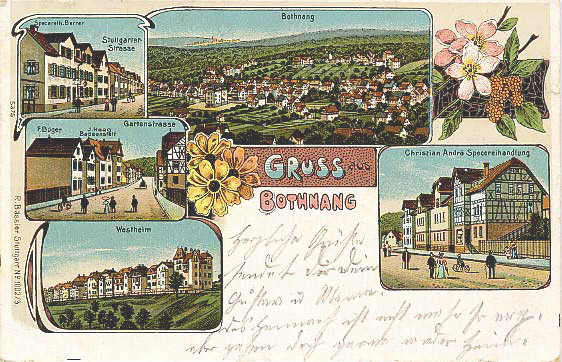

After the industrial revolution transformed the nearby city of Stuttgart into a major automotive city, Botnang gradually merged with the expanding commuter belt of Stuttgart, separated only by the surrounding woods which remain under a conservation order to this day. The town is therefore unlikely to grow beyond its current borders. On April 1, 1922 Botnang was incorporated into the city of Stuttgart. In 1925 Botnang had 4579 inhabitants. In 2006 the town had approximately 13,000 inhabitants.

=== Religion ===
Botnang formed part of the parish of Feuerbach until the 15th century. In 1483 it became autonomous and established its own rectory. In 1530 the town was embraced by the Reformation. The oldest register of births in Botnang dates back to 1558.

=== Incorporation into the Urban District of Stuttgart ===
Botnang was affiliated to the parish of Feuerbach until 1483 and remained politically linked to Feuerbach until 1631. On April 1, 1922 Botnang was officially incorporated into Stuttgart.

Until 1942, Castle Solitude and its entire residence remained under the jurisdiction of the district of Gerlingen (now officially the town of Gerlingen). On April 1, 1942 the palace was also incorporated into the Urban District of Stuttgart and re-designated to the District of Botnang.

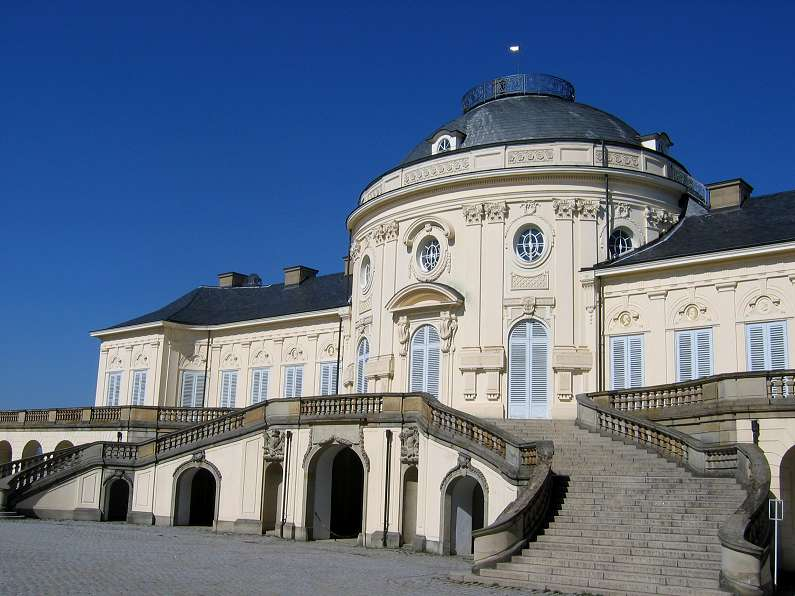
Schloss Solitude

In 1956, Stuttgart was divided into City Districts resulting in the re-designation of Solitude residences under the District of Stuttgart-West. Botnang was declared once again an independent urban district and this was unaffected by changes in district boundaries on January 1, 2001. The District of Botnang thus remains an individual urban district under the overall jurisdiction of the Urban District of Stuttgart.

== Economy and infrastructure ==
=== Public transportation ===
Botnang lies to the east of the L 1187 (Wildparkstraße) which forms the main road link between Stuttgart and Leonberg. The Wildparkstraße is also an important access road to the nearby State Autobahn (motorways), the A81 and A8. Local transport is operated by Stuttgarter Straßenbahnen AG. This encompasses

Light rail services:

- U2 Neugereut – Bad Cannstatt – Stöckach – Charlottenplatz – Rotebühlplatz – Vogelsang – Botnang
- U9 Hedelfingen – Raitelsberg – Hauptbahnhof – Vogelsang (– Botnang)
  limited services during school holidays and outside rush hours

Bus:

- 91 Sindelfingen – Vaihingen – Botnang – Feuerbach
- N2 Schlossplatz – Botnang – Schlossplatz (Fr/Sa/Su nights)

=== Schools in Botnang ===
Primary schools: Franz-Schubert school, Kirchhalden school Senior schools: Evangelische Fachschule für Sozialpädagogik

== People, culture and architecture ==
=== Local architecture ===
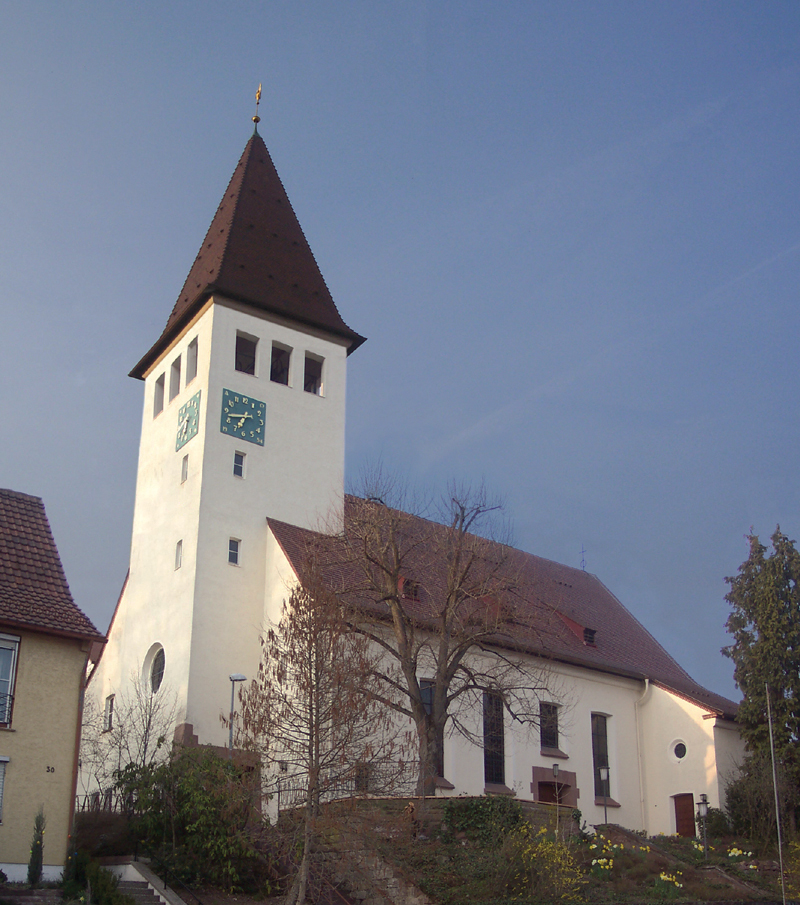
Auferstehungskirche

The Auferstehungskirche (Church of the Resurrection) stands proudly on the hill over Eltinger Straße and is considered a symbol of "old Botnang". It is therefore often pictured on post cards and publications on the town. Following the second world war the church was built on the former site of the old village church and was completed in 1954.

=== Regular events ===
Every summer a street festival is organised by club members of A.R.G.E. Botnang. This takes place on the streets along Marktplatz/Griegstraße/Franz-Schubert-Straße on the last Saturday before schools break up for the summer holidays.

The A.R.G.E. also organises an annual Christmas Market held on the Saturday preceding the 1st Advent. Until 2005 this always took place on Alte-Stuttgarter-Straße. In 2006 the Christmas Market moved to Griegstraße.

The Lantern Procession takes place annually in the middle of October and attracts up to 800 participants. The procession takes place in two waves through the decorated old town of Botnang, culminating on the open area next to the sports hall with a bonfire.

== Notable people from Botnang ==
Jürgen Klinsmann was manager of the Germany national football team from 2004 until 2006. During his playing career he was part of the German squads that won the FIFA World Cup in 1990 and UEFA European Football Championship in 1996. Klinsmann grew up in Botnang where his family ran the Klinsmann bakery until 2020.

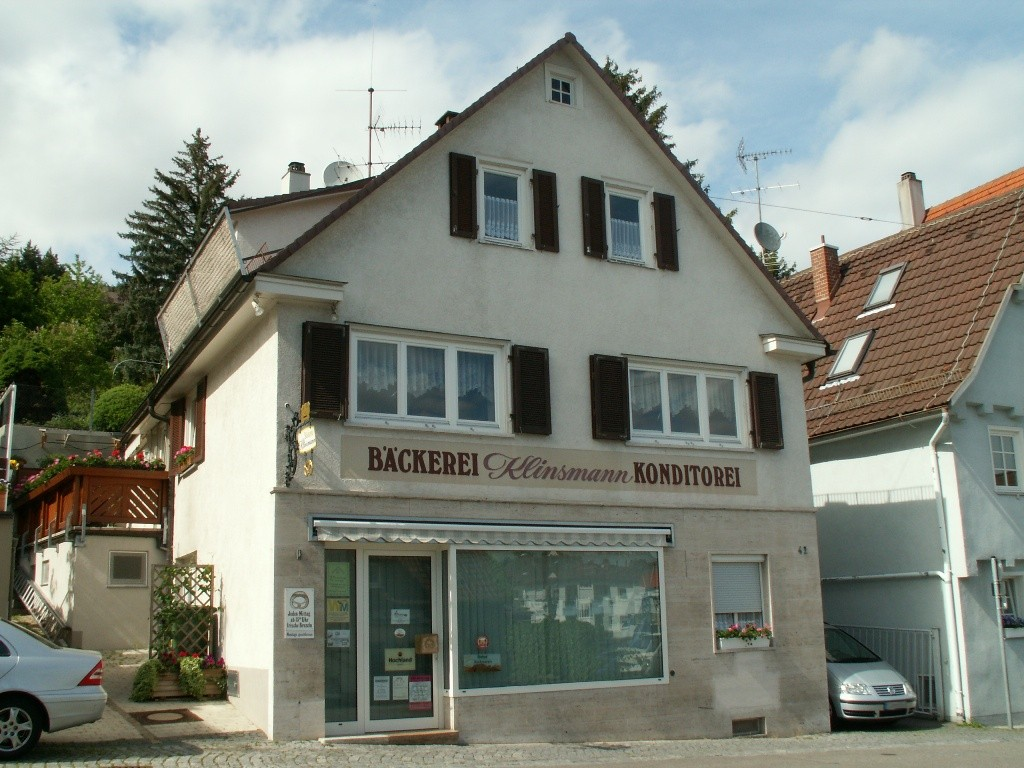
The Klinsmann Bakery

Ulf Merbold, German physicist and the first West German astronaut.

Gerda Herrmann, a German poet and composer, has been living in Botnang since the 1960s and has composed almost 400 songs there.

== Politics ==
The District Council of Botnang has 11 members. Following local elections in 2004 the seats were divided as follows: CDU 4, SPD 3, Bündnis 90 / The Greens 1, FDP 1, FW (Freie Wähler) 2. The Head of the District Council is Wolfgang Stierle.
