= Samantha Daniels =

American matchmaker, television producer, author, and entrepreneur

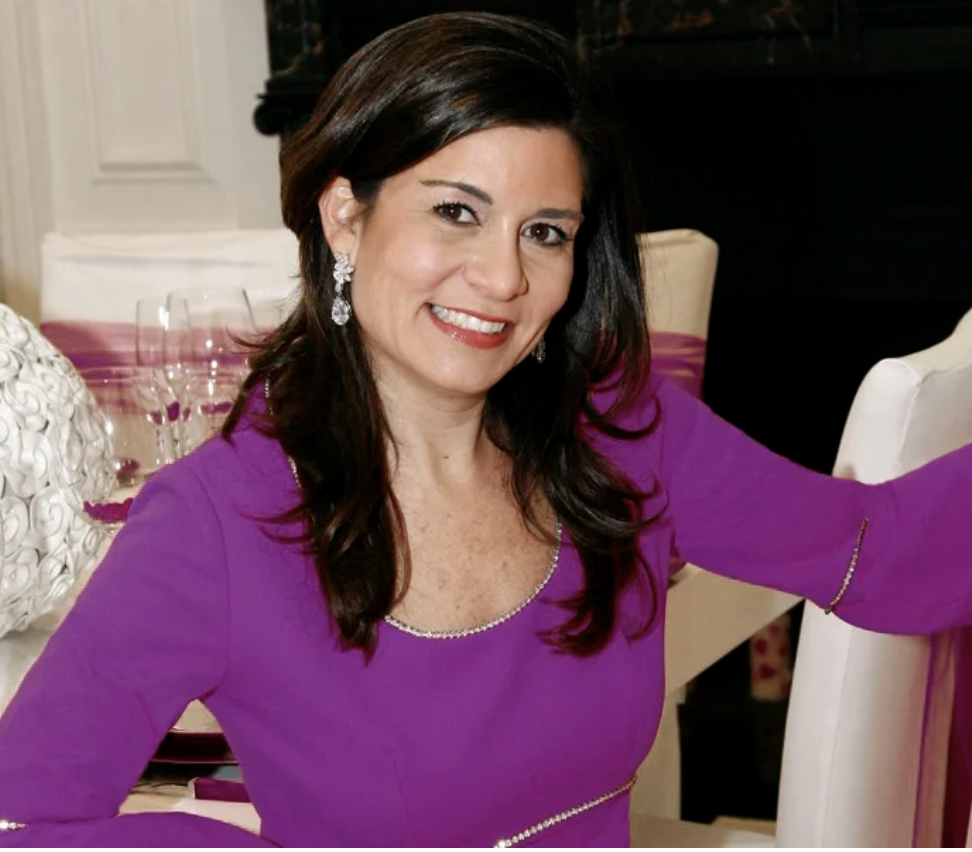
- Occupation: Matchmaker
- Organization: Matchbook
- Website: www.samanthadaniels.info

Samantha Daniels is an American matchmaker, dating expert, entrepreneur, and television personality. She is the founder of Samantha’s Table, a luxury matchmaking service based in New York and Los Angeles.

== Career ==
=== Early career ===
Daniels is a former matrimonial attorney with an Ivy League education. As a lawyer, she dealt with divorce and the aftermath of those breakups, but at the same time, according to Forbes, she also hosted social and networking events for singles. In 1999, she began a new career as a professional matchmaker and founded Samantha's Table, a matchmaking service in New York City. According to Daniels' website, her clients are people who have no problem dating but want to find that one person with whom they can spend their lives, and Daniels strives to help them get into "meaningful long-lasting relationships".

=== Matchmaking ===
In 1999, Daniels founded Samantha's Table, a matchmaking service in New York City Forbes states that Daniels' is known for her privacy and discretion; her clientele consists of people mostly in the fields of "finance, the professions, or entertainment." In 2004, Daniels expanded her business to the Los Angeles market to meet the rising Hollywood and celebrity demand. Although based in New York City and Los Angeles, Daniels clients are from cities across the US and abroad. Rothman's Magazine feature on Daniels reports that she is "responsible for over 100 marriages and thousands of substantial relationships."

=== Television ===
==== Miss Match ====
Daniels career as a matchmaker and a former matrimonial attorney was the basis for NBC's show Miss Match starring Alicia Silverstone and produced by Darren Star. In 2003, Daniels sold her life rights to Darren Star Productions, Inc. Daniels produced the dramedy with Star in conjunction with Imagine Entertainment and Twentieth Century Fox and it aired on NBC in 2004. Miss Match followed the story of a matrimonial attorney, Kate Fox, who "moonlighted as a high-end matchmaker and had visions of one day retiring from the law to focus her full-time efforts on matchmaking." The role of Kate Fox, based on Daniels, was played by Alicia Silverstone Miss Match also starred Lake Bell, David Conrad, Jodi Long, James Roday, and Ryan O'Neal. The show was nominated for a Golden Globe by the Hollywood Foreign Press Association and airs via syndication

==== On-air personality ====
Daniels reports on relationships, dating, fashion, and celebrity/pop-culture news on live television programs. She has been a national spokesperson and appeared in marketing campaigns for consumer products and brands such as Crest, Oral B, and Febreze.

=== Internet ===
Daniels is a writer for The Huffington Post, where she contributes a column entitled "Matchmaker in the Know." She also hosts a web series, Relationship Chatter, that airs on over 25 different portals online, three times a week. Daniels participates in web chats and seminars in other multimedia.

=== Book ===
In 2005, Daniels authored Matchbook: the Diary of a Modern-Day Matchmaker, published by Simon & Schuster. It tells the story of a single divorce attorney turned matchmaker, her clients, and her search for "Mr. Right." Matchbook was sold in 30 countries and was translated into three different languages.
