= Daniel Weaver =

Daniel Weaver may refer to:

- Daniel Weaver, a founder of Fremont, Michigan
- Dan Weaver, television series character, see list of Falling Skies characters
- Daniel Weaver (MP) for Ballynakill (Parliament of Ireland constituency)
- Daniel Weaver (actor), see List of Greek (TV series) characters
- Daniel Weaver, finalist in Mister World 1998
