= Scarecrow Slayer =

- Directed by: David Michael Latt
- Written by: Bill Cunningham
- Produced by: Emmanuel Itier
- Starring: Tony Todd; Todd Rex; David Castro; Steven Schultz
- Music by: Vincent Golliaz
- Release date: August 12, 2003
- Running time: 86 minutes or 90 minutes
- Country: United States
- Language: English

Scarecrow Slayer is a 2003 American direct-to-video slasher film produced by The Asylum. It is a sequel to the 2002 film Scarecrow. The film was a direct-to-video release, as well as its predecessor, and its 2004 sequel Scarecrow Gone Wild.

The film was directed by David Michael Latt, who also wrote the screenplay for the film. The film stars Tony Todd, Nicole Kingston, and David Castro.

== Plot ==
Caleb Kilgore (Tony Todd) is a farmer who has been obsessed with a scarecrow that killed his father (Michael Flowers Jr) years ago. Two friends looking to join a fraternity are given the initiation task of stealing the scarecrow from Caleb's field. After his father's murder, Caleb had caught the scarecrow and tied it down so that it could never escape.

When Caleb sees the friends, including a guy named Dave (Brett Erickson), moving the scarecrow, Caleb shoots the scarecrow, not knowing that Dave is beneath the scarecrow. Dave dies, and his soul is transferred into that of the scarecrow...and then the scarecrow kills Caleb.

Dave, in the form of the scarecrow, decides that he wants his old girlfriend Mary back. But Mary is dating a college student, so the scarecrow kills the student. Mary decides to get help from some friends who are in an ROTC unit in a military academy.

The ROTC guys have access to an arsenal of weapons, but that doesn't stop the scarecrow, and he kills them all. The scarecrow is willing to kill anyone who gets in the way of turning Mary into a scarecrow too so that they can be together forever.

Finally, a friend of Dave's from the academy named Karl (David Castro) inadvertently becomes a scarecrow, and fights the Dave scarecrow. The Dave scarecrow wins the fight, but then Mary blows him to pieces with a rocket-launcher and walks away smiling, relieved that the nightmare is finally over.

== Cast ==
- Tony Todd as Caleb Kilgore
  - David Dillon as Young Caleb Kilgore
- Todd Rex as The Scarecrow
- Michael Flowers Jr as Orson Kilgore
- Brett Erickson as Dave
- David Castro as Karl
- Nicole Kingston as Mary Anderson
- Elizabeth Perry as Judy
- Robin Dale Meyers as Interviewer Kim
- Tami Sheffield as Nurse Mandy
- D.C. Douglas as Dr. Baxter
- Scott Carson as Sheriff Deputy Larry Lane
- Kim Little as Sheriff Deputy Rachel Lane
- Shannon Young as Ruby
- Jessica Mattson as Sheila
- Steven Schultz as Gavin
- Brendan Aucoin as Rick
- Jonathan Murphy as Jobin
- Mark Irvingsen as Bob
- Steven Glinn as Bartlett
- Scott Parietti as White

== Distribution ==
Scarecrow Slayer was coupled with the first film as Scarecrow/Scarecrow Slayer on 28 December 2004.

== Reception ==
One review states: "Director David Michael Latt shoots a movie that at least resembles what you would expect a professional low budget horror movie to look like". Another reviewer commented: "Overall, this film is nothing like the previous film and offers no real entertainment".
