= Death Tunnel =

- Film poster
- Directed by: Philip Adrian Booth
- Written by: Christopher Saint Booth; Philip Adrian Booth
- Produced by: Christopher Saint Booth; Shane Dax Taylor
- Starring: Steffany Huckaby; Annie Burgstede; Kristin Novak; Jason Lasater
- Cinematography: Philip Adrian Booth; Marcel Cabrera; Roberto Correa
- Edited by: Philip Adrian Booth
- Music by: Christopher Saint Booth
- Distributed by: Sony Pictures Home Entertainment (US); Columbia TriStar Home Video (UK)
- Release date: October 17, 2005; https://fliphtml5.com/myzlx/csia/SCREAMFEST_2005/8/
- Running time: 91 min.
- Country: United States
- Language: English

Death Tunnel is a 2005 horror movie filmed at the Waverly Hills Sanatorium. It stars Steffany Huckaby, Annie Burgstede, Kristin Novak and Jason Lasater.

== Plot ==
Heather attends a college initiation party with her new friend Tori. Heather, Tori, Ashley, Devon, and Elizabeth are selected for an initiation stunt at an abandoned sanatorium. The five women are placed separately throughout the building and challenged to remain there for five hours. Richie, who organized the prank, monitors them through cameras while his accomplices attempt to frighten them.

The situation becomes dangerous when supernatural activity begins occurring throughout the sanatorium. The women encounter apparitions connected to the hospital's past and the students organizing the initiation realize that the building is actually haunted.

As the night progresses, the women discover that they have personal connections to people associated with the sanatorium's history.

Once inside the sanatorium, the women begin experiencing events that are not part of Richie's planned scares.

Richie and the others monitoring the women gradually realize that something has gone wrong and that the danger inside the sanatorium is real.

As the night continues, the women become separated and are attacked by supernatural forces within the sanatorium. They begin discovering connections between themselves and people associated with the hospital's past. Meanwhile, Richie attempts to intervene after realizing that the events are no longer part of the initiation prank.

As the group is killed one by one, Heather and Richie attempt to escape from the sanatorium. Their search for a way out leads them into the underground tunnel once used to transport bodies away from the hospital. Heather ultimately discovers that her connection to Waverly Hills is more personal than she had realized, as the supernatural events surrounding her are tied to the sanatorium's past.

== Cast ==
- Steffany Huckaby – Heather
- Melanie Lewis – Devon
- Yolan Percerero – Elizabeth
- Kristin Novak – Ashley
- Annie Burgstede – Tori
- Jason Lasater – Richie
- Gary Wolf – Gio
- Robyn Corum – Leah
- Gill Gayle – Professor
- Brian Dyer – Dr. Vanguard
- Reenie Varga – Spinal Nurse
- Jilon Ghai – Mason
- Jesse Bernstein – Cameron
- George W. Harr Jr. – Death in Sanatorium
- B.J. Winslow – Death in Morgue
- Joan Farrell – Traci

== Production ==
Death Tunnel was filmed at the Waverly Hills Sanatorium in Louisville, Kentucky. The film was also dedicated to all the Lost Souls of Waverly Hills Sanatorium. May You Find Your Way Home!"

The idea to film at Waverly Hills originated with producer and co-writer Shane Dax Taylor, a Louisville native who had visited the abandoned sanatorium as a teenager. Taylor later introduced Philip Adrian Booth and Christopher Saint Booth to the location. After receiving permission to film there, the filmmakers researched the history of Waverly Hills through libraries, online sources, and interviews with the property's owners and local historians.

== Release ==
Death Tunnel screened at the Screamfest Horror Film Festival on October 17, 2005.

== Reception ==
Death Tunnel received generally negative reviews from critics. Andrew Kasch of Dread Central gave the film 1.5 out of 5 stars, criticizing its structure, pacing, performances, and editing.

David Nusair of Reel Film Reviews gave it 0.5 out of 4 stars and criticized the film's lack of atmosphere and tension despite its use of Waverly Hills Sanatorium as a filming location.

On Rotten Tomatoes, the film has an approval rating of 0% based on five reviews.
