= Return to Paradise (1998 film) =

1998 film by Joseph Ruben

- Theatrical release poster
- Directed by: Joseph Ruben
- Screenplay by: Wesley Strick; Bruce Robinson
- Based on: Force majeure by Pierre Jolivet; Olivier Schatzky
- Produced by: David Arnold; Ezra Swerdlow
- Starring: Vince Vaughn; Anne Heche; Joaquin Phoenix; David Conrad; Jada Pinkett Smith
- Cinematography: Reynaldo Villalobos
- Edited by: Craig McKay; Andrew Mondshein
- Music by: Mark Mancina
- Production company: Propaganda Films
- Distributed by: PolyGram Filmed Entertainment
- Release date: August 14, 1998
- Running time: 112 minutes
- Country: United States
- Language: English
- Budget: $14 million
- Box office: $8.3 million

Return to Paradise is a 1998 American drama-thriller film directed by Joseph Ruben, written by Wesley Strick and Bruce Robinson, and starring Vince Vaughn, Anne Heche, and Joaquin Phoenix. Return to Paradise is a remake of the 1989 French film Force majeure. The film had its premiere on August 10, 1998, and was released to theaters on August 14, 1998 by PolyGram Filmed Entertainment.

It is the first film on-screen collaboration between Vaughn and Heche, the second film being Psycho, which was released in the same year.

== Plot ==
Three friends, Lewis McBride, Sheriff and Tony, are vacationing in Malaysia. Their adventures include being almost run over by a car while riding a bicycle, and being pressured into buying some rhinoceros horn from Malaysian locals. They also purchase a large bag of hash from a local drug dealer. The three men wind up at their beachfront house on the ocean pondering their future in the island paradise. Tony and Sheriff decide to return to New York City, while Lewis, being a "greenie", wishes to travel to Borneo to save endangered orangutans. On the last day of their vacation, they throw away the remaining hash. As time passes, Sheriff now works as a limo driver while Tony is a successful architect.

Beth, an up-and-coming lawyer, informs them that Lewis has spent the last two years in Penang prison in Malaysia, because of hash found at their Malaysian house. Beth reveals that Lewis will receive the death sentence unless one or both of the men return to share responsibility. She assures both of them that they will not suffer in prison, be tortured, or harmed in any way. After a gruelling eight days, during which they must make a decision, Beth and Sheriff begin a heated love affair, and both men decide to return to Malaysia. Upon their arrival, all seems well until they visit the prison to see Lewis.

Lewis appears to have suffered psychological damage from the harsh imprisonment, although it is reported that he has not been tortured or starved as is the case with other prisoners. Beth subsequently reveals that she is Lewis' sister and has been blatantly manipulating the two men. Her lie makes Tony fearful of the Malaysian justice system, so he abandons Lewis and flies back to the US. Sheriff initially follows Tony, but decides to face jail to save his friend and returns to the courtroom in which Lewis is being tried.

The judge seems heartened by this act of courage, until he discovers a news clipping from an American newspaper blaming the Malaysian justice system and condemning them for their harsh sentencing of Lewis. Because of this, he becomes infuriated and gives Lewis a death sentence, despite Sheriff's decision to accept his share of the responsibility. He also gives Sheriff an unknown period of jail time.

As Lewis is taken to his execution, Sheriff hears his screams and struggles. From a window, he is able to call to him, to assure him repeatedly that he is not alone. Just before he is hanged, Lewis calms in response to these assurances and dies quietly.

Sheriff assures Beth that Lewis, despite his emotional deterioration, seemed at peace in his final moments. She becomes emotional and kisses Sheriff as a sign of their love and connection. Beth tells him that the attorney general has said that the Malaysian government will quietly release him within six months, once the media attention dies down, to save face. As the guard takes Sheriff out, Beth says that she will take her brother back home and then return to Malaysia to await his release.

== Cast ==
- Vince Vaughn as John "Sheriff" Volgecherev
- Anne Heche as Beth Eastern
- Joaquin Phoenix as Lewis McBride
- David Conrad as Tony Croft
- Vera Farmiga as Kerrie
- Nick Sandow as Ravitch
- Jada Pinkett Smith as M.J. Major
- Raymond J. Barry as Sheriff's Father
- Patrick Teoh as Chief Judge
- Deanna Yusoff as Woman in Bar

== Production ==
The film was directed by Joseph Ruben, and the screenplay was written by Wesley Strick and Bruce Robinson. Propaganda Films, Tetragram and PolyGram Filmed Entertainment produced the feature, which was distributed by the latter in the United States, Universal Pictures in Germany, Warner Bros. in France and 20th Century Fox in Argentina.

Anne Heche, Joaquin Phoenix and Vince Vaughn were cast in the three leading roles of Beth Eastern, Lewis McBride and John "Sheriff" Volgecherev, respectively. Vera Farmiga made her feature film debut with this film, in the supporting role of Kerrie. Jada Pinkett Smith was cast in the supporting role of M.J. Major, and David Conrad was cast in the supporting role of Tony Croft.

Principal photography began in November 1997, in locations including New York City, Philadelphia, Hong Kong, Phuket and Macau.

== Reception ==
=== Box office ===
Return to Paradise made $2,465,129 in its opening weekend in the United States (ranking 14th overall at the box office) for a per theater average of $2,554. The film's eventual domestic gross of $8,341,087 failed to recoup its $14 million budget.

=== Critical response ===
The film received mostly positive reviews from film critics. Rotten Tomatoes gave the film a 70% approval rating, based on 44 reviews, with an average rating of 6.6/10. On Metacritic it has a rating of 54 out of 100 based on reviews from 22 critics. Audiences polled by CinemaScore gave the film an average grade of "B" on an A+ to F scale.

Roger Ebert of the Chicago Sun-Times gave the film 3.5 out of 4, writing: "Return to Paradise has been compared to Midnight Express, another film about a thoughtless American facing the forfeit of his life in prison far from home. That was more of a visceral film. This one is more cerebral. Like Sheriff and Tony, we're pulled both ways by the story: We want them to go back and save Lewis, but we're not exactly sure we'd do the same. That's the prisoner's dilemma in a nutshell." Owen Gleiberman of Entertainment Weekly wrote: "Return to Paradise sounds as gimmicky as a Twilight Zone episode, but it's not. The film tracks the week in which Sheriff struggles to discover his conscience, and it puts us right in touch with his squirmy, divided soul."

Janet Maslin of The New York Times wrote: "As Sheriff, Mr. Vaughn projects a deep-seated skepticism and chilliness that give the story its suspense; he seems quite capable of keeping his distance and leaving Lewis to die. And Mr. Phoenix, though not often seen after the film's vivid Malaysian prologue, conveys the terrible pathos in Lewis's situation. But as Ms. Heche's formidable Beth Eastern does her best to manipulate the other characters on Lewis's behalf, Return to Paradise takes on the abstract weightiness of an ethical debate rather than the visceral urgency of a thriller. Though the clock ticks relentlessly enough to sustain the story's tension, the film finally seems to be a character study in search of a gripping plot." Kenneth Turan of the Los Angeles Times gave a negative review, writing: "If it's to be experienced at all, Return to Paradise is best seen as a lively piece of pulp, not a profound exploration of the vagaries of the human soul."

=== Accolades ===
Two of the actors were nominated for Hungary's Csapnivaló best performers awards in 2000.

Year	Award	Category	Recipient	Result
2000	Csapnivalo Awards	Best Actress in a Leading Role	Anne Heche	Nominated
2000	Csapnivalo Awards	Best Male Performance	Joaquin Phoenix	Nominated

== See also ==
- Brokedown Palace (1999)
- Capital punishment
