= Steffany Huckaby =

American actress

- Occupation: Actress
- Years active: 2004–present

Steffany Huckaby is an American actress.

== Career ==
She is best known for her role as Beth in the television series, Greek. She starred in the horror film, Death Tunnel and The Pleasure Drivers as Casey Ethot. She also received strong reviews for her theatrical performance as Kia in the play The Last Schwartz.

== Filmography ==
Film roles
Year	Title	Role	Notes
2004	Career Suicide	New Girl	Short film
2004	Scarecrow Gone Wild	Girl in Opening	
2004	Starkweather	Carol King	
2005	Death Tunnel	Heather	
2005	Guy in Row Five	Kate	
2006	Evil Within	Brandi Sheer	Short film
2006	Venus	Alice	Short film
2006	The Pleasure Drivers	Casey Ethot	
2009	Adam	Carol	
2010	My Name Is Khan	Kathy Baker	Uncredited
2010	Fairly Criminal	Becky / Barianna	Short film
2010	Disconnect	Haley Simmons	

Television roles
Year	Title	Role	Notes
2004	The O.C.	April	Episode: "The L.A."
2008	Skip Tracer	Young Sexy Nurse	Television film
2008–10	Greek	Beth	13 episodes
2010	Justified	Nurse	Episode: "The Lord of War and Thunder"
2010	Squatters	Secretary	Episodes: "A Fresh Pair", "Commuters"
2011	Sons of Anarchy	Woman with Baby	Episode: "Burnt and Purged Away"
