= Scarecrow Gone Wild =

Drama film by York Entertainment

- Directed by: Brian Katkin
- Written by: Brian Katkin
- Release date: 2004

Scarecrow Gone Wild is a low-budget direct-to-video film by York Entertainment released in 2004 about a group of college students who are hunted down by a killer scarecrow after a hazing ritual sends one male student into a coma.

The film is the third in a series of films about scarecrows who kill people. The first two are Scarecrow and Scarecrow Slayer, both by The Asylum, a different production company. The film was directed and written by Brian Katkin. Ken Shamrock, former NWA World Heavyweight Champion, appears in the film as the coach. Despite portraying a secondary role, Shamrock received top billing. It is notable for being the film debut of Olivia Munn, who appears in a small role.

== Plot ==
Sam (Caleb Roehrig) is one of the freshman on the baseball team who are being hazed by upperclassmen, including his friend Jack (Matthew Linhardt). Because Sam needs a scholarship to attend college, Jack gave him a blood sample so that no one would know he was diabetic and he would make the team, thus giving him a chance at a scholarship.

Although Jack promises his coach that there will be no hazing, the rest of the team (and some young women) go to the haunted corn field and continue the hazing. The hazing ritual comes to a bitter end in a haunted cornfield when the baseball players mistake one of Sam's diabetic attacks with Sam trying to start a fight. They tie him up to the scarecrow and leave him for dead. Sam becomes the evil Scarecrow who decides to seek bloody revenge on his tormentors and pretty much everyone else in the film. The only way for Jack and his friends to stop the scarecrow is by getting their friend out of his coma, a task which proves to be near impossible since the nearest hospital is conveniently under construction. After a series of attacks by the scarecrow the students finally figure out how to stop him and bring back their friend.

The movie skips to 3 weeks after the attacks, and show Jack and his new girlfriend (a survivor of the scarecrow's attack) getting ready to pick the coach up to take him to his red-eye flight, and Sam and baseball jock, Mike getting ready to attend a sorority party. Just as things are beginning to look up for our protagonists, Sam murders Mike and the coach. He then chases Jack and his girlfriend into a chapel where they battle for the final time. Suddenly the scarecrow (Sam) also has the power to shoot what looks like electrical currents out of his hands. Through their epic battle Jack somehow becomes the scarecrow and does the logical thing, impaling himself on a nearby cross.

== Cast ==
- Ken Shamrock as Coach Ramsey
- Matthew Linhardt as Jack
- Samantha Aisling as Beth
- Caleb Roehrig as Sam
- David Zelina as Mike
- Tara Platt as Lynn
- Kristina Sheldon as Patty
- Jeff Rector as Ray
- Travis Parker as Ed
- Lyndsay Douglas as Sara
- Sean Andrews as Phil
- Lisa Robert as Sandy
- Eric Forte as Jim
- Jeremy Davis as Dave
- Dennis Kinard as Joel
- Johnny Marks as Nick
- Steven Worley as the Scarecrow
- Olivia Munn as Girl #1
- Steffany Huckaby as Girl in Opening

== See also ==
- List of films featuring diabetes
- List of hazing deaths in the United States
