= The Pleasure Drivers =

2006 film directed by Andrzej Sekuła

- Directed by: Andrzej Sekuła
- Written by: Adam Haynes
- Produced by: Timothy Patrick Cavanaugh; Stephen F. Owens
- Starring: Lauren Holly; Angelo Spizzirri; Steffany Huckaby; Meat Loaf; Jill Bennett; Lacey Chabert; Angus Macfadyen
- Cinematography: Andrzej Sekuła; Zoran Djordjevic
- Music by: Steven Gutheinz
- Release date: June 28, 2006
- Running time: 99 minutes
- Country: United States
- Language: English

The Pleasure Drivers is a 2006 American thriller drama film. It was directed by Andrzej Sekuła and written by Adam Haynes. It stars Lauren Holly, Angelo Spizzirri, Steffany Huckaby, Meat Loaf, Jill Bennett, Lacey Chabert and Angus Macfadyen.

== Premise ==
The Pleasure Drivers lays out three separate interconnected stories involving a therapist, a call girl, a lesbian hit woman, a kidnapper, and a brain-damaged ex-cult guru.

== Release ==
The film, produced in 2005, was not subject to a theatrical release, but was instead released Direct-to-DVD. It was released in Iceland in 2006 and in the United States, the United Kingdom and the Netherlands in 2007.

== Cast ==
- Lauren Holly as Daphne Widesecker
- Angelo Spizzirri as Tom Ethot
- Steffany Huckaby as Casey Ethot
- Meat Loaf as Dale
- Angus Macfadyen as Bill Plummer
- Lacey Chabert as Faruza
- Jill Bennett as Marcy
- Deena Dill as Alexis Plummer
- Sascha Knopf as Amity
- Billy Zane as Marvin
- Frank O'Neill as The Manager of "The Big Cock Inn"
- Timothy Patrick Cavanaugh as Dick
