= Scott Sowers =

American actor

Scott Nicolai Sowers (November 5, 1963 – April 1, 2018) was an American actor. He is best known for his roles as Detective Parker in the late 1990s ABC series Cracker and for his role as Stanley Kowalski on stage in A Streetcar Named Desire. He established the Signature Theatre Company in 1991, and the following year he won the Drama-Logue Award for Performance for his role as the colonel in A Few Good Men at the Shubert Theatre.

In films, he has played some notable minor roles, such as a mercenary in Under Siege 2: Dark Territory (1995), a prison guard in Dead Man Walking (1995), and a condemned man in True Grit (2010). Aside from numerous dramatic readings for audiobooks, Sowers provided his voice for videogames such as Batman: Dark Tomorrow (2003), Manhunt 2 (2007) and Homefront (2011).

== Early life ==
Sowers was born on November 5, 1963, in Arlington County, Virginia. There, he graduated from Washington-Lee High School in 1982 (along with friend Sandra Bullock). Sowers went on to study at the University of North Carolina School of the Arts before moving to New York City.

== Background and stage work ==
Sowers began his career as a stage actor. In 1989, New York Magazine praised his "excellent" performance as Starns in the play Heathen Valley. In 1991, he established the Signature Theater Company with James Houghton. In 1992, the Chicago Sun-Times noted Sowers' "formidable colonel" in a stage production of A Few Good Men at the Shubert Theatre. The production later went on a national tour, which won him the Drama-Logue Award for Performance.

In 1996, Sowers played Will Masters on stage in a Broadway production of Bus Stop. In 2004, he played Stanley Kowalski in A Streetcar Named Desire at Studio 54 in New York City; the following year, John C. Reilly played the part and Sowers played the more minor part of Steve. In 2007, he appeared on Broadway in Inherit the Wind.

With the Ensemble Studio Theatre, Sowers appeared in productions of Matthew and the Pastor’s Wife, Lenin’s Embalmers, Princes of Waco, Lucy and Hand to God. He has also appeared on stage in the Wilma Theater of Philadelphia, the Long Wharf Theater of New Haven, Connecticut in 2003, the Actor's Theater of Louisville, the Baltimore Center Stage, and the Oslo Festival in Norway. In September 2012, he appeared at the Valborg Theatre of Appalachian State University in Romulus Linney ... Back Home in the Mountains: A Tribute to Romulus Linney.

== Film and television roles ==
Sowers starred in the 1995 Steven Seagal film Under Siege 2: Dark Territory as one of the mercenaries, and has played detectives and police officers in various films and television series, including Cracker, where he played Detective Parker from 1997 to 1999, and a prison guard in the 1995 film Dead Man Walking. He appeared in A Season for Miracles (1999), and several episodes of Law & Order and its spinoffs, Law & Order: Special Victims Unit and Law & Order: Criminal Intent. He also made an appearance in Erin Brockovich in 2000.

In 2009, he portrayed Uncle Drake in the TV series Get Hit. This was followed by a role as Joseph Earl Dinler in the Boardwalk Empire episode "Anastasia" in 2010. In 2010 he also played an unrepentant condemned man in the acclaimed Coen Brothers film True Grit opposite Jeff Bridges. In 2013 he had a minor role as Russo in an episode of the CBS series Blue Bloods.

== Other work ==
Sowers has done dramatic readings for audiobooks, notably many of Hunter S. Thompson's works, and provided voice characterization for the short documentary film An American Synagogue. California Bookwatch praised Sowers' "dramatic prowess which translates well to audio as he tells of a police chief forced into identifying a dead woman". In 2003 he provided the voice of Scarface's men for the video game Batman: Dark Tomorrow, and in 2011 he provided the voice of Arnie in the videogame Homefront.

== Death ==
On April 1, 2018, Sowers died of a heart attack at the age of 54, at a friend's home in New York City.

== Filmography ==
Year	Title	Role	Notes
1995	Under Siege 2: Dark Territory	Mercenary #3	
1995	Money Train	Mr. Brown	
1995	Dead Man Walking	Guard #2	
1996	Ripe	Colonel Wyman	
1997	Commandments	Detective Malhoney	
1998	Boogie Boy	"Bulldog"	
1999	Cradle Will Rock	Reporter #2	
1999	Blue Streak	Prison Guard #37	
2000	Erin Brockovich	Mike Ambrosino	
2004	The Village	Man with the Raised Eyebrows	
2005	Trust the Man	TerminEx Guy	
2006	508 Nelson	Lee Bartow	
2006	Diggers	South Shell Guy #2	
2007	The Ten	Barry Noodle, Jury Foreman	
2010	True Grit	Unrepentant Condemned Man	
2010	Boardwalk Empire	Joseph Earl Dinler/The Grand Cyclops	Episode: "Anastasia"
2014	23 Blast	Mr. Marshall	Final film role
