= Annie Burgstede =

American actress

- Born: Anna Louise Burgstede; September 18, 1983 (age 42); Waupaca, Wisconsin
- Occupations: Film, television actress film and television writer

Annie Burgstede (born Anna Louise Burgstede on September 18, 1983, in Waupaca, Wisconsin) is an American actress.

Annie initially began her run on Days of Our Lives in October 2006 in a recurring capacity, but after only a few episodes was upgraded to contract status. Initially known only as Willow, the character's last name was revealed to be Stark in January 2007. Burgstede left Days of Our Lives on June 5, 2007.

== Filmography ==
=== Film ===
Year	Title	Role	Notes
2005	Sleeping Dogs Lie	Priscilla (voice)	Short
2005	Duck	Nanny	
2005	Death Tunnel	Tori	
2008	Foxglove	Virginia West	Short
2009	Follow the Prophet	Avery Coldon	
2009	Plus One	Elisabeth Taylor	Short
2011	The Anniversary at Shallow Creek	Katie	
2012	Behind the Scenes at American Apparel	Anna	Video short
2012	Plain Jane Escorts	Suzie	Short
2012	Shit People Say... While Parking	Annie	Video short
2013	Somebody Marry Me	Stacy	
2015	He's the Best	Clare	Short

=== Television ===
Year	Title	Role	Notes
2005	Cold Case	Wendy (1976)	Episode: "Yo, Adrian"
2005	Everwood	Pippi	Episodes: "Complex Guilt", "Acceptance"
2005	All of Us	Girl #1	Episode: "Hollywood Swinging"
2005	Charmed	Alicia	Episode: "Malice in Wonderland"
2006	Smallville	Samantha Drake	Episode: "Fanatic"
2006, 2009	CSI: Crime Scene Investigation	Zoe Kessler, Diane Jasper	Episodes: "Pirates of the Third Reich", "The Lost Girls"
2006–07	Days of Our Lives	Willow Stark	Guest role
2009	Without a Trace	Cailyn Samson	Episode: "Labyrinths"
2011	Criminal Minds: Suspect Behavior	Tami Vinoda	Episode: "Devotion"
2012	Rizzoli & Isles	Laura Stevens	Episode: "Over/Under"
2015	Straight Out of the Closet	Samantha	TV film

== Other work ==
Year	Title	Project	Notes
2012	Behind the Scenes of American Apparel	Video short	Co-writer, co-producer, director
2012	Plain Jane Escorts	Short	Writer, producer, director, cinematographer, editor
2012	Casual Coffee	Short	Writer, producer, director, cinematographer
2013	Straight Out of the Closet	TV film	Producer
2015	He's the Best	Short	Writer, producer
2017	Orange Lipstick	Short	Co-producer
2018	Project Mc2	TV series (7 episodes)	Executive story editor
2018	Better Start Running	Feature	Producer
2018-19	The Young and the Restless	TV series (132 episodes)	Associate head writer
