= Follow the Prophet =

- DVD cover
- Directed by: Drew Ann Rosenberg
- Screenplay by: Robert Chimento
- Produced by: Joan Sweeny; Paul Bernard; James Scura
- Starring: Robert Chimento; Tom Noonan; Diane Venora; David Conrad; Annie Burgstede; R. D. Call; John Diehl
- Cinematography: Walt Lloyd
- Edited by: Dennis O'Connor
- Music by: Jussi Tegelman
- Production company: Red Road Productions
- Distributed by: Warner Bros. Digital Distribution
- Release dates: January 23, 2009 (Santa Barbara Film Festival); April 30, 2010 (United States)
- Running time: 91 minutes
- Country: United States
- Language: English
- Budget: $2 million

Follow the Prophet is an American film that was written by and stars Robert Chimento, which was created to show how polygamist lifestyles affect the children involved. In the film, a young girl escaping from a polygamist cult is aided by an U.S. Army colonel and a renegade sheriff who join forces to save an even younger girl from a secret "marriage" to the cult's leader.

== Plot ==
On her 15th birthday Avery Colden (Annie Burgstede) discovers from her father (David Conrad) that she is to be given as a secret bride to the new prophet (Tom Noonan) of a religious cult. She escapes with the help of army Colonel Jude Marks (Robert Chimento) and a renegade sheriff (Diane Venora). When they find out that her younger sister is chosen to take her place as the secret bride they join forces to expose the truth that lies hidden in a town in Utah. Marks calls in favors from the military and Washington but even that may not be enough to help them fight the deeply secretive cult.

== Production ==
Filming took place in Portland, Oregon.

== Release ==
The film premiered in competition at the 2009 Santa Barbara International Film Festival and was also screened at the Newport Beach Film Festival. Follow the Prophet opened theatrically on April 30, 2010 at a benefit for the Texas Center For The Missing, Coordinator of the Houston Regional Amber Alert. It was released for pay-per-view on May 1, 2010 and on DVD on May 14.

== Reception ==
Variety magazine describes Follow the Prophet as generally an "above-average" made-for-cable film.

== Recognition ==
- Palm Beach International Film Festival, 2010. Official selection.
- WorldFest-Houston International Film Festival, 2010. Remi Award.
