= Vice (2008 film) =

- Directed by: Raul Inglis
- Written by: Raul Inglis
- Produced by: Matthew Robert Kelly; Daryl Hannah; Michael Madsen
- Starring: Michael Madsen; Daryl Hannah; Mykelti Williamson; Mark Boone Junior
- Cinematography: Andrzej Sekuła
- Edited by: Kelly Herron
- Music by: Cliff Martinez
- Production companies: Arcview Entertainment; 41 Inc.
- Distributed by: Multicom Entertainment Group
- Release date: May 2008
- Running time: 99 minutes
- Country: United States
- Language: English

Vice is a 2008 crime-drama film directed and written by Raul Inglis, and starring Michael Madsen and Daryl Hannah.

The film is dedicated to actor Chris Penn.

== Premise ==
An undercover drug deal goes wrong and Max sees the other cops involved start dropping. While trying to investigate the murders, he deals with his own personal demons.

== Cast ==
- Michael Madsen as Max Walker
- Daryl Hannah as Salt
- Mykelti Williamson as Sampson
- Mark Boone Junior as Bugsby
- Kurupt as T.J. Greene
- John Cassini as Travalino
- Chelah Horsdal as Woman In Elevator
- Justine Warrington as Hooker

== Production ==
Filming took place in Los Angeles, California, as well as Vancouver, British Columbia on a budget of just over $4 million. It was released in May 2008.

== Critical reception ==
The New York Times said in its review, "Michael Madsen, best known as the sadistic Mr. Blonde in “Reservoir Dogs,” has appeared in his share of B movies, and “Vice” won’t catapult him to the A list. But the film, a muddled, disposable crime thriller, has modest merits.

Robert Koehler of Variety said in his review; "Vice has the potential to be a vastly more interesting moral drama than it becomes (...) However, these sins are comparatively mild compared to those in Bad Lieutenant or The French Connection."

Rotten Tomatoes rates Vice at 29%.
