= Andrzej Sekuła =

Polish cinematographer and film director (born 1954)

- Born: 19 December 1954 (age 71); Wrocław, Poland
- Occupations: Cinematographer, director
- Years active: 1986–present

Andrzej Sekuła (Polish: [ˈandʐɛj sɛˈkuwa]; born 19 December 1954) is a Polish cinematographer and film director.

== Career ==
He began as a still photographer for a Polish film studio, and served his compulsory conscription in the Polish army as a film cameraman, shooting army exercises that were organized for people like Soviet president Leonid Brezhnev and Romanian president Nicolae Ceausescu. He described the shots as good training and like that out of Apocalypse Now. He worked for a while as a television documentary cameraman.

Sekuła became interested in cinematography after seeing the work of Oswald Morris in Moulin Rouge and Fiddler on the Roof. He decided to move to England to study at the National Film School under the tutelage of Morris from 1985 to 1988. After that he shot commercials around Europe.

Yearning for Hollywood, Sekuła emigrated to Los Angeles in the late 1980s. After working on several short films, he shot his first feature-length film, Reservoir Dogs, made by Quentin Tarantino in his directorial debut before reteaming with Tarantino for his Best Picture-nominated film Pulp Fiction. Mary Harron admired his work with Tarantino and wanted a similar hyper-realistic look for American Psycho.

Sekuła made his directorial debut with the 1998 thriller Fait Accompli. He then directed Cube 2: Hypercube and The Pleasure Drivers.

== Filmography ==
Feature film

Year	Title	Director	Notes
1992	Reservoir Dogs	Quentin Tarantino	
1993	Three of Hearts	Yurek Bogayevicz	
1993	Bank Robber	Nick Mead	
1993	Damascus	Becky Johnston	
1994	Sleep with Me	Rory Kelly	
1994	Across the Moon	Lisa Gottlieb	
1994	Pulp Fiction	Quentin Tarantino	
1994	Oleanna	David Mamet	
1995	Hackers	Iain Softley	
1997	A Further Gesture	Robert Dornhelm	With Zoran Djordjevic
1997	Stand-ins	Harvey Keith	
1998	Cousin Bette	Des McAnuff	
1998	Fait Accompli	Himself	
2000	American Psycho	Mary Harron	
2002	Cube 2: Hypercube	Himself	
2006	The Pleasure Drivers	Himself	With Zoran Djordjevic
2007	Vacancy	Nimród Antal	
2008	Vice	Raul Inglis	
2009	Armored	Nimród Antal	
2010	Trust	David Schwimmer	
2012	For the Love of Money	Ellie Kanner	
2014	Rage	Paco Cabezas	
2016	I Am Wrath	Chuck Russell	
2016	Lord of Shanghai	Sherwood Hu	
2016	USS Indianapolis: Men of Courage	Mario Van Peebles	
2018	Speed Kills	Jodi Scurfield	
2020	Lord of Shanghai II	Sherwood Hu	
2022	What the Fish!	Alyse McCamish	
2023	The Ritual Killer	George Gallo	
2023	Place of Bones	Audrey Cummings	
2026	Breaking Cover	Adrian Bol	

== Awards and nominations ==
Year	Award	Category	Title	Result
1994	BAFTA Awards	Best Cinematography	Pulp Fiction	Nominated
2000	Camerimage	Golden Frog	American Psycho	Nominated
2003	Fantasporto	Critic's Award	Cube 2: Hypercube	Won
2003	Fantasporto	Best Film Award	Cube 2: Hypercube	Nominated
