= Miss Match =

American comedy-drama television series

- Genre: Comedy drama; Romantic comedy
- Created by: Darren Star; Jeff Rake
- Starring: Alicia Silverstone; Lake Bell; David Conrad; Jodi Long; James Roday Rodriguez; Ryan O'Neal
- Theme music composer: Macy Gray; Mike Elizondo
- Opening theme: "Love Is Gonna Get You" by Macy Gray
- Composers: David Kitay; David Lawrence; William Levine
- Country of origin: United States
- Original language: English
- No. of seasons: 1
- No. of episodes: 17 (6 unaired)

Production
- Executive producers: Darren Star; Jeff Rake; Brian Grazer; David Nevins
- Producers: Samantha Daniels; Alicia Silverstone
- Running time: 40–44 minutes
- Production companies: Imagine Television; Darren Star Productions; 20th Century Fox Television

Original release
- Network: NBC
- Release: September 26 – December 15, 2003

Miss Match is an American comedy-drama television series created by Jeff Rake and Darren Star and produced by Imagine Television, Darren Star Productions, and 20th Century Fox Television. It aired in the United States on NBC from September 26 to December 15, 2003. Seventeen episodes of the series were filmed, with eleven aired in the United States.

Starring Alicia Silverstone and Ryan O'Neal, the show garnered poor ratings, which could have been due to its inability to compete in the Friday 8 pm ET timeslot (the "Friday night death slot"). It was based on the real-life story of Samantha Daniels.

== Premise ==
A Los Angeles matrimonial attorney, Kate Fox (Alicia Silverstone), doubles as a high-end matchmaker even though her own love life is far from perfect.

== Cast and characters ==
=== Main ===
The cast of Miss Match; from left to right: Lake Bell, Ryan O'Neal, Jodi Long, Alicia Silverstone, James Roday Rodriguez, David Conrad, and JoBeth Williams

- Alicia Silverstone as Kate Fox: A divorce lawyer by day who ends up becoming a match maker. Her own romantic life is complicated. Throughout the series she is involved with Michael and later his best friend, Adam. Kate often finds herself getting involved in the relationships she sets up for people. Various characters mention to her that she is addicted to love and lives through the lives of others.
- Lake Bell as Victoria Carlson: Kate's best friend who is a bartender. She often oversees the dates Kate sets people up with. She tends to only have flings with men, like the one she starts with Nick. The only man we see her like as more than a hookup is Adam.
- David Conrad as Michael Mendelson: Kate's on and off again boyfriend after she sets him up on several dates. His ex-girlfriend is Lauren who left him for his best friend Adam.
- Jodi Long as Claire: A secretary at Fox & Associates.
- James Roday Rodriguez as Nick Paine: Kate's co-worker who is a womanizer. He and Kate tolerate each other, at best. He later dates Victoria.
- Ryan O'Neal as Jerry Fox: Kate's father who owned the law firm she works for. He was not a perfect father to Kate but they bonded over law. He is shown to still have feelings for Kate's mother but is not hung up on her. Later in the series he is linked with Serena.

=== Recurring ===
- Charisma Carpenter as Serena Lockner: An old classmate of Kate who comes back into her life. Kate helps her adopt a baby and give it back to the mother when she realizes she made a mistake. She later returns and starts a romance with Kate's father.
- Dina Meyer as Lauren Logan: Michael's ex-girlfriend and Adam's ex-wife. After finding out that Michael and Kate are involved, she makes Kate break it off. After finding out Adam and Kate are involved, she sues Kate's law firm for malpractice.
- Nathan Fillion as Adam Logan: Adam comes to town after Lauren hires Kate as her divorce lawyer. He and Michael end up repairing their friendship but he soon becomes involved with Kate and Victoria.

NBC had a cross promotion where Deanna Wright, Galen Gering and McKenzie Westmore, who starred on NBC's soap opera Passions, appeared in an episode of the series.

== Episodes ==
| No. | Title | Directed by | Original release date | Prod. code | U.S. viewers (millions) |
|---|---|---|---|---|---|
| 1 | "Pilot" | Darren Star | September 26, 2003 | 1AHE79 | 7.7 |
| 2 | "Who's Your Daddy?" | Steven Miner | October 3, 2003 | 1AHE01 | 5.9 |
| 3 | "Something Nervy" | Allison Liddi-Brown | October 10, 2003 | 1AHE02 | 6.0 |
| 4 | "Kate in Ex-Tasy" | Randy Zisk | October 17, 2003 | 1AHE03 | 6.5 |
| 5 | "I Got You, Babe" | Tom Moore | October 24, 2003 | 1AHE05 | 6.7 |
| 6 | "Addicted to Love" | Michael Lange | November 7, 2003 | 1AHE06 | 5.9 |
| 7 | "Jive Turkey" | Dennis Erdman | November 14, 2003 | 1AHE08 | 5.7 |
| 8 | "The Love Bandit" | Arvin Brown | November 21, 2003 | 1AHE07 | 5.7 |
| 9 | "Bad Judgement" | Tim Busfield | December 5, 2003 | 1AHE09 | 6.8 |
| 10 | "Santa, Baby" | Arlene Sanford | December 12, 2003 | 1AHE10 | 5.9 |
| 11 | "Who's Sari Now?" | Jamie Babbit | December 15, 2003 | 1AHE11 | 6.1 |
| 12 | "The Price of Love" | TBD | Unaired | 1AHE04 | TBD |
| 13 | "Miss Communication" | TBD | Unaired | 1AHE12 | TBD |
| 14 | "Divorce Happens" | TBD | Unaired | 1AHE13 | TBD |
| 15 | "Forgive and Forget" | TBD | Unaired | 1AHE14 | TBD |
| 16 | "Most Hopeless Romantics" | TBD | Unaired | 1AHE15 | TBD |
| 17 | "Matchmaker, Matchmaker" | TBD | Unaired | 1AHE16 | TBD |

== Production ==
The series was executive produced by Darren Star, who also directed the pilot, and Jeff Rake, who wrote the pilot, as well as David Nevins and Brian Grazer. After Alicia Silverstone, the first actors cast in Miss Match were David Conrad, Lake Bell and James Roday Rodriguez in February 2003. This was followed by the casting of Ryan O'Neal, as the divorce attorney father of Silverstone's character, and Jodi Long, in early March 2003.

NBC ordered Miss Match (then titled Miss/Match) to series in May 2003. In December 2003 NBC added four episodes to the order for Miss Match, bringing the total number of produced episodes to 17.

== Reception ==
Based on 12 reviews, the show holds an 83% approval rating on review aggregator Rotten Tomatoes. The critics consensus reads, "With the incredibly charming Alicia Silverstone at the helm, Miss Match is a sweet romantic comedy with echoes of Sex and the City."
