= List of Greek (TV series) characters =

The following is a list of characters from the American comedy-drama television series Greek.

== Main characters ==
Casey Cartwright	Spencer Grammer	Year: Alumna	Major: English	Position(s) Held: Pledge Educator (former), Rush Chair (former), Delegate to Pan-Hellenic (retired), Interim President (former), Vice President: Judicial of Panhellenic Council (former), House mother (former)
Casey is the female protagonist as well as Rusty's popular and enterprising older sister. Introduced as a big-time power player at ZBZ with presidential aspirations, Casey was troubled at the presence of her nerdy brother Rusty. Over time, the siblings become closer with Casey guiding Rusty through the inner workings of the Greek world. Casey grows more selfless and courageous, often sticking her neck out for the sorority or for one of her sisters in need. Her tenure as president motivates her to focus more on her future. She decides to enter the world of politics and upon graduation; Casey is set to start law school. However, she was ready to put off her goals for Cappie, her first love and the focus of many love triangles throughout the series. Though she desires to be with Cappie, Casey chooses her future and loses Cappie in the process. At the end of the series, she reunites with Cappie with whom she leaves law school and moves to Washington, D.C.
Russell "Rusty" Cartwright "Spitter"	Jacob Zachar	Year: Junior	Major: Polymer Science	Position(s) Held: President, "Revenge Chair" (former), Pledge Educator (former), Rush Chair (former)
Rusty is the male protagonist as well as Casey's socially awkward and younger brother. As a stereotypical nerd, Rusty began his freshman year looking to shed his image and have fun. He finds himself among the rowdy brothers of the Kappa Tau fraternity with the nickname of “Spitter.” Rusty is given a crash course on partying by big brother Cappie and over time, he loses some of his naiveté. However, he still retains his optimistic and honest personality, which is refreshing to his friends and to Casey who begins to see Rusty in a different light. When he becomes an active, Rusty is quick to earn Cappie's trust and take on some responsibility. He assumes the position of Pledge Educator and was the mastermind behind Kappa Tau's revenge plot against Omega Chi. Though he started off as a dateless virgin, Rusty has been part of a few love triangles. His duties at Kappa Tau and active social life have caused problems for Rusty academically but he manages to balance the two together, even winning a lucrative grant. He begins a new relationship with Ashleigh and takes Cappie's place as KT President in the series finale.
Evan Chambers	Jake McDorman	Year: 1st Year Law School	Major: Pre-Law	Position(s) Held: President (former), Pledge Educator (former), Delegate to IFC (former)
As a charismatic overachiever, Evan was often the center of attention as he was born into a wealthy and prominent family. He strives to please those around him but feels manipulated because of his affluence. Evan declares his independence and relinquishes his trust fund leaving him struggling to make ends meet. Though Evan can be benevolent and noble at times, he has shown a much darker side. This is often towards his old childhood friend Cappie and his brothers at Kappa Tau, who call him "Bing" since freshmen year. A love triangle between Cappie, Evan and Casey was the catalyst for the rivalry between their respective houses. Though Evan and Cappie attempted an alliance, house loyalties proved too much for Evan to overcome. He however maintains a tentative friendship with his ex-girlfriend Casey and has a strong advocate in Calvin. He also finds a kindred spirit in Rebecca. However, during the fourth season Rebecca and he break up when she feels he is pulling away from her. With some help from Rusty, he begins to reconcile with his parents.
Captain John Paul "Cappie" Jones	Scott Michael Foster	Year: Alumnus	Major: Philosophy	Position(s) Held: President (former), Pledge Educator (former)
Originally uninterested in Greek life, Cappie rises to become the President of the unruly Kappa Tau. “Cappie” is actually a nickname and his real name is "Captain John Paul Jones," which was finally revealed during the last five minutes of the series finale. His carefree and fun-loving personality hides a very sharp mind. Despite that, Cappie has no actual goals and no intentions of leaving Kappa Tau, which he considers his home. The only time Cappie considered moving on is for his first love Casey. Casey and Cappie dated in their freshman year but Cappie's partying ways conflicted with the more ambitious Casey. Ultimately, Casey left him. Cappie never recovered from losing Casey and as a result he was unable to maintain any serious relationship afterwards. The two start to reconnect when Cappie takes Rusty on as his little brother. Along the way, Casey and Cappie reconcile but history repeats itself and they split up once again. Cappie and Casey later decide to give their relationship another try. Following Cappie's "accidental" graduation, he and Casey relocate to Washington, D. C.
Rebecca Logan	Dilshad Vadsaria	Year: Junior	Major: Psychology	Position(s) Held: President, Pledge Educator (former)
A sophisticated but rebellious sister, Rebecca was distinguished among her rush class as her father was a prominent Senator. In addition to sleeping with Evan during rush, Rebecca's aloof and cynical attitude did not endear her to big sister Casey and they quickly become rivals. When her father is publicly disgraced, Rebecca begins an out of control downward spiral and reveals a much hidden vulnerable and lonely personality. When she was on the brink of expulsion due to her wild antics, it was Casey who came to her aid which instills a newfound respect between the two. Rebecca begins to actively contribute to the sorority in an attempt to prove herself and find her own identity. She uses her political savvy to have Ashleigh elected president and was a mole for ZBZ. She becomes more compassionate, though still can be brash at times. Her actions convince Casey to leave the sorority in her hands. Rebecca and Evan develop a relationship due their similar privileged yet dysfunctional backgrounds. However, Rebecca's self destructive tendencies threatened to ruin their newfound romance. She breaks up with Evan during season four. In the episode Legacy, her potential reconciliation with Evan is hinted.
Ashleigh Howard	Amber Stevens	Year: Alumna	Major: Marketing	Position(s) Held: President (former), Social Chair (former)
Known for her outrageous fashion sense and ditzy personality, Ashleigh is Casey's best friend since their freshman year. She often played a supporting role in Casey's endeavors. Her kind nature endeared her to most but also made her a pushover. Ashleigh is thrust into the spotlight when she is unexpectedly elected president. Though she lacks Frannie's ambition or Casey's wit, Ashleigh strives to break away from the old traditions of ZBZ. In the process, she becomes more assertive to the surprise of many. With Casey's encouragement, Ashleigh leads ZBZ to reclaim their position as the top sorority on campus. Even though Ashleigh has been successful with the presidential seat, she has had difficulty in the dating world. A recurring theme for Ashleigh is her poor choices in men. Though she tried to keep positive, her last relationship has made her more doubtful. Despite that, Ashleigh is looking forward to graduation as she accepted an internship as a trend forecaster in New York. In the second episode of season four, Ashleigh returns to CRU, due to her not being able to cope with her internship and quitting, and moves back into the ZBZ house with Casey. She develops feelings for Rusty. She and Rusty begin a relationship in the episode Legacy. Although their relationship is only hinted at, Ashleigh's little sister is most likely Ivy, due to the fact that the two sisters exchanged gifts during the big-little gift exchange.
Calvin Owens	Paul James	Year: Junior	Major: Accounting	Position(s) Held: Omega Chi President (former)
Calvin is an athletic legacy who is also one of Rusty's closest friends. Calvin's ability to adapt to most situations led Rusty to shadow him during rush. However, this was a defense mechanism to hide the fact that Calvin is gay but desires to be accepted by those around him. Through his relationships, Calvin begins to feel more comfortable with his sexuality, especially after Ashleigh unwittingly makes it public knowledge. He identifies with Rusty as they both feel like outsiders. Though it has been difficult at times, Calvin and Rusty maintain their friendship even when their respective houses are at war. This often causes conflict with his big brother Evan with whom Calvin shares a mutual respect, as it was Evan who defended Calvin's sexuality to Omega Chi. He in turn keeps Evan's ego in check especially when it comes to Rusty. Calvin becomes the key in Rusty's revenge plan to sway votes for Calvin as President of Omega Chi. His term as president is short-lived, as when the Omega Chis learn about his involvement in Kappa Tau's spring break prank, they lose their trust in him. He resigns and is replaced by Trip as interim president. In the series finale he declares a major as well decides to go to India for a semester abroad with Heath, his on/off love interest throughout the series.
Dale Kettlewell	Clark Duke	Year: Junior	Major: Electrical Engineering	Position(s) Held: ZBZ hasher, Omega Chi pledge, University Students Against Greeks founder (disbanded)
Dale is Rusty's conservative, competitive, and religious zealot roommate, who is also in the same Honors Engineering program. Initially, Dale despised the Greek system, even forming an organization to protest their very existence at Cyprus-Rhodes. He tried to self-righteously steer Rusty away from Kappa Tau but usually found himself mixed up in Rusty's predicaments. Through Rusty, Dale begins to interact with different Greeks. He quickly befriends Calvin despite his homophobic beliefs. He forms a close bond to the rowdy Cappie based somewhat in their mutual feelings for Casey. Dale even takes a job as Zeta Beta's hasher, in the process becoming a den mother of sorts to the sisters. His conservative views begin to change and Dale starts to come out of his shell, even losing his virginity to the much older property manager of the apartment he shares with Rusty. Though he is true to his faith, Dale becomes inspired by Rusty that there is more to college than just studies. In the fourth season, he becomes an Omega Chi pledge.
Frannie Morgan	Tiffany Dupont	Year: Alumna	Major: Pre-Med	Position(s) Held: ZBZ & IKI President (former), Pledge Educator (former)
As an ambitious, former, and active sister, Frannie strives to be the best in everything and rose to become the President of the most popular house on campus. Her biggest admirer was her little sister Casey, even though Frannie put her goals ahead of their friendship. Her obsession of keeping ZBZ's top spot led to her eventual downfall as Frannie was stripped of her title due to fallout from Jen K's exposé on the Greek system. Though she was resentful at first, she supported Casey as the new president. However, it did not stop her from trying to regain power. Her many machinations involving Casey, Ashleigh and Rebecca proved unsuccessful, so Frannie conspires with Evan to start a new sorority Iota Kappa Iota. Though IKI proved to be a formidable threat; the sorority was bust. Frannie disbands IKI and leaves the Greek system for good. She returns in the penultimate episode of season four to assist Rebecca.

== Supporting characters ==
These characters have been featured in more than 20 episodes of Greek.

KAPPA TAU GAMMA
Wade Matthews	Derek Mio	Chapter 1 - Chapter 5
Kappa Tau's former pledge educator and rush chair who was expelled because of an Omega Chi prank. He was also known for his scare tactics during rush. His nickname “Wade” is because he is not able to swim. His real name is revealed to be Wade.
Walter "Beaver" Boudreaux	Aaron Hill	Chapter 1 - Chapter 6
An unintelligent jock whose nickname came from him chewing on a wooden table during a drunken stupor. He was the top football recruit in his freshman year. He had a crush on Rebecca whom he later had a one-night stand with. He eventually enters a relationship with Katherine. His real name is Walter Boudreaux. Through the fourth season it is revealed that he's more intelligent than what it looks like at first and is an education major studying to be a kindergarten teacher.
Heath Anderson	Zack Lively	Chapter 1 - Chapter 6
A pre-med student who had a short-lived relationship with Calvin, later rekindled after Calvin and Grant split. He planned on graduating early but failed his final exams due to depression over the expulsion of his brothers. He gets back together with Calvin in the fourth season.
Ben Bennett	Daniel Weaver	Chapter 1 - Chapter 4
Rusty's pledge class President. His nickname is his name. He was initially jealous of Rusty's accomplishments. It was noted that he has not been seen by any of his brothers since homecoming of sophomore year.
Jeremy	Kristopher Hatfield	Chapter 2 - Chapter 5
A brother who had many peculiar habits, including watching people sleep and living in the dumpster of the Kappa Tau house. He was expelled as the result of an Omega Chi prank. He rarely spoke but was revealed to have a British accent.
Pickle	Adam Crosby	Chapter 2 -
A brother who was in Rusty's pledge class. He has an obsession with volcanoes and was inconsolable after the loss of Vesuvius.
Peter Parkes	Devon Werkheiser	Chapter 6
A KT legacy whose father is Lasker Parkes, creator of the 'Joshua Whopper' software. He becomes KT's sole pledge after they lose all of their pledges for violating the "dry rush" policy. The brothers nickname him Spider-Man.

OMEGA CHI DELTA
Grant	Gregory Michael	Chapter 4 -
A closeted gay brother who becomes Calvin's roommate and later boyfriend. When he comes out, he becomes overly sensitive to what others say. Grant becomes more flamboyant which bothered Calvin. They break up when Grant prefers to explore his sexuality rather than spend time with Calvin.

ZETA BETA ZETA
Laura	Aynsley Bubbico	Chapter 2 - Chapter 6
A stuffy sister with a short temper. She was formally ZBZ's liaison to Pan-Hellenic and scholarship chair. She and Ashleigh do not get along for unknown reasons. She had a secret relationship with Dale.
Betsy	Eileen Boylan	Chapter 2 -
ZBZ's social chair and a recovering alcoholic. Her boyfriend is also in recovery.

== Recurring characters ==
These characters have appeared in less than 20 episodes of Greek. Some of the characters had prominent roles during certain chapters.

ZETA BETA ZETA
Jordan Reed	Johanna Braddy	Chapter 4 - Chapter 5
A tomboyish transfer student who started out dating Rusty's little brother Andy before going on to date Rusty. She was Casey's little sister as a pledge at ZBZ. She left Cyprus-Rhodes to pursue a career in photography.
Beth	Steffany Huckaby	Chapter 3 - Chapter 6
A sweet but air headed Dance major who still hangs around the ZBZ house despite no longer being a part of the sorority. She defected ZBZ to join Frannie's IKI.
Jennifer Kenney	Jessica Rose	Chapter 1 - Chapter 1, 3 & 6
A clumsy undercover reporter who infiltrated ZBZ as a legacy pledge to write an article about the Greek system. She was Rusty's first girlfriend and became close to Casey during her time at ZBZ. Her article causes massive changes in the Greek system and her relationship with Rusty ended as a result. In the series finale she announces that she has come to regret the article.
Brenda	Marisa Lauren	Chapter 2 - Chapter 4
A sister in Rebecca's pledge class who was a part of clique led by Rebecca to make Casey miserable. She defects to Frannie's IKI but later pleads with Casey to take her back. Casey declines.
Abby	Olesya Rulin	Chapter 5 - Chapter 6
She is the current pledge class President who has an annoying habit of raising her hand whenever she wants to speak.
Mandi	Jessica Lowndes	Chapter 2 - Chapter 3
A sister in Rebecca's pledge class who was a part of clique led by Rebecca to make Casey miserable.
Ivy	Betsy Spina	Chapter 2 - Chapter 3
Ashleigh's little sister, who Casey nominated for "Standards Chair" because of her "strong moral center."
Lizzi	Senta Moses	Chapter 2 & Chapter 3
A perky Nationals consultant who was sent by Tegan to straighten up ZBZ after the article. Her strict rules caused a few of the sisters to deactivate and the rest were miserable. She worships her boss Tegan but the feeling is not mutual.
Robin Wylie	Anna Osceola	Chapter 2 & Chapter 4
A lesbian ZBZ alumni and Ashleigh's big sister. Rebecca develops a crush on her leading Rebecca to believe that she was a lesbian.
Tegan Walker	Charisma Carpenter	Chapter 1 - Chapter 3 & Chapter 7
A demanding ZBZ Nationals representative and member of the Grand Council. She took a liking to Casey and appointed her to replace Frannie as president after the scandal. Her opinion of Casey sours when Casey defies her position of having Rebecca expelled from ZBZ. She is demeaning to Lizzi until she stands up to her.
Libby	Jhoanna Flores	Chapter 1 & Chapter 2
Former ZBZ Philanthropy chair. She left the sorority under disgraceful circumstances.
Suzanne	Maggie Contreras	Chapter 3
She was the former ZBZ Standards Chair who handled any disciplinary problems in the sorority. She defects to Frannie's IKI.
Heather	Caitlin Thompson	Chapter 6
She is Heath's little sister and a freshman at CRU. She rushes ZBZ and gets in. Rebecca is her Big Sis. Rebecca keeps referring her as her favorite pledge. She also occasionally help's Rebecca out with her typical shenanigans!

KAPPA TAU GAMMA
Andy	Jesse McCartney	Chapter 4
Rusty's former little brother and star football player. He was also a high school friend of Calvin's. Rusty proposes to give him the nickname "Andylicious," but agrees to consider "something cooler." However, the nickname sticks and he is often referred to as Andylicious by the Kappa Tau brothers. Andy and Rusty's friendship falls apart when Rusty kisses Andy's girlfriend Jordan. Andy depledges Kappa Tau to focus on football.
Gonzo	Dave Franco	Chapter 2 - Chapter 4
A brother in Rusty's pledge class who got his nickname after watching “The Muppets Take Manhattan”. His real name is Brad. After he had not been seen in a while, Cappie remarked that he thought he saw Gonzo on Scrubs, referring to actor Dave Franco taking a starring role in the final season of Scrubs.
Anthony Hopkins	Devin Crittenden	Chapter 4 -
A pledge who got his nickname because his name is the same as actor Anthony Hopkins
Egyptian Joe	Geoffrey Arend	Chapter 2
Joe was Cappie's slacker big brother and the former Kappa Tau president. He created the infamous Vesuvius volcano which made him legendary.
Arrowhead	Paul T. Moore	Chapter 2 - Chapter 3
A brother in Rusty's pledge class. He is very paranoid and skilled in martial arts.
Woodchuck	Kendrick Sampson	Chapter 2 - Chapter 3
A brother in Rusty's pledge class. His real name is Jake and he got his nickname from making coasters.

OMEGA CHI DELTA
Trip	Kinsey McLean	Chapter 2 -
A brother who was in Calvin's pledge class. He resents Evan for his poor treatment of him during Hell Week. He was a nominee for president along with Calvin and was briefly president after the Omega Chi brothers forced Calvin to resign.
JP	Marshall Porter	Chapter 5 -
A brother at Omega Chi who are among those who are beginning to question Evan's authority.
Dino	Krishna Cole	Chapter 2 - Chapter 3
The former president of Omega Chi but most of his responsibilities are handled by Evan.
O’Toole	Joe Capece	Chapter 1 - Chapter 2 & 4
A brother who is mentioned more in name than in person.
Pete	Yani Gellman	Chapter 6
A baseball player whom Ashleigh briefly dated. His ex-girlfriend Natalie used him to annoy Ashleigh.
Trent	Bobby Campo	Chapter 2
A homophobic brother whose beliefs led him to deactivate.

OTHER GREEKS
Katherine Parker	Nora Kirkpatrick	Chapter 5 - Chapter 6
The stern President of Pan-Hellenic and a sister at Gamma Psi. Despite the rivalry between ZBZ and Gamma Psi, Katherine remains impartial in her duties. She initially clashes with Casey but she sees a lot of potential in her. Katherine and Rusty hit it off so well that Katherine wanted Rusty to take her virginity. Ultimately, Rusty declines her offer. Later she joins Casey and Evan at CRU Law, and hooks up with Beaver.
Natalie	Kristy Vaughan	Chapter 4 -
President of Gamma Psi Alpha. Though she appears to be a shy and soft-spoken sister, Natalie is actually very manipulative and deceitful. She resorted to underhanded tricks to ensure that Gamma Psi would remain the #1 sorority on campus.
Janette	Kelly Stables	Chapter 2 - Chapter 5
The former vice-president of Judicial for Pan-Hellenic and a sister at Gamma Psi. She left to focus on her studies. Janette led the pack of Gamma Psis in taunting Rebecca during Greek week which result in Rebecca assaulting her.
Jason	Brian Maillard	Chapter 2, 3 & 5
The arrogant social chair of the Psi Phi Pi whom Ashleigh dated only because he reminded her of her ex-boyfriend Travis.
Steve	Justin Grant Wade	Chapter 2 & 4
The vice-president of Judicial for the IFC and a brother at Lambda Sig. He often wears a red baseball cap.
Shane	Michael Copon	Chapter 2
A Lambda Sig brother whom Evan bribed not to date Casey.

NON GREEKS
Max Tyler	Michael Rady	Chapter 3 - Chapter 4
The former resident advisor of Rusty and Dale's dormitory floor. He was an older version of Rusty in terms of personality. He dated Casey which earned him the disdain of Cappie and Dale. Max was a mentor to Rusty as they shared the same major. He continued his education in Cyprus to stay closer to Casey. After they break up, a heartbroken Max moves to Europe.
Fisher	Andrew J. West	Chapter 4 - Chapter 6
A former ZBZ hasher who dated Ashleigh. He was a member of the school's pep squad. He shares a kiss with Rebecca but Ashleigh forgave him. However, Fisher cheats on her again during New Year's Eve and Ashleigh dumps him.
Officer Huck	Kevin Kirkpatrick	Chapter 1 -
A campus security guard who is despised by both Kappa Tau and Omega Chi. He started working at CRU during homecoming Rusty's freshman year.
Dr. Milton Hastings	Dan Castellaneta	Chapter 1 & Chapter 4 - Chapter 6
Rusty's grouchy adviser. He was also Rusty and Dale's physics professor in their freshman year. When they first met, he hazed their class by giving an impossible assignment. Later, he reluctantly becomes Rusty's sponsor for the Wyatt Grant.
Dana Stockwell	Martha MacIsaac	Chapter 5 - Chapter 6
An engineering student whom Dr. Hastings appointed to be Rusty's assistant. She has had a crush on Rusty since freshman year. Though they were antagonistic at first, they start dating. In Season 4 Rusty and Dana break-up due to fighting over the grant project.
Michael	Max Greenfield	Chapter 2 - Chapter 3
Ashleigh's French TA and Calvin's ex-boyfriend. He exposes Calvin to a gay lifestyle but Calvin was uncomfortable dating someone so dissimilar to himself that he cheated (with Heath) and later broke up with Michael.
Sheila	Kristen O'Meara	Chapter 4 - Chapter 5
Rusty's and Dale's cougar landlady. She seduces Dale and he loses his virginity to her. Dale proposes to her but Shelia turns him down.
Dean Bowman	Alan Ruck	Chapter 1 - Chapter 6
Dean of Student Affairs of Cyprus-Rhodes University. He enforces strict rules on the Greek system after the article. It is revealed that Bowman was a troublemaker during his time as a student. He is also a member of the secret Amphora Society. He sees a lot of himself in Cappie.
Lana	Olivia Munn	Chapter 5
An attractive waitress at a catering company that Evan and Cappie worked for. She is the female counterpart to Cappie in personality. Cappie and Lana briefly dated.
Joel	Samuel Page	Chapter 5 - Chapter 6
A legislative aide who worked for Rebecca's father. Rebecca introduces him to Casey to help her get into politics. He helps Casey prepare for the LSAT. In the process, he develops feelings for Casey.
Tina	Lisa Wilhoit	Chapter 2
An overbearing student who joins and takes charge of Dale's USAG (University Students Against Greeks) group. She also had a fling with Rusty and gives him Crab louse.
Professor Sommerfield	Damien Leake	Chapter 4 - Chapter 5
An art history professor who takes a lot of pleasure in his work.
Lisa Lawson	Arielle Vandenberg	Chapter 1 & 3
A promiscuous girl whose nickname is the “Virgin Whisper”. Rusty got his nickname "Spitter" by spitting tequila in her face during rush.
Drew Collins	Jesse Williams	Chapter 2 - Chapter 3
Ashleigh's “hotness monster” during spring break. Ashleigh and Casey both compete for his affections however he only had feelings for Casey.
Dr. Larson	John Rubinstein	Chapter 5
Dale's sponsor for the Wyatt Grant. He is very proud of his accomplishments.
Russell Cartwright	Jerry Lambert	Chapter 2 & Chapter 5
Casey and Rusty's father. He is a professor and shares Rusty's nerdy personality. He has a better relationship with Rusty than Casey.
Jonathan Chambers	Kevin Kilner	Chapter 1, 4 & 6
The head of the Chambers family conglomerate and Evan's father. He is an alumnus of Cyprus-Rhodes and Omega Chi.
Ken Logan	Thomas Calabro	Chapter 2 & Chapter 5
The former Ohio senator and Rebecca's father. His corrupt and philandering activities led to his divorce and subsequent resignation. He appears to have turned a new leaf and hopes to repair his relationship with his family.
Mim Chambers	Kathryn Harrold	Chapter 1, 3 & 4
Evan's elitist mother who is on the alumni board at Princeton University. She took a liking to Frannie and dislike to Casey when each was dating Evan.
Sanjay, Sumir and Ted	Danny Pudi, Arshad Aslam & K.T. Tatara	Chapter 1 - Chapter 2
Members of the Purity Pledge group led by Dale that promoted abstinence. Their meetings took place in Rusty and Dale's dorm room. They also were a part of Dale's USAG group and Dale's band, Darwin Lied.
