= Scarecrow (2002 film) =

- DVD cover
- Directed by: Emmanuel Itier
- Written by: Jason White; Emmanuel Itier; Bill Cunningham
- Produced by: Emmanuel Itier; S. Lee Taylor; Tanya York
- Starring: Tiffany Shepis; Roxanna Bina; Jen Richey; John Moore; Richard Elfman
- Music by: Vincent Gillioz
- Distributed by: Peacock Films; Sunrise Entertainment
- Release date: December 30, 2002
- Running time: 86 minutes
- Country: United States
- Language: English

Scarecrow is a 2002 American direct-to-video slasher film, directed by Emmanuel Itier. It has been described as a B movie and stars scream queen Tiffany Shepis and Tim Young among others, including director and cofounder of Oingo Boingo Richard Elfman. The film is described as "so bad it's good", due to its poor acting, writing, and overall story.

Scarecrow was coupled with the second film as Scarecrow/Scarecrow Slayer on 28 December 2004.

== Plot ==
Three youths gather in a cornfield to tell each other scary stories. One of them, Mitch, tells a tale about a boy named Lester Dwervick. Lester is a social outcast whose teacher demeans him for his living in a trailer park with his frequent drunken mother who often brings home drunks from the local bar. Lester is also constantly picked on and harassed by the student body at Emerald Grove High School. The only one who doesn't torment Lester is Judy Patterson, the local sheriff's daughter. Lester shows a drawing he made to Stephanie for choosing him to be her science partner and asks her to go to the prom with him, however his affection is met with scoff and ridicule. Lester trudges his way home to find his mother passed out from drinking. Since he has nobody to confide in and in order to give himself hope for the future Lester often draws pictures of birds.

Later Lester goes to The French Bulldog, the local fast food joint where he works. There, he is met with his usual torment. Judy stands up for him, but unfortunately when she brings it to the attention of Lester's boss, this only results in her getting thrown out.

Being driven home, Judy voices her frustration of her friend, Morgan's, attitude toward Lester, and angrily decides to walk the rest of the way. Later, Lester thanks Judy for standing up for him. That night he draws a bird of paradise as a form of repayment. Morgan persuades Judy to come to a party, while Lester is at home being harassed by his mother's newest boyfriend. Frustrated and angry, Lester goes to the party to meet Judy again where he sees one of his bullies drunkenly kiss her. Judy sees Lester, who runs away in grief.

Lester unleashes all his rage at his mother's boyfriend. The drunk seizes Lester by the throat and forces him into the cornfields outside his home where he strangles him to death then hangs him, making it look like a suicide, leaving his corpse near a scarecrow. No one mourns him, except his mother.

Later, one night the drunken boyfriend is decapitated with a scythe wielded by the same scarecrow Lester's body was found near. Then another is killed by the scarecrow in the same cornfield Lester was. Stephanie reports the murder to the police but her story is met with skepticism. Farmer Hayley finds blood on his scarecrow and on some corncobs, and the boy's body is later found by two locals. The next night two others are killed by the scarecrow who rams two scythes into their heads, then the bully who kissed Judy is killed when the scarecrow brutally shoves a corn cob through his neck. That night the scarecrow kills Lester's teacher by impaling her with a metal pointing stick, then comes home to his mother's trailer where he kills her latest boyfriend with a frying pan. He then explains how he came to be and that he no longer feels or cares about anything.

The scarecrow goes to The French Bulldog and kills his former boss by burning his face on a hot stove. The cops go to Lester's mother to find her in a state of shock then go to Farmer Hayley who tells them that the town is haunted and a dwelling place for evil. Another one of Lester's tormentor's has his heart torn out through his back. That night the scarecrow kills the cemetery caretaker by decapitation with his own shovel. Lastly the scarecrow confronts Judy. In a fight between him, Judy and the two cops Judy manages to throw gasoline on the scarecrow before setting him on fire seemingly killing him.

Mitch narrates that this only made Lester stronger and that he still haunts the cornfields. The two others ask what happened to those who survived: Stephanie went crazy and now resides at a mental institute away from Emerald Grove. Farmer Hayley found God and prays every day for Him to rid his fields of evil. Lester's mother became pregnant again and Mitch expresses hope that she will be a good mother. As for Judy, she enrolled in the College courses with Morgan. Morgan tells Judy the paramedics found her in a trance to which Judy confirms. Judy tells Morgan they should have a sleepover sometime. Later in art class Judy sketches a drawing of a human-bird hybrid implying she is possessed by Lester's soul. The two other youths say Mitch is going too far, however Mitch says he hasn't given them the surprise ending. Mitch then begins whispering "Lester" over and over. As the other two are about to leave, the scarecrow leaps down from the pole and kills them while Mitch laughs with macabre relish.

== Cast ==
- Tiffany Shepis as Judy Patterson
- Roxanna Bina as Stephanie
- Todd Rex as The Scarecrow
- Tim Young as Lester Dwervick
- Jen Richley as Morgan
- John Moore as Chad
- Richard Elfman as Sheriff Patterson / Hewitt
- Mark Irvingsen as Farmer Hailey
- Belinda Gavin as Rhonda Dwervick

== Sequels ==
Scarecrow is followed by two sequels: Scarecrow Slayer and Scarecrow Gone Wild.
