= A Season for Miracles =

- Based on: A Season for Miracles by Marilyn Pappano
- Written by: Maria Nation
- Directed by: Michael Pressman
- Starring: Carla Gugino; Patty Duke; Laura Dern; David Conrad; Mae Whitman
- Music by: Craig Safan
- Country of origin: United States
- Original language: English

Production
- Executive producers: Richard Welsh; Brent Shields
- Producer: Timothy M. Bourne
- Cinematography: Shelly Johnson
- Editor: Lori Jane Coleman
- Running time: 90 minutes
- Production company: Hallmark Hall of Fame

Original release
- Network: CBS
- Release: December 12, 1999

A Season for Miracles is a 1999 American made-for-television Christmas drama film based on a novel of the same name by Marilyn Pappano. Directed by Michael Pressman, it originally aired as a Hallmark Hall of Fame presentation on CBS on December 12, 1999.

== Plot summary ==
Emilie Thompson (Carla Gugino) is forced to take charge of her nephew J.T. (Eve Sabara (Note: Originally credited as Evan Sabara; Eve came out as a trans woman in 2020.)) and niece Alanna (Mae Whitman) when their drug-addicted mother (Laura Dern) overdoses and the children are threatened with foster care. Fleeing the authorities, the trio come across the sleepy Rhode Island town of Bethlehem, just before Christmas. Even though the authorities have been temporarily left behind, Emilie will need a miracle to keep her family together. A versatile guardian angel (Patty Duke), who assumes a variety of earthly guises, helps, along with the small town-folk who are surprisingly friendly. One "coincidence" after another gives the struggling family a chance at happiness.

== Cast ==
- Carla Gugino as Emilie Thompson
- Kathy Baker as Ruth Doyle
- David Conrad as Police Captain Nathan Blair
- Laura Dern as Berry Thompson
- Patty Duke as Angel
- Lynn Redgrave as Hon. Judge Nancy Jakes
- Mary Fogarty as Agatha
- Faith Prince as Sadie Miller
- Eve Sabara as J.T. Thompson (Credited as Evan Sabara)
- Mae Whitman as Alanna 'Lani' Thompson
- Mary Louise Wilson as Corinna
- Kurt Deutsch as Alexander Foster
- Scott Sowers as Deputy Howie
- Paul Collins as Gerald Foster
- Gail Grate as Holly McBride

== Critical reception ==
Ray Richmond of Variety called the film "a holiday grab bag of improbability stacked atop improbability."

== See also ==
- List of Christmas films
- List of films about angels
