= David Conrad =

American actor

- Born: August 17, 1967 (age 59); Pittsburgh, Pennsylvania, U.S
- Education: Brown University; Juilliard School
- Occupation: Actor
- Years active: 1994–present

David Conrad is an American actor. From 2005 to 2010, he starred in the television series Ghost Whisperer alongside Jennifer Love Hewitt. He is still periodically active.

== Early life ==
Conrad is the youngest of three sons born to James Watson Conrad, an engineer, and Margaret Clement Conrad, a librarian. He is a great-grandson of electrical engineer Frank Conrad, a grand-nephew of Martin W. Clement, who was president of the Pennsylvania Railroad from 1935 to 1948, and a great-grandson of Maj. General Charles M. Clement, commander of the 28th Division. Conrad is a native of Swissvale, Pennsylvania, and grew up on the border of Edgewood, both suburbs of Pittsburgh. In the early 1980s, he transferred as a sophomore from Swissvale High School to The Kiski School, an all-boys preparatory school in Saltsburg, Pennsylvania, on a scholarship. Conrad graduated from The Kiski School in 1985. He studied history at Brown University, and began acting while he was there. He left Brown in 1990 and worked as a carpenter, a barista, a housepainter, and interviewed former steelworkers for a historical society in Pittsburgh.

He then went on to study theatre at New York’s prestigious Juilliard School as a member of the Drama Division's Group 25 (1992–1996). While at Juilliard, Conrad appeared in a stage adaptation of John Irving's novel The Cider House Rules, written by Peter Parnell and co-directed by actor Tom Hulce. In 1995 he left Juilliard prior to completing his final year, in order to accept a role in the film Snow White in the Black Forest starring Sigourney Weaver (released in 1997 on Showtime as Snow White: A Tale of Terror).

== Career ==
Conrad made his feature film debut with a small role in the 1994 film Under Heat. In 1996, he won a role as Leo Roth on the television series Relativity; however, he was already committed to a Pittsburgh production of the Tom Stoppard play Arcadia. Because the producers felt Conrad was right for the part, production on the series was later scheduled to accommodate his work on the play. Conrad went on to appear in the 1998 film Return to Paradise with Vince Vaughn and Anne Heche.

Continuing with his stage career, Conrad made his Broadway debut as Blythe Danner's much younger lover in a revival of Terence Rattigan's The Deep Blue Sea in 1998. He went on to appear in off-Broadway productions of Troilus and Cressida, Richard II and Tom Stoppard's Indian Ink. Most recently, in June 2009, he performed as Pale in the play Burn This at the New Hazlett Theater in Pittsburgh. In 1999, Conrad appeared in the TV drama The Weekend with Gena Rowlands and Brooke Shields. That same year he appeared in the Hallmark Hall of Fame television movie A Season for Miracles, opposite Carla Gugino.

He portrayed a naval lieutenant alongside Robert De Niro and Cuba Gooding, Jr. in Men of Honor (2000) and also appeared in recurring roles on the WB series Roswell (1999–2002) and Fox’s dramatic series Boston Public (2000–2005). In 2003, Conrad appeared in a small role in the Woody Allen comedy Anything Else and was cast as Detective Ed Exley in the network adaptation of "L.A. Confidential"; though the pilot was not picked up to series, Conrad soon found work on NBC’s Miss Match, in which he tries to win the heart of professional matchmaker Kate Fox (Alicia Silverstone). The series was pulled after airing 11 of 18 episodes.

In 2005, Conrad appeared in the comedy Wedding Crashers with Vince Vaughn and Owen Wilson, as well as landing a regular role on the CBS series Ghost Whisperer, in which he portrayed Jennifer Love Hewitt’s paramedic husband, Jim Clancy until the series was canceled in 2010. He appeared on an episode of CSI: Miami in 2010. In 2013 he began playing the recurring role of Ian Quinn in the first season of Agents of S.H.I.E.L.D..

In 2019, Conrad returned to Pittsburgh to appear on stage in The Legend of Georgia McBride where he was also interviewed and discussed his ups and downs in the industry.

== Filmography ==
=== Film ===
Year	Film	Role	Notes
1993	Darkness	Vampire	
1996	Under Heat	Simon	
1998	Return to Paradise	Tony Croft	
1999	The Weekend	Lyle	
2000	Men of Honor	Capt. Hanks	
2003	Anything Else	Dr. Phil Reed	
2005	Wedding Crashers	Trap	
2005	Dumpster	Francis Kramer	
2007	Crazy	Ryan Bradford	
2009	Follow the Prophet	Roger Colden	
2011	About Sunny	Ted	
2012	Undaunted: The Forgotten Giants of the Allegheny Observatory	Narrator	
2023	Basic Psych	Dan	Filming

=== Television ===
Year	Title	Role	Notes
1996	Relativity	Leo Roth	Main role, 17 episodes
1997	Snow White: A Tale of Terror	Peter Gutenberg	TV movie
1999	A Season for Miracles	Police Captain Nathan Blair	Hallmark Hall of Fame TV movie
2000	Roswell	Daniel Pierce	Recurring role, 5 episodes
2002	The Time Tunnel	Doug Phillips	Unsold TV pilot
2003	Boston Public	Dave Fields	Recurring role 7 episodes
2003	LA Confidential	Det. Ed Exley	Unsold TV pilot
2003	Miss Match	Michael Mendelson	Main role, 17 episodes
2004	Beck and Call	Matthew	Unsold TV pilot
2005	House M.D.	Marty Hamilton	Episode: "DNR"
2005–2010	Ghost Whisperer	Jim Clancy/Sam Lucas	Main role, 103 episodes
2010	CSI: Miami	Gary Chapman	Episode: "Happy Birthday"
2011	The Good Wife	Judge Clark Willard	Episode: "Marthas and Caitlins"
2012	The Firm	Ben	2 episodes
2012	Beautiful People	Jerry	Unsold TV pilot
2013–2014, 2018	Agents of S.H.I.E.L.D.	Ian Quinn	Recurring role (season 1); Cameo role, Episode: "Inside Voices" (season 5)
2013	Law and Order: Special Victims Unit	Officer West	Episode: "Internal Affairs"
2015	The Curse of the Fuentes Women	Max	Unsold TV pilot
2015	Castle	Frank Kelly	Episode: "At Close Range"
2016	Masters of Sex	Mike Schaeffer	Episode: "Coats Or Keys"
