= Olivia Munn =

American actress (born 1980)

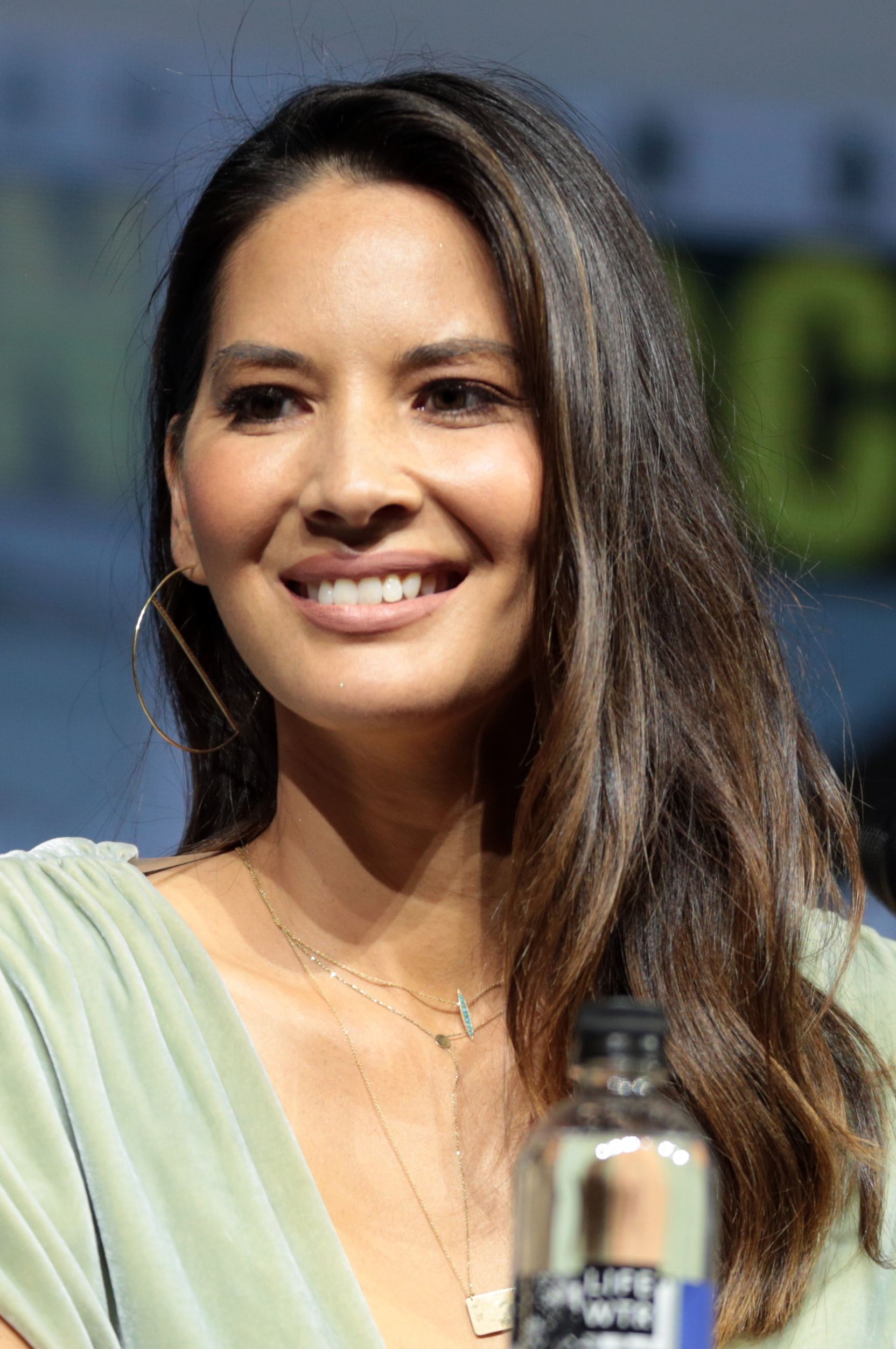
- Munn in 2018
- Born: Lisa Olivia Munn; July 3, 1980 (age 46); Oklahoma City, U.S.
- Education: University of Oklahoma (BA)
- Occupations: Actress; host
- Years active: 1999–present
- Spouse: John Mulaney (m. 2024)
- Children: 2

Lisa Olivia Munn (born July 3, 1980) is an American actress and host. After an internship at a news station in Tulsa, she moved to Los Angeles where she began her professional career as a television host for the gaming network G4, and on the series Attack of the Show! before appearing as a recurring correspondent on the Comedy Central late night series The Daily Show from 2010 to 2011.

On television, Munn has taken roles acting in both Aaron Sorkin's HBO political drama series The Newsroom (2012–2014) and Jonathan Tropper's Apple TV+ dark comedy crime series Your Friends and Neighbors (2025). On film, she has taken leading roles in The Predator (2018), Buddy Games (2019), Love Wedding Repeat (2020), and Violet (2021) with supporting roles in Big Stan (2007), Date Night (2010), Magic Mike (2012), Deliver Us from Evil (2014), Mortdecai (2015), Office Christmas Party (2016), and Ride Along 2 (2016). She portrayed Psylocke in the superhero film X-Men: Apocalypse (2016) and had a voice role in The Lego Ninjago Movie (2017).

Munn is a vocal advocate for women's rights and has used her platform to speak out against anti-Asian harassment. She was named one of Time magazine's Women of the Year for 2025.

== Early life and education ==
Lisa Olivia Munn was born on July 3, 1980, in Oklahoma City to Kimberly Schmid and Winston Munn. Her father is of German, Irish, and English ancestry. Her mother, a Vietnamese of Chinese ancestry, arrived in the United States as a refugee in 1975 after the Vietnam War, settling in Oklahoma, where she met Munn's father. Munn has two brothers and two sisters.

Later, Munn's parents divorced, and her mother married a United States Air Force officer. The family then moved to Utah, where they resided until 1986. Munn's stepfather then transferred to Yokota Air Base, and she spent her formative years in Tokyo. She has recalled how her stepfather was "verbally abusive" and demeaning:

When [he] would be screaming his head off in the living room, I would hustle everybody into my room and launch into imitations of teachers or do scenes from movies. And that would take their minds off of the hell that was happening down the hall.

When Munn was 16, her mother divorced her stepfather and moved with the children back to Oklahoma City. Munn attended Putnam City North High School for her junior and senior years, then attended the University of Oklahoma, where she earned a B.A. in journalism with a minor in Japanese and dramatic arts.

== Career ==
=== 2004–2009: Career beginnings and acting ===
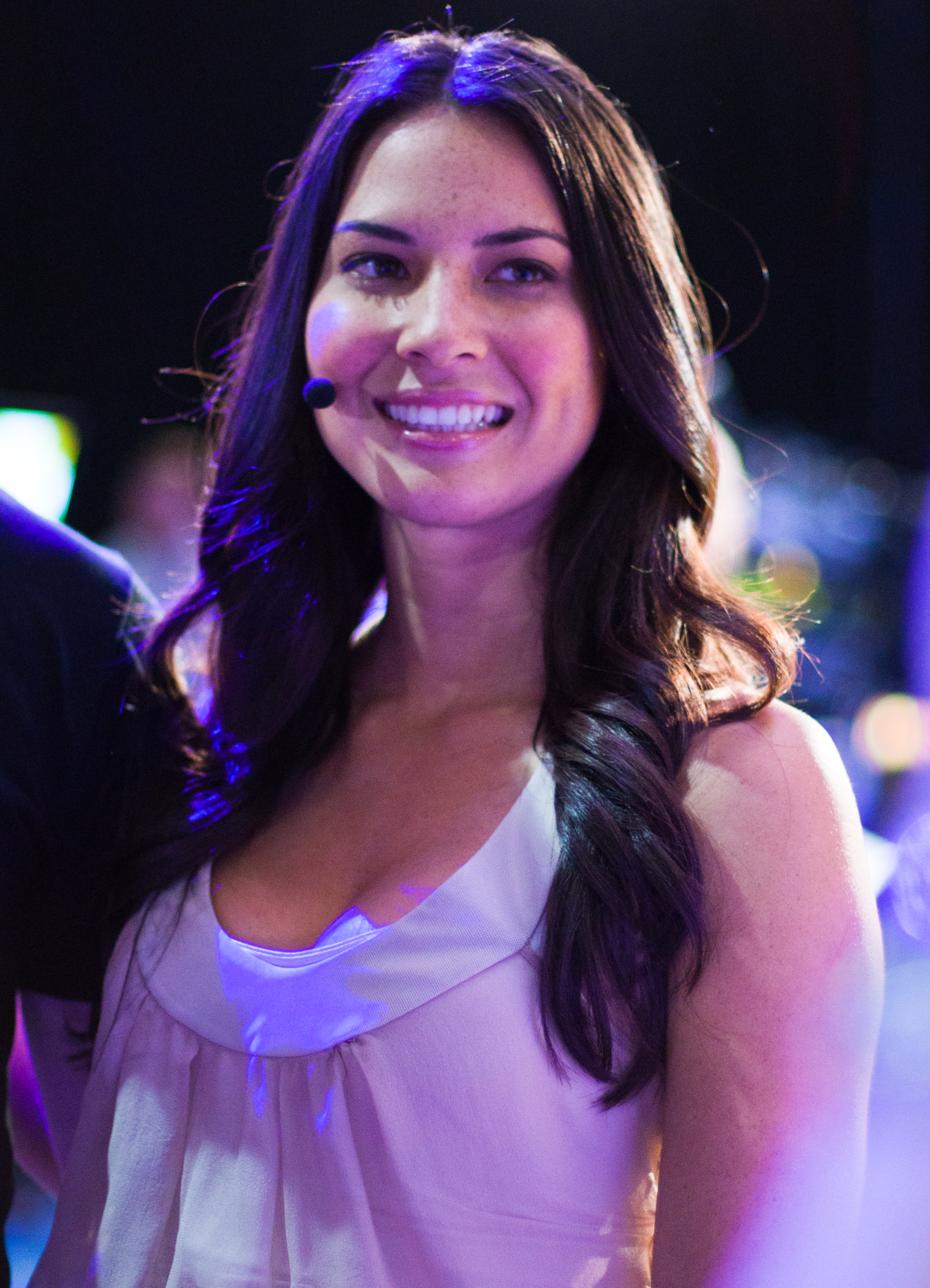
Munn at the 2009 Electronic Entertainment Expo

Munn worked as an intern at NBC affiliate KJRH-TV in Tulsa before relocating to Los Angeles. In 2004, she interned at Fox Sports Networks and worked as a sideline reporter for college football and women's basketball. She said that she disliked the experience: "I was trying to be something I wasn't, and that made me really uncomfortable on live TV." She soon moved to Los Angeles, where she was cast in a small role in the direct-to-video horror film Scarecrow Gone Wild. She appeared in rock band Zebrahead's music video for their song "Hello Tomorrow" as the love interest of lead singer Justin Mauriello. She also appeared in National Lampoon's Strip Poker, filmed at Hedonism II, a naturist resort in Negril, Jamaica, with Kato Kaelin. The films aired on DirecTV and In Demand pay-per-view.

In late 2005, Munn began her role as teen surfer Mily Acuna over two seasons of the television drama Beyond the Break, which aired during Noggin's teen block, The N. She enjoys surfing and continues to practice the sport. She originally auditioned for the role of Kai Kealoha, but the producers wanted a "local girl". She also appeared in the film The Road to Canyon Lake.

In 2006, Munn won a contest put out to the public to find a replacement for departing co-host Kevin Rose on the popular G4 network program Attack of the Show! She then began co-hosting with Kevin Pereira on April 10. She replaced temporary co-host Sarah Lane. The network, devoted to the world of video games and the video games lifestyle, was at first hesitant to hire Munn. Although she admits video games were her "weak point", she was confident in her technical knowledge. On the show, she was featured with journalist Anna David in a segment called "In Your Pants", which deals with sex and relationship questions from viewers. While working on Attack of the Show!, she hosted Formula D, a now defunct program about American drift racing, and an online podcast called Around the Net, formerly known as The Daily Nut, for G4. She left Attack of the Show! in December 2010 and was replaced by Candace Bailey. She appeared in the Rob Schneider film Big Stan (2007), where she played Schneider's character's receptionist Maria. She had a significant role in the horror film Insanitarium, where she played a nurse at an asylum.

=== 2010–2014: The Newsroom and breakthrough ===
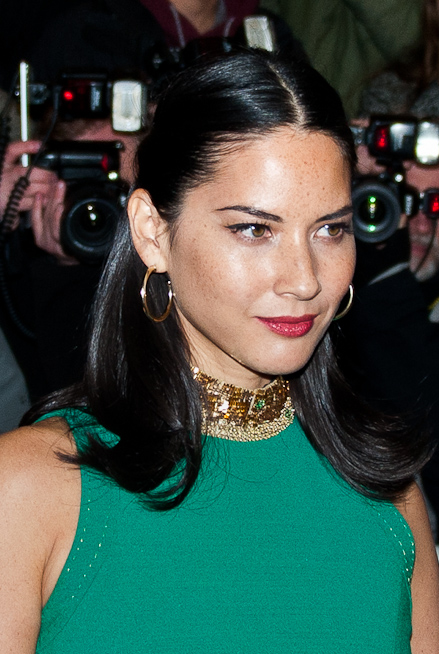
Munn at the 2013 Harper's Bazaar Women of the Year Awards

She had roles in the films Date Night (2010) and Iron Man 2 (2010). Robert Downey Jr. praised Munn for her improvisation skills and led the crew in a round of applause. Munn hosted Microsoft's Bing-a-thon, an advertisement on Hulu for the Microsoft search-engine Bing, on June 8, 2009, alongside Jason Sudeikis. Munn appeared in ABC Family's Greek, portraying Cappie's love interest, Lana. In May 2010, NBC announced that Munn would star on the television series Perfect Couples. The half-hour romantic comedy premiered on January 20, 2011. The series was canceled before it completed its first season run.

On June 3, 2010, Munn debuted in her new role as a correspondent on Comedy Central's The Daily Show. Her credentials were questioned by Irin Carmon of the website Jezebel, who suggested that Munn was better known as a sex symbol than as a comedian. Carmon's column was denounced by Munn and the Daily Show's female writers, producers, and correspondents, 32 of whom posted a rebuttal on the show's website in which they asserted that the description of the Daily Show office given by the Jezebel piece was not accurate. She went on to appear in 16 more episodes as a correspondent from June 2010 to September 2011, with TV Guide naming her signature segment "Tiger Mothering", in which she mocked the high expectations of Chinese mothers, in part by interviewing her own mother. Her last episode as a correspondent aired September 2, 2011. She returned for a brief segment in host Jon Stewart's final show on August 6, 2015.

In 2010, Munn guest-starred on NBC's comedy-drama Chuck as a CIA agent. In 2011, Munn appeared in the comedy film I Don't Know How She Does It (2011) as Momo. In 2012, Munn had a leading role in The Babymakers, a minor role in Freeloaders, and appeared in Magic Mike, directed by Steven Soderbergh. She also appeared as Angie, Nick's stripper girlfriend, in three episodes in season two of FOX's sitcom New Girl.

Munn gained prominence in a lead role in Aaron Sorkin's drama series The Newsroom on HBO. In the series, she played Sloan Sabbith, an economist who worked on the show's fictional news network, ACN, alongside lead anchor Will McAvoy (Jeff Daniels). The series ran for three seasons from 2012 to 2015. Since then, Munn and her costar Thomas Sadoski have discussed with Sorkin their desire for the show to return.

Munn played a correspondent in "True Colors", the May 12, 2014 episode of the Showtime documentary series Years of Living Dangerously in which she interviewed Washington State Governor Jay Inslee about his efforts to reduce CO_{2} emissions in his home state. As of June 2014, Munn has been hired as the main promoter of Proactiv acne cleanser products starring in several commercials and one infomercial for the product. The commercials show Munn experiencing acne herself.

=== 2015–present ===
Beginning in January 2015, Munn voiced the character Phoebe Callisto on the Disney Junior animated series Miles from Tomorrowland. In 2016, Munn was cast as Elizabeth Braddock / Psylocke in X-Men: Apocalypse (for which she turned down an offer to appear in the Deadpool film of that same year). Though the film received mixed reviews, it was a financial success, grossing over $500 million worldwide. The same year, Munn had a leading role portraying a technical supervisor in the comedy film Office Christmas Party.

She also had a starring role in the television series Six as a CIA operative and appeared on Season 13 of America's Got Talent as a guest judge in the season's second Judge Cuts episode. Munn also starred as a biologist in the 2018 science fiction horror film The Predator, the fourth installment in the Predator franchise. Following the film's release, it was revealed that Munn's co-star, Steven Wilder Striegel, with whom she shared a scene, was a registered sex offender who had preyed on a 14-year-old girl. Upon learning of this, Munn informed her fellow cast members, and requested that the scene (Striegel's sole appearance in the film) be cut from the film, which 20th Century Fox agreed to.

Munn subsequently had a lead role in the Netflix-released romantic comedy film Love Wedding Repeat (2020), a remake of the French feature Plan de Table, and the film The Gateway (2021), about a social worker assigned to the care of the daughter of a single mother (played by Munn) who intervenes when the dad returns from prison and lures them into a life of crime.

From 2021 to 2024, Munn voiced the supervillainness Akiko Yokohama / Lady Bullseye II in the adult animated series Hit-Monkey. In 2025, she began starring in the Apple TV+ drama series Your Friends and Neighbors alongside Jon Hamm and Amanda Peet.

She was named one of Time's Women of the Year for 2025.

== In print ==
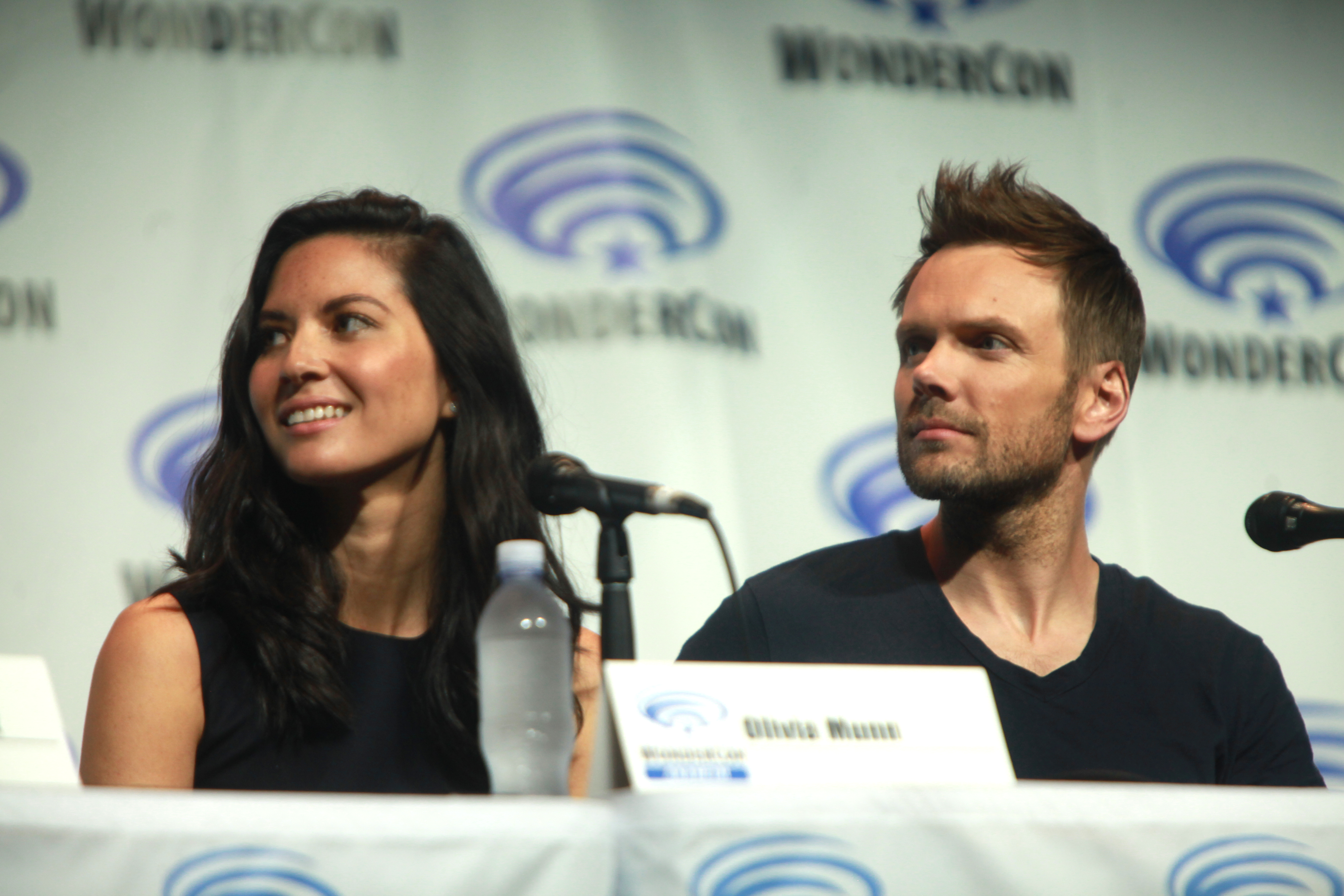
Munn with Deliver Us from Evil co-star Joel McHale at the 2014 WonderCon

Munn has appeared in advertising campaigns for Nike, Pepsi and Neutrogena. She appeared on the Fall 2006 cover of Foam magazine in September, in Men's Edge magazine in August, and was featured in a pictorial in Complex in November 2006, where she later became a columnist. In February 2007, she appeared as "Babe of the Month" in a non-nude pictorial in Playboy magazine. She discusses this shoot in her book Suck it, Wonder Woman: The Misadventures of a Hollywood Geek.

Munn also appeared in the July/August 2007 issue of Men's Health. In September 2007, she was featured in the Italian Vanity Fair for their "Hot Young Hollywood" Issue. Munn appeared in the Winter/Spring 2009 issue of Men's Health Living. She was featured as the cover girl for the July/August 2009 issue of Playboy, and later on the cover of the January 2010 and February 2011 issues of Maxim. Munn appears on the cover of the January 2012 issue of FHM magazine. She was voted #2 by readers on Maxim's list of their Hot 100 Women of 2012.

Munn's book Suck It, Wonder Woman was released on July 6, 2010. In a review for Time Out New York, Olivia Giovetti said that the book offers glimpses into Munn's life, but does not go into depth.

== Activism and charity work ==
In 2011, Munn teamed up with Dosomething.org's Green Your School Challenge. She was a spokesperson for the campaign by filming a PSA regarding the challenge, and sat on the panel of judges that evaluated the entries.

Munn helped PETA with a campaign that ultimately freed an ill elephant from a touring circus. Her blog for The Huffington Post was credited with encouraging fans to contact the USDA on the elephant's behalf. Munn posed for PETA's "I'd Rather Go Naked Than Wear Fur" campaign in April 2010, and again in January 2012. In February 2013, Munn fronted a PETA release of new footage showing cruelty to animals in Chinese fur farms. She appears in the 2021 short film Save Ralph, a film by Humane Society International about animal testing.

Munn has used her platform to speak out against anti-Asian sentiments, harassment, and assaults following the COVID-19 pandemic. Munn was part of a roundtable discussion alongside Stop AAPI Hate co-founder Russell Jeung, RISE founder and CEO Amanda Nguyen with CBS News entitled "Asian Americans Battling Bias: Continuing Crisis."

== Personal life ==
With regard to the subject matter in Deliver Us from Evil, Munn has said that "I didn't believe in the supernatural before this movie." However, after viewing footage from the New York City Police Department of alleged real-life exorcisms, she said "I'm a full believer [now]."

Munn is fluent in Japanese, Vietnamese and English. She is a black belt in taekwondo.

In November 2017, Munn accused film director Brett Ratner of repeated instances of sexual harassment, as well as an instance of sexual assault. She has supported the #MeToo and Time's Up movements with both personal efforts and public statements.

From 2014 to 2017, Munn was in a relationship with NFL quarterback Aaron Rodgers. In 2021, she began a relationship with comedian John Mulaney and, in September of that year, the pair announced that Munn was pregnant. Their son Malcolm was born on November 24, 2021. Their son's middle name, Hiệp, is in honor of Munn's Vietnamese heritage. Munn and Mulaney married in July 2024 in New York. Their second child, a daughter named Méi June, was born via surrogate on September 14, 2024. They reside in Orange County, California.

In March 2024, Munn revealed that she had been diagnosed with breast cancer the previous year. Munn announced that she had four surgeries in the previous ten months, including a double mastectomy. Munn described the cancer as "aggressive" and "fast moving", but said it was caught with "enough time that I had options".

== Filmography ==
=== Film ===
Year	Title	Role	Notes
2004	Scarecrow Gone Wild	Girl #1	as Lisa Munn
2004	National Lampoon's Strip Poker	Herself	as Lisa Munn
2005	The Road to Canyon Lake	Asian mob girl	as Lisa Munn
2007	Big Stan	Maria	
2008	Insanitarium	Nancy	
2009	The Slammin' Salmon	Samara Dubois	
2010	Date Night	Claw Hostess	
2010	Iron Man 2	Chess Roberts	
2010	Jedi Junkies	Herself	
2011	I Don't Know How She Does It	Momo Hahn	
2012	Magic Mike	Joanna	
2012	The Babymakers	Audrey Macklin	
2012	Freeloaders	Madeline	
2014	Unity	Narrator	Documentary
2014	Deliver Us from Evil	Jen Sarchie	
2015	Mortdecai	Georgina Krampf	
2016	Ride Along 2	Maya Cruz	
2016	Zoolander 2	Herself	
2016	X-Men: Apocalypse	Elizabeth Braddock / Psylocke	
2016	Office Christmas Party	Tracey Hughes	
2017	The Lego Ninjago Movie	Koko	Voice
2018	Ocean's 8	Herself	Uncredited
2018	The Predator	Casey Brackett	
2019	Buddy Games	Tiffany	
2019	Dick Move	Agatha	
2020	Love Wedding Repeat	Dina	
2021	Violet	Violet	
2021	Save Ralph	A rabbit	Short film
2021	America: The Motion Picture	Thomas Edison	Voice
2021	The Gateway	Dhalia Jode	

=== Television ===
Year	Title	Role	Notes
2006–2010	Attack of the Show!	Herself	Co-host
2006–2007	Beyond the Break	Mily Acuna	Recurring role (seasons 1–2); 9 episodes
2008–2009	Sasuke	Herself	Competitor; 2 episodes
2009	Greek	Lana	4 episodes
2009	Dave Knoll Finds His Soul	Girl #1	Television film
2010	Accidentally on Purpose	Nicole	Episode: "Face Off"
2010–2011, 2025, 2026	The Daily Show	Herself	Correspondent
2010	Chuck	Greta	Episode: "Chuck Versus the Anniversary"
2010–2011	Perfect Couples	Leigh	Main role
2011	Robot Chicken	Dr. Liz Wilson	Voice, episode: "Kramer vs. Showgirls"
2012–2014	The Newsroom	Sloan Sabbith	Main role
2012	Paulilu Mixtape	Katie	Episode: "Ghost Tits"
2012–2013	New Girl	Angie	3 episodes
2013	The High Fructose Adventures of Annoying Orange	Fudgie	Voice, episode: "Orange Say Knock You Out"
2015–2018	Miles from Tomorrowland	Captain Phoebe Liang Callisto	Main voice role
2018	23rd Critics' Choice Awards	Herself	TV special host
2018	Six	Gina Cline	Main role
2019	The Rook	Monica Reed	Main role
2021	The Demi Lovato Show	Herself	Episode: "Olivia Munn Speaks Up & Fights Back"
2021–2024	Hit-Monkey	Akiko Yokohama / Lady Bullseye II	Main voice role
2022	Tales of the Walking Dead	Evie	Episode: "Evie / Joe"
2025–present	Your Friends & Neighbors	Samantha 'Sam' Levitt	Main role

=== Music videos ===
Year	Title	Artist(s)	Role
2004	"Hello Tomorrow"	Zebrahead	Girlfriend
2010	"The Girl At The Video Game Store"	Parry Gripp	Cashier
2016	"Where's the Love?"	The Black Eyed Peas featuring The World	Herself
2019	"Graduation"	Benny Blanco and Juice Wrld	Greta
2021	"Cutthroat"	Imagine Dragons	Herself

== Bibliography ==
- Munn, Olivia; Montandon, Mac (2010). Suck It, Wonder Woman!: The Misadventures of a Hollywood Geek. New York: St. Martin's Press. ISBN 978-0-312-59105-2.
