= From Up Here =

- The Killing episode
- Episode no.: Season 3 Episode 11
- Directed by: Phil Abraham
- Written by: Eliza Clark
- Production code: BDH311/S311
- Original air date: August 4, 2013

Episode chronology
← Previous "Six Minutes"	Next → "The Road to Hamelin"
- The Killing (season 3)

"From Up Here" is the thirty-seventh episode of the American television drama series The Killing, which aired on August 4, 2013, as the first of a two-part season finale. The episode is written by Eliza Clark and directed by Phil Abraham. In the episode, Stephen Holder (Joel Kinnaman) and Sarah Linden (Mireille Enos) are called to another case, which has similarities to the recently solved one. Holder suspects a cop has committed all the murders. They find clues which cause Linden to deduce that Adrian Seward was the target in 2009 and not his mother, as Adrian is followed home by a car whose driver he recognizes.

== Plot ==
After a morning jog, Linden returns home to find James Skinner (Elias Koteas) sitting on her front step. He tells her that his wife asked him to leave and he thinks his marriage is over. He has lied to his family about his work to spare them the atrocities of the case. When he suggests to Linden that people like the two of them are supposed to be alone, she kisses him.

Holder attends Bullet's funeral. Danette (Amy Seimetz) sits beside him. She tells him about relating to Bullet the hide-and-seek game that she played with Kallie. He tells her that Bullet tried to protect Kallie as best she could. He leaves and she sees Lyric (Julia Sarah Stone) sitting up front. Holder goes to apologize to Caroline (Jewel Staite) for their argument. They compare their levels of dating and she considers him better than her usual lawyer dates. He gets called away to the next case.

At the prison, Evan Henderson (Aaron Douglas) packs up Ray Seward's belongings. He talks with Francis Becker (Hugh Dillon), who appears to be cleaning out his locker. Becker states that he has too much going on at home and has decided to retire and take his pension. He cautions him about becoming a "prisoner" to his job. Henderson thinks he will be fine.

Holder arrives at a crime scene of a burned-out car with a body inside it. Linden explains the details — unknown gender of the body with two shell casings near it.

Danette eats at a fast-food restaurant where Lyric works. They bond over Bullet and Kallie, and Danette offers to style Lyric's hair for free. At the apartment, Twitch (Max Fowler) looks for a lighter and finds drugs in his coat pocket.

At the station, Holder apologizes to Reddick (Gregg Henry) for the assault. Reddick has asked for a new partner and been assigned to Jablonski. He tells Holder that his wife has filed a complaint with Skinner, but he has taken care of it. "Cops don't rat on cops," Reddick says. Holder thanks him.

Skinner tells Linden that the district attorney is formally pressing charges against Joe Mills. He also mentions missing Linden as a partner and suggests she come to his lake house for the weekend. She would love to, but she and Holder have a new case. Holder interrupts to say the coroner has information for them. On the way there, Linden admits to Holder that she and Skinner have frequently been involved since they were partners. Holder supports the idea because she's "human."

On the same bridge from which Kallie peered earlier, Danette closes her eyes and counts as playing hide-and-seek, hoping her daughter will arrive. Lyric roams the streets and is approached by a man in a car who thinks she is a prostitute. Twitch sits on the roof of his apartment building and ponders the drugs, before he tosses them away.

The coroner tells Holder and Linden that the female victim was shot and killed, execution style, within 24 hours. The victim was then burned beyond recognition and her teeth were removed. Identification will be difficult. Holder notices that the ring finger of the victim is missing. The coroner says it was a healed wound from possibly a few weeks ago. Linden suggests that the victim is Angie Gower. Outside in the car, she and Holder discuss the possible killer. He believes that only a cop would know the intimate details about Angie Gower and the previous case. They argue over Joe Mills's involvement. Holder doesn't think Mills is the killer and says Linden would cause another innocent man to die in prison.

They go to the station to retrieve what files they can before all are packed up. Linden surveys the room, looking at her coworkers, including Reddick and Skinner. In the car, Holder asks her for the address of the first victim and goes to the Delahanty household. They speak with the Brigitte's father, Damon (Paul Jarrett), who talks about his daughter being a drug addict. Holder finds a picture of Reddick with Brigitte. Damon says he was a neighbor back then and was helping Brigitte in a junior officer's program.

Outside, Holder and Linden discuss how Reddick is involved in all the murders, including Trisha Seward, when she spots a nearby tree house. She gets a map from the car and tells Holder about Ray Seward mentioning constructing a treehouse for Adrian, but not in the city limits. On the map, she finds the nearest wooded area from the Sewards is close to the pond where the 17 bodies were discovered. In the woods, they find the treehouse and the pond. She climbs to the structure and asks Holder to go to the pond. She clearly sees him and surmises the killer could clearly see Adrian at the time. Adrian was the target, not his mother. As Adrian (Rowan Longworth) walks home from school, a car follows him. Shocked, he soon recognizes the unseen driver.

== Reception ==
=== Critical reception ===
"From Up Here" was reviewed in conjunction with "The Road to Hamelin" as a two-part season finale. Sean McKenna of TV Fanatic stated, "In a two hours that could have easily dragged and become bloated, [the] season finale of The Killing Season 3 found a way to be compelling, exciting, focused on the characters as much as finishing the case, and providing one heck of an ending." The A.V. Club's Phil Dyess-Nugent gave the finale a B+ grade, stating, "The pieces fit, and the revelation that Skinner, the cop who put the wrongly convicted Ray Seward away, was actually covering up his own crimes, alters the story in a way that, if anything, makes more sense, not less."

=== Ratings ===
The two-part season finale was watched by 1.48 million viewers, a slight increase from the second season's finale, as well as the previous episode, and got a 0.5 rating in the 18-49 ages demographic.
