= Head Shots =

- The Killing episode
- Episode no.: Season 3 Episode 4
- Directed by: Michael Rymer
- Written by: Dawn Prestwich; Nicole Yorkin
- Production code: BDH304/S304
- Original air date: June 16, 2013

Episode chronology
← Previous "Seventeen"	Next → "Scared and Running"
- The Killing (season 3)

"Head Shots" is the thirtieth episode of the American television drama series The Killing, which aired on June 16, 2013. The episode was written by series co-executive producers Dawn Prestwich and Nicole Yorkin and is directed by Michael Rymer. In the episode, the 7 Stars Motel and its proprietor (Grace Zabriskie) are investigated as the site for the DVD production. Detective Holder (Joel Kinnaman) attempts to mediate between Linden (Mireille Enos) and Reddick (Gregg Henry). Bullet (Bex Taylor-Klaus) helps Twitch (Max Fowler) when he gets into trouble. Seward (Peter Sarsgaard) rejects his medicine and his guards must persuade him.

== Plot ==
Holder and Linden look on as Bullet watches Kallie (Cate Sproule) on the DVD seized from Goldie's apartment. Bullet says the video was shot at the motel run by Mama Dips (Zabriskie). She also notes that Kallie is wearing the blue ring Bullet gave Kallie when Bullet last saw her days ago. The detectives arrive at the motel with a search warrant. Mama Dips is taken in for questioning after a hidden door is discovered behind the front desk leading to the room seen in the seized pornographic DVDs. Mama Dips insists she knows nothing and then claims to be the voice on the DVDs.

Linden shows Kallie's DVD to Danette (Amy Seimetz). Danette says the man's voice is not familiar, then admits that Kallie stopped by her trailer on the night Kallie disappeared, but she didn't answer the door. Twitch gets into his parole officer's car and is told his urine tested positive for drugs. Twitch insists he's been clean, as he plans to go to Los Angeles. The parole officer forces him to have sex. After shooting up meth at the abandoned hotel, Twitch leaves when Bullet arrives, because she hassles him about the drug abuse. Bullet follows, telling him not to go to Freeway Park. At Freeway Park, Twitch gets brutally beaten by thugs, after ignoring Bullet's warnings to stay away. Bullet takes him back to the hotel room, where he cries about his ruined dreams. Lyric (Julia Sarah Stone) comforts him and they kiss. Bullet leaves.

At the station, Assistant D.A. (and Holder's girlfriend) Caroline Swift (Jewel Staite) recommends Skinner (Elias Koteas) and his team focus on Mama Dips. After the meeting, an officer posts two new photos of identified victims. Linden and Holder match one of them to an image of a girl from the porn videos.

In prison, Becker (Hugh Dillon) and Henderson (Aaron Douglas) escort a bandaged Seward back to his cell. Alton (James Lewis) says Seward removed his tattoo because it was a "point of weakness". Henderson tries to give Seward antibiotics. Seward throws the pills in the toilet. In the prison yard, Alton and Seward bond as Seward shows off various scars. Becker monitors them.

At the station, a cop recognizes one of the girls from the porn video grabs as a girl named Tiffany (Megan Danso). He had recently picked her up for solicitation. Linden questions Tiffany, who claims she can't remember the man in the video. Holder leaves with Reddick (Gregg Henry) to stake out Goldie. In the car, Holder asks Reddick to take it easy on Linden. Reddick warns Holder against putting his career in Linden's hands. Goldie drives by with an unidentified woman in the passenger seat. Holder and Reddick follow him to the retention pond crime scene, where he proclaims his innocence to a mob of reporters there, adding that the woman with him is his mother. He also claims another girl is missing. Danette gets a phone call from her boyfriend. She says she waited up for him last night and agrees to go out that night.

Becker gripes to Henderson about Seward and Alton's bonding, then asks if Seward took his medication. Henderson lies, saying there was no problem. Becker invites Henderson to his house for a beer. At home, Becker has beers with Henderson and confronts him about Seward's medication. Henderson admits Seward didn't take it. Becker's wife privately confides to Henderson about the toll Becker's job has taken on their marriage. At the prison, Seward refuses to take his medication, so Becker orders the guards to beat Alton. Seward reluctantly gives in.

At the station, Skinner criticizes Reddick and Holder for allowing Goldie to attract media scrutiny to the case. Linden asks Holder for help with getting more information out of Tiffany. Constantly annoyed by Reddick, Linden tells him that he hasn't made sergeant after 23 years because all he is simply "in the way." Holder and Linden ride together to go talk to Tiffany. They press Tiffany for more details about the man asking the questions in the video. At the station, he enters Joe Mills' name, which she provided, into a database. An arrest summary reveals that Mills was one of the people arrested at Mama Dips' hotel, and that he was released six hours earlier. Danette opens her door to boyfriend Joe Mills.

== Reception ==
=== Ratings ===
"Head Shots" was watched by 1.36 million viewers and received a 0.4 rating in the 18-49 demographic.

=== Critical reception ===
Phil Dyess-Nugent of The A.V. Club gave the episode a B+ grade, stating, "The case is stalled, but the show is quietly bubbling along. It's powered by the confrontations and outbursts that keep erupting, from the many suppressed pockets of resentment and hostility that keep the show's pulse alive."
