= Reckoning (The Killing) =

- The Killing episode
- Episode no.: Season 3 Episode 9
- Directed by: Jonathan Demme
- Written by: Dan Nowak
- Production code: BDH309/S309
- Original air date: July 21, 2013

Episode chronology
| ← Previous "Try" | Next → "Six Minutes" |
- The Killing (season 3)

"Reckoning" is the thirty-fifth episode of the American television drama series The Killing, which aired on July 21, 2013. The episode is written by Dan Nowak and directed by Jonathan Demme. In the episode, Sarah Linden (Mireille Enos) and Stephen Holder (Joel Kinnaman) seek out Joe Mills (Ryan Robbins) after he attacks Danette Leeds (Amy Seimetz). Their pursuit proves costly to everyone. With Ray Seward's (Peter Sarsgaard) execution scheduled the next day, he desperately accepts Dale Shannon's (Nicholas Lea) suggestion to pray, only to learn his cellblock mate's true nature.

== Plot ==
Early in the morning, Danette puts missing-person flyers of Kallie on cars around the neighborhood. When she gets home, it is ransacked and Mills emerges from the bedroom. Later, a beaten-up Danette tells Linden and Holder that Mills took off with her money and car. She mentions that he frequently camps near the Canada–US border; his camping gear and maps are kept in her storage unit. At the unit, Linden and Holder find a sleeping bag and lit cigarette. Someone was just there. Hearing the elevator, they split up the pursuit. Mills tackles and assaults Linden as she screams for Holder. He knocks Mills off of her then handcuffs him.

As the police investigate the storage unit, Carl Reddick (Gregg Henry) hands Linden a box, which contains the victims' missing rings. As she looks through the box, Linden finds Bullet's necklace. Holder radios an officer near Linden to say they found Mills's cab downstairs with blood on the bumper. Knowing what Holder is about to discover, Linden races downstairs to beg him to not open the trunk. Holder opens it anyway and finds Bullet dead inside.

Linden asks to interrogate Mills but Skinner (Elias Koteas) says he'll only talk to Danette. Linden notes that Kallie's blue ring was not among the rings discovered in the storage unit. Outside, as reporters ask the district attorney about Joe Mills, Caroline Swift (Jewel Staite) talks with Holder in his car, telling him not to blame himself for Bullet's death. When she reminds him of the danger the street kids put themselves in every day, he yells at her, telling her that he was an addict.

In their motel room, Lyric (Julia Sarah Stone) shows Twitch (Max Fowler) a letter stating he's officially off probation. They can finally move to Los Angeles. She asks why he is upset and he tells her Bullet is dead. He later surprises Lyric by paying the deposit on a government-sponsored apartment she had previously mentioned. She asks about L.A. and he says that all he wants is to be with her.

At the station, Linden and a group of officers watch as Danette and Mills talk in the interrogation room. He denies hurting Kallie, but Danette says she knows about the videos. He says he was gentle with the girls on the videos and that he "took care of them." She lunges at him, screaming for him to reveal what he's done to her daughter.

After a psychologist determines Adrian Seward (Rowan Longworth) is stable enough to be a credible witness, Linden talks with him. She shows him a group of mugshots, asking him to point out the man that killed his mother. He points to the photo of Mills and asks to see his father. Having finally established a connection between Mills and Trisha Seward's case, she starts to call Seward until she sees Danette in the station hallway. Linden is shocked when Danette mentions Mills was in Alaska, not Seattle, the night of Trisha's death. He had dropped off their Christmas presents and then went fishing there.

Linden goes to Holder's apartment to find him distraught and drinking. She tells him Adrian falsely identified Mills but contemplates using his testimony to get Seward a stay of execution. Holder warns that she'd be burying evidence. He then says he should've answered Bullet's final phone calls. As Linden comforts him, he leans in to kiss her. She moves away and he apologizes.

At the prison, Seward demands another phone call. Becker (Hugh Dillon) refuses. Dale (Nicholas Lea) tells Seward to not give up hope. Outside in the prison yard, he encourages Seward to pray, which the desperate man kneels to do. Dale laughs at him, saying Alton was easy to "crack." He expected Seward to have been harder. Seward realizes Dale has been playing a game with his fellow inmates.

Inside, Evan Henderson (Aaron Douglas) learns Becker has added him to Seward's execution team. Becker's wife, Annie (Sonya Salomaa) then calls to tell Henderson that Francis shot someone. Becker arrives home to see his son Francis (Colin MacKechnie) being escorted away in handcuffs. A dead body lies on the lawn. Henderson tells Becker his son just murdered a man Annie was seeing.

Holder goes to see Bullet's body at the coroner's office. Tim Jablonski (Phil Granger) tells him that Reddick logged numerous calls from Bullet the previous night. Reddick had dismissed them as another wild goose chase. An enraged Holder goes to Reddick's house and assaults him.

At the station, Skinner (Elias Koteas) tells Linden they matched all but four of the rings to the victims. He asks about Adrian but Linden says there's no connection between Trisha Seward and Joe Mills. The next morning Linden is in her car, outside the prison. She holds the bag containing the four unidentified rings.

== Reception ==
=== Critical reception ===
Alan Sepinwall of HitFix called "Reckoning" "easily the highlight of what's been a very good third season of this show." He added, "It's not perfect, but give credit to Veena Sud for genuinely learning from the mistakes of the first two seasons when she was given another shot at things." Joel Kinnaman was named the "Performer of the Week" by TVLine for his performance in this episode.

=== Ratings ===
The episode was watched by 1.35 million viewers with a rating of 0.4 in the 18-49 ages demographic, marking the season's lowest ratings to date.
