= That You Fear the Most =

- The Killing episode
- Episode no.: Season 3 Episode 2
- Directed by: Lodge Kerrigan
- Written by: Dan Nowak
- Production code: BDH302/S302
- Original air date: June 2, 2013

Episode chronology
← Previous "The Jungle"	Next → "Seventeen"
- The Killing (season 3)

"That You Fear the Most" is the twenty-eighth episode of the American television drama series The Killing, which aired on June 2, 2013, after the season opener. The episode is written by Dan Nowak and is directed by Lodge Kerrigan. In the episode, Detective Holder (Joel Kinnaman) and Detective Reddick (Gregg Henry) continue the investigation and enter the world of the runaways, one of which is now missing. Meanwhile, death row inmate Ray Seward (Peter Sarsgaard) continues to impose his will on the prison and the detectives who arrested him, James Skinner (Elias Koteas) and Sarah Linden (Mireille Enos).

== Plot ==
After visiting the recent crime scene, Linden returns the Kwon file to Holder. They discuss the case, and she suggests it is not the killer's first murder. Holder mentions the girl's missing rings and broken finger, then asks if Seward took "trophies" as well. Linden says no and ends the conversation, wishing him luck on the case. Worried about Kallie (Cate Sproule), Bullet (Bex Taylor-Klaus) leaves her a voicemail and visits Danette (Amy Seimetz), who dismisses Bullet altogether. At police headquarters, Holder sees Bullet giving Kallie's name to the desk sergeant, who has not seen any reports about Kallie. She asks Holder if he has seen Kallie and shows him a picture. In prison, Seward demands to make a phone call. He persuades guard Evan Henderson (Aaron Douglas) by saying he wants to call his lawyer about arrangements to see his son.

Linden visits her old partner, James Skinner, to discuss the Seward case. She says Trisha Seward's finger was broken postmortem and her wedding ring was never found. Skinner reassures Linden that Ray Seward is guilty, then mentions that Seward invited him to his execution. At Linden's car, James' wife Jennifer (Jenn Maclean-Angus) tells her to stay away, that she has forgiven her husband, but never wants to see Linden again. On a ferry, Cody tries to comfort Linden, but she ends their relationship. At the Beacon Home, Holder and Reddick question Pastor Mike (Ben Cotton), who has a tattoo of Ephesians 1:7 on his arm. The pastor says he last saw Ashley Kwon five days ago and mentions that kids sometimes stay at the 7 Star Motel. There, Holder and Reddick show the desk clerk (Grace Zabriskie) a printout of photographs of some Beacon Home kids. Pointing out Ashley, Holder claims a witness saw her at the motel two nights ago. The clerk does not recognize Ashley, then blames Kallie, also on the printout, for spreading misinformation. Outside, Holder remembers Bullet was looking for Kallie and suggests talking to some girls on the street, which Reddick refuses to do.

Downtown, Bullet asks others if they have seen Kallie and starts a fight with Goldie (Brendan Fletcher), a pimp who jokes that Kallie is dead. Goldie pulls a gun but does not fire. At Seward's prison cell, Becker starts reading a description from the execution manual of what happens to a body when hanged. Seward mentions knowing a relative of Becker's, a guard at another prison. Becker continues reading as Seward smiles.

Regi (Annie Corley) finds Linden studying the Seward case file at home. Linden shows Regi the "Picasso drawing" of a grove of trees drawn by Seward's son, Adrian (Rowan Longworth). Regi warns Linden against disrupting the child's life. Linden visits Seward, who tells her Skinner lied in court and called him a coward. When Linden asks what Seward did with his wife's wedding ring, he claims he sold it to a pawn shop but never mentions which one. When she shows him Adrian's drawing, he says he never had a son and leaves for his cell.

At the abandoned hotel, Bullet asks Lyric (Julia Sarah Stone) if she has seen Kallie. Twitch (Max Fowler) mentions that Goldie has a new girl in his apartment. Bullet breaks into Goldie's apartment and hears a woman crying behind a locked door. Goldie sneaks up behind Bullet with a knife, forces her onto his bed, and rapes her.

Linden visits Adrian's foster home and sees him happily playing in the backyard. She notices a drawing on his bedroom wall that is identical to the "Picasso drawing" in the Seward case file, except this drawing has buildings next to the grove of trees. She recognizes the buildings as the abandoned factory where the recent victim was found. Linden returns there with the new sketch. She matches the trees from the drawing with a nearby grove, then makes her way through the trees to discover a pond with scattered corpses rotting in biohazard bags.

== Production ==
In a June 2013 interview, series star Bex Taylor-Klaus spoke about her character, Bullet: "Bullet is a protector, and I feel I sort of fancied myself as that when I was younger, and sort of still do because of bullies. You can say whatever you want to me, you can beat me up, you can punch me, kick me and call me names, but as soon as you do anything to someone I care about, or anyone for that matter, I cannot stand standing idly by. That's part of what makes Bullet so tough: She's gotten her jaw broken five times, and her nose broken three or four times. I'm pretty sure that's pretty much her philosophy; she would die, she would throw herself in front of a knife or a bullet, anything, before she would let one of those other girls on the street get harmed. Her toughness is unique. It's not tough love. It's that she's tough because she has so much love. She cares about people and she can't stand to see them get hurt."

== Ratings ==
"That You Fear the Most" was watched by 1.76 million viewers and received a 0.4 rating in the 18-49 demographic.
