= The Road to Hamelin =

- The Killing episode
- Episode no.: Season 3 Episode 12
- Directed by: Dan Attias
- Written by: Dawn Prestwich; Nicole Yorkin
- Production code: BDH312/S312
- Original air date: August 4, 2013

Episode chronology
← Previous "From Up Here"	Next → "Blood in the Water"
- The Killing (season 3)

"The Road to Hamelin" is the thirty-eighth episode of the American television drama series The Killing, which aired on August 4, 2013, as the second of a two-part season finale. The episode is co-written by series executive producers Dawn Prestwich and Nicole Yorkin and directed by Dan Attias. In the episode, frantic to find Adrian (Rowan Longworth), Stephen Holder (Joel Kinnaman) and Sarah Linden (Mireille Enos) voice their suspicions about Carl Reddick (Gregg Henry) to James Skinner (Elias Koteas). Linden later sees a ring from the missing Kallie on Skinner's daughter's finger. She knows Skinner is the killer and must ride with him to find Adrian. Holder must race to save Linden when Adrian is found safe.

== Plot ==
Holder and Linden ask Adrian's adoptive mother, Tess Clarke (Ingrid Torrance), if she has seen him. She grows worried when his backpack is found in the house and the back door is open. Adrian is missing.

Skinner picks his daughter Bethany (Katherine Evans) up from ballet class. She asks if he loves the "woman from work," meaning Linden. Her mother had told her about the situation. He explains that he can't be someone that he's not, but that he still loves Bethany. She wonders if things will change and he receives a call.

He arrives at the Clarke house, where Holder and Linden tell him about Adrian possibly being abducted. Then, they suggest that they have the wrong man in jail for the murders. Reddick is their suspect. Skinner tells them to continue to search for Adrian, and he will handle the Reddick investigation. Holder and Linden then talk to Cammy Ezer (Jennifer Copping), a neighbor of the Clarkes'. Adrian had come to her house, scared, saying he was being followed. She was too busy to care for him and drove him home.

At the station, Linden mentions security camera footage is being collected from the school to Adrian's house. She and Holder are met at the door by internal affairs agents. They wish to speak to Holder and take him inside. Linden tries to contact Skinner for his help with Holder. She is then given photos of a car following Adrian in several successions.

The IA agents inform Holder they are investigating Holder for several reasons, besides his assault on Reddick. He surrenders his cell phone so they may check it.

When Linden cannot reach Skinner by phone, she goes to his house. He is packing his clothes. She shows him the photo of the car following Adrian and he acts complacent. He tells her that she needs to be more thorough before accusing Reddick. On the way downstairs, his wife and daughter enter and see them together. The daughter is upset with his leaving and they hug. Linden sees Kallie Leeds's ring on Bethany's finger. She deduces that her former partner and lover is the serial killer. Believing that Skinner has Adrian held captive somewhere, she disarms him and forces him to take her to him.

At the station, Holder tells the IA agents to call Skinner and the matter will be cleared up, but the agents inform him that Skinner was the one who filed the complaint, just before Holder arrived. Holder dupes the agents into believing that he has rigged Reddick's car with a bomb; his cell phone is the detonator. Reddick quickly arrives, upset that his family night out was interrupted by the prank. Holder is released and he asks Reddick for help to find Adrian.

In the car, Skinner admits to Linden that he set Holder up with the IAD. At Skinner's home, Holder learns from his wife that Linden was with Skinner. He gets a possible address from the wife. Skinner tells Linden that things would be different if she would've walked away after Joe Mills was arrested. Holder heads out of town, looking at a map to find the address given to him.

In Skinner's car, he claims that the first victim was an accident. She was supposed to be at junior officer's class and missed it. He went to look for her, finding her high on drugs and prostituting. He forced her into his car, struck her after she spat at him, and took her to the woods to keep her from talking to anyone about it. He claims to not remember much after that point. He mentions the exhilaration of killing the "human garbage" that nobody cares about.

Reddick calls Holder. He has found a piece of paper with Adrian's writing on it, saying that, if his father dies, he wants to be with his mother. Holder says that the mother is dead, and Adrian might've meant his foster mother. Reddick investigates further. In the car, Linden suggests that Skinner wanted to kill Adrian for being a witness, but Skinner just wanted to know if the kid remembered him, which he didn't. Skinner was free, until Linden began to help Adrian remember. He insists that he doesn't kill children. She reminds him that some victims were 12 years old and asks why he killed them. He says he didn't need excuses.

He suggests that Linden knows him and that she loved him. That's why she ended up in the psychiatric ward. Linden attacks him for mentioning that, causing him to stop the car. She gets out, exasperated, but knows she must continue the search for Adrian. They resume the ride and she asks where they are. He speaks of a nearby lake and she asks if that is where more bodies are. He says it's one of the places. He remains silent when she asks about Kallie Leeds. When they stop for the final time, he says that he is tired of hiding, confesses to Bullet's murder and easily making Joe Mills the suspect.

Holder arrives at the cabin but finds no one there, not even Adrian. Out of the car, Linden asks where Adrian is and Skinner says that he has been with them the whole time in the car's trunk. Reddick finds Adrian at Trisha Seward's grave and calls Holder. Skinner tells Linden that he lied and regrets killing Adrian. Linden shoots him in the gut and Holder runs toward the sound. He arrives to tell her Adrian is alive, yet she keeps her gun pointed at Skinner, who tells her that she has to be the one to end it. Holder pleads with her to put her gun down and spare him, but is unsuccessful; Linden shoots him in the chest, killing him.

== Production ==
In an August 2013 interview, Mireille Enos (Sarah Linden) talked about her response after reading the script for "The Road to Hamelin": "It's so powerful and intense — and such a surprising twist for TV, to have her kill him. I was definitely surprised but ultimately I'm like, 'What other choice [did she have], considering everything that she's been through?' Veena [Sud] referred to this season as 'Sarah's Inferno'. Considering everything that she had been through, and that he had been the catalyst for that — her greatest potential for love was also the one who had not only done all these heinous crimes but allowed [Seward] to go to death, allowed her to go to this hospital and think that she was crazy, allowed her to be put in a situation where Joe Mills beat her up ... he was responsible for all of these horrifying things. Ultimately I don't know what other choice Sarah would have made."

== Reception ==
=== Critical reception ===
"The Road to Hamelin" was reviewed in conjunction with "From Up Here" as a two-part season finale. Sean McKenna of TV Fanatic stated, "In a two hours that could have easily dragged and become bloated, [the] season finale of The Killing Season 3 found a way to be compelling, exciting, focused on the characters as much as finishing the case, and providing one heck of an ending." The A.V. Club's Phil Dyess-Nugent gave the finale a B+ grade, stating, "The pieces fit, and the revelation that Skinner, the cop who put the wrongly convicted Ray Seward away, was actually covering up his own crimes, alters the story in a way that, if anything, makes more sense, not less."

=== Ratings ===
The two-part season finale was watched by 1.48 million viewers, a slight increase from the second season's finale, as well as the previous episode, and got a 0.5 rating in the 18-49 ages demographic.
