= The Killing season 3 =

The Killing
- Season 3
- Season 3 promotional poster
- No. of episodes: 12

Release
- Original network: AMC
- Original release: June 2 – August 4, 2013

Season chronology
- ← Previous; Season 2 Next → Season 4

The third season of the AMC American crime drama television series The Killing premiered on June 2, 2013, concluded on August 4, 2013, and consisted of 12 episodes. The series was developed and produced by Veena Sud and based on the Danish series, Forbrydelsen (The Crime). Set in Seattle, Washington, this season follows detectives Sarah Linden and Stephen Holder as they investigate a string of murders that connect to a previous case of Linden's. AMC originally announced that they had canceled the series in July 2012, but, in January 2013, officially announced it would return for a third season, which would ultimately be the last to air on AMC. On November 15, 2013, Netflix announced it would produce a fourth and final season to consist of six episodes.

== Plot ==
This season takes place one year after the conclusion of the Rosie Larsen case (the events of the first two seasons). Sarah Linden is brought back into her detective work when the investigation into a runaway girl leads Stephen Holder and new partner Carl Reddick to discover a string of murders which connect to a previous murder case Linden worked on. Linden is now a Transit Authority employee. Meanwhile, Ray Seward, who had been convicted in that case, is sent to death row. In the city, teenage runaways must find ways to survive, while a killer cruises the streets. Holder and Reddick continue the investigation and enter the world of the runaways, one of whom is now missing. Meanwhile, death row inmate Seward continues to impose his will on the prison and the detectives who arrested him, James Skinner and Linden. Skinner creates a task force after Linden, led to a site by a drawing, discovers 17 dead bodies in a pond. Homeless teen Rachel “Bullet” Olmstead points Holder and Reddick to a new suspect. Linden speaks with Adrian (Rowan Longworth), the drawing's creator. Seward is slipped a hidden razor blade in prison. The 7 Stars Motel and its proprietor are investigated as the site for the DVD production. Holder attempts to mediate between Linden and Reddick. Bullet helps Twitch when he gets into trouble. Seward rejects his medicine, and the guards must persuade him to take it. Holder and Linden learn a potential victim has escaped the killer. Bullet assists them to retrace the victim's steps, while also hoping to find Kallie, her missing friend. Kallie's mother, Danette, grows worried and discovers something about her boyfriend Joe. Seward gets a visit from his son's adoptive mother. Holder and Linden revisit the Seward case in hopes of finding a connection with the current one. Bullet takes Danette to Kallie's favorite hangouts. Seward asks to speak to his imprisoned father. Pastor Mike is revealed to not be who he claims to be. Bullet and Lyric get closer. Seward becomes more disturbed, while the gallows is being prepared for his execution. Pastor Mike kidnaps Linden. Holder and the police must listen to Linden/Pastor Mike's conversation via her two-way radio, which she has activated unbeknownst to Pastor Mike. Seward panics as his execution is just two days away. Bullet roams the streets, looking for Lyric, and learns about Angie Gower. Linden and Holder seek out Joe Mills after he attacks Danette. Their pursuit proves costly to everyone. With Seward's execution scheduled the next day, he desperately accepts Dale Shannon's suggestion to pray, only to learn his cellblock mate's true nature. Twitch foregoes his future modeling plans to settle down with Lyric. Linden spends Seward's remaining twelve hours with him. He allows his son Adrian to visit, but Becker denies entry. Seward admits to Linden that he arrived home after his wife's death, but quickly left. His execution occurs, despite Linden's belief that he is innocent of his wife's murder and her efforts to obtain a stay. Holder and Linden are called to another case, which has similarities to the recently solved one. Holder suspects a cop has committed all the murders. They find clues which cause Linden to deduce that Adrian Seward was the target in 2009 and not his mother. Adrian is followed home by a car whose driver he recognizes. Frantic to find Adrian, Holder and Linden voice their suspicions about Reddick to Skinner. Linden later sees a ring from the missing Kallie on Skinner's daughter's finger. She knows Skinner is the killer and must ride with him to find Adrian. Holder must race to save Linden when Adrian is found safe.

== Cast ==
=== Main ===
- Mireille Enos as Sarah Linden, the lead homicide detective
- Joel Kinnaman as Stephen Holder, a homicide detective
- Elias Koteas as James Skinner, Linden's former partner and current leader of the Seattle Police Department's Special Investigations Unit
- Hugh Dillon as Francis Becker, a death row prison guard with many personal issues
- Amy Seimetz as Danette Leeds, a single mother of a missing girl
- Bex Taylor-Klaus as Rachel “Bullet” Olmstead, a tough, tomboyish lesbian who is an informant for Linden and Holder
- Julia Sarah Stone as Lyric, a street kid who is in love with Twitch who becomes close with Pastor Mike
- Max Fowler as Twitch, a streetwise teenaged boy who is addicted to heroin
- Peter Sarsgaard as Ray Seward, an inmate on death row for the murder of his wife, a crime of which he may be innocent

=== Recurring ===
- Aaron Douglas as Evan Henderson, a death row prison guard with a young family
- Gregg Henry as Carl Reddick, Holder's seasoned new partner
- Ryan Robbins as Joe Mills, Danette's boyfriend a primary suspect in the case
- Ben Cotton as Pastor Mike, a pastor who runs Beacon Home, a homeless teen shelter
- Nicholas Lea as Dale Daniel Shannon, a death row inmate who is very religious
- Jewel Staite as Caroline Swift, Holder's girlfriend and a District Attorney
- James "Little JJ" Lewis as Alton, a death row prison inmate who hangs himself in prison after gaining forgiveness from his siblings after having killed his own parents
- Cate Sproule as Kallie Leeds, a young runaway girl who goes missing
- Andrew Jenkins as Cody, Sarah's co-worker from the ferry
- Laine MacNeil as Angie Gower, the only surviving witness
- Benjamin Charles Watson as Rayna, a transgender teen
- Grace Zabriskie as Mama Dips, the 7 Star Motel's owner
- Katherine Evans as Bethany Skinner, James Skinner's daughter
- Annie Corley as Regi Darnell, Sarah's social worker and mother figure
- Liam James as Jack Linden, Sarah's son

== Production and development ==
AMC announced on July 27, 2012 that the series would not be renewed for a third season. However, Fox Television Studios announced that they were attempting to shop the show to other networks. In August 2012, it was revealed that Fox Television Studios was in talks with both DirecTV and Netflix in an attempt to revive the series. In November 2012, it was confirmed that Fox Television Studios were in final negotiations with Netflix in order to continue the series for a third season. AMC, who had originally canceled the show, was also included in part of the deal. The deal in question would gain the network the privilege of airing the new episodes before they are hosted by Netflix in return for sharing any associated production costs with Netflix. Variety reported on November 30, 2012 that the show would be returning to AMC, planning for a May 2013 debut, with production set to begin months before that. Series developer Veena Sud returned as showrunner and returning writers include executive producers Dawn Prestwich and Nicole Yorkin. On December 12, 2012, it was confirmed that cast members Billy Campbell, Michelle Forbes and Brent Sexton would not return for the third season.

On January 15, 2013, AMC and Fox Television Studios announced that the series had been renewed for a 12 episode third season. Production started on February 25, 2013 in Vancouver, British Columbia, Canada and ended on June 25, 2013.

In March 2013, Netflix closed negotiations with Fox Television Studios with a deal to be the exclusive subscription service for the series' third season. In the U.S., Netflix will stream the season approximately three months after its finale. Episodes were made available a day after the U.S. TV broadcast by Netflix UK and Ireland.

In a May 2013 interview, Sud stated her inspiration for the third season came from Streetwise (1988), Mary Ellen Mark's book of photographs about teenaged runaways in Seattle. Sud also stated she was "very fascinated" with Gary Ridgway, the serial killer of numerous females near Seattle and Tacoma, Washington in the 1980s and 1990s. In a separate interview, Sud said Peter Sarsgaard's character, Ray Seward, is inspired by Werner Herzog's documentary Into the Abyss (2011), about two men convicted of committing three murders in Texas.

== Episodes ==
No. overall	No. in season	Title	Directed by	Written by	Original release date	Prod. code	US viewers (millions)
27	1	"The Jungle"	Ed Bianchi	Veena Sud	June 2, 2013	BDH301/S301	1.76
Detective Holder and new partner Carl Reddick investigate a teenage girl's death, whose murder has similarities to a previous case of Sarah Linden's; Linden is now a Transit Authority employee. Meanwhile, Ray Seward, who had been convicted in that case, is sent to death row. In the city, teenage runaways must find ways to survive, while a killer cruises the streets.
28	2	"That You Fear the Most"	Lodge Kerrigan	Dan Nowak	June 2, 2013	BDH302/S302	1.76
Holder and Reddick continue the investigation and enter the world of the runaways, one of whom is now missing. Meanwhile, death row inmate Seward continues to impose his will on the prison and the detectives who arrested him, James Skinner and Linden.
29	3	"Seventeen"	Kari Skogland	Eliza Clark	June 9, 2013	BDH303/S303	1.47
Skinner creates a task force after Linden, led to a site by a drawing, discovers 17 dead bodies in a pond. Bullet points Holder and Reddick to a new suspect. Linden speaks with Adrian (Rowan Longworth), the drawing's creator. Seward is slipped a hidden razor blade in prison.
30	4	"Head Shots"	Michael Rymer	Dawn Prestwich & Nicole Yorkin	June 16, 2013	BDH304/S304	1.36
The 7 Stars Motel and its proprietor are investigated as the site for the DVD production. Holder attempts to mediate between Linden and Reddick. Bullet helps Twitch when he gets into trouble. Seward rejects his medicine, and the guards must persuade him to take it.
31	5	"Scared and Running"	Dan Attias	Coleman Herbert	June 23, 2013	BDH305/S305	1.67
Holder and Linden learn a potential victim has escaped the killer. Bullet assists them to retrace the victim's steps, while also hoping to find Kallie, her missing friend. Kallie's mother, Danette, grows worried and discovers something about her boyfriend Joe. Seward gets a visit from his son's adoptive mother.
32	6	"Eminent Domain"	Keith Gordon	David Wiener	June 30, 2013	BDH306/S306	1.37
Holder and Linden revisit the Seward case in hopes of finding a connection with the current one. Bullet takes Danette to Kallie's favorite hangouts. Seward asks to speak to his imprisoned father.
33	7	"Hope Kills"	Tricia Brock	Brett Conrad	July 7, 2013	BDH307/S307	1.62
Pastor Mike is revealed to not be who he claims to be. Bullet and Lyric get closer. Seward becomes more disturbed, while the gallows is being prepared for his execution.
34	8	"Try"	Lodge Kerrigan	Nic Sheff & Aaron Slavik	July 14, 2013	BDH308/S308	1.52
Pastor Mike kidnaps Linden. Holder and the police must listen to Linden/Pastor Mike's conversation via her two-way radio, which she has activated unbeknownst to Pastor Mike. Seward panics as his execution is just two days away. Bullet roams the streets, looking for Lyric, and learns about Angie Gower.
35	9	"Reckoning"	Jonathan Demme	Dan Nowak	July 21, 2013	BDH309/S309	1.35
Linden and Holder seek out Joe Mills after he attacks Danette. Their pursuit proves costly to everyone. With Seward's execution scheduled the next day, he desperately accepts Dale Shannon's suggestion to pray, only to learn his cellblock mate's true nature. Twitch foregoes his future modeling plans to settle down with Lyric.
36	10	"Six Minutes"	Nicole Kassell	Veena Sud	July 28, 2013	BDH310/S310	1.47
Linden spends Seward's remaining twelve hours with him. He allows his son Adrian to visit, but Becker denies entry. Seward admits to Linden that he arrived home after his wife's death, but quickly left. His execution occurs, despite Linden's belief that he is innocent of his wife's murder and her efforts to obtain a stay.
37	11	"From Up Here"	Phil Abraham	Eliza Clark	August 4, 2013	BDH311/S311	1.48
Holder and Linden are called to another case, which has similarities to the recently solved one. Holder suspects a cop has committed all the murders. They find clues which cause Linden to deduce that Adrian Seward was the target in 2009 and not his mother. Adrian is followed home by a car whose driver he recognizes.
38	12	"The Road to Hamelin"	Dan Attias	Dawn Prestwich & Nicole Yorkin	August 4, 2013	BDH312/S312	1.48
Frantic to find Adrian, Holder and Linden voice their suspicions about Reddick to Skinner. Linden later sees a ring from the missing Kallie on Skinner's daughter's finger. She knows Skinner is the killer and must ride with him to find Adrian. Holder must race to save Linden when Adrian is found safe.

== Reception ==
=== Reviews ===
Early reviews for the season were generally positive, scoring a 69 out of 100, based on 22 reviews from Metacritic. Linda Stasi of the New York Post gave the premiere high praise and focused on the runaways' stories, saying "These kids are so tough, so dirty and so helpless — yet somehow still hopeful — that it will break your heart. The fact that someone's out there killing them will get you involved." Newsday's Verne Gay spoke about the season as an art form, stating "Everything fans loved about it the first season is back. The rain, the gloom, the pervasive sense of doom... The colors, or lack of them — the ALMOST reds and greens, smudged by deep shades of gray and brown... You start to think this isn't a TV show so much as the palette of a seriously depressed artist." Alan Sepinwall of HitFix spoke of the premiere as "the closest thing to a fresh start the show is going to get" and added that "there are some promising developments here suggesting this could ultimately be a more rewarding viewing experience than The Killing 1.0." New York Magazine's Matt Zoller Seitz compared the series' seasons, saying "As was the case with the first two seasons of The Killing, this new one takes its sweet, sweet time getting going, and as it slowly gains momentum, it carries itself as if it's the greatest series in the history of American television, single-handedly reinventing the police procedural for the 21st century."

Some reviews were more negative. Brian Lowry of Variety stated: "Beyond the central duo's initially sparsely connected threads and the splendid addition of Peter Sarsgaard as Ray Seward ... much of the narrative meanders — so slow, bleak and dreary, it's difficult to muster much interest as to when (inevitably) it's all going to begin to intersect."

=== Accolades ===
Peter Sarsgaard received a nomination for Best Supporting Actor in a Drama Series for the 4th Critics' Choice Television Awards.

== Home media releases ==
The third season of The Killing was released on DVD on June 3, 2014, in region 1, exclusively through Amazon's CreateSpace manufacture-on-demand program. In regions 2 and B, it was released on October 27, 2014.
