= Eminent Domain (The Killing) =

- The Killing episode
- Episode no.: Season 3 Episode 6
- Directed by: Keith Gordon
- Written by: David Wiener
- Production code: BDH306/S306
- Original air date: June 30, 2013

Episode chronology
← Previous "Scared and Running"	Next → "Hope Kills"
- The Killing (season 3)

"Eminent Domain" is the 32nd episode of the American television drama series The Killing, which aired on June 30, 2013. The episode is written by David Wiener and is directed by Keith Gordon. In the episode, Detective Holder (Joel Kinnaman) and Sarah Linden (Mireille Enos) revisit the Seward case in hopes of finding a connection with the current one. Bullet (Bex Taylor-Klaus) takes Danette Leeds (Amy Seimetz) to Kallie's favorite hangouts. Seward (Peter Sarsgaard) asks to speak to his imprisoned father (Duncan Fraser).

== Plot ==
At the police station, Danette demands to see Linden, telling the desk sergeant that Joe Mills (Ryan Robbins) took her daughter. She causes a commotion and gets arrested. At the hospital, Linden and Holder question Angie Gower (Laine MacNeil), the victim found at the vet's office. Angie describes her encounter, adding that she saw his eyes in the rear view mirror but could not see his face. Linden shows her a photo lineup that includes Mills. She cannot identify any of them as her attacker and Linden is frustrated. In the hallway, Holder scolds Linden for pushing the girl too hard. He questions if Mills is the right suspect, after Angie's inability to identify Mills and the lack of evidence connecting Mills with Trisha Seward's murder. Linden argues that fear may have stopped Angie from identifying Mills. Reddick (Gregg Henry) arrives to tell Holder the vet tech didn't see the person who dropped Angie at the clinic. Linden goes to the station to speak with Danette. She tells Danette that Mills has already left the hotel. Danette reminisces about Kallie's childhood and begs Linden to find her.

That night at the prison, Seward hears Alton (James Lewis) tearing sheets in his cell to make a noose. At first, he tries to talk Alton out of committing suicide but can see that Alton has made up his mind. Alton asks Seward not to yell for the guards, and Seward complies, speaking a few encouraging words as Alton hangs himself from his cell window. Henderson (Aaron Douglas) arrives late to work and learns that Becker already left. The cell block has not been monitored. He finds Alton's body and immediately calls for medical assistance.

At the station, Linden and Holder update Skinner (Elias Koteas) on Gower and Mills. In Skinner's office, Adrian's foster parents (Paul McGillion and Ingrid Torrence) complain about Linden's visiting Adrian at the playground. They say he's now back to sleeping in the closet, a habit he had throughout his early childhood. In her car, Linden shows Holder photos and the apartment floor plan from the Seward file, which he realizes she's had all along. Since there's no closet in Adrian's bedroom, Linden realizes he may have slept in the closet in the room where Trisha was murdered. They break into the vacant Seward apartment and Linden lies down in the closet, where she discovers glow-in-the-dark stars on the ceiling. She peers through an air vent at the bottom of the closet door and is able to see Holder when he stands in the spot where Trisha was murdered. She concludes that if Adrian were sleeping in the closet that night, then he must have seen his mother's killer.

In Skinner's office, Linden tells him the new theory about Adrian and again points out similarities between Trisha Seward's murder and the other victims'. Skinner still isn't convinced there's a connection. She tells him the two of them are responsible for preventing Seward's execution, if he is innocent. He worries that she is getting "too close" to the case again and reminds her that it was hard for him when she fell apart during their initial investigation a few years ago. Still frustrated, she leaves after he instructs her to focus on finding Mills.

Henderson asks Seward why he didn't help Alton by calling for the guards. Seward states that he did "help" him. In a visitation room, Seward sits across from his imprisoned father, who is surprised his son wanted to meet with him. Seward explains that something changed his mind. His father tells him that he "called in a favor" to get the razor blade to his son, hoping he would attack Becker. He also takes credit for his son's toughness, saying he taught him some things. Seward scoffs at the skewed perception of their relationship and reminds him that he abandoned their family, leaving them practically starving. As Seward leaves, his father says he's proud of him for serving his sentence like a man. Seward replies that dying in a jumpsuit doesn't make him a man.

Danette approaches Bullet in an alley, asking if she knows where Kallie might be. Bullet takes her to the riverfront, a favorite spot of Kallie's. Danette reminisces about playing hide-and-seek with a younger Kallie, who would never hide. Bullet tells her Kallie will be okay. Bullet later finds Lyric (Julia Sarah Stone) alone in her hotel room, upset about Twitch. Lyric asks Bullet to keep her warm in bed, and they discuss Kallie. She tells Bullet that she notices her, and the two kiss.

Linden visits Seward to ask if he knows Mills. He says no. She mentions that Adrian possibly saw Trisha's killer—adding that she knows Ray didn't kill his wife—and tries to solicit his help in getting Adrian to discuss what he remembers. Seward rages at Linden for coming to this realization 3 years too late, with only 12 days before his execution.

Holder stares intently at the bulletin board of victims' photos. He believes the killer is on a crusade or mission, noting that the killer hunts girls who have lost their way. Linden adds that the killer is the "shepherd" and the victims are his "flock." Reddick tells them that Angie snuck out of the hospital. Skinner orders everyone to find their main witness that night. Linden proposes they check Beacon Home. She and Holder wait in Pastor Mike's office. Holder looks at a bulletin board filled with photos of Beacon Home kids. "Shepherd of his flock," he says. Pastor Mike (Ben Cotton) enters and apologizes for their wait. Linden and Holder exchange looks.

== Production ==
In a June 2013 interview, actress Amy Seimetz (Danette Leeds) spoke about her emotional scenes in the series: "Those scenes were so terrifying to me! When you're dealing with a character like her who doesn't trust the police, you realize this is sort of her last resort, the one place she doesn't really want to go but she has to go there. So when they're not listening to her, it's just a snapping point. For me personally, it's the same relationship I have with going to the hospital for the first time for a family member or someone close. It's terrifying and awful, and you're in there and you want to desperately grab the doctor or nurses and be like, 'Tell me what is going on!'"

== Reception ==
=== Critical reception ===
Peter Sarsgaard was named the "Performer of the Week" by TVLine for his performance in this episode.

=== Ratings ===
"Eminent Domain" was watched by 1.37 million viewers, a considerable drop from the previous episode, and received a 0.4 rating in the 18-49 demographic.
