= The Jungle (The Killing) =

- The Killing episode
- Episode no.: Season 3 Episode 1
- Directed by: Ed Bianchi
- Written by: Veena Sud
- Production code: BDH301/S301
- Original air date: June 2, 2013

Guest appearances
- Annie Corley as Regi Darnell; Liam James as Jack Linden

Episode chronology
← Previous "What I Know"	Next → "That You Fear the Most"
- The Killing (season 3)

"The Jungle" is the twenty-seventh episode of the American television drama series The Killing, which aired on June 2, 2013, as the third season's premiere. The episode is written by series developer Veena Sud and is directed by Ed Bianchi. In the episode, Detective Stephen Holder (Joel Kinnaman) and his new partner Carl Reddick (Gregg Henry) investigate a teenage girl's murder, which has similarities to a previous case of Sarah Linden (Mireille Enos). Meanwhile, Ray Seward (Peter Sarsgaard), who had been convicted in that case, is sent to death row.

== Plot ==
A teenage girl (Keira Jang) gets into the passenger seat of an unseen driver's car. Later, Detectives Stephen Holder and Carl Reddick arrive at an abandoned factory. The girl's dead body is found inside. Holder mentions that her head was almost cut clean off. Elsewhere, homeless teen Bullet (Bex Taylor-Klaus) finds her friend Kallie (Cate Sproule) on a bridge, seemingly preparing to jump, and convinces her to accompany Bullet to find a place to sleep. They end up at Beacon Home, a shelter for homeless youth. There, Kallie and Bullet joke about Bullet's crush on Lyric (Julia Sarah Stone), another homeless girl, only Lyric is dating Twitch (Max Fowler). Kallie tries to talk Bullet into telling Lyric that she has a crush on her. Bullet shows Kallie the beautiful large blue ring, that is obviously stolen, that she has plans to give to Lyric.

At the morgue, the coroner (Fred Keating) estimates the dead girl's age to be 16 or 17. He announces the cause of death multiple sharp force injuries across the neck region. He also notes vaginal bruising, a broken finger, and a spinal cord nicked by a serrated edge. Holder asks if he left a 'Calling Card', to which the coroner states that the killer must have used a condom. Reddick suggests they give the case to fellow detective Tim Jablonski (Phil Granger). They leave after the coroner wishes Holder luck on his sergeant's exam. Jablonski agrees to take the case, although Holder is reluctant. He still needs to sign some paperwork.

At a prison, the warden (Michael Kopsa) reads Ray Seward his death warrant for the murder of Seward's wife Trisha. Seward will be relocated to death row until his execution, which is supposed to occur in 30 days. Upon Seward's arrival, commanding officer Francis Becker briefs him on the rules as he is placed in his cell. Seward asks to see the prison chaplain (John R. Taylor), who later visits, and Seward lulls him into complacency before bashing the chaplain's head against the bars. A lawyer urges Seward to use his last appeal with the governor, but Seward asks for death by hanging.

Sarah Linden now lives in Vashon, Washington and works for the Vashon Island Transportation Authority. At home, she gets an envelope mailed from the Department of Corrections but does not open it. She kisses coworker and new boyfriend Cody (Andrew Jenkins) before they go upstairs.

Holder visits her at home. He says he and Reddick have solved seven consecutive cases, improving Holder's status in the police force, and he and Linden claim they've quit smoking. Holder then tells her about the new murder and ponders the similarities and possible connection to Linden's old case, noting the Seward case file is missing. Linden offers no help. When Holder departs, he leaves the new case file on her table.

In a neighborhood where street kids hang out, Holder asks Kallie and Bullet if they have heard about the dead girl. Bullet gets angry with him and he sets her straight before leaving. On Regi's boat, Linden toasts Regi (Annie Corley) and her fiancée Ellen. Linden's son Jack (Liam James) asks if Linden would consider moving to Chicago, where he lives with his father. She avoids the question.

The dead girl is identified as Ashley Kwon, and Holder meets with her parents to tell them she is dead. Kallie visits her mother, Danette (Amy Seimetz), to ask to stay the night. Danette refuses because a boyfriend is coming over.

Linden jogs through the forest, when a storm approaches. Taking shelter in a barn, she finds cow carcasses scattered around. One is still barely alive and suffering. At home, Linden sees Cody looking through Ashley Kwon's case file. He asks what it is, and she silently passes him, gets her gun and leaves. She returns to the barn and shoots the cow dead in a mercy killing.

At Beacon Home, Bullet attempts to give the ring to Lyric, but Twitch arrives and takes Lyric away. Bullet tosses the ring aside, and Kallie retrieves it for safekeeping. Pastor Mike (Ben Cotton), who runs Beacon Home, raffles off three empty beds, one of which Bullet wins. Bullet offers her bed to Kallie, who refuses, saying she can stay with her mother. At the morgue, Holder asks the coroner if Ashley had rings on her fingers. The coroner says no. Holder inspects Ashley's broken finger and compares it to a photo, provided by Ashley's parents, in which Ashley wears several rings. Linden searches her closet and finds the Seward case file. Kallie walks down a road at night, when a car stops and she gets into the passenger seat.

== Reception ==
=== Critical reception ===
"The Jungle" received positive reviews from most critics. Linda Stasi of the New York Post gave the premiere high praise and focused on the runaways' stories, saying: "These kids are so tough, so dirty and so helpless — yet somehow still hopeful — that it will break your heart. The fact that someone's out there killing them will get you involved." The A.V. Club's Phil Dyess-Nugent gave the episode an A− grade, stating, "The show continues to be both visually entrancing and rich in mood ... As a set-up for a murder thriller and 10-week tour of the lower depths, it's awfully compelling, though." Alan Sepinwall of HitFix spoke of the premiere as "the closest thing to a fresh start the show is going to get, and there are some promising developments here suggesting this could ultimately be a more rewarding viewing experience than The Killing 1.0."

=== Ratings ===
The season premiere was watched by 1.76 million viewers and received a 0.4 rating in the 18-49 demographic.
