= Seventeen (The Killing) =

- The Killing episode
- Episode no.: Season 3 Episode 3
- Directed by: Kari Skogland
- Written by: Eliza Clark
- Production code: BDH303/S303
- Original air date: June 9, 2013

Episode chronology
← Previous "That You Fear the Most"	Next → "Head Shots"
- The Killing (season 3)

"Seventeen" is the twenty-ninth episode of the American television drama series The Killing, which aired on June 9, 2013. The episode is written by Eliza Clark and is directed by Kari Skogland. In the episode, James Skinner (Elias Koteas) creates a task force after Sarah Linden (Mireille Enos) discovers 17 dead bodies in a pond. Bullet (Bex Taylor-Klaus) points Detectives Holder (Joel Kinnaman) and Reddick (Gregg Henry) to a new suspect. Ray Seward (Peter Sarsgaard) is slipped a hidden razor blade in prison.

== Plot ==
After Linden finds the pond containing decomposed bodies, Skinner debriefs a task force at the station: 17 bodies were found encased in biohazard bags, throats slashed or heads severed, all female teenagers. Ashley Kwon is confirmed as having likely been killed by the same person. Skinner presumes the killer may hold victims for several days before killing them. Holder mentions teenager Kallie Leeds (Cate Sproule) has recently gone missing. In Skinner's office, Linden suggests a connection to the Trisha Seward case. Skinner gives Linden a badge, welcoming her back, but is hesitant about re-opening the Seward case. In prison, Seward showers next to Alton (James Lewis), who asks about an "A" tattoo on Seward's chest. Becker (Hugh Dillon) says it's for Adrian (Rowan Longworth), Seward's son. Seward finds a razor blade planted in his soap and hides it inside his mouth.

Lyric (Julia Sarah Stone) services cab driver Joe Mills (Ryan Robbins), who mentions the news about the dead bodies and urges her to be careful. On a stakeout, Reddick and Holder question the driver of an arriving car, as well as the teenage girl with him. The girl doesn't know Kallie but suggests they look for Bullet on an overpass. They find Bullet there, and Holder tells her they're looking for Kallie. Bullet says she heard a woman crying at Goldie's apartment but warns that Goldie (Brendan Fletcher) has a big knife. After busting into Goldie's apartment, Holder and Reddick find a television playing pornography showing a girl crying. Goldie tries to sneak out behind them, but Holder tackles him. At the station, Goldie admits to distributing child pornography and demands a lawyer when asked about Kallie.

Skinner tells Linden that Goldie's knife does not match the murder weapon used on Kwon and the 17 dead girls. As she leaves, Linden warns Skinner that his wife knows about their past affair. In the hallway, Linden admits to Holder a possible connection between Trisha Seward and the other murders; Trisha's finger was broken and missing a ring, just like Kwon's. At a school playground, Linden introduces herself to Adrian and asks if he remembers her from working on the Seward case. She asks why he added a factory to his drawing. He asks to see his dad and she agrees to look into it. Bullet finds Holder and Reddick staking out Goldie's apartment, and demands to know why Goldie wasn't locked up. Holder asks if Goldie did something to her, but she avoids answering. Later, Goldie spots the detectives on their stakeout.

The coroner (Fred Keating) estimates the bodies were in the pond for three to five years; all were killed within a six-month period. Linden asks if any bodies had broken fingers. He confirms some had broken, even severed fingers. Seward tries to bait Becker by saying he tore out Becker's cousin's eye at Cedar Creek prison. As Becker approaches, Seward readies the blade found in the soap. However, Becker is called away at the last second. That night, Seward slashes at his "A" tattoo and swallows the razor blade. Finding Seward bleeding on the floor, Henderson calls a Code Blue and guards rush to help Seward.

At the overpass, Bullet suggests Lyric stop hustling for a while and offers to help with money. Twitch (Max Fowler) and Rayna (Benjamin Charles Watson) arrive and propose visiting the crime scene. Later, the four of them observe the pond where the bodies were found. Bullet takes Lyric's hand. At the station, officers screen Goldie's porn videos to try and match any of the girls to the bodies from the pond. A cop brings a DVD to the attention of Holder and Linden, who watch the DVD and hear a male voice ask Kallie to remove her shirt.

== Reception ==
=== Ratings ===
"Seventeen" was watched by 1.47 million viewers and received a 0.4 rating in the 18-49 demographic.

=== Critical reception ===
Phil Dyess-Nugent of The A.V. Club gave the episode a B grade, stating, "Three hours into a 10-hour season, The Killing shows no signs of either loosening its grip on the audience's attention or lightening up. The show has staked out its territory and committed to it."
