= Scared and Running =

- The Killing episode
- Episode no.: Season 3 Episode 5
- Directed by: Dan Attias
- Written by: Coleman Herbert
- Production code: BDH305/S305
- Original air date: June 23, 2013

Episode chronology
← Previous "Head Shots"	Next → "Eminent Domain"
- The Killing (season 3)

"Scared and Running" is the thirty-first episode of the American television drama series The Killing, which aired on June 23, 2013. The episode is written by Coleman Herbert and is directed by Dan Attias. In the episode, Detective Holder (Joel Kinnaman) and Sarah Linden (Mireille Enos) learn a potential victim has escaped the killer. Bullet (Bex Taylor-Klaus) assists them to retrace the victim's steps, while also hoping to find Kallie, her missing friend. Kallie's mother, Danette (Amy Seimetz), grows worried and discovers something about her boyfriend Joe (Ryan Robbins). Seward (Peter Sarsgaard) gets a visit from his son's adoptive mother.

== Plot ==
A badly injured and bleeding girl (Laine MacNeil) runs into the middle of a road and gets struck by a car. She flees before the driver (Harrison MacDonald) gets out to help her. The driver then sees a man's silhouette standing in front of his headlights.

The next morning, Danette Leeds (Amy Seimetz) awakens to find that she has missed a call from daughter Kallie. Danette's boyfriend Joe Mills (Ryan Robbins) returns to the trailer after having been gone for much of the night. Danette voices her concern about Kallie. He dismisses himself and gets ready for work. Holder and Linden visit Danette after Mama Dips (Grace Zabriskie) reveals Mills is her son, and she called him at Danette's trailer from jail. Linden tells Danette that Mills made the porn video of Kallie. Danette insists Mills never looked at Kallie in a sexual way. She also mentions Kallie tried to call her the previous night. Skinner calls Holder with news that someone may have spotted Mills.

At the scene of the car accident, Skinner tells Linden and Holder the girl had red hair and was badly injured. The driver says a man pursued the girl through the forest. Linden traces the girl's original path to find a red biohazard bag hanging on a tree. Back in the car, Linden and Holder interpret the empty biohazard bag as a sign the girl is still alive. They begin to canvas the area and the city looking for her.

In prison, Alton rehearses the speech he plans to give to the family of his victims. When inmate Dale (Nicholas Lea) says God has already forgiven them all, Seward says he's not asking for forgiveness. Elsewhere, Becker (Hugh Dillon) requests six volunteer guards to assist with Seward's execution. Henderson (Aaron Douglas) does not sign up.

Linden and Holder visit Beacon Home. Pastor Mike (Ben Cotton) suggests they check one of the city's three remaining 24-hour clinics. Outside, Bullet arrives and asks what the gameplan is. Holder says they're going to look for Kallie at the clinics. Bullet says she has a better idea and gets into their car. She directs them to an overpass where Kallie sometimes sleeps when she can't find a bed elsewhere. Holder swaps his suit for a hoodie and talks to a gang of punks loitering nearby. One punk (Nelson Leis) heard crying near the river the previous night. Across the river, Holder notices some large drainage pipes. He, Linden, and Bullet drive to the pipes and find blood stains inside one of them. Holder hints Kallie may be dead and Bullet gut-punches him for giving up. He invites Linden to his apartment for food, but she declines.

Dale asks Seward if he loved his wife. Seward says he liked her wild side but she was neither mother nor wife material. Seward gets a visitor. Tess Clarke (Ingrid Torrence), Adrian's foster mother, tells him she'd like to adopt Adrian and Adrian wants to visit. When she adds that Adrian has forgiven him, Seward laughs and calls for the guard.

Linden misses the ferry home and goes to Holder's apartment. His girlfriend, Caroline Swift (Jewel Staite), introduces herself. Caroline serves her food and gives Holder a cupcake, wishing him a Happy Valentine's Day. Holder makes up an unconvincing excuse for not having anything for her, then gets a work call and looks at Caroline for permission to go. She cautions them to be safe. In the car, Bullet tells them that a friend saw a man carry a bleeding girl into an alleyway by a nearby veterinarian's office.

Linden and Holder bust into that office. A man (Jeff Gladstone) emerges from a room with his hands raised, insisting he doesn't know who dropped off the girl. Linden finds a girl on an operating table—her throat covered with sutured cuts and her hand wrapped in gauze. Linden knows it's not Kallie. Outside, Bullet cries as she slowly accepts the fact that Kallie might be dead. Holder comforts her.

Alton returns to his cell after meeting the family of his victims. He reveals to Seward that the visitors were his brother and sister and that his victims were his parents. He says his siblings told him they've forgiven him. Danette slowly drives down the city streets looking for Kallie. She calls her daughter and leaves a voicemail. She later meets Mills in a motel room. As he showers, she calls Kallie again. Drawn by the sound of ringing close by, she discovers Kallie's phone inside Mills' bag. He exits the bathroom and stares at her.

== Reception ==
"Scared and Running" was watched by 1.67 million viewers, a considerable rise from the previous episode, and received a 0.6 rating in the 18-49 demographic, the highest since the season two episode "Ghosts of the Past".
