= Try (The Killing) =

- The Killing episode
- Episode no.: Season 3 Episode 8
- Directed by: Lodge Kerrigan
- Written by: Nic Sheff; Aaron Slavick
- Production code: BDH308/S308
- Original air date: July 14, 2013

Episode chronology
| ← Previous "Hope Kills" | Next → "Reckoning" |
- The Killing (season 3)

"Try" is the thirty-fourth episode of the American television drama series The Killing, which aired on July 14, 2013. The episode is written by Nic Sheff and Aaron Slavick; directed by Lodge Kerrigan. In the episode, Pastor Mike (Ben Cotton) kidnaps Sarah Linden (Mireille Enos). Stephen Holder (Joel Kinnaman) and the police must listen to the Linden/Pastor conversation via her two-way radio, which she has activated unbeknownst to Pastor Mike. Ray Seward (Peter Sarsgaard) panics as his execution is two days away. Bullet (Bex Taylor-Klaus) roams the streets looking for Lyric (Julia Sarah Stone) and learns about Angie Gower (Laine MacNeil).

== Plot ==
In Linden's car, Pastor Mike, holding a knife to her throat, takes her phone and gun then orders her to drive around. She secretly turns on her police radio and tries to talk him down.

At the police station, Bullet tells Holder that Lyric called and that Mike is taking Lyric to the woods where he killed the other girls. Holder relays the news to Skinner (Elias Koteas), who's reluctant to take action. When Holder vouches for his informant, Skinner pulls half the officers searching trains for Mike and redirects them to the woods around the pond. Holder hears Linden's voice over an open radio channel and realizes she's being held hostage. Skinner redirects all resources to find Linden's car. All officers in the room listen intently as Linden talks to Pastor Mike.

Linden tells Mike that she understands his work because she grew up in foster care. He accuses her of trying to humanize herself so that he won't kill her, adding that it won't work. He then opens up about the kidnapping incident in Tempe, Arizona, saying he was wrongly accused and was just trying to help the girl through drug detoxification. Instead, he lost his ministry. He says no one believed him, that they all looked at him as Linden was looking at him at that moment. He directs her to a desolate parking garage, where the radio cuts out. He sits in silence, gun at the ready, and she urges him to tell the police about the girl in Tempe. She then confides about her strained relationship with son Jack. He softens a bit then asks her to take him to the waterfront.

Back at the station, Linden's voice fades back into the open radio channel. Holder hears her tell Mike about a friend's moment of despair on a nearby bridge. Catching her reference to his own breakdown, Holder realizes Linden is describing Biltmore Pier. He and a team of cops rush out of the station.

Mike admits that he dropped Angie off at the veterinarian. Taking her to a hospital would have landed her back in the foster system. He then spots Linden's police radio and orders her to pull over. He marches her at gunpoint to the edge of a pier, but ultimately drops to his knees and tosses the gun into the water. As he prays for forgiveness, the police arrive with their guns drawn. She shields him, yelling that he is unarmed. He is taken into custody unharmed.

In prison, Ray Seward's lawyer (John Shaw) tells him that he was unable to reach Linden. Seward asks to change his execution method to lethal injection, but is told that it's too late to change his fate. While being led back to his cell, Seward suffers a panic attack. In a rare moment of compassion, Francis Becker (Hugh Dillon) calms him.

At the station, Skinner tells Holder that Mike isn't the killer—he was in Mexico City for the period that the 17 murders took place. Skinner adds that Lyric is not "missing." Patrol just picked her up on the street. Furious, Holder finds Bullet out in the hallway and screams at her for misleading him and endangering Linden. He threatens to put her back in the foster system and kicks her out of the station.

At home, Linden watches Skinner on television as he tells reporters that Mike is no longer a suspect. Holder visits with some Chinese take-out. She recounts her experience with Mike to him. He notices Trisha Seward's case file, and she remarks that Ray Seward will be executed in two days.

Bullet finds Lyric hustling on the street and asks what happened to her the night before. Lyric yells at her for telling the cops she was missing, then informs her that she isn't a lesbian and is back with Twitch. Heart broken, Bullet buys drugs from Poochie (Bryce Hodgson), who tells her he just sold drugs to a girl who had her finger chopped off and warns Bullet to be careful.

Becker's wife, Annie (Sonya Salomaa) stops Evan Henderson (Aaron Douglas) in the prison waiting room and tells him Becker hasn't been home in a couple of days. She asks for consolation but Henderson, seeing her son (Colin MacKechnie) sitting nearby, excuses himself and leaves.

Bullet tracks down Angie, who's about to leave town on a bus. Bullet pushes her to reveal her kidnapper's identity. When Angie refuses, Bullet tries to bribe her with the drugs she bought. Bullet stops at a diner and leaves a voice-mail for Holder, pleading with him to call her back. She apologizes for the Lyric incident and says she knows who the killer is.

Still at Linden's house, Holder ignores the calls from Bullet. As they pore over Seward's case file, Linden and Holder remark that Seward really loves his son, judging from family photos of Adrian's first birthday. As he leaves Linden's house, Holder offers to take the Seward file and look it over, as Linden might have tunnel vision, figuratively speaking.

A more-desperate Seward calls Linden to beg for her help exonerating him. He hopes that Adrian has additional information and says he will get the foster parents to allow Linden to speak with Adrian again.

At the diner, Bullet continues calling Holder but cannot reach him. Outside, a car pulls up and its unseen driver watches Bullet through the diner window.

== Production ==
In a July 2013 interview, actor Ben Cotton (Pastor Mike) spoke about his character: "I did a lot [of preparation]. I didn't know what would be coming up in terms of the details, so I was reading the Bible. And there were some people who I looked at and was like, 'I'll sort of be like that' — but I don't know if I'm allowed to say who. I wasn't terribly familiar with the world of runaway teens, but I went to YouTube and typed in 'heroin' and 'documentaries' and watched enough hours that I started to have a response to it. I felt I had to manufacture the story with the girl in Tempe in my mind."

He also spoke of the inspirations for Pastor Mike: "There were people when I was young and in my teens who were trying to help kids, and they did help. There are people who without whom I don't know where I'd be today. And I think that's what Pastor Mike is ultimately trying to do. He's trying to save lives and be compassionate, in a system that doesn't really allow it. I have a friend who's a schoolteacher who was telling me how you're not allowed to hug the students anymore, and I think that's just unbelievable. I understand it, I get it, but I had teachers when I was growing up who were so kind and supportive. It was wonderful."

== Reception ==
=== Critical reception ===
Sean McKenna of TVFanatic stated: "You can certainly add 'Try' to the list of good episode on this roller coaster ride of cops, killers and the heightened drama surrounding the characters involved. I really can't get over how well done this return season of The Killing has been crafted and executed. If it can deliver a solid ending after all this rising tension and drama, not only will it be the best of the seasons, but it'll have me craving and clamoring for season four."

=== Ratings ===
"Try" was watched by 1.52 million total viewers, and received a 0.4 rating in the 18-49 ages demographic, marking slight drops from the previous episode.
