= Hope Kills =

- The Killing episode
- Episode no.: Season 3 Episode 7
- Directed by: Tricia Brock
- Written by: Brett Conrad
- Production code: BDH307/S307
- Original air date: July 7, 2013

Episode chronology
← Previous "Eminent Domain"	Next → "Try"
- The Killing (season 3)

"Hope Kills" is the thirty-third episode of the American television drama series The Killing, which aired on July 7, 2013. The episode is written by Brett Conrad and is directed by Tricia Brock. In the episode, Detective Holder (Joel Kinnaman) and Sarah Linden (Mireille Enos) learn Pastor Mike (Ben Cotton) is not who he claims to be. Bullet (Bex Taylor-Klaus) and Lyric (Julia Sarah Stone) get closer. Seward (Peter Sarsgaard) becomes more disturbed, while the gallows is being prepared for his execution.

== Plot ==
At Beacon Home, Pastor Mike tells Linden and Holder that Angie Gower didn't enter the shelter the night she was found. At Linden's request, the pastor hands over photos of girls who stayed at the shelter three years ago. Out in the hallway, Rayna (Benjamin Charles Watson) eavesdrops. Twitch (Max Fowler) finds Lyric and Bullet in bed together at the abandoned hotel. Lyric tries to explain, but Twitch brags that he was with an older woman all day. An angry Lyric leaves with Bullet.

At the station, Linden is unable to find a criminal record for Pastor Mike. Holder remains suspicious, pointing out that nearly all of the 17 victims found in the pond passed through Beacon Home. When Linden gets home, Cody (Andrew Jenkins) is waiting for her. He wants to talk about their relationship and her recent whereabouts. She tells him she was trying to be something she wasn't with him, then asks him to leave. In The Jungle, Holder asks Bullet about Pastor Mike. She defends him, saying Pastor Mike is the only guy in Seattle who's not a pedophile.

On death row, Seward speculates that Becker (Hugh Dillon) left work early the night of Alton's suicide due to problems with his wife. Becker taunts Seward by pointing out that the gallows is under construction. In the locker room, Becker tells Henderson (Aaron Douglas) that he left work early to look for his wife, who he found at a bar with another man. He adds that his son, and even the convicts, all know about his wife's adultery.

Danette (Amy Seimetz) visits Beacon Home. Pastor Mike tells her Kallie isn't there, then reassures her that Kallie is a survivor. Outside, Danette finds a menu from a pizzeria with "He's lying" written on it on her windshield. At the police station, she tells Linden that she visited Pastor Mike and shows her the pizzeria menu left on her windshield. Linden and Holder visit the pizzeria. As Holder orders a slice, they notice a watchful Rayna, who says she saw Angie bleeding in the alleyway next to Beacon Home the night of the attack. Rayna called Pastor Mike, who soon arrived in his car. When the Pastor pulled up, Angie ran away and Pastor Mike chased her. He later returned without her, but with blood all over his shirt.

Lyric tells Bullet about some government-sponsored apartments that Pastor Mike mentioned. Bullet tells Lyric that she loves her and promises she'll find a place for them to sleep that night. At Beacon Home, Bullet begs Pastor Mike to let her and Lyric stay overnight. The Pastor says all the beds are taken, but agrees to help them find a place to stay. Bullet mentions the police were making inquiries about the Pastor.

In the prison infirmary, Henderson weighs Seward to determine how heavy the counterweight needs to be for the hanging. Henderson senses Seward's growing fear about his execution. Seward later demands a phone call to his lawyer. Becker says it's too late to change the execution method. Seward trashes his cell and later grows distraught over his choice for method of execution. Cellmate Dale (Nicholas Lea) tells him to find peace in salvation. Meanwhile, Becker sneaks his son into the gallows room and brags to him that he'll be the one who gets to put the noose around Seward's neck.

At the station, Skinner approves a background check on Pastor Mike but refuses to grant a search warrant for his car due to insufficient evidence. Linden and Holder stake out Beacon Home to watch Pastor Mike. Holder takes a phone call and learns the Pastor has been using a fake ID. At Pastor Mike's house, Linden and Holder interrogate the Pastor after seeing that his car is a rental. As they leave, Holder asks dispatch to run a police database search for the biblical tattoo on Pastor Mike's arm. Inside Pastor Mike's house, Lyric thanks the Pastor for letting her stay the night. She says Bullet will arrive later.

Skinner says the tattoo search revealed that the pastor's real name is Mark Elwood, and that he was charged with kidnapping a 16-year-old girl in Tempe, Arizona six years ago. Charges were dropped when the girl later overdosed, but Elwood lost his Tempe ministry in the process. In his kitchen, Pastor Mike tells Lyric that he knows what it's like to have nowhere to go. Growing uncomfortable, Lyric tells him Bullet should be arriving any minute. A police team later busts into Pastor Mike's house but finds it empty. An officer informs Linden and Holder that the Pastor is not at Beacon Home, either. At the station, Danette meets Aubrey (Chilton Crane), a woman whose daughter has been missing for years. Danette later stares at the photos of the 17 victims on the bulletin board.

In Skinner's office, Linden says they found no weapon or trophies at Pastor Mike's house. Skinner tells Linden there's still no connection between Trisha Seward and the 17 victims, adding that Trisha was killed after the 17 were. Linden maintains Seward's innocence. Skinner tells Linden he believes her. A phone call interrupts them: Pastor Mike's car has been found. Police surround the Pastor's car at a train station. Holder sees blood on the back seat. Skinner orders a search of all outgoing trains. Linden gets in her car. Pastor Mike, sitting in the back seat, holds a knife to her throat, and orders her to drive.

== Production ==
In a July 2013 interview, actor Aaron Douglas (Gabe Henderson) spoke about his mindset and the capital punishment storyline: "In Canada, we don't have the death penalty. Even though we're making believe, Peter [Sarsgaard] is such a phenomenal actor that you really just have this moment of actually believing this guy is going through this. I could not imagine being the guy being walked to the gallows, or even the guy taking somebody by the arm and having to walk him there. No matter how heinous the crime that is committed, it's still the most intimate and horrifying thing you're going to do to somebody. The lethal injection is one thing, but it's the lead up — the weeks and months, and then standing there waiting for it to happen — that is so incredibly profound. I think when people watch the rest of this season, they're not going to be able to help being challenged, one way or the other, about whether capital punishment is a good thing or a bad thing."

== Ratings ==
"Hope Kills" was watched by 1.62 million viewers, the season's fourth best outing, and received a 0.5 rating in the 18-49 demographic.
