= John Franklin Bardin =

American writer (1916–1981)

- Born: November 30, 1916; Cincinnati, Ohio, United States
- Died: July 9, 1981 (aged 64); Beth Israel Medical Center; Manhattan, New York City
- Occupations: Advertising executive; editor; novelist
- Writing career
- Period: 1946–1978
- Genre: Crime fiction
- Website: www.johnfranklinbardin.com

John Franklin Bardin (November 30, 1916 – July 9, 1981) was an American crime writer, best known for the three novels he wrote between 1946 and 1948.

== Biography ==
Bardin was born in Cincinnati, Ohio, where his father was a well-to-do coal merchant and his mother an office worker. Nearly all of his immediate family died of various illnesses; with the exception of an elder sister dying of septicaemia, and his father succumbing to a coronary a year later, leaving little money. Bardin, who by then had graduated from Walnut Hills High School, was studying engineering at the University of Cincinnati, and had to leave in his first year in order to work full-time as a ticket-taker and bouncer at a roller-skating rink, and later as a night clerk at a bookstore, where he would educate himself by reading. "Mother had become a paranoid schizophrenic by then," Bardin said. "It was on visits to her that I first had an insight into the 'going home' hallucinations" that would later form the core of his third novel, Devil Take the Blue-Tail Fly. Other jobs were in Cincinnati and New York City, where he moved before turning 30, including working as a bench hand in a valve foundry; in the advertising department of a bank, in the production department of an advertising agency; and doing freelance market research for Barron Collier.

In New York, he began working for the ad agency Edwin Bird Wilson, Inc. in 1944, and from 1946 to 1948, completed the three novels for which he would be best known: The Deadly Percheron, The Last of Philip Banter, and Devil Take the Blue-Tail Fly, published over the course of 18 months, though that last was not published in the United States until the 1960s. Bardin would eventually write 10 novels over the course of his lifetime. His magazine articles include "The Disadvantages of Respectability", a review of the book Father of the Man: How Your Child Gets His Personality, by W. Allison Davis and Robert J. Havighurst, in The Nation, May 3, 1947.

After gradually rising to become vice president and director of Edwin Bird Wilson, Bardin left that agency in 1963. Two years earlier, he had begun teaching creative writing and advertising at the New School for Social Research, which he would continue to do through 1966. That year he worked as associate publicity director for the United Negro College Fund, and from 1967 to 1968, he wrote for the United Jewish Appeal of Greater New York. Turning to magazines, he then served as an editor at Coronet through 1972.

For the next two years at least, Bardin lived in Chicago, Illinois, where he served as managing editor of the American Medical Association magazine Today's Health through 1973; and through 1974 originated, and served as managing editor of, two American Bar Association Press magazines, Learning and the Law and Barrister. While his official site states he returned to New York in 1974, one source places him in Chicago still in 1978.

He resided in New York City's East Village. He died on July 9, 1981, at Beth Israel Medical Center in Manhattan, New York City. He was survived by his second wife, Phyllida.

== Legacy ==
As of at least 2010, Bardin's copyrights are held by Franklin C. Bardin and Judith A. Bardin, a.k.a. Judith Aycock, his children from his first marriage.

== Novels ==
In 1946, Bardin entered a period of intense creativity during which he wrote three crime novels that were relatively unsuccessful at first, one of them not even being published in America until the late 1960s, but which have since become well-regarded cult novels. He went on to write four more novels under the pen names Gregory Tree or Douglas Ashe; the writer Julian Symons, in his introduction to an omnibus collection of Bardin's first three works, called those later novels "slick, readable, unadventurous crime stories". Under his own name, Bardin also wrote three more novels, the first two of which Symons called, respectively, "an interesting but unsuccessful experiment" and "disastrously sentimental".

His best-regarded works, The Deadly Percheron, The Last of Philip Banter and Devil Take the Blue-Tail Fly experienced renewed interest in the 1970s when they were discovered by British readers. As Symons said of their reemergence:

Denis Healey was the guest of honour at a Crime Writers' Association dinner a few years ago, one of those years when he was no more than a shadow Minister, and so had time for criminal frivolity. In the course of his speech Mr. Healey showed a considerable, almost a dazzling, knowledge of crime fiction. It was an impressive performance, one nearly too much for some of the audience. People who write crime stories are often not great readers of them, feeling perhaps that anything they read will be inferior to what they have written. And when, near the end of his peroration, Mr. Healey picked out for special praise the crime novels of John Franklin Bardin, they looked at each other in astonishment. Who was John Franklin Bardin? One is safe in saying than no more than a dozen of the hundred and fifty people at dinner than night had ever heard of him.

Symons, who compiled the omnibus, had difficulty tracking down information on Bardin. He was unable to find any American critic who had heard of him and even his original publishers and agents did not know how to contact him or even whether he was still alive. Symons wrote that Third Degree, the journal of Mystery Writers of America, found Bardin in Chicago, editing an American Bar Association magazine, and willing and eager to see his work republished.

The Deadly Percheron tells the story of a psychiatrist who encounters a patient with apparent delusions and a strange story to tell, but who does not otherwise exhibit signs of mental instability. His story turns out to have at least some connection to reality, drawing the psychiatrist into a complicated alternate identity that changes his life. The Last of Philip Banter sees a man receiving (or apparently writing) disturbing predictions about his life. The predictions partly become true, the effect of the predictions themselves being destructive and mind-altering.

Devil Take the Blue-Tail Fly, perhaps his most acclaimed work, is told largely through the perspective of the protagonist Ellen, a mental hospital patient who experiences psychological disintegration.

Bardin gave his literary influences as Graham Greene, Henry Green and Henry James.

In the film Mona Lisa one of the characters is reading The Deadly Percheron and makes several conversational references to it.

The Library of Congress' Rule Interpretations (October 2009), in its chapter "Uniform Titles", uses The John Franklin Bardin Omnibus as its example of an author's name as an integral part of a copyrighted book title.

== In other media ==
The Last of Philip Banter was adapted into a 1986 film produced, directed and cowritten by Hervé Hachuel and starring Scott Paulin, Irene Miracle, Gregg Henry, Kate Vernon and Tony Curtis.

== Bibliography ==
=== Novels ===
- The Deadly Percheron 1946 by Dodd, Mead in the United States. In England 1947 by Victor Gollancz. In paperback in the US & UK, 1976-1991 first as part of The John Franklin Bardin Omnibus and then in a separate edition. 1998 by Poisoned Pen Press. In Scotland, 2000 by Canongate Books, Ltd (Canongate Crime Classics). 2006 Millipede Press
- The Last of Philip Banter 1947 by Dodd, Mead in the United States. In England 1947 by Victor Gollancz. In paperback in the US & UK, 1976-1991 first as part of The John Franklin Bardin Omnibus and then in a separate edition.
- Devil Take the Blue-Tail Fly in England 1948 by Victor Gollancz. In the United States 1967 by Macfadden-Bartell (paperback). Again in paperback in the US & UK, 1976-1991 first as part of The John Franklin Bardin Omnibus and then in a separate edition. In Scotland, 2001, by Canongate Books, Ltd (Canongate Crime Classics).
- The Case Against Myself (Published under the pseudonym Gregory Tree) 1950 by Charles Scribner's Sons in the United States. 1951 by Bantam. In England, 1951 by Victor Gollancz.
- The Burning Glass 1950 by Charles Scribner's Sons in the United States. In England, by Victor Gollancz.
- The Case Against Butterfly (Published under the pseudonym Gregory Tree) 1951 by Charles Scribner's Sons in the United States.
- A Shroud For Grandmama (Published under the pseudonym Douglas Ashe and in England under the pseudonym Gregory Tree) 1951 by Charles Scribner's Sons in the United States. In England, 1952 by Victor Gollancz. In US, 1970 by Paperback Library (retitled The Longstreet Legacy).
- So Young To Die (Published under the pseudonym Gregory Tree) 1953 by Charles Scribner's Sons in the United States. In England, 1952 by Victor Gollancz. In the US, 1969 by Macfadden-Bartell (paperback).
- Christmas Comes but Once a Year 1954 by Charles Scribner's Sons in the United States. In England, 1954 by Peter Davies.
- Purloining Tiny 1978 by Harper and Row in the United States.

=== Critical studies and reviews of Bardin's work ===
- Snyder, Robert Lance (Spring 2026). "Discovering John Franklin Bardin". Clues : a journal of detection. 44 (1): 38–47.
