= The Last of Philip Banter =

1986 film based on John Franklin Bardin crime novel

- Theatrical-release one-sheet
- Directed by: Hervé Hachuel
- Written by: Hervé Hachuel and Alvaro de la Huerta (story)
- Screenplay by: Alvaro de la Huerta
- Based on: The Last of Philip Banter, a 1947 novel by John Franklin Bardin
- Produced by: Hervé Hachuel
- Starring: Scott Paulin; Irene Miracle; Gregg Henry; Kate Vernon; Tony Curtis.
- Cinematography: Ricardo Charra
- Edited by: Eduardo Biurrun
- Music by: Phil Marshall; songs by Gregg Henry
- Production company: Tesauro
- Distributed by: Cinevista
- Release date: 25 August 1986 (Palacio de la Música)
- Running time: 103 minutes
- Countries: Spain; Switzerland
- Language: English

The Last of Philip Banter is a 1986 English-language Spanish-Swiss drama based on the same-name novel by American writer John Franklin Bardin. Produced, directed and cowritten by Hervé Hachuel, it starred Scott Paulin, Irene Miracle, Gregg Henry, Kate Vernon and Tony Curtis.

== Plot ==
Heavy-drinking Philip Banter, an American working in Madrid, Spain, for his father-in-law's multinational corporation, finds himself awakening from blackouts. At his office, he finds typewritten manuscript pages, evidently written by him, that describe violent deeds. He and his wife, Elizabeth, have a strained relationship, one exacerbated by a visit from their Wall Street-broker friend Robert, who is attracted to Elizabeth, and Robert's female friend, whom Philip beds after driving her home. Elizabeth's father, Charles Foster, dislikes Philip intensely, countenancing him only for the sake of his daughter. With Charles' support, Elizabeth seeks to have the unstable Philip receive help from psychiatrist Dr. Monasterrio, but the doctor cannot have anyone committed to his psychiatric facility without their approval or indication they are a danger to themselves or others. At Elizabeth's request, Monasterrio attends a party at the Banters' home that night, in order to speak with Philip informally and try to convince him to check himself in voluntarily. At the party, Philip meets writer Brent, who strongly resembles the woman he had bedded but evidently is someone else. Unknown to him, Brent and Robert are part of the manipulative Charles' plan to gaslight Philip and have him committed, and to have Elizabeth turn to Robert, whom Charles considers a more suitable mate for her.

The unwary Elizabeth, unable to take the strained marriage any longer, meets Philip in a restaurant to tell him she is leaving him. An enraged Philip attempts to strangle her, and after another blackout finds himself at home, where Monasterrio and two aides tranquilize him and take him to the facility. Philip escapes, and after rushing to Robert's home to seek his friend's help, discovers Robert stalling him until the facility's aides can arrive to try to recapture him. Philip again escapes, and seeks help from Brent. Finding she, too, is part of the plot, he attacks her. Philip eventually obtains a recording of Charles describing his plot. Taunting Charles with the recording, Philip goes into a subway station, where Charles chases him as a concerned Elizabeth follows. On platforms separated by tracks, Philip plays the tape so that Elizabeth can hear. Charles falls into the tracks just as a train is coming and is killed.

== Main cast ==
- Scott Paulin as Philip Banter
- Irene Miracle as Elizabeth Banter
- Gregg Henry as Robert Prescott
- Kate Vernon as Brent Holliday
- Tony Curtis as Charles Foster
- José Luis Gómez as Doctor Monasterrio
- Patti Shepard as Alicia
- Fernando Telletxea as Enrique

Producer-director-cowriter Hervé Hachuel plays a customs officer, per the film's end credits.

== Production and release ==
Alternately released under the title Banter, the movie was shot on location in Madrid, Spain, and the studio facility Barajas, S.A. It was filmed in Kodak Eastmancolor. Clifford W. Lord Jr. and screenwriter Alvaro de la Huerta were the executive producers.

== Release ==
The film premiered at the Palacio de la Música on 25 August 1986.

Copyrighted 1986, it was released by distributor Cinevista in 1988. On home video, it was released on VHS by Republic Pictures Home Video in 1988 (ISBN 1-55526-483-2). The release includes trailers for filmmaker Jûzô Itami's Tampopo and The Funeral, and director John G. Thomas' Arizona Heat.

== Reception ==
The film has no reviews or rating at the film-critics aggregate site Rotten Tomatoes, and under neither name appears at the aggregate site Metacritic or at the film-revenue statistical site Box Office Mojo. In a latter-day essay, writer Imran Khan says the film's change of locale from New York City to "the glacial calm of Madrid ... defanged and rendered limp" the novel's story. Philip "flounders hopelessly in a scenic and foreign city, divorced from the self-reflexivity that the novel's text provides, with the New York City backdrop serving as a projection of human angst." Moreover, "Its updating of the story's original timeframe, from the '40's to an '80s yuppie world of power suits and starched preppy shirts, inhibits any sympathy the viewer might feel for these characters mired in their woes." The filmmaker, he says, "opts for an unusual fusion of American noir and European malaise, never committing fully to either."
