= Six Minutes =

Six Minutes may refer to:

- Six Minutes (The Killing), an episode of the American television drama series The Killing
- Six Minutes (podcast), a children's podcast
- Six Minutes, a song by Boy Kill Boy from the album Civilian
- Six Minutes, a song by LFO from the album Life Is Good
