= La portiera nuda =

1976 film by Luigi Cozzi

- Directed by: Luigi Cozzi
- Written by: Marino Onorati
- Produced by: Giorgio Bracardi
- Starring: Irene Miracle
- Cinematography: Roberto Girometti
- Edited by: Carlo Reali
- Music by: Manuel De Sica
- Release date: 1976
- Country: Italy
- Language: Italian

La portiera nuda (The Naked Doorwoman) is a 1976 Italian commedia sexy all'italiana directed by Luigi Cozzi. It stars Irene Miracle and Erika Blanc.

== Plot ==
A young woman working as a concierge/maid in an apartment building is accosted by various sex-minded weirdo tenants.

== Cast ==
- Irene Miracle as Gianna
- Erika Blanc as Annie Petré
- Giorgio Bracardi as Dr. Freudiano
- Mario Carotenuto as Producer De Grandis
- Francesca Romana Coluzzi as Miss Politoni
- Enzo Garinei as Accountant Battistoni
- Daniela Giordano as Annie's friend
- Raf Luca as Roberto Baldacci
- Tom Felleghy as Mr. Ponitoni

== Production ==
The film was produced by Italgemma.

== Release ==
The film was distributed in Italian cinemas by C.I.A. starting from 11 March 1976.

== Reception ==
While praising some inventive touches and appreciating the Bracardi and Carotenuto's characters, Italian critic Marco Giusti noted how "Cozzi fails to offer an original take on the commedia sexy or fully immerse himself in the genre".

== See also ==
- List of Italian films of 1976
