= Last Stop on the Night Train =

1975 film by Aldo Lado

- Italian film poster
- Italian: L'ultimo treno della notte
- Directed by: Aldo Lado
- Screenplay by: Aldo Lado; Renato Izzo
- Story by: Roberto Infascelli; Ettore Sanzò
- Produced by: Pino Buricchi; Paolo Infascelli
- Starring: Flavio Bucci; Macha Méril; Gianfranco De Grassi; Marina Berti; Franco Fabrizi; Enrico Maria Salerno
- Cinematography: Gabor Pogany
- Edited by: Alberto Galliti
- Music by: Ennio Morricone
- Production company: European Inc.
- Distributed by: Produzioni Atlas Consorziate (P.A.C.)
- Release date: 9 April 1975
- Running time: 94 minutes
- Country: Italy
- Language: Italian

Last Stop on the Night Train (Italian: L'ultimo treno della notte, also released in English-speaking countries as Night Train Murders and Late Night Trains) is a 1975 Italian rape-and-revenge horror film directed and co-written by Aldo Lado and starring Flavio Bucci, Macha Méril, Gianfranco de Grassi, Irene Miracle, Laura d'Angelo, Marina Berti, and Enrico Maria Salerno.

Based on the plots of Ingmar Bergman's The Virgin Spring (1960) and Wes Craven's The Last House on the Left (1972), the film follows two girls riding a train through Germany on Christmas Eve, who are brutalized by three criminals who eventually end up lodging in their parents' home.

It gained notoriety when it was banned in the UK as a video nasty in the 1980s. Other alternate release titles include The New House on The Left, Second House on The Left, and Don't Ride on Late Night Trains.

== Plot ==
Two young women, Margaret and Lisa, are set to take the overnight train from Munich to stay with Lisa's parents in Italy for Christmas. However, the train is full, and they are forced to sit in the corridor. Meanwhile, two petty criminals, Blackie and Curly, also board the train to escape from a pursuing policeman. They come across Margaret and Lisa, who help them hide from the ticket collector. Blackie then encounters an upper-class older woman whom he attempts to molest in the toilets, only for her to seduce him aggressively. As Curly gets into a fight, the girls become increasingly wary of the thugs' behaviour and go further down the train to escape them.

In Innsbruck, the train is stopped and searched following a tip-off that a bomb is on board. The girls call Lisa's parents to mention the delay, but cannot get through. In Italy, her parents are preparing for Christmas and hosting a dinner party for their friends. In Innsbruck, the girls board another train that will take them directly to Italy. The new train is old, run-down, and virtually empty. Finding a compartment in the last carriage, they settle down for their trip and begin to eat a packed lunch by candlelight.

As the train travels into the night, the girls discover that the thugs and the older woman are on board. The three soon force their way into the girls' compartment. Blackie and the woman then engage in lewd acts while taunting the girls. Curly beats Margaret into submission and then forces Lisa to masturbate him. The woman spots another passenger, a voyeur watching them through the compartment window. Grabbing the man, the thugs force him to rape Margaret, but are distracted by Lisa vomiting, and he escapes.

The woman encourages Curly to rape Lisa, but he cannot break her hymen. The woman holds down Lisa while encouraging Curly to cut her with his flick knife to help him. The woman grabs the knife and forces it deeper into Lisa, causing her to haemorrhage and die. Margaret escapes and locks herself in the toilet while the woman orders the thugs to bring her back; the woman initially thinks that Lisa is feigning death and slaps her corpse until realizing that she is deceased. Margaret climbs out the window and flings herself from the train, only to die in the fall. The men throw Lisa's body out the window, followed by their victims' luggage, stealing their tickets and other items.

Arriving at the station to meet the girls, Lisa's parents are alarmed when they do not arrive. The stationmaster says that their train has been delayed, so the couple elects to return home. While leaving, they come across the woman and the thugs; Giulio agrees to take the three to his house so he can treat an injury the woman sustained on her leg. Lisa's mother becomes suspicious of her houseguests when she spies Curly wearing a tie exactly like the one she was told Lisa had bought for her father as a Christmas present. Giulio eventually decides to take the trio back to town and fetch the car. While in the car, he hears a radio report naming his daughter as a body found near the train track.

Realizing that his houseguests are responsible, Giulio confronts the woman, who convinces him that the thugs killed the girls and threatened to do the same to her. Giulio leaves her with his wife before heading to find the others. He discovers Curly in his surgery room, injecting heroin; he grabs Curly and forces the needle deeper into his arm, overdosing him. He then beats Curly with furniture and surgical instruments.

Spying Blackie trying to flee, he grabs a shotgun and pursues him through the gardens. Curly crawls into the driveway and tries to grab the woman, only for her to kick him to death. Giulio wounds Blackie in the leg before shooting him at point-blank range. As the police arrive, the woman's fate remains uncertain.

== Cast ==
- Flavio Bucci as Blackie
- Macha Méril as Lady on the Train
- Gianfranco De Grassi as Curly
- Enrico Maria Salerno as Professor Giulio Stradi
- Marina Berti as Laura Stradi
- Irene Miracle as Margaret Hoffenbach
- Laura D'Angelo as Lisa Stradi
- Franco Fabrizi as Voyeur
- Daniele Dublino as Dinner Guest
- Gianni Di Benedetto as Forti
- Dalila Di Lazzaro as Nurse Pauline (uncredited)

== Critical reception ==
Adam Tyner of DVD Talk wrote, "Night Train Murders has a few redeemingly uncomfortable moments that make the numerous comparisons to The Last House on the Left seem deserved. Still, it suffers from so many flaws—poor pacing, an anemic screenplay, weak overdubbed dialogue, and a tendency to flinch during the sparse brutality—that I can't recommend the movie on its own merits with any great enthusiasm."

DVD Verdict said, "If Wes Craven's train leaves Connecticut traveling east at 25 mph and Alan Lado's train leaves a station in Verona traveling west at 35 mph, then can a cheap imitation of a film actually be better than the film it's ripping off? Well, in this case yes. While The Last House on the Left's success came largely from its grittiness, Lado proves that a professional sheen can be just as effective, and puts his film on the express track to success."

== Controversy ==
The film was rejected by the BBFC when submitted for cinema classification in the UK in 1976. It was banned as a video nasty in 1983, though it was acquitted and removed from the list in 1984. It did not get a full release until 2008 when it was finally passed uncut and distributed on DVD by Shameless Screen Entertainment.

== See also ==
- List of Italian films of 1975
