= Never Here =

- Film poster
- Directed by: Camille Thoman
- Written by: Camille Thoman
- Produced by: Julian Cautherley; Radium Cheung; Bronwyn Cornelius; Erika Hampson; Corey Moosa
- Starring: Mireille Enos; Goran Višnjić; Vincent Piazza; Nina Arianda; Sam Shepard
- Cinematography: Sebastian Winterø
- Edited by: Jon Berry; Walter Fasano
- Music by: James Lavino
- Production companies: Before the Door Pictures; Wonderbar Productions
- Distributed by: Vertical Entertainment
- Release date: June 18, 2017 (Los Angeles Film Festival)
- Running time: 110 minutes
- Country: United States
- Language: English

Never Here is an American thriller film directed and written by Camille Thoman. The film stars Mireille Enos. It premiered at the Los Angeles Film Festival in 2017 and was distributed by Vertical Entertainment. It marked the final film role for actor Sam Shepard.

== Plot ==
When a woman's secret lover is witness to a brutal assault from her apartment window, she pretends to be the key witness of the crime to keep their affair hidden.

== Cast ==
- Mireille Enos as Miranda Fall
- Sam Shepard as Paul Stark
- Goran Višnjić as S
- Vincent Piazza as Andy Williams
- Nina Arianda as Margeret Lockwood

== Production ==
On May 14, 2014, it was announced that Mireille Enos was cast in the leading role of the feature film debut for documentary director Camille Thoman. Sam Shepard and Goran Višnjić were later cast. Executive producers on the film included actor Zachary Quinto and Neal Dodson.
