= Six Minutes (The Killing) =

- The Killing episode
- Episode no.: Season 3 Episode 10
- Directed by: Nicole Kassell
- Written by: Veena Sud
- Production code: BDH310/S310
- Original air date: July 28, 2013

Episode chronology
← Previous "Reckoning"	Next → "From Up Here"
- The Killing (season 3)

"Six Minutes" is the thirty-sixth episode of the American television drama series The Killing, which aired on July 28, 2013. The episode is written by series creator Veena Sud and directed by Nicole Kassell. In the episode, Sarah Linden (Mireille Enos) spends Ray Seward's (Peter Sarsgaard) remaining twelve hours with him. He allows his son Adrian (Rowan Longworth) to visit, but Becker (Hugh Dillon) denies entry. Seward's execution occurs, despite Linden's belief that he is innocent of his wife's murder.

== Plot ==
Twelve hours before the execution, Seward's execution team conducts a run-through of the hanging. Linden arrives to ask Seward if he recognizes any of four unidentified rings that were recently recovered. He identifies a fake silver wedding band that he gave Trisha by noting a scratch inside the band. In the prison waiting room, she calls the state attorney general to request a stay of execution for Seward. She thinks more evidence could be in the Seward file and calls Holder (Joel Kinnaman) to ask him to bring it to the prison.

At Seward's cell, Becker tells him about the unclaimed bodies in the prison cemetery. He asks Seward who is claiming him, then informs Henderson (Aaron Douglas) he's on watch until the 6 p.m. execution. Adrian and his adoptive mother (Ingrid Torrence) join Linden at the prison. Becker summons Linden to see Seward. She tells Seward she's waiting for photos which show Trisha wearing the wedding ring. He asks about Adrian and Becker ends the visit.

Linden threatens to call Becker's captain and notes that D.O.C. policy grants Seward a right to speak with visitors for another five hours. She joins Seward again and he tells her he fears a slow death, to which she urges him to see his son. He proclaims himself a "monster" who beat his wife. She replies she's trying to save him to correct her own mistake.

She meets an intoxicated Holder in the waiting room. He gives her the Seward file and comments that the scratched ring is a long shot. While taking a smoke break in the prison courtyard, he sees Adrian, who comments on his intoxication. Inside, Linden tells Seward the A.G. will soon have a photo of Trisha wearing the identified ring, then again urges him to see his son. She speaks with the A.G., who considers a stay. Adrian apologizes to her for lying about Joe Mills. He didn't want his dad to get in trouble again, but adds that Ray is the man he saw in the apartment the night of the murder.

Holder returns from a beer run and discovers the prison cemetery. Still upset, he begins to throw beer cans at the anonymous tombstones. Inside, Seward laughs when Linden says the AG is considering a stay. Becoming angry, she asks him why he was in the apartment on the night of the murder, why he played her. She marches into the prison parking lot, where Holder accuses her of always running away from situations. She then gets a call from the AG. Seward's stay has been denied.

Back inside, she tells Seward the news and he thanks her for trying. He says he returned to the apartment because he wanted to take Adrian away and give him a better life. He then agrees to see his son. Adrian checks his appearance in the men's room mirror and Holder fixes Adrian's hair using liquid soap as styling gel. While waiting for Adrian, Seward mentions building a treehouse for him in the park. Out in the hall, Becker blocks Adrian and his mother at a gate, then informs Seward and Linden that visiting hours are officially over. Seward screams at the guards, as Linden tells him to look out his window.

She calls the district attorney to remedy the situation. Holder takes her phone, telling her it's over. The guards dress Seward for the hanging, then escort him to the gallows. En route, he stops to look out a window and sees Linden standing with Adrian just outside the prison fence. His son waves to him. Linden sits in the viewing gallery as the warden reads his death sentence. Seward is given a chance to make a final statement. He comments on Salisbury steak being ground beef and asks to get on with the execution. Becker falters when the time comes to place the hood over Seward's head and Henderson takes his place. The trapdoor opens, and Seward's body falls through. As he feared, his neck does not snap. Linden watches in horror as Seward slowly chokes to death.

== Production ==
In an interview about the episode, series creator and writer Veena Sud spoke about how she decided to end Ray Seward's story this way: "We debated a little bit what should be the end of Ray's story, and very quickly realized: Let's tell the truth. And let the audience have their heart broken in the way the families of these prisoners have their hearts broken. It's a great credit to Peter [Sarsgaard] that over time we get to really understand that this man — and everybody — has humanity. Everybody has a reason for what they do, good and bad. It doesn't always end well."

In the same interview, Peter Sarsgaard (Ray Seward) spoke about the episode: "I had lots of anxiety. It’s interesting playing Ray, because I so in my heart believe that I’m guilty — because I am guilty on some level — that it wasn’t like I was filled with self-righteous indignation. He’s not the right guy to be defending himself. He’s filled with a lot of self-loathing. In terms of acting it, I was really excited to act with Mireille. She was the first person to have told me that Episode 10 would be a lot of the two of us...I was really excited about that."

== Reception ==
=== Critical reception ===
"Six Minutes" received critical acclaim from most reviewers, with many naming the episode as one of the best in the series. Alan Sepinwall of HitFix thought "Six Minutes" was "largely an illustration of the things that The Killing can do very well, given both its structure and the personnel on-hand. But it was also at times a reminder of the limitations of this particular creative team." Chris King of TVOvermind stated, "For a show as dark and gritty as The Killing, this may have been the show's bleakest episode to date, but the sad tone and difficult material did not take away from the astounding performances...and the expertly written drama that filled 'Six Minutes' from beginning to end." The A.V. Club's Phil Dyess-Nugent gave the episode a perfect "A" grade, to become the best-reviewed episode of the entire series by that website.

=== Ratings ===
The episode was watched by 1.47 million viewers with a rating of 0.4 in the 18-49 ages demographic, a slight rise from the previous episode.
