= Camille Thoman =

American film director

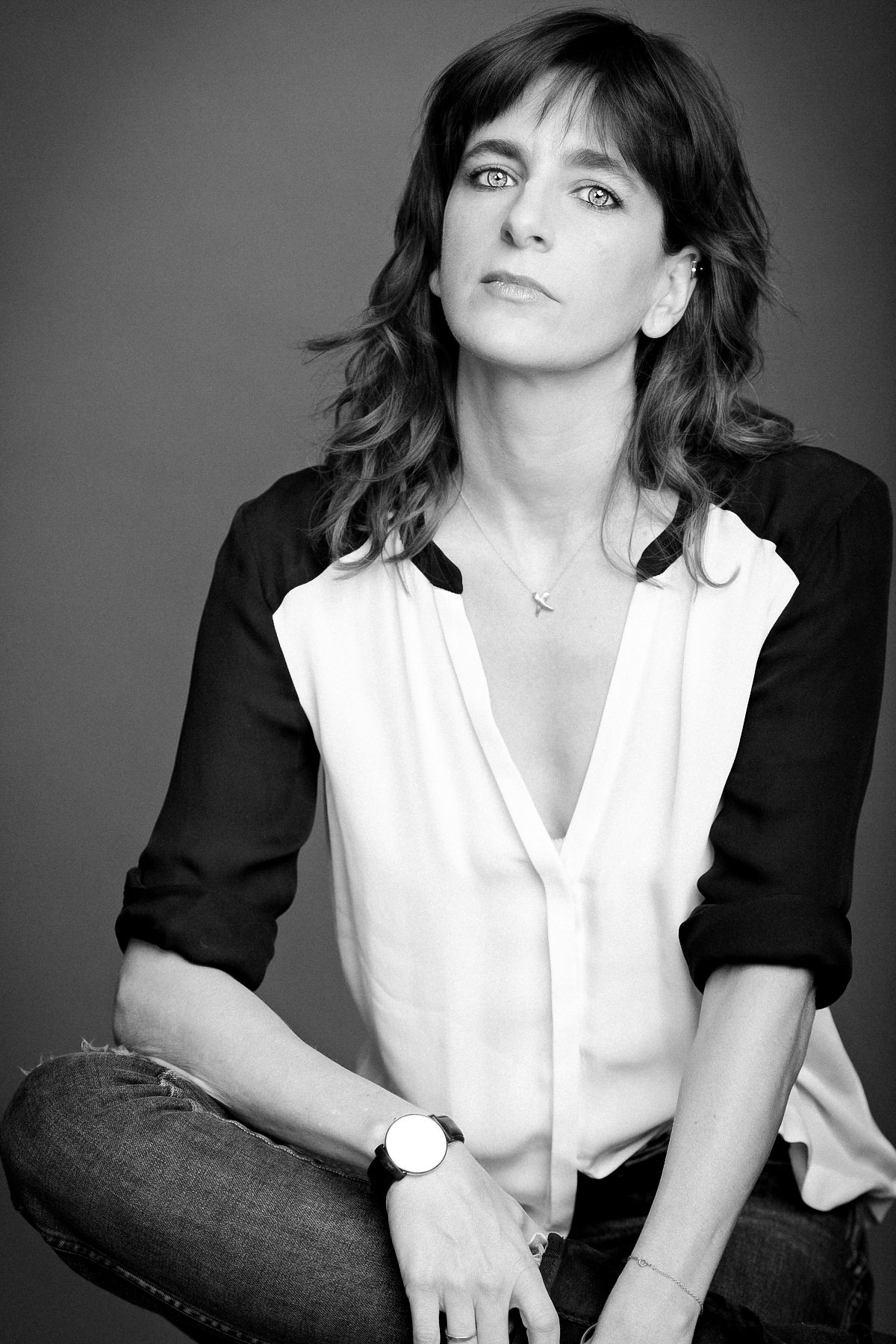
Camille Thoman

Camille Thoman is an English director and writer best known for her thriller Never Here, starring Mireille Enos and Sam Shepard, and her PBS documentary The Longest Game.. Thoman's solo performance pieces have been performed by her at The Young Vic in London and broadcast on the BBC.
