= Gran Vía 35, Madrid =

Former concert hall in Madrid, Spain

Coordinates: 40°25′12″N 3°42′17″W

Gran Vía 35
- Gran Vía 35
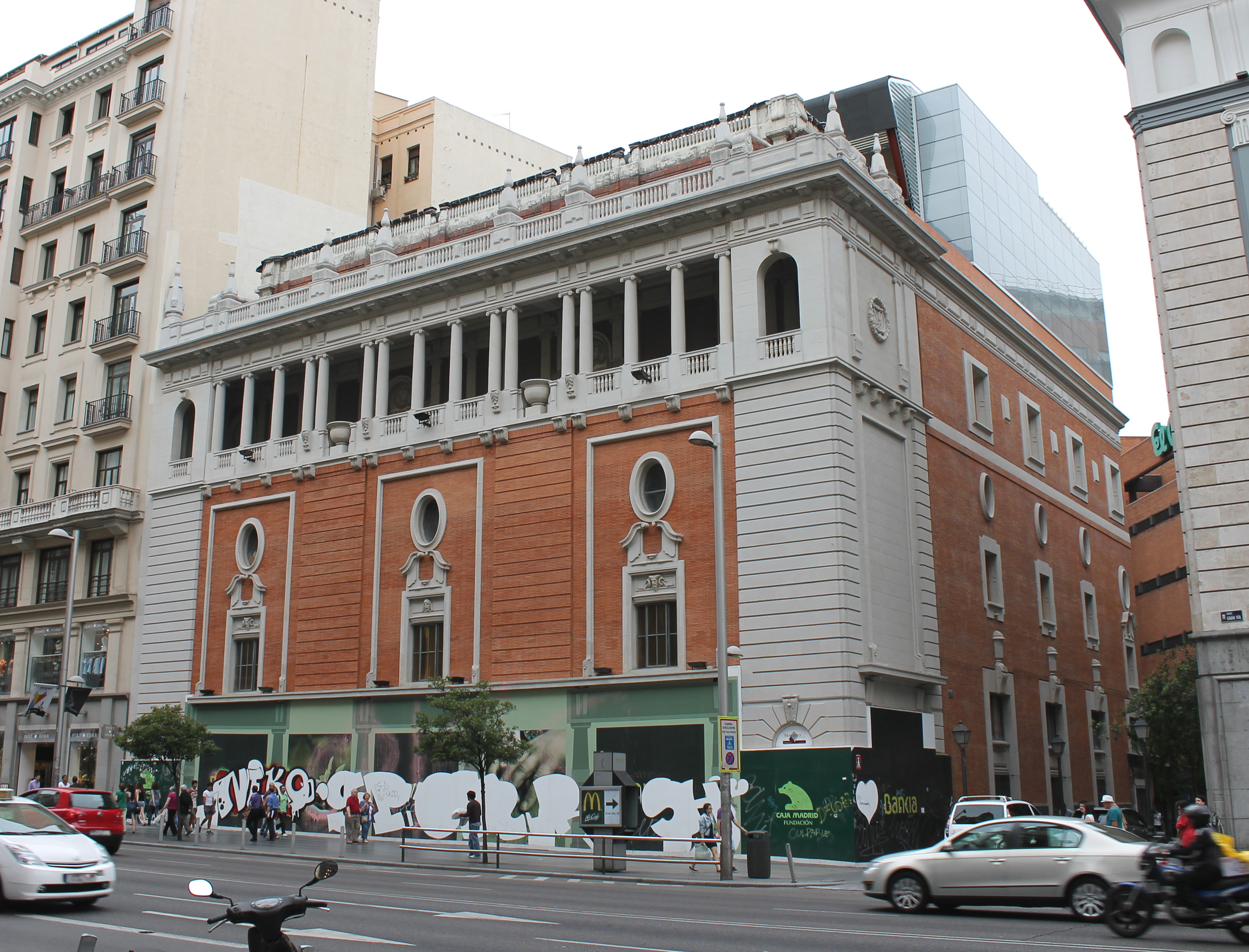
- Interactive map of the Gran Vía 35 area

General information
- Type: concert hall, movie theater
- Location: Madrid, Spain

Design and construction
- Architect: Secundino Zuazo

The Gran Vía 35 Building, also known as Palacio de la Música, is a theater located at Gran Vía 35 in Madrid. It was commissioned by the Sociedad Anónima General de Espectáculos (SAGE) and built by architect Secundino Zuazo Ugalde in 1926.

== History ==
The building was designed and built during the construction process of Gran Vía, on a surface area of just over one thousand square meters. It was initially designed as a concert hall, and by 1928 it began to be used as a movie theater. Blockbusters such as Gone with the Wind were screened on the premises. Initially it was thought to name it as Sala Olimpia, later as Musical Cinema and finally as Palacio de la Música. During its construction, the night of December 4, 1925 part of the roof collapsed. This event caused the interior to be redesigned, which caused a delay in the final delivery of the work.

The first film screened, in 1926, was The American Venus by Frank Tuttle.
