= Irene Miracle =

American actress

- Born: United States
- Occupations: Actress, director
- Years active: 1975–2009
- Known for: Midnight Express

Irene Miracle is an American film and television actress and director.

== Early life ==
Miracle was raised in Oklahoma of "French Acadian ... Scots-Irish, Russian, French and Osage" descent.

=== Acting career ===
Her first film appearance was as a murder victim in Night Train Murders (1975), an Italian Last House on the Left-clone. Her most prestigious role was in Alan Parker's Midnight Express (1978), a worldwide box office success. For her role as the girlfriend of the incarcerated protagonist, she won the Golden Globe Award for New Star of the Year - Female. Miracle followed that film with another major role in Dario Argento's Inferno (1980), as a woman who comes to believe the New York City apartment building she lives in also houses a centuries-old witch. Since then, she has continued her acting work, while also writing, directing and producing.

In 1979, Miracle appeared in the episode "Now You See Her..." of the NBC television crime drama series The Eddie Capra Mysteries.

=== Directing career ===
In 2009, Miracle wrote and directed the short drama film Changeling (a.k.a. Dawnland).

== Filmography ==
Film
Year	Title	Role	Notes
1975	Night Train Murders	Margaret Hoffenbach	
1976	La portiera nuda (The Naked Doorwoman)	Gianna	
1978	Midnight Express	Susan	
1980	Inferno	Rose Elliot	
1986	In the Shadow of Kilimanjaro	Lee Ringtree	
1986	The Last of Philip Banter	Elizabeth Banter	
1986	Laughing Horse		TV movie
1988	From Hollywood to Deadwood	Marcia Diamond	
1989	Nick Knight	Nurse	TV movie
1989	Veiled Threat	Fran	
1989	Puppet Master	Dana Hadley	
1990	Shattered Dreams	Elaine	TV movie
1990	Watchers II	Sarah Ferguson	
1994	One Plus Two Equals Four	Helen	
1996	2090	Stone	
1997	Walking Thunder	Emma McKay	(final film role)
2009	Changeling (a.k.a. Dawnland)		Writing and Directing
