= Gregg Henry =

American actor (born 1952)

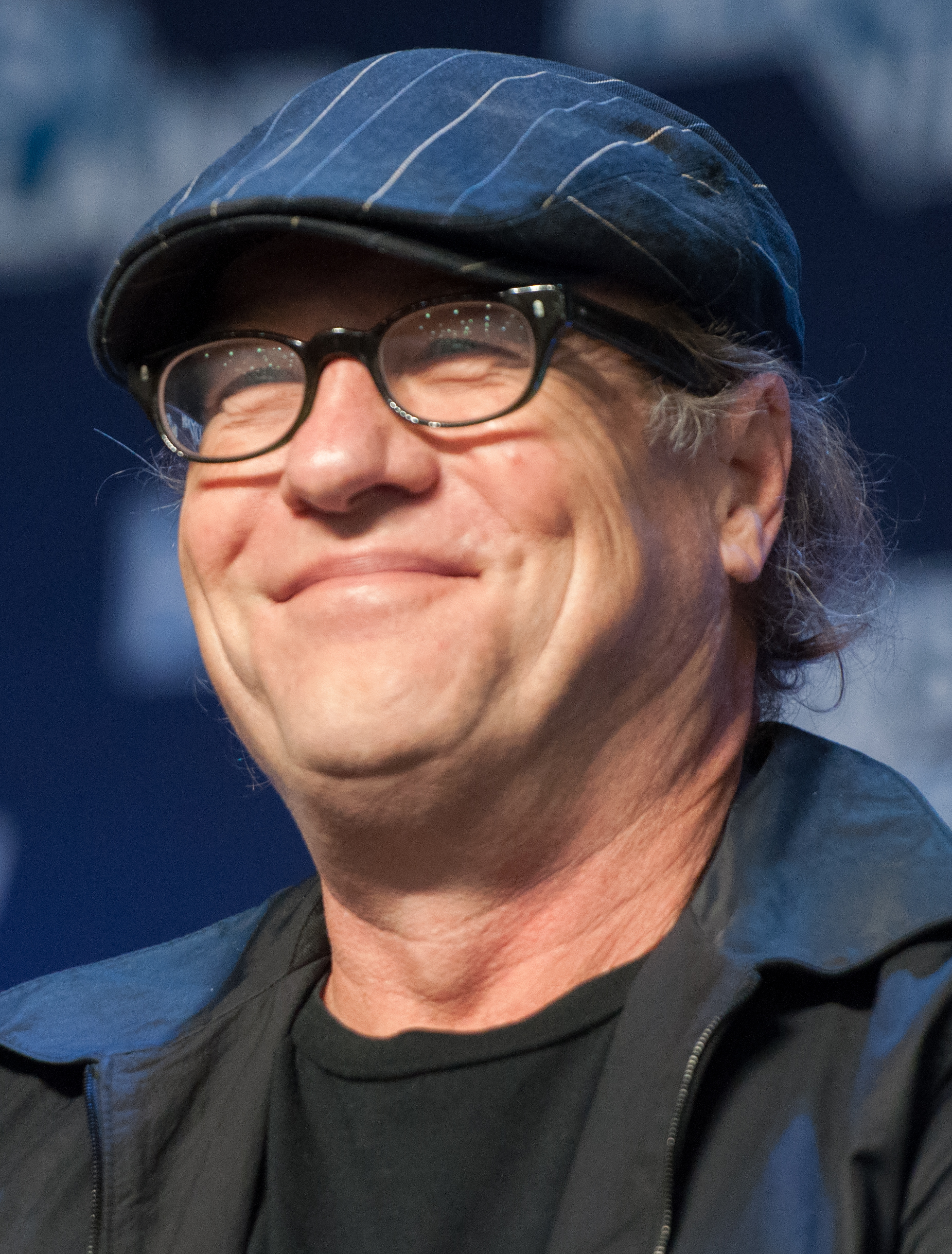
- Henry in 2016
- Born: Gregg Lee Henry; May 6, 1952 (age 74); Lakewood, Colorado, U.S.
- Education: University of Washington
- Occupation: Actor
- Years active: 1976–present
- Spouse: Lisa James

Gregg Lee Henry (born May 6, 1952) is an American actor. He is best known for his performance as serial killer Dennis Rader in the television film The Hunt for the BTK Killer and for playing "heavies" in various films, such as Payback (1999), Marvel Studios' Guardians of the Galaxy films and Brian De Palma's Body Double (1984). He has collaborated with De Palma frequently over the years, acting in six of his films.

== Early life ==
Henry was born May 6, 1952, in Lakewood, Colorado. He attended the University of Washington.

== Career ==
He has been featured in over 75 television programs, including The Riches; Firefly; Chicago Med; 24; Airwolf; CSI: Crime Scene Investigation; Murder, She Wrote; Gilmore Girls; Matlock; In the Heat of the Night; L.A. Law; Falcon Crest; Designing Women; Moonlighting; Magnum, P.I.; Rich Man, Poor Man Book II; The Mentalist; Castle; Glee; Burn Notice and Breakout Kings.

He played Hugh Pannetta alongside Eddie Izzard and Minnie Driver on the FX television series The Riches. He played the role of Dobbs in the USA Network series White Collar and Hollis Doyle on the ABC series Scandal. Starting June 10, 2013, he played Detective Carl Reddick in The Killing.

Henry has frequently appeared in James Gunn's productions. He appeared as Peter Quill's grandfather Jason in the Marvel Cinematic Universe, Jack MacReady in Slither, John Felkner in Super, and Edward Mazursky in Creature Commandos. He also portrayed the title role in Julius Caesar as part of the Shakespeare in the Park theater program.

== Personal life ==
Henry is married to American theatre director Lisa James.

== Filmography ==
=== Film ===
Year	Title	Role	Notes
1978	Mean Dog Blues	Paul Ramsey	
1979	Hot Rod	Brian Edison	
1981	Just Before Dawn	Warren	
1983	Funny Money	Ben Turtle	
1983	Scarface	Charles Goodson	Representative from Washington
1984	Body Double	Sam Bouchard	
1986	The Last of Philip Banter	Robert Prescott	
1988	Fair Game	Gene	
1989	Casualties of War	Prosecutor	Scenes deleted
1990	Dark Avenger	Dr. Colin Tremaine	TV movie
1992	Raising Cain	Lieutenant Terri	
1995	Bodily Harm	J.D. Prejon	
1998	Star Trek: Insurrection	Gallatin	
1999	Payback	Val Resnick	
2000	Sleep Easy, Hutch Rimes	Cotton Proudfit	
2001	Southlander	Lane Windbird	
2001	Layover	Jack Gillardo	
2002	Femme Fatale	Shiff	
2002	Ballistic: Ecks vs. Sever	FBI Agent Clark, DIA Director Robert Gant	
2003	Purgatory Flats	Dean Mecklin	
2003	Sin	Conrad	
2003	Silent Partner	Ambassador LaFontaine	
2006	Slither	Jack MacReady	
2006	United 93	Colonel Robert Marr	
2006	The Black Dahlia	Pete Lukins	
2010	Super	Detective John Felkner	
2011	Isolation	Dr. Lawrence Moore	
2011	The Reunion	Kyle Wills	
2012	Unfair and Imbalanced	Jim Moran	
2012	The Patriot of America	Samuel Burwell	Voice
2012	Any Day Now	Lambert	
2014	Guardians of the Galaxy	Jason Quill	
2016	Jason Bourne	Richard Webb	
2016	The Belko Experiment	The Voice	
2017	Teen Titans: The Judas Contract	Brother Blood (voice)	Direct-to-video
2017	Guardians of the Galaxy Vol. 2	Jason Quill	
2018	Office Uprising	Franklin Gantt	
2019	Stand!	Mike Sokolowski	
2022	Look Into the Fire	Professor Hirsch	
2023	Guardians of the Galaxy Vol. 3	Jason Quill	

=== Television ===
Year	Title	Role	Notes
1976	Rich Man, Poor Man Book II	Wesley Jordache	Miniseries
1978	Pearl	Lieutenant Doug North	Miniseries
1979	Dummy	Assistant District Attorney Smith	Television film
1982	The Blue and the Gray	Lester Bedell	Miniseries
1983	The Love Boat	Gregory Steven Leonard	Episode: "He Ain't Heavy"
1984	Airwolf	Robert Villers	Episode: "The Hunted"
1985	Moonlighting	Paul McCain	Episode: "The Next Murder You Hear"
1985–1996	Murder, She Wrote	Various roles	7 episodes
1986	Hardcastle and McCormick	Tommy Kitchens	Episode: "Poker Night"
1987	Designing Women	Jack Dent	Episode: "Grand Slam Thank You Ma'am"
1987	The Law & Harry McGraw	Walter Winston	Episode: "Beware the Ides of May"
1987	Bates Motel	Tom Fuller	Television film
1987–1988	Werewolf	Officer Ritter	Episode: "Nightmare in Blue"
1988–1994	L.A. Law	Robert Cullen, Samuel Barkwell	3 episodes
1990	Matlock	Nick Beloit	Episode: "The D.A."
1991-1992	The Torkelsons	Randall	2 episodes
1992	Civil Wars	Gordon Dallek	Episode: "Oboe Phobia"
1993	In the Heat of the Night	George Deschamps	2 episodes
1993	Kiss of a Killer	Richard	Television film
1993	Victim of Love: The Shannon Mohr Story	Det. Don Brooks	Television film
1994	Walker, Texas Ranger	Reid Stedler	Episode: "Stolen Lullaby"
1995	JAG	Captain Reed	Episode: "Desert Son"
1996	Terminal	Brian	Television film
1997	Tidal Wave: No Escape	Edgar Purcell	Television film
1999–2001	Family Law	Michael Holt	7 episodes
2000	Cover Me: Based on the True Life of an FBI Family	Henry Crowe	Episode: "Absolution"
2001	CSI: Crime Scene Investigation	Special Agent Rick Culpepper	Episode: "The Strip Strangler"
2001–2002	Boston Public	Detective McGill	2 episodes
2002	Firefly	Sheriff Bourne	Episode: "The Train Job"
2002	Boomtown	Robert Colson	Episode: "The Squeeze"
2002	The Agency	Senator Bowden	Episode: "Heartless"
2003	Star Trek: Enterprise	Zho'Kaan	Episode: "Dawn"
2003	Judging Amy	Morgan Simmons	Episode: "Wild Card"
2003	24	Jonathan Wallace	4 episodes
2003	The Lyon's Den	A.U.S.A	2 episodes
2003	Windfall	Bill Trask	television film
2004	The Handler	Griffin Klein	Episode: "Acts of Congress"
2005	Heartless	Lieutenant Russ Carter	Television film
2005	The Hunt for the BTK Killer	Dennis Rader	Television film
2005–2007	Eyes	Clay Burgess	7 episodes
2005–2007	Gilmore Girls	Mitchum Huntzberger	20 episodes
2006	CSI: Miami	William Preston	Episode: "Death Eminent"
2007–2008	The Riches	Hugh Panetta	Series regular
2008	ER	Officer Mark Downey	Episode: "Haunted"
2008	The Mentalist	Cal Trask	Episode: "Red-Handed"
2008	Sparky & Mikaela	Mikaela's Dad	Episode: "Pilot"
2009	The Beast	Frank Oland, Mike Parks	Episode: "Hothead"
2009	Dollhouse	William Bashford	Episode: "Haunted"
2009	Dark Blue	Jimmy Boyd	Episode: "Guns, Strippers and Wives"
2009	Numb3rs	Pete Fox	Episode: "Friendly Fire"
2009	Castle	Winston Wellesley	Episode: "Kill the Messenger"
2009	Glee	Russell Fabray	Episode: "Ballad"
2009–2011	Hung	Mike Hunt	25 episodes
2010	Grey's Anatomy	Dr. Gracie	Episode: "The Time Warp"
2010	Three Rivers	Lester Dimes	Episode: "Case Histories"
2010	The Good Guys	Wayne Young	Episode: "$3.52"
2010	Medium	Coach Swanson	Episode: "Talk to the Hand"
2010	CSI: Miami	Roger Cavanaugh	Episode: "Blood Sugar"
2011	Harry's Law	Mitchell Eaves	Episode: "With Friends Like These..."
2011	CHAOS	Kurt Neimeyer	Episode: "Glory Days"
2011	Mr. Sunshine	Chuck Ferguson	Episode: "Family Business"
2011	Burn Notice	Ian Covey	Episode: "Acceptable Loss"
2011–2012	Breakout Kings	Richard Wendell	2 episodes
2012	NCIS: Los Angeles	Alex Harris	Episode: "Blye, K."
2012	Leverage	Trent Hazlit	Episode: "The Toy Job"
2012	White Collar	Henry Dobbs, Robert MacLeish	2 episodes
2012–2013	Bunheads	Rico	4 episodes
2012–2017	Scandal	Hollis Doyle	22 episodes
2013–2014	The Killing	Carl Reddick	16 episodes
2014	Lizzie Borden Took an Ax	Hosea M. Knowlton	Television film
2014–2015	The Following	Dr. Arthur Strauss	6 episodes
2014–2016	Hell on Wheels	Brigham Young	7 episodes
2015–2016	CSI: Cyber	Calvin Mundo	3 episodes
2016	Chicago Med	Dr. David Downey	8 episodes
2016	Gilmore Girls: A Year in the Life	Mitchum Huntzberger	Episode: "Spring"
2016	Those Who Can't	Bryce's Dad	Episode: "Mid-Bryce Crisis"
2017	Supergirl	Peter Thompson	Episode: "Alex"
2018	Black Lightning	Agent Martin Proctor	7 episodes
2019	The Rookie	Judge	Episode: "Homefront"
2021	Hit & Run	Martin Wexler	9 episodes
2021	The Resident	Aaron Kranepool	Episode: "Now What?"
2021	Law & Order: Organized Crime	Edmund Ross	3 episodes
2021–2022	Blade Runner: Black Lotus	Senator Bannister (voice)	4 episodes
2025	Creature Commandos	Edward Mazursky (voice)	Episode: "A Very Funny Monster"

=== Video games ===
Year	Title	Role
1999	Star Trek: Hidden Evil	Gal'na
2012	Lollipop Chainsaw	Gideon Starling
