= Aaron Douglas (actor) =

Canadian actor (born 1971)

- Douglas at Dragon Con in 2026
- Born: August 23, 1971 (age 55); New Westminster, British Columbia, Canada
- Occupation: Actor
- Years active: 1998–present
- Spouse: Debbie (died 2004)
- Children: 1

Aaron Douglas (born August 23, 1971) is a Canadian actor and writer. He is best known for his role as Galen Tyrol on the Sci-Fi Channel's television program Battlestar Galactica.

Douglas headlined on the CTV drama The Bridge, which was also picked up by CBS for broadcast in the United States. Douglas played Frank Leo, a charismatic police union leader who is simultaneously battling criminals on the street while facing down corruption within the ranks of his own department. CBS ordered thirteen episodes, which began production in May 2009 but the series was dropped after just three episodes had been aired. Douglas starred alongside fellow Battlestar Galactica actor Paul Campbell in a Syfy original movie, Killer Mountain, which premiered August 27, 2011.

== Early life ==
Aaron Douglas was born in New Westminster, a city in the Lower Mainland on the South Coast of British Columbia. His father Michael Douglas is a professor and his mother Arlene Elliot is a psychologist. He has a brother Chris who is four years his junior. The family lived in Vancouver until Douglas was 10 at which time they moved to Creston in the interior of British Columbia where he attended Prince Charles Secondary School as a teenager and acted in school productions, played in a rock band and participated in community theater. At age 26, he quit his job and moved back to Vancouver to pursue a career in acting. He studied at Canada's famed William Davis Centre for Actors Study at VanArts.

After completing the program at VanArts, Douglas performed with the Okanagan Shakespeare Company in Canada. Many of his early acting jobs were the result of his work as a "reader" for auditions. His job was to read the other side of the dialogue for the person auditioning for a role. Often, after the audition was finished, the director would turn to him and say something like, "You know that cop role with three lines, do you want to do it?". He began building his resume off those small parts.

== Personal life ==
On November 1, 2004, Douglas' wife Debbie died from breast cancer. He has a son, Taylor, from a previous relationship, born in 1996.

Douglas has a love of hockey and has been on skates since he was two years old. He still plays hockey as an adult, usually as a goalie. He is a Vancouver Canucks fan and can usually be found at home games screaming at the referees along with friends and fellow Sci-Fi Channel alumni Daniel Bacon, Dan Payne, and Ryan Robbins. He is also a fan of Wil Wheaton from Star Trek: The Next Generation. Douglas has admitted to going "fangirl" on him when meeting him for the first time at a convention in 2008.

== Filmography ==
=== Film ===
Year	Title	Role	Notes
2003	Stealing Sinatra	Patrolman #1	
2003	Final Destination 2	Deputy Steve Adams	
2003	X2	Stryker Soldier #1	
2003	The Lizzie McGuire Movie	Paparazzi #2	
2003	Paycheck	Scientist #3	Uncredited
2004	Saved!	Paramedic	
2004	Walking Tall	Casino Stickman	
2004	The Chronicles of Riddick	Young Meccan Soldier	
2004	I, Robot	USR Attorney #1	
2004	Catwoman	Detective #1	
2005	White Noise	Frank Black	
2005	The Exorcism of Emily Rose	Assistant District Attorney #1	
2006	Chaos	Police Officer	Uncredited
2006	Man About Town	Agency Partner #1	
2007	Butterfly on a Wheel	Front Desk Officer	
2007	Blood: A Butcher's Tale	Sam	Segment: "The Little Things"
2009	Battlestar Galactica: The Plan	Galen Tyrol	
2014	Death Do Us Part	Harry Simpson	
2014	The Mentor	Paul Allenham	
2015	The Driftless Area	Fireman	
2016	The Monster	Jesse	
2017	Little Pink House	Governor	
2017	Todd and the Book of Pure Evil: The End of the End	Gavin (voice)	
2018	In Plainview	Penner	
2019	Thunderbird	Officer Joe Fletcher	
2020	Operation Christmas Drop	Sampson	
2023	Double Life	Sheldon Roberts	

=== Television ===
Year	Title	Role	Notes
2000	The Inspectors 2: A Shred of Evidence	Worker	Television film
2000	Cold Squad	Dean Logan	Episode: "Root Cause"
2000	Hollywood Off-Ramp	N/A	Episode: "Judgement Day"
2000–2002	Stargate SG-1	Moac / Jaffa	2 episodes
2001	Love and Treason	Paramedic	Television film
2001	The Outer Limits	Kevin Lockwood	Episode: "Free Spirit"
2002	Dark Angel	Hotel Clerk	Episode: "Exposure"
2002	Beyond Belief: Fact or Fiction	Detective Dean Santoni	Episode: "The Flower Jury"
2002	Breaking News	Greg Johnson	Episode: "Dunne's Choice"
2002	American Dreams	Line Guy	Episode: "Pilot"
2002	Taken	Corporal	Episode: "Jacob and Jesse"
2002–2004	The Chris Isaak Show	Fender Bender Driver / Reader	2 episodes
2002–2008	Smallville	Deputy Michael Birdego / Pierce	2 episodes
2003	Before We Ruled the Earth	Tsir	Episode: "Hunt or Be Hunted"
2003	Before I Say Goodbye	Detective Jack Sclafani	Television film
2003	The Stranger Beside Me	District Attorney Baines	Television film
2003	Just Cause	Agent Schroder	Episode: "Hide and Seek"
2003	Black Sash	Officer Danny Bryant	Episode: "Snap Shots"
2003	Out of Order	Boston	6 episodes
2003	Lucky 7	Steven	Television film
2003	Jeremiah	Davis	Episode: "Strange Attractors"
2003–2009	Battlestar Galactica	Galen Tyrol	Main role (69 episodes)
2004	The L Word	Citizen	2 episodes
2004	Andromeda	Wezlow	Episode: "Time Out of Mind'
2004	10.5	Tent City Soldier	2 episodes
2004	The Dead Zone	Rob Coulter	Episode: "Total Awareness"
2006	Whistler	Lance	Episode: "Gathering Clouds"
2006	Battlestar Galactica: The Resistance	Galen Tyrol	Main role (7 episodes)
2007	Bionic Woman	Prison Guard	2 episodes
2007	Reaper	Delivery Demon	Episode: "What About Blob?"
2009	No Heroics	Dad	Television film
2010	The Bridge	Frank Leo	Main role (12 episodes)
2010	One Angry Juror	Frank Riley	Television film
2010– 2011	Hellcats	Bill Curran	9 episodes
2011	Ghost Storm	Greg Goropolis	Television film
2011	Killer Mountain	Ward Donovan	Television film
2011	Eureka	Ray Darlton	Episode: "This One Time at Space Camp..."
2011	Flashpoint	Gil Collins	Episode: "Day Game"
2012	The Firm	Gerald Sykes	Episode: "Chapter Twelve"
2012	Written by a Kid	Tychseria	Episode: "Fire City"
2012	True Justice	Agent Adrian Sloan	2 episodes
2012	Shelf Life	Canada Doug	Episode: "Oh, Canada!"
2013	Hemlock Grove	Sheriff Tom Sworn	11 episodes
2013	The Killing	Evan Henderson	12 episodes
2014	Falling Skies	Cooper Marshall	Episode: "Mind Wars"
2014	Zodiac: Signs of the Apocalypse	Agent Woodward	Television film
2014	The Strain	Roger Luss	Episode: "For Services Rendered"
2015	Girlfriends' Guide to Divorce	Doug Franklin	Episode: "F-you, Rob Frumpkis!"
2015	The Returned	Tony Darrow	6 episodes
2015–2017	iZombie	Chuck Burd	2 episodes
2016	The Flash	Russell Glosson / The Turtle	2 episodes
2016	The X-Files	Lindquist	Episode: "Founder's Mutation"
2016	Once Upon a Time	Fendrake the Healer	Episode: "Devil's Due"
2016	Dirk Gently's Holistic Detective Agency	Gordon Rimmer	8 episodes
2017	Imposters	Gary Heller	5 episodes
2017	Supernatural	Pierce Moncrieff	Episode: "The Raid"
2018	Salvation	Joe Riggs	Episode: "Fall Out"
2019	Unspeakable	Jim Krepke	3 episodes
2019	The Twilight Zone	Mitch	Episode: "The Wunderkind"
2019	When Calls the Heart	Amos Dixon	Episode: "A Call from the Past"
2019	Mystery 101: Playing Dead	Karl Muhlenbeck	Television film
2019	Aurora Teagarden Mysteries: A Very Foul Play	Boyd	Television film
2019	Van Helsing	Colonel Nicholson	3 episodes
2020	Garage Sale Mysteries: Searched and Seized	Owen O'Neill	Television film
2020	Crossword Mysteries: Terminal Descent	Gregory Sackett	Television film
2021	Are You Afraid of the Dark?	Charlie Murphy	2 episodes
2021	A Clüsterfünke Christmas	Windmere	Television film
2022	Motherland: Fort Salem	Colonel Jarrett	5 episodes
2022	The Watchful Eye	Otis Winthrop III	3 episodes
2022	The Wedding Cottage	Daryl Froelich	Television film
2023	Buying Back My Daughter	Ron	Television film
2023	The Christmas Hero	Joseph Murray	Television film
2024	Wild Cards	Chris Day	Episode: "Con with the Wind"
2024	Resident Alien	General Devanney	Episode: "Avian Flu"
2024	Lego Dreamzzz	Abraham (voice)	Episode: "Romancing the Spear"
2024	Murder in a Small Town	Sgt. Sid Sokolowski	Main cast
2024	The Ainsley McGregor Mysteries: A Case for the Winemaker	Jack Preston	Television film
2025	The Irrational	Sheriff Dayton	Episode: "Straight from the Heart"
2025	Stick	Dale	Episode: “Pilot”
2026	Carrie (TV series)		S1 E7
2027	Vought Rising		Upcoming

=== Video games ===
Year	Title	Role	Notes
2013	Dead Rising 3	Adam Kane	
2014	Watch Dogs	Jordi Chin	Voice
2014	Ancient Space	Sgt. Major Powell	
2017	Watch Dogs 2	Jordi Chin	DLC
2021	Watch Dogs: Legion	Jordi Chin	Both story and DLC
2022	Hardspace: Shipbreaker	Weaver	

== Written Works ==
=== Graphic Novels ===
- 10 Years To Death (2021)
- Borealis (2023)

== Awards and nominations ==
At the 2013 Canadian Screen Awards Douglas was nominated for Best TV Series Dramatic Guest Performance for his role in the TV series Flashpoint, episode: "Day Game".
