= Mireille Enos =

American actress

- Enos at the 2026 Toronto International Film Festival.
- Born: September 22, 1975 (age 50); Kansas City, Missouri, U.S.
- Education: Brigham Young University (BA)
- Occupation: Actress
- Years active: 1994–present
- Spouse: Alan Ruck (m. 2008)
- Children: 2

Mireille Enos (/mɪəˈreɪ ˈiːnəs/; born September 22, 1975) is an American actress known for the lead role as homicide detective Sarah Linden in the drama series The Killing.

== Early life ==
Enos was born on September 22, 1975, in Kansas City, Missouri. She is the daughter of Monique, a French teacher, and Jon Goree Enos. Her father is American, from Texas, and her mother is from France. Enos speaks French fluently.

Enos has two brothers and two sisters. Her older sister, Veronique Enos Kaefer, is the vice president of philanthropy at The Michael J. Fox Foundation.

Her family moved to Sugar Land, Texas, when she was five years old. She attended Houston's High School for the Performing and Visual Arts, where she underwent acting training. Enos studied theater at Brigham Young University (BYU) but left during her third year to pursue acting in New York City. While a BYU student, she won the Irene Ryan Award at the Kennedy Center in Washington, D.C., an award annually presented to the nation's top collegiate actor.

== Career ==
=== 1994–2009 ===
Enos made her screen acting debut in the television film Without Consent (1994). She made her feature film debut with a small role in the romantic comedy Someone Like You (2001) starring Ashley Judd. She has guest-starred in a number of television shows, including Sex and the City, Strong Medicine, Rescue Me, Without a Trace, Crossing Jordan, CSI: Miami, Medium and Law & Order: Criminal Intent.

Enos played Perdita in the 2002 Shakespeare Theatre Company production of The Winter's Tale at the Lansburgh Theater in Washington, D.C. She appeared in the 2005 Broadway revival production of Who's Afraid of Virginia Woolf?, which starred Kathleen Turner and Bill Irwin. For her performance she received a Tony Award nomination for Best Featured Actress in a Play.

In 2007, Enos joined the cast of the HBO drama series Big Love, about a polygamous family. She played the roles of twin sisters JoDean Marquart and Kathy Marquart. She was a regular cast member in the third and fourth seasons.

=== 2010–present ===
In 2010, Enos was cast in her first lead role in a television series: Detective Sarah Linden in the AMC drama series The Killing, based on the Danish television series Forbrydelsen. For her role as Linden, Enos received nominations for an Primetime Emmy Award for Outstanding Lead Actress in a Drama Series, Golden Globe Award for Best Actress – Television Series Drama, and three Saturn Award for Best Actress on Television. The series ran for four seasons, ending in 2014.

Following her breakout role in The Killing, Enos began her career in feature films. She played Karin Lane, the wife of Brad Pitt's character in World War Z (2013). Also in 2013, she co-starred as Josh Brolin's character's wife in Gangster Squad, and appeared opposite Reese Witherspoon in the crime drama Devil's Knot, based on a true story, the West Memphis Three. In 2014, she appeared in the crime thriller Sabotage directed by David Ayer and later starred in drama film If I Stay directed by R. J. Cutler, based on the novel of the same name by Gayle Forman.

Enos co-starred later that year alongside Ryan Reynolds in The Captive, directed by Atom Egoyan. Enos was cast as lead actress in the thriller Never Here, which was directed by Camille Thoman.

In March 2015, it was announced that Enos had been cast as the lead character in the ABC legal drama series, The Catch, produced by Shonda Rhimes. She starred as the lead character Alice Vaughan, the head of a high-end private detective agency. The Catch aired its first 10-episode season in spring 2016, and a second 10-episode season in 2017 as part of ABC's "TGIT" Thursday night lineup.

Also in March 2015, it was announced Enos would star alongside Olivia Cooke in Katie Says Goodbye, an independent film. That same year, she starred in Behold My Heart, directed by Joshua Leonard.

In 2019, she appeared as Marissa Wiegler in the action drama streaming television series Hanna on Amazon Prime Video. The series is based on the 2011 film of the same name, with Cate Blanchett originating the role of Wiegler.

In August 2020, it was announced the 2018 film The Lie (her reunion with The Killing's showrunner Veena Sud) would be included in Amazon Prime Video's Welcome to the Blumhouse horror film anthology. It was released in the anthology's first installment on October 6, 2020.

== Personal life ==
Enos married actor Alan Ruck. They have two children, and she has two stepchildren from Ruck's previous marriage.

She was raised in the Church of Jesus Christ of Latter-day Saints but is no longer a practicing member.

== Acting credits ==
Key
†	Denotes films that have not yet been released

=== Film ===
Year	Title	Role	Notes
2001	Someone Like You	Yoga Instructor #1	
2005	Chasing Leonard	Lucinda	Short film
2006	Falling Objects	Isobel Walker	Short film
2013	Gangster Squad	Connie O'Mara	
2013	World War Z	Karin Lane	
2013	Devil's Knot	Vicki Hutcheson	
2013	Wild Horses	Mills	Short film
2014	Sabotage	DEA Agent Lizzy Murray	
2014	The Captive	Tina Lane	
2014	If I Stay	Kat Hall	
2016	Katie Says Goodbye	Tracey	
2017	Never Here	Miranda Fall	
2018	Don't Worry, He Won't Get Far on Foot	Maggie Lynch	
2018	Dark Was the Night	Nancy	
2018	The Lie	Rebecca Marston	
2023	Miranda's Victim	Zeola	
2025	On the End	Freckles	

=== Television ===
Year	Title	Role	Notes
1994	Without Consent	Naomi	Television film
1996	Face of Evil	Brianne Dwyer	Television film
1999	Sex and the City	Jenna	Episode: "Shortcomings"
2001	The Education of Max Bickford	Carla Byrd	2 episodes
2003	Strong Medicine	Fern	Episode: "Speculum for a Heavyweight"
2004	Rescue Me	Karen	Episode: "Mom"
2006	Without a Trace	Jessica Lawson	Episode: "911"
2006	Standoff	Dana	Episode: "Man of Steele"
2006	Shark	Chloe Gorman	Episode: "Dial M for Monica"
2007	Crossing Jordan	Sandy Walsh	Episode: "Crazy Little Thing Called Love"
2007–2010	Big Love	JoDean Marquart / Kathy Marquart	Recurring role (season 2), main cast (seasons 3–4)
2008	Numbers	Grace Ferraro	Episode: "End Game"
2008	CSI: Miami	Lucy Maddox	Episode: "Down to the Wire"
2008	Medium	Kelly Winters	Episode: "Drowned World"
2009	Lie to Me	Cheryl Ambrose	Episode: "The Better Half"
2009	Law & Order: Criminal Intent	Julianna Morgan	Episode: "Identity Crisis"
2010	American Experience	Lucia Cutts	Episode: "Dolley Madison"
2011–2014	The Killing	Sarah Linden	Main cast
2016–2017	The Catch	Alice Vaughan	Main cast
2017	Philip K. Dick's Electric Dreams	Mother	Episode: "Father Thing"
2018	My Dinner with Hervé	Kathy Self	Television film
2019–2021	Hanna	Marissa Wiegler	Main cast
2019	Good Omens	War	Recurring role (series 1)
2023	Lucky Hank	Lily Devereaux	Main cast
2025	Task	Susan Brandis	2 episodes
2026	For All Mankind	Celia Boyd	Main cast (season 5)
2026	American Hostage	Barbara Heckman	8 episodes

=== Stage ===
Year	Title	Role	Notes
2001	The Invention of Love	Katharine Houseman	Mar 29 – June 30, 2001
2002	The Winter's Tale	Perdita	Aug 27 – October 20, 2002
2005	Who's Afraid of Virginia Woolf?	Honey	Mar 20 – September 4, 2005
2005	Absurd Person Singular	Eva	Oct 18 – December 4, 2005

=== Video games ===
Year	Title	Role	Notes
2020	NBA 2K21	Harper Dell	Also motion capture

== Awards and nominations ==
Year	Association	Category	Nominated work	Result
2005	Tony Awards	Best Featured Actress in a Play	Who's Afraid of Virginia Woolf?	Nominated
2011	Critics' Choice Television Awards	Best Actress in a Drama Series	The Killing	Nominated
2011	Golden Globe Awards	Best Actress – Television Series Drama	The Killing	Nominated
2011	Primetime Emmy Awards	Outstanding Lead Actress in a Drama Series	The Killing	Nominated
2011	Satellite Awards	Best Actress – Television Series Drama	The Killing	Nominated
2012	Saturn Awards	Best Actress on Television	The Killing	Nominated
2013	Saturn Awards	Best Actress on Television	The Killing	Nominated
