= List of Chicago Hope episodes =

Chicago Hope is an American medical drama television series created by David E. Kelley. It premiered on CBS on September 18, 1994, and ended on May 4, 2000, with a total of 141 episodes over the course of 6 seasons. The series is set in a fictional private charitable hospital in Chicago.

== Series overview ==
| Season | Episodes | Originally released | |
| Season | Episodes | First released | Last released |
|---|---|---|---|
| 1 | 22 | September 18, 1994 | May 22, 1995 |
| 2 | 23 | September 18, 1995 | May 20, 1996 |
| 3 | 26 | September 16, 1996 | May 19, 1997 |
| 4 | 24 | October 1, 1997 | May 13, 1998 |
| 5 | 24 | September 30, 1998 | May 19, 1999 |
| 6 | 22 | September 23, 1999 | May 4, 2000 |

== Episodes ==
=== Season 1 (1994–95) ===
| No. overall | No. in season | Title | Directed by | Written by | Original release date | Prod. code | US viewers (millions) |
|---|---|---|---|---|---|---|---|
| 1 | 1 | "Pilot" | Michael Pressman | David E. Kelley | September 18, 1994 | 2M79 | 22.5 |
Dr. Shutt has some difficulty concentrating on his patients after his wife files for divorce. Dr. Geiger agrees to separate conjoined twins, and Dr. Watters ponders suspending the eminent Dr. Thurmond's surgical privileges.
| 2 | 2 | "Over the Rainbow" | Michael Dinner | David E. Kelley | September 22, 1994 | 2M01 | 14.8 |
Dr. Geiger clashes with the hospital's executive committee after he performs an experimental procedure on a deceased patient. Dr. Shutt takes on a hapless HMO representative who insists that a less experienced, (and less expensive) surgeon perform a complex operation.
| 3 | 3 | "Food Chains" | Jeremy Kagan | David E. Kelley | September 29, 1994 | 2M03 | 12.9 |
Dr. Geiger prepares to transplant a baboon heart into a dying patient, but runs into opposition from the executive committee again, and Dr. Thurmond, who wants the baboon's bone marrow for an AIDS patient. Angela finds herself in a compromising position with the hospital's chief of staff.
| 4 | 4 | "With the Greatest of Ease" | James Frawley | David E. Kelley | October 6, 1994 | 2M02 | 16.5 |
An accident brings tragedy to a family trapeze act. Dr. Geiger walks the fine edge of sanity. Dr. Shutt has a nasty run-in with a bigoted patient. Camille returns to a scary, independent life without Aaron.
| 5 | 5 | "You Gotta Have Heart" | Tim Hunter | Michael Braverman | October 13, 1994 | 2M04 | 14.8 |
Dr. Watters supports a woman who refuses to give up on her legally dead infant. A baby boy needs a heart transplant. Dr. Shutt and Dr. Antonovich grow closer.
| 6 | 6 | "Shutt Down" | Steve Miner | S : Michael Nankin; S/T : Michael Braverman | October 20, 1994 | 2M06 | 16.3 |
Dr. Shutt struggles with his ambivalence over the death of a gang member who shot up the ER. A boy is mysteriously paralyzed after a successful operation to correct a circulatory defect.
| 7 | 7 | "Genevieve and Fat Boy" | Oz Scott | Michael Nankin & Dennis Cooper | November 3, 1994 | 2M05 | 16.5 |
Dr. Geiger performs a risky heart operation on an overweight mob killer who's a key witness for the FBI. Two weary residents plot a practical joke to get even with the dour Dr. Geiger. The budding relationship between Dr. Shutt and Dr. Antonovich takes an unexpected turn.
| 8 | 8 | "Death Be Proud" | Michael Schultz | Dennis Cooper | November 10, 1994 | 2M07 | 16.2 |
A 12-year-old girl arrives for surgery to correct a severely cleft palate and suffers serious complications from another birth defect. A young nurse interferes in Dr. Shutt's care for the comatose Dr. Antonovich.
| 9 | 9 | "Heartbreak" | Bill D'Elia | Michael Nankin | January 1, 1995 | 2M08 | 20.3 |
Camille feels more pressure over her decision to divorce Aaron when the rabbi who married them is admitted for a heart transplant, and it drives her into some uncharacteristic outbursts. Dr. Thurmond's behavior towards a new nurse comes under close scrutiny.
| 10 | 10 | "The Quarantine" | Thomas Schlamme | David E. Kelley | January 2, 1995 | 2M09 | 19.7 |
Dr. Geiger and Dr. Nyland learn that they've been exposed to the very contagious and deadly Ebola virus, and the resulting quarantine of those they've been in close contact with brings some emotional outbursts and revelations that change things forever.
| 11 | 11 | "Love and Hope" | Michael Dinner | David E. Kelley | January 9, 1995 | 2M10 | 19.0 |
Dr. Geiger takes part in a concert with his wife and her fellow patients. Aaron and Camille face new anxieties, and a patient admitted for one small problem ends up facing numerous ailments he never had before.
| 12 | 12 | "Great White Hope" | Claudia Weill | John Tinker | January 16, 1995 | 2M11 | 20.3 |
A teenage boxer whom Dr. Watters helped train suffers a seizure. Birch lends support to a pregnant girl. Dr. Shutt is audited by the IRS and gets an unpleasant surprise.
| 13 | 13 | "Small Sacrifices" | David Hugh Jones | David E. Kelley | January 23, 1995 | 2M12 | 21.6 |
Dr. Infante reattaches a digit severed from the hand of a flutist. A former patient brings suit against the hospital and its doctors, and recruits some out of town help. A mysterious young man helps out in the ER. Note: Fyvush Finkel (Douglas Wambaugh) makes a crossover appearance as his Picket Fences character. He had previously traveled to Chicago in "Rebels with Causes".
| 14 | 14 | "Cutting Edges" | Mark Tinker | David E. Kelley, Dennis Cooper, & Toni Graphia | February 6, 1995 | 2M13 | 18.7 |
Laurie has a big surprise for Jeffrey. An inner-city doctor suspects his teenage patient (Elise Neal) may have breast cancer.
| 15 | 15 | "Life Support" | Lou Antonio | T : David E. Kelley; S/T : John Tinker | February 13, 1995 | 2M14 | 17.0 |
Dr. Geiger faces a volatile situation when a donor heart he tabbed for one of his patients is redirected to one of Hancock's. Dr. Shutt and Camille work to remove high-tech bullets from a cop that might explode at any minute.
| 16 | 16 | "Freeze Outs" | Dennis Dugan | David E. Kelley & Dennis Cooper | February 20, 1995 | 2M15 | 16.2 |
The doctors race to save a boy who was submerged in icy waters for over three hours. An AIDS patient fights for his life and Dr. Infante has a startling request for Dr. Geiger.
| 17 | 17 | "Growth Pains" | Thomas Schlamme | David E. Kelley | February 27, 1995 | 2M16 | 20.0 |
An explosion sends a dry cleaner to the ER. Dr. Kadalski is pressured to change his unorthodox methods when he treats a man who compulsively pulls out his hair. A fearful Birch lets off steam at Jeffrey as baby Alicia's condition worsens.
| 18 | 18 | "Informed Consent" | Bill D'Elia | S : Kim Newton; T : John Tinker & Dennis Cooper; S/T : David E. Kelley | March 13, 1995 | 2M17 | 19.0 |
Birch goes to court when Dr. Hancock is dropped from an HMO's list of providers. Shutt and Geiger offer to perform two experimental procedures simultaneously to save an elderly patient. Dr. Kronk finds out that his new girlfriend has been keeping an important fact about herself a secret.
| 19 | 19 | "Internal Affairs" | Michael Dinner | S : Wayne W. Grady; S/T : David E. Kelley | March 20, 1995 | 2M18 | 19.5 |
Dr. Kronk uses extreme measures to save a life at an auto accident. Dr. Shutt finds himself on a collision course with Watters when the chief of staff learns of Shutt's plans for treating a man with Parkinson's disease. Dr. Nyland's a mess after presiding over an operation on an old flame that results in the removal of a healthy adrenal gland.
| 20 | 20 | "The Virus" | James C. Hart | S : Thomas M. Heric & Gareth Wootton; T : John Tinker & Dennis Cooper; S/T : David E. Kelley | May 8, 1995 | 2M19 | 15.4 |
A public-health official threatens to close the hospital as staff members race to isolate the source of a deadly bacteria that's invaded the O.R.. A distraught Dr. Infante turns to Dr. Geiger for support.
| 21 | 21 | "Full Moon" | James Frawley | David E. Kelley & Dennis Cooper | May 15, 1995 | 2M20 | 12.2 |
A troubled Dr. Geiger seeks a blessing from his institutionalized ex-wife so he can continue his relationship with Dr. Infante. A dying AIDS patient hopes Hancock can arrange a surgical procedure that would allow him to see one more sunrise.
| 22 | 22 | "Songs from the Cuckoo Birds" | Michael Dinner | David E. Kelley | May 22, 1995 | 2M21 | 17.0 |
After the state suspends his license to practice medicine, Dr. Geiger faces an administrative hearing in which his personal life is scrutinized as never before. And Alan feels slighted when Jeffrey chooses another lawyer to lead his defense.

=== Season 2 (1995–96) ===
| No. overall | No. in season | Title | Directed by | Written by | Original release date | Prod. code | US viewers (millions) |
|---|---|---|---|---|---|---|---|
| 23 | 1 | "Hello Goodbye" | Michael Dinner | David E. Kelley | September 18, 1995 | 3M01 | 18.3 |
Jeffrey is distinctly unpopular with his fellow surgeons in the wake of his psychological problems. Jeffrey operates on one of Hancock's patients. Nyland performs the wrong operation on a patient. Birch offends everyone in his parenting class by offering unsolicited advice. Shutt's father brings a patient to Chicago Hope in the hopes Aaron will operate on her. Dr. Kronk participates in a charity bachelor auction, where he's 'purchased' by Dr. Kate Austin, new CT surgeon at the hospital.
| 24 | 2 | "Rise from the Dead" | Donald Petrie | John Tinker | September 25, 1995 | 3M02 | 16.6 |
The wife of a comatose patient seeks to impregnate herself to preserve her husband's legacy. Nyland squares off against a patient when he refuses to fill her Demerol prescription. An inquisitive Kronk discovers that Nyland is the one who got the patient hooked on the drug in the first place. It's a battle of egos when Geiger meets with Austin. Aaron and Camille mutually agree on divorce. Alicia, Alan's child, has her baptism.
| 25 | 3 | "A Coupla Stiffs" | Jerry London | John Tinker | October 2, 1995 | 3M03 | 16.3 |
Watters causes permanent damage when he participates in a charity boxing match. Diane intervenes when Billy wants to amputate a patient's leg. Dr. Grad suggests sewing maggots into the leg. Aaron and Camille make their divorce final.
| 26 | 4 | "Every Day a Little Death" | James Frawley | Patricia Green | October 9, 1995 | 3M04 | 16.5 |
Kronk and his dog move into Nyland's posh apartment after Billy's place burns down. Yvette White (ep. #2) initially agrees to donate her late son's organs to others, but withdraws her consent when she discovers his heart will go to a Nazi-in-training. Birch finally gets up the nerve to invite Diane to lunch.
| 27 | 5 | "Wild Cards" | Michael Schultz | Sara B. Charno | October 16, 1995 | 3M13 | 17.3 |
Jeffrey becomes even more antagonistic towards Austin, believing she's out to get him. Camille considers heading up a new outpatient program. Birch gets up the nerve to express his feelings to Diane when her old boyfriend shows up. Aaron grapples with his feelings for both Camille and Kate.
| 28 | 6 | "Who Turned Out the Lights?" | Joe Napolitano | John Tinker | October 30, 1995 | 3M05 | 16.0 |
The staff is forced to operate under duress when the lights go out and the building begins leaking. Billy and Maggie team up against Nyland after Danny throws Billy out of his house. New obstetrician John Sutton joins the staff.
| 29 | 7 | "From Soup to Nuts" | Lou Antonio | David E. Kelley, Jennifer Levin, & John Tinker | November 6, 1995 | 3M07 | 16.9 |
Laurie invites Jeffrey, Aaron, and Camille to her wedding, which needs to be held soon due to the minister's impending transfer out of the asylum. Dr. Sutton operates on a fetus. Birch and Watters testify at a hearing on Medicare (United States), but are surprised when they're ambushed by a politically minded senator. Camille displays signs of depression and asks Hancock for sleeping pills.
| 30 | 8 | "Leave of Absence" | Jeremy Kagan | David E. Kelley | November 13, 1995 | 3M08 | 21.4 |
Alan Birch is shot during a mugging while Diane watches. Diane can't control her rage toward the shooter. Camille cares for Alicia while Alan recuperates. Jeffrey begins to reconsider his priorities after a personal request by Birch. Notes: (1) Last appearance by Peter McNichol. (2) Last appearance by Mandy Patinkin as a series regular until the 6th season. (3) In 1996, this episode won the Emmy for Outstanding Directing in a Drama Series.
| 31 | 9 | "Stand" | Mel Damski | Kevin Arkadie | November 20, 1995 | 3M09 | 17.4 |
Dr. Watters remains 'sick' three days after Birch's death. Alan's sister Marguerite surprises Phillip, striking up an immediate friendship with him. Dr. Austin, the interim 'chief of staff', abuses her power to first stop a procedure, then give it the go-ahead. The unconventional procedure, performed on Multiple Sclerosis patient Joe Springer (Richard Pryor), goes forward. Diane, still suffering from the effects of the shooting, is sent home by Kate. Austin later reveals that she was raped many years ago, trying to let Diane know that she knows what it feels like to be powerless. The new obstetrician throws a 'healing' party to try to help the staff attain closure with Jeffrey. Camille asks Aaron for sleeping pills.
| 32 | 10 | "The Ethics of Hope" | Michael W. Watkins | David E. Kelley | November 27, 1995 | 3M10 | 19.4 |
Dr. Austin is to blame when she inadvertently leaves a clamp inside a patient that later dies. Kate struggles over the dilemma of whether to stay silent and protect both herself and the hospital, or tell the patient's parents. Billy and Danny search for a street 'doctor', after one of his patients is brought in with severe internal damage. Dr. Grad successfully inoculates an ape with the AIDS virus using a vaccine she created. Judge Harold Aldrich is temporarily hired as Birch's replacement. Camille asks Nyland to write her a prescription for sleeping pills.
| 33 | 11 | "Christmas Truce" | James C. Hart | Kevin Arkadie | December 11, 1995 | 3M11 | 17.7 |
Nyland and Hancock deliver a Christmas present to Ricky Jackson for Kronk. Gunfire erupts while they're in the apartment, forcing the doctors to stay until the gunfire abates. While there, Nyland does his best to save a man impaled on a pipe, while Dennis braves bullets to bring in medical assistance. Diane worries that she might have contracted HIV from Bam-Bam, a laboratory animal. Camille is brought in after suffering a seizure while dancing. Billy treats a high-school baseball phenom with possible colon cancer.
| 34 | 12 | "Transplanted Affection" | Michael Dinner | David E. Kelley | January 8, 1996 | 3M12 | 21.2 |
Kate's ex-husband, Tommy Wilmette, sues for custody of Sara. A possible heart transplant comes to the hospital. With Austin tied up in court, Nyland 0–1 in transplants (ep #9), and Kronk inexperienced, Phillip calls Jeffrey in to perform the transplant. Jeffrey's titanic ego meets its match in Wilmette's. The new OB brings in a 'hidden patient', a woman six months brain dead, kept alive to deliver her unborn child.
| 35 | 13 | "Three Men and a Lady" | Thomas Schlamme | John Tinker | January 15, 1996 | 3M06 | 18.8 |
Aldrich begins acting bizarrely, leading the staff to conduct a series of tests to figure out what's wrong. Nyland's 'love of his life', Nurse Amy Peletier, comes back into his life and disrupts Camille with her radically different ideas.
| 36 | 14 | "Right to Life" | Adam Arkin | Patricia Green | January 22, 1996 | 3M14 | 19.3 |
Dennis is vilified by the media when he performs an abortion to save a mother's life. The mother sues, despite the fact that she gave consent, plus the fact that the child was already dead. Dr. Kronk treats a female impersonator suffering from AIDS. Nyland has his hands full with an abandoned six-year-old.
| 37 | 15 | "Hearts and Minds" | Martin Davidson | John Tinker | February 5, 1996 | 3M15 | 17.3 |
Aaron and psychiatrist Bix Konstadt plan to operate on a young boy with obsessive compulsive disorder in an attempt to cure him. Aaron worries when Bix admits she's a manic depressive off her medication. Watters, Nyland and Kronk have their hands full with a woman who may have been abducted by aliens. Heart transplant recipient Henry Alden (#34) is brought in complaining of pain. Alden insists on speaking to Robert Malzone, the husband of the woman who donated the heart.
| 38 | 16 | "Women on the Verge" | Rodman Flender | S : Jessie Nelson; S/T : John Tinker | February 12, 1996 | 3M16 | 17.7 |
Annie Rueman (#18) comes back into Billy's life. Annie is worried that her estrogen pills aren't working. Kate treats a young man with a crush on her. Aaron and Bix present their proposed operation for Eric to the board, sending a very agitated Bix into a depressed state.
| 39 | 17 | "Life Lines" | Dennie Gordon | Jennifer Levin & Sara B. Charno | February 26, 1996 | 3M17 | 16.7 |
Bix is reduced to a mere shell of herself without her lithium. Aaron goes ahead with the procedure on Eric Dipretto. Kronk files a sexual harassment suit against Austin after she bullies him yet again. Nyland and Billy try to perform an intestinal transplant against Austin's and Watter's wishes. Dr. Austin campaigns for head of surgery.
| 40 | 18 | "Sexual Perversity" | Bill D'Elia | Jennifer Levin & Sara B. Charno | March 11, 1996 | 3M18 | 17.2 |
Four stories of sexuality make up the plot of this episode. Camille comforts a rape victim while Austin, who is a colleague of the accused rapist, refuses to believe the alleged victim. Billy and Diane counsel a newlywed couple on the best ways to engage themselves in bed. Sutton is in disbelief when he discovers Dennis has been tolerating a 30-year-old dating and living with a 14-year-old. Finally, Shutt is the victim of mistaken identity when a 3rd year resident mistakenly assumes Shutt is gay.
| 41 | 19 | "Sweet Surrender" | Michael Engler | Mary A. Byrd | March 18, 1996 | 3M19 | 15.6 |
Kronk and Grad wake up in bed together. Diane finds out about Kronk's night with Kate. Dr. Watters treats a young girl suffering from kidney damage. Watters tries to bring her feuding parents together to help her psyche. Kate discovers her ex-husband plans to move to Boston with Sara. Camille invites Dennis on a date.
| 42 | 20 | "The Parent Rap" | Arvin Brown | Kevin Arkadie, Sara B. Charmo, & Jennifer Levin | April 29, 1996 | 3M20 | 12.9 |
Dr. Austin struggles to make her father, a Christian Scientist, listen to reason when he refuses to let her operate on his heart. Aaron grapples with his feelings toward his father in the wake of his death. Meanwhile, Dr. Sutton delivers a child of indeterminate gender, forcing the infant's parents to make a difficult decision. Jeffrey Geiger provides comic relief, returning as a member of a performing clown troupe.
| 43 | 21 | "Quiet Riot" | Randy Roberts | Peter Berg | May 6, 1996 | 3M21 | 15.3 |
Dr. Geiger and his clown troupe entertain injured children. Ricky Jackson, Billy's ghetto protege, visits the ER for a look at real medicine. A psychotic, abusive, insane family of four pays a visit to the ER when a session with their therapist really goes bad.
| 44 | 22 | "Ex Marks the Spot" | Michael W. Watkins | Kevin Arkadie & Patricia Green | May 13, 1996 | 3M22 | 14.7 |
Dr. Sutton is shocked when his three ex-wives arrive at the same time, two of him tell him they're lovers, the other is admitted to the ER. Austin pursues the chief of surgery office with zeal. Hancock's sister comes in after being beaten by her husband. Danny Nyland hits on the fiancée of a wealthy patient.
| 45 | 23 | "Last One Out, Get the Lights" | Bill D'Elia | S : Thomas M. Heric; S/T : John Tinker | May 20, 1996 | 3M23 | 15.9 |
Kate is incensed when her ex-husband, Tommy Wilmette, announces plans to buy the hospital. Danny treads thin ice when he continues his relationship with Valerie. Kate tries to convince wealthy patient Jack Calverton to buy Chicago Hope before Wilmette does. Hancock's brother-in-law visits his battered wife, taunting Dennis.

=== Season 3 (1996–97) ===
| No. overall | No. in season | Title | Directed by | Written by | Original release date | Prod. code | US viewers (millions) |
|---|---|---|---|---|---|---|---|
| 46 | 1 | "Out of Africa (1)" | Bill D'Elia | John Tinker | September 16, 1996 | 4M01 | 16.7 |
Nyland returns from his vacation with Valerie to find he's been suspended and replaced as chief of trauma by Dr. Keith Wilkes. Kate comes back from New Zealand facing both kidnapping charges and a suspension. A new group of interns comes into the hospital, eager to change things. Uncertainty hangs in the air over the future of the hospital when Tommy Wilmette considers drastic cuts. Billy and Diane work in a Maasai village in Africa. Aaron and Phillip clash when Aaron becomes 'buddy buddy' with Wilmette.
| 47 | 2 | "Back to the Future (2)" | Bill D'Elia | John Tinker | September 23, 1996 | 4M02 | 15.1 |
Phillip travels to Wyoming to recruit Jack McNeil, an orthopedic surgeon. McNeil refuses, for reasons unknown. McNeil is haunted from memories of the Oklahoma City bombing. New trauma chief Keith Wilkes is in hot water after he removes narcotics from a patient's intestine and flushes them. Grad returns from Africa and is offered a general practitioner position. Dr. Austin cares for her dying father. Ron Silver continues to appear.
| 48 | 3 | "Papa's Got a Brand New Bag" | Lou Antonio | Dawn Prestwich & Nicole Yorkin | September 30, 1996 | 4M03 | 14.6 |
Aaron and Dr. McNeil clash when the two have conflicting ideas for a patient's treatment. Diane struggles with the transition from animal research to treating patients when she has a needy patient. Kate is car-jacked, loses her father's ashes, and gets on Tommy's bad side again.
| 49 | 4 | "Liver Let Die" | Adam Arkin | S : Linda Klein; S/T : John Tinker | October 7, 1996 | 4M04 | 15.1 |
Dr. Watters treats a mother with a mystifying liver ailment. Nyland and Austin return to the hospital for suspension hearings. Dr. Shutt begins to fear he's attracted to his male research assistant (ep. #40). Dennis and McNeil treat an aspiring Olympic cyclist with pain in her knees.
| 50 | 5 | "Liar, Liar" | Stephen Cragg | Jennifer Levin | October 14, 1996 | 4M05 | 14.3 |
Life is tough for the senior doctors, with Shutt being treated like a second class citizen in the hospital and Austin learning she's been reinstated but with a substantial pay cut, a different title, and a much smaller office. Aaron tries to develop his shunt, with input from new resident Dr. Carr. Jack treats an elderly man who tries to set McNeil's priorities straight. The hospital hires a publicist to create a promotional video, which in the end, seems vaguely familiar.
| 51 | 6 | "Higher Powers" | Oz Scott | David Amann | October 21, 1996 | 4M06 | 17.05 |
Billy returns from Africa, leaving the peaceful Maasai for America's turbulence. Billy is threatened by a 12-year-old after his drug-dealing brother, under Billy's care, dies. Austin faces the impact of her actions when she and her co-workers are sued in the Harrod death (ep #32). Aaron finds himself uneasy about an upcoming date with physical therapist Karen Wilder.
| 52 | 7 | "A Time to Kill" | James Frawley | Tim Kring | November 4, 1996 | 4M07 | 14.3 |
Nyland treats an amnesiac who wanders away and is mistaken by Phillip for an old medical student. Aaron operates on a death row inmate who begs Aaron to kill him on the table, dying before the state has a chance to execute him. McNeil suspects an old girlfriend of abusing her mother.
| 53 | 8 | "A Day in the Life" | Bill D'Elia | Sara B. Charno | November 11, 1996 | 4M08 | 14.4 |
A potentially brain-dead donor comes into the ER. With doctors from all over Chicago waiting, the body is first declared brain-dead, then after a re-examination they find he's only in a coma. The doctors bicker over what to do.
| 54 | 9 | "Divided Loyalty" | Michael Schultz | Ian Biederman | November 18, 1996 | 4M09 | 14.4 |
Dr. Wilkes takes flak from Dennis for not giving back to his community. Billy has a tough decision to make when a childhood friend show up at his apartment in the early morning hours with a bullet in him. Diane believes Billy's friend may have been involved in a savage beating.
| 55 | 10 | "V-Fibbing" | Sandy Smolan | Josh Reims | November 25, 1996 | 4M10 | 15.73 |
Kate is faced with a dilemma when an Asian patient is diagnosed with cancer, yet her family requests the patient not be informed to save face. First year resident Underhill has his own decision when he discovers distressing news about a patient's husband. Dr. McNeil treats a jockey suffering from back pain, which leads to a personal crisis when he's tempted to re-enter the world of gambling.
| 56 | 11 | "Mummy Dearest" | Martha Mitchell | Dawn Prestwich & Nicole Yorkin | December 9, 1996 | 4M11 | 14.7 |
Jack, re-energized by his descent into gambling, performs a daring procedure, attaching a man's left hand onto his right arm. Aaron treats a man who, after surgery, completely forgets the last ten years of his life and speaks in loving terms about his now ex-wife. Aaron loses his cool when his car is stalked by an irate man who feels Aaron personally wronged him by inadvertently parking too close to his van. Diane examines a mummy.
| 57 | 12 | "Split Decisions" | Randy Zisk | Jennifer Levin | January 6, 1997 | 4M12 | 14.81 |
Dr. Wilkes copes with personal and professional problems as he tries to reach a compromise with his wife regarding an unexpected pregnancy while trying to convince a suicidal patient he pulled out of the river that a crippling operation is his only chance for life. Aaron takes revenge against a deadbeat debtor by taking his money's worth from the patient's clothing store. Dr. Austin falls for a visiting dignitary.
| 58 | 13 | "Verdicts" | James C. Hart | David Amann | January 13, 1997 | 4M13 | 14.86 |
The trial of Hancock's brother-in-law gets underway, with Dennis still unsure of how his sister will testify. Rumors about Phillip's personal life fly through the hospital after Maggie overhears an intimate conversation. Dr. Austin tries to save one of two children, both victims of a hit and run. Dr. McNeil decides to quit gambling. Aaron screws up his courage and decides to ask Maricela on a date.
| 59 | 14 | "The Day of the Rope" | Stephen Cragg | Peter Berg, Kevin Ward, & John Tinker | January 20, 1997 | 4M25 | 15.17 |
Billy and Diane are caught in the middle of a hostage situation after two revolutionaries shoot up a political convention. Dr. Kronk risks his life to treat a wounded rebel, while the other criminals grow increasingly tense.
| 60 | 15 | "Take My Wife, Please" | Lou Antonio | S : Sara B. Charno & Josh Reims; T : Tim Kring & Ian Biederman | February 3, 1997 | 4M14 | 14.63 |
Aaron reunites with an old friend, David, who has only a few months left to live. His friend suggests Aaron marry his wife, who married David over Aaron, after David dies. Aaron gets drunk and runs into (imagines?) Jeffrey. Wilkes doubts his wife when she claims to have had a miscarriage. Wilkes and Nyland's feud escalates after a patient dies. Jack refuses to listen to Phillip when he offers to help Jack overcome his gambling problem, but later asks Karen Wilder to help him. Aaron tries to figure out what to do about Maricela.
| 61 | 16 | "Missed Conception (1)" | Michael Pressman | Marcelle Clements | February 10, 1997 | 4M15 | 14.57 |
Kate's friend, feminist professor Marina, tries desperately to 'get pregnant' but has to work against, rather than with, her husband. Aaron works against Tommy Wilmette in an attempt to get his friend, David, approved for a controversial gene therapy treatment. Diane tries to get marijuana for an ill patient.
| 62 | 17 | "Mother, May I? (2)" | Bill D'Elia | Marcelle Clements | February 17, 1997 | 4M16 | 13.85 |
Kate and Tommy travel to Washington D.C. to speak out on Health Care Reform. Marina arranges to adopt the child of a pregnant teenager. Jack treats the incredibly annoying woman from ep #52.
| 63 | 18 | "Growing Pains" | Jim Charleston | Sara B. Charno | March 10, 1997 | 4M17 | 13.91 |
Phillip and Aaron present their plan to buy Chicago Hope to the staff, where it's met with resounding complaints. Aaron tries to define his relationship with Maricela. The ER treats a patient with numerous psychosomatic ailments. Kronk gets in trouble when he performs a lung reduction operation, a procedure vetoed by the patient's HMO. Billy visits the patient's HMO representative, the 'freaky' Jonathan Saunders, to straighten things out.
| 64 | 19 | "The Son Also Rises" | James R. Bagdonas | Tim Kring | March 17, 1997 | 4M18 | 14.73 |
Aaron receives a shock when a renowned Hungarian sculptor claims to be his father. Phillip, spurred by Aaron's reunion with his father, visits his son Michael only to be rebuffed. Watters is later carjacked. Phillip and Michael work together to save an injured gang member. Dr. Austin treats an 11-year-old genius.
| 65 | 20 | "Second Chances" | Jesus Salvador Trevino | Ian Biederman | April 7, 1997 | 4M19 | 14.85 |
The whole staff comes together when Danny Nyland is horribly injured in a car accident. Austin tries to get a heart transplant for a Pulitzer Prize winning author who's already received, and abused, a heart transplant. Jack falls deeper into gambling.
| 66 | 21 | "Positive I.D.'s" | James C. Hart | Jennifer Levin & David Amann | April 13, 1997 | 4M20 | 13.86 |
Nyland, fresh off his injury leave, puts all his energy into identifying an assault victim. Billy has qualms when a patient who tested positive for the breast cancer gene asks him to perform a preventive double mastectomy. Kate tries to get Sara into an exclusive school. Diane proposes to Billy.
| 67 | 22 | "Leggo My Ego" | Lou Antonio | S : Josh Reims; T : Sara B. Charno, Nicole Yorkin, & Dawn Prestwich | April 21, 1997 | 4M21 | 13.11 |
The hospital endures Kate's massive ego when she's followed by a newspaper reporter. Jack tries to save a dying child against the parent's explicit wishes and later falls deeply into debt. Both Billy and Diane have second thoughts about their engagement.
| 68 | 23 | "Colonel of Truth" | Peter Berg | S : Jennifer Levin & Mary A. Byrd; T : Tim Kring & Robert Burgos | April 28, 1997 | 4M22 | 14.81 |
Watters is reunited with his Vietnam C.O. when the colonel is admitted suffering from rheumatoid arthritis. Phillip is baffled by the colonel's refusal to accept treatment. Kate has her hands full when Sara is traumatized by the accidental death of a Little League teammate. Wilkes and Nyland have a role reversal, with Danny staying calm and serene and Wilkes acting the hothead, over Ricky Jackson's use of ER supplies.
| 69 | 24 | "Lamb to the Slaughter" | Bill D'Elia | S : Zachary Martin; T : Alicia Martin; S/T : John Tinker | May 5, 1997 | 4M26 | 13.32 |
Assistant State's Attorney Charles Lamb interviews Chicago Hope staffers Wilkes, Nyland, McNeil, and Watters to determine responsibility in the death of a patient.
| 70 | 25 | "Love on the Rocks" | Stephen Cragg | S : Josh Reims & Robert Burgos; T : Ian Biederman & David Amann | May 12, 1997 | 4M23 | 15.35 |
Jack has his hands full with two of Karen's patients, Harriet Owens, who hasn't moved out of his house yet, and the delusional Luke Sarison, who believes McNeil is his father. Aaron and Kate vie for chief of surgery. Phillip is invited to join his latest girlfriend, Emma, when she moves to Paris. Danny Nyland is arrested for the Jessup death, and subsequently transferred from the ER to the blood bank.
| 71 | 26 | "Hope Against Hope" | Bill D'Elia | S : Joe Blake; T : Alicia Martin; S/T : John Tinker | May 19, 1997 | 4M24 | 14.32 |
Jeffrey Geiger returns, bearing the news that he's a partner in the newly formed Hope Health Care. Kate bears with Jeffrey's advice in a critical heart transplant operation. Wilkes takes a wild helicopter ride to fetch the donor heart. Dr. Kronk tries to find a solution for his Alzheimer's afflicted father. McNeil and Shutt pontificate about life and religion following a patient's claim that she was healed by a vision of the virgin mother.

=== Season 4 (1997–98) ===
| No. overall | No. in season | Title | Directed by | Written by | Original release date | Prod. code | US viewers (millions) |
|---|---|---|---|---|---|---|---|
| 72 | 1 | "Guns N' Roses" | Bill D'Elia | John Tinker | October 1, 1997 | 5M01 | 14.54 |
Watters' old romantic rival checks into the hospital in need of a heart transplant. When a heart finally arrives, Austin performs the transplant against her will, believing that the wealthy patient bribed the donor family. Aaron and McNeil work together to help a man with a rare disease that is causing his muscles to contract. Wilkes is affected when a gang member shoots up the ER. Billy officially asks Diane to marry him. It's mentioned that Nyland is gone.
| 73 | 2 | "The Incredible Adventures of Baron Von Munchausen... by Proxy" | Stephen Cragg | Tim Kring | October 8, 1997 | 5M02 | 11.58 |
Billy removes the kidney of a 9-year-old girl with an extensive medical history, and discovers signs that she's being abused. He suspects the girl's mother may be intentionally harming her daughter to grab attention. Aaron grapples with himself when he loses a patient while performing a simple procedure. Kate can't break away from the hospital to attend her daughter's school carnival. Jack gets caught in a sting at Bart's bar, prompting Phillip to insist that Jack enroll in Gamblers Anonymous.
| 74 | 3 | "Brain Salad Surgery" | Bill D'Elia | Dawn Prestwich & Nicole Yorkin | October 15, 1997 | 5M03 | 14.17 |
Aaron announces he's leaving Chicago Hope for a teaching position at Harvard. Shortly thereafter he begins to suffer from a brain aneurysm. The aneurysm sends him into a trance state where he hallucinates several strange fantastical experiences, including Chicago Hope doctors in song and dance sketches and Jeffrey Geiger's advice on life.
| 75 | 4 | "Sympathy for the Devil" | Lou Antonio | Jennifer Levin | October 22, 1997 | 5M04 | 13.34 |
The staff worries about Aaron when he has a series of seizures, threatening his chances to survive another operation. Jack refuses to allow a drug addict to go through a super fast detox program, using the knowledge he's gleaned from his attempts to beat gambling. A child molester asks Billy to castrate him.
| 76 | 5 | "...And the Hand Played On" | James C. Hart | S : Tim Kring, Dawn Prestwich & Nicole Yorkin; T : Barbara Hall | October 29, 1997 | 5M05 | 12.08 |
Dr. Shutt may have brain damage after his aneurysm, so a new neurosurgeon, Dr. Lisa Catera, is brought into the hospital. Dr. Austin gets trapped on an elevator with a sexy electrician.
| 77 | 6 | "The Lung and the Restless" | David Semel | Ian Biederman & Barbara Hall | November 5, 1997 | 5M06 | 13.59 |
Austin struggles when a girl with Down's Syndrome offers to donate a lung to her needy brother. Dennis surprises a benefactor with the news that one of his relatives was black. Dr. Grad discovers that she's pregnant, just as Billy announces plans to take a four-month sabbatical.
| 78 | 7 | "White Trash" | Jesús Salvador Treviño | Josh Reims | November 12, 1997 | 5M07 | 12.92 |
Billy and Diane are married as Billy rushes off to South America. Diane is horrified by a teenage girl who dumped her newborn child into the trash. Dr. Austin treats a high school basketball player with a bad heart who's reluctant to quit the game. While trying to counsel a male rape victim, Aaron becomes intrigued with the mechanics of the brain. Kate connects with electrician Danny Blaines, but remains reluctant to be seen with him in public.
| 79 | 8 | "Winging It" | Oz Scott | Nicole Yorkin & Dawn Prestwich | November 19, 1997 | 5M08 | 12.22 |
Jack and Kate operate at 20,000 feet on a pregnant woman while the two are flying to a medical conference in London. Aaron begins his psychiatric residency, getting off to a bad start with his teacher and falling prey to his patients' manipulative disorders.
| 80 | 9 | "Cabin Fever" | Kristoffer Tabori | Barbara Hall | November 26, 1997 | 5M09 | 13.22 |
A 'girls only' weekend getaway at McNeil's cabin goes horribly wrong for Kate, Lisa and Diane, when Diane is assaulted by a native backwoodsman. The three doctors deal with the attack differently. Kate, still affected by an attack in her college days, responds with anger. Lisa remains cool and rational while Diane is paralyzed with fear.
| 81 | 10 | "All in the Family" | Lou Antonio | David Amann | December 10, 1997 | 5M10 | 12.00 |
Dr. Shutt counsels the family of a teenage suicide. McNeil and Hancock try to determine whether a young patient is the victim of parental abuse. Wilkes refuses to treat his absentee father after he's admitted to the hospital. Phillip, stinging from repeated rejections from his son, urges father and son to reconcile.
| 82 | 11 | "On Golden Pons" | James Bagdonas | Ian Biederman | December 17, 1997 | 5M12 | 12.32 |
Phillip is disturbed to learn that his accountant has stolen every cent he owns. Watters' pride doesn't let him accept offers to help from both Jack and Aaron. Shutt and Dr. Catera clash over a patient's suggested treatment. Keith is arrested for drunk driving and is sentenced to community service work at Hancock's clinic. Diane's loneliness sinks her Holiday spirits. Jack plays Santa for sick children.
| 83 | 12 | "Broken Hearts" | Sandy Smolan | Joshua Stern | January 7, 1998 | 5M11 | 12.34 |
Phillip reconnects with an old flame when her son is hospitalized. Jack decides to pursue a relationship with Lisa, dumping Karen Wilder. Diane is busy with a patient who insists she's pregnant despite evidence to the contrary.
| 84 | 13 | "Memento Mori" | Michael Schultz | Tim Kring | January 14, 1998 | 5M13 | 13.44 |
Chicago Hope's doctors struggle with adversity when the power goes out on a blustery, winter night. Keith endures a drunken Irish engineer to try to get a backup generator on-line. Dr. McNeil tries to explain life and death to Sara Wilmette and Cacaci's son when they're trapped in an elevator together. Aaron strives to help a teenage girl found bleeding from her hands in a church. Billy contends with a pregnant (and hormonal) Diane. Kate doubts herself when a very expensive computer program disagrees with her diagnosis.
| 85 | 14 | "Psychodrama" | Patrick Norris | Jennifer Levin | January 21, 1998 | 5M14 | 10.87 |
Phillip, temporarily hobbled with a leg injury, spies a murder through his telescope and tries vainly to convince police he really witnessed a killing. Danny Blaines gives Kate a bird that gets loose and flies throughout the hospital. Diane locates her birth mother and visits her.
| 86 | 15 | "The Ties That Bind" | John Heath | Story by : Beth Glazer McLaughlin; Teleplay by : Dawn Prestwich & Nicole Yorkin | February 4, 1998 | 5M15 | 12.49 |
Diane faces her impending motherhood full of doubts, inspired by an HIV-positive patient who wants to have a child, and the discovery of a mass in her breast. Wilkes and Hancock are swamped with a pregnant teenager who's handcuffed to her abrasive mother. Dr. Catera attempts to remove half of a five-year-old's brain to stop her seizures.
| 87 | 16 | "The Things We Do for Love" | Christine Lahti | Lyla M. Oliver | March 4, 1998 | 4ABM16 | 11.28 |
Phillip decides to take a stab at open-mike comedy, to his colleagues horror. Lisa finds herself attracted to Jack's incarcerated brother. Austin and Sara dine with Danny Blaines, leading to a violent confrontation. Billy, worried that his impending fatherhood has made him weak, gets into a midnight bar fight.
| 88 | 17 | "Liver, Hold the Mushrooms" | Kenny Ortega | Remi Aubuchon & Josh Reims | March 11, 1998 | 4ABM18 | 11.02 |
Billy treats a family with damaged livers via poisonous mushrooms. The father, the only unaffected family member, must choose which of his two sons will receive part of his liver. Aaron sees a troubled patient who, through hypnotherapy, claims she was sexually abused by her father. Phillip forces Kate to attend a touchy-feely medical conference with Cacaci. Billy gets he and Diane thrown out of Lamaze class. Diane debates whether to tell Billy what really happened at Jack's cabin.
| 89 | 18 | "Waging Bull" | Bill D'Elia | Kerry Lenhart & John J. Sakmar | March 18, 1998 | 4ABM17 | 11.49 |
Phillip, Jack, Aaron, and Keith travel to Las Vegas for a medical conference. Jack, confident he's beaten his gambling addiction, runs into an old friend, the father of a boxer. The boxer dies, sending Jack spiraling downward, culminating in another descent into gambling.
| 90 | 19 | "Objects are Closer Than They Appear" | Frank DePalma | David Amann | March 25, 1998 | 4ABM19 | 12.72 |
Dr. Wilkes treats identical teenagers with the same rare heart ailment, losing one in the process. Kate treats a 10-year-old who nearly died after sniffing glue, and learns her daughter does the same. Aaron interviews a man for inclusion in a study by Dr. Frank. Diane debates taking maternity leave. McNeil isn't sure whether a man has sentiment or politics at heart when he insists life-saving surgery be taken on his sister, over her same-gender partner's wishes.
| 91 | 20 | "Deliverance" | Rob Corn | Nicole Yorkin & Dawn Prestwich | April 1, 1998 | 4ABM20 | 11.45 |
Diane, several weeks overdue, finally goes into labor. Wilkes tries to keep an abusive man away from his family by admitting him for back pain and doping him up. Jack and Lisa take a ballroom dance class.
| 92 | 21 | "Bridge over Troubled Watters" | Patrick Norris | Remi Aubuchon | April 8, 1998 | 4ABM21 | 11.62 |
Phillip searches for answers after his son is shot in the head and dies. Jack continues his pursuit of Lisa. Sara Wilmette meets a young cancer patient.
| 93 | 22 | "Risky Business: Part 1" | Martha Mitchell | Lori Mozilo & Christine Ecklund | April 29, 1998 | 4ABM22 | 11.76 |
Aaron supervises a famous painter when she's admitted with a brain tumor. Dennis treats a young boy who believes himself to be a girl. Dr. Wilder clashes with Kate over the proper treatment for an unborn child.
| 94 | 23 | "Absent Without Leave: Part 2" | James C. Hart | David Yorkin | May 6, 1998 | 4ABM23 | 10.51 |
Aaron and Samara vacation in LA, where Aaron learns a valuable lesson about savoring life. Keith clashes with Dennis when a wealthy woman tries to improve urban life by paying for the sterilization of drug addicts. Billy endures a visit from his flighty mother. Phillip tries to produce an audio tape on surgery.
| 95 | 24 | "Physician, Heal Thyself" | Lou Antonio | S : Barbara Hall; S/T : Ian Biederman | May 13, 1998 | 4ABM24 | 12.68 |
Raymond Wilkes is traumatized when he's caught in the middle of gunfire at his school's playground. Keith questions his parental instincts when his first thought is to treat the wounded rather than protect his son. With no one else around, Aaron is forced to cut into a patient to save his life, and does it successfully. Kate and Lisa seek counseling for the cabin incident. Jack makes a commitment to Lisa. Phillip reconnects with Stephanie.

=== Season 5 (1998–99) ===
| No. overall | No. in season | Title | Directed by | Written by | Original release date | Prod. code | US viewers (millions) |
|---|---|---|---|---|---|---|---|
| 96 | 1 | "Sarindipity" | Bill D'Elia | Dawn Prestwich & Nicole Yorkin | September 30, 1998 | 5ABM01 | 13.42 |
Dr. Shutt begins to do surgery again although his future in psychiatry is uncertain. A "suicide doctor" tries to get the hospital transplant committee to use organs that were not harvested properly, and promises one to Austin's patient without her consent. Sarin gas is released in a bank threatening many lives including Hancock's, who risks his own to save others. Wilkes loses it after the incident on the heels of the previous shooting at his son's school, leading him to take a drastic step. Diane returns to work after her maternity leave.
| 97 | 2 | "Austin Space" | Stephen Cragg | Jan Oxenberg | October 7, 1998 | 5ABM02 | 10.20 |
Dr. Shutt continues his work as a psychiatrist, helping a patient who needs to tell his father, who is an Orthodox Rabbi, that he is gay. The "suicide doctor", a friend of Jack's, might need her own services. A cardiologist in NASA's Doctors in Space program, has a heart attack, and Kate wants to take his place.
| 98 | 3 | "Wag the Doc" | James C. Hart | Ian Biederman | October 14, 1998 | 5ABM03 | 11.30 |
Hancock accuses Watters and Austin of racism when they refuse to operate on a black patient. One of Shutt's patients commits suicide when the medicine needed isn't covered by insurance.
| 99 | 4 | "The Breast and the Brightest" | Martha Mitchell | Barbara Hall | October 21, 1998 | 5ABM04 | 10.41 |
Grad accuses a mother of starving her infant to death. Shutt and Catera disagree over a neurological patient. Austin announces her plans with NASA, and Watters takes away her status as Chief of Surgery. Yeats uses his "sixth sense" to diagnose a patient.
| 100 | 5 | "One Hundred and One Damnations" | Michael Pressman | Barbara Hall & John Tinker | October 28, 1998 | 5ABM06 | 10.63 |
The hospital prepares for the Doctor of the Year party, and several old friends drop by. Watters goes into a virus-induced coma and gets some words of wisdom from Alan Birch. Camille Shutt returns for the party and Aaron discovers he still has feelings for her. Dr. Nyland returns to the hospital and reveals that he has really changed his life. Geiger also visits the hospital.
| 101 | 6 | "Viagra-Vated Assault" | Rob Corn | Josh Reims | November 4, 1998 | 5ABM05 | 10.42 |
Several doctors make questionable decisions, including Jack ignoring his promise to a patient to not give him a blood transfusion, with serious consequences. Aaron's treatment of a musician who is his hero, and who fears his creativity may be stifled by taking medication prescribed for his bipolar disorder. Keith's behavior towards Cacaci's son, who drives the staff crazy as he "supervises" the ER, behaving exactly like his father.
| 102 | 7 | "Austin, We Have a Problem" | Lou Antonio | Remi Aubuchon | November 11, 1998 | 5ABM07 | 10.27 |
Gordon teaches Kate how to fly. Hancock accuses a police officer of shooting a homeless African-American. Keith's son starts having breathing problems, and Diane believes that it is related to stress from the school shooting.
| 103 | 8 | "The Other Cheek" | Bill D'Elia | Ellen Herman | November 18, 1998 | 5ABM08 | 9.63 |
A TV star dies in the ER when a needle bursts his gluteal implant, causing cardiac arrest. News crews invade the hospital to cover the story.
| 104 | 9 | "Tantric Turkey" | John Heath | David Yorkin | November 25, 1998 | 5ABM09 | 11.45 |
Diane is obsessing about having an elaborate gourmet Thanksgiving celebration, when Billy's mother shows up ready to give birth. The delusional star of the road company of "Jesus Christ Superstar", is brought to the ER when he falls ill. The reincarnated spiritual leader of Dr. Yeats is brought to the hospital with chest pains.
| 105 | 10 | "Gun with the Wind" | Sandy Smolan | Linda Loiselle Guzik | December 9, 1998 | 5ABM10 | 10.11 |
Wilkes must face the parents of a child brought into the ER when it becomes clear that Raymond was responsible for the child's injury. NASA interviews Kate's colleagues. One of Aaron's patients is attracted to him.
| 106 | 11 | "McNeil and Pray" | James Bagdonas | Stephen Beck | December 16, 1998 | 5ABM11 | 10.00 |
A girl on the basketball team which Jack coaches sustains a serious injury during a game, leaving him to feel guilty. Drs. Austin and Yeats work together on a case of a man with heart disease and Alzheimer's, and disagree on a course of treatment that causes Kate a lot of agitation. Keith reluctantly agrees to let his son see Aaron to talk about the shooting, but is actively hostile to therapy for either of them. Dr. Catera's assistant tries to spread holiday cheer a little too vigorously.
| 107 | 12 | "Adventures in Babysitting" | James C. Hart | Ian Biederman | January 13, 1999 | 5ABM12 | 10.30 |
Aaron struggles with the loss of a patient. Billy is attracted to Emily's babysitter. A couple asks Bobby and Dennis for help in creating a baby with a genius I.Q. Joe tries to decide who should go into the hospital's fallout shelter in an emergency.
| 108 | 13 | "Karmic Relief" | Adam Arkin | Barbara Hall | January 20, 1999 | 5ABM13 | 10.40 |
Kate learns that she has an ovarian cyst, which could ruin her plans to fly with NASA. To help her deal with the stress about it, she agrees to go on a Yoga retreat with Bobby. Sara nominates Jack to be her babysitter for the weekend, but she takes something he says too literally when he tries to alleviate her fears about her mother going to space, with dire consequences.
| 109 | 14 | "Playing Through" | Kenny Ortega | Story by : Beth Glazer McLaughlin; Teleplay by : Nicole Yorkin & Dawn Prestwich | February 3, 1999 | 5ABM14 | 10.35 |
During a C-section on Diane's HIV+ friend, she cuts herself and is exposed to the virus. Jack works through his hurt when he sees Lisa and Bobby kissing by playing golf through the hospital. A homeless woman harasses a sick Yeats outside his apartment, and he can't get any sleep. The entire team works furiously to save an unidentified man who has been hit by a train saving a child.
| 110 | 15 | "Big Hand for the Little Lady" | Rob Corn | Jan Oxenberg | February 10, 1999 | 5ABM15 | 9.92 |
When a woman loses her hand, and her mother loses her life in a car accident, McNeil wants to perform a hand transplant from mother to daughter. Kate gets a shuttle assignment from NASA. A childhood friend of Phillip's visits him and asks for one of his kidneys.
| 111 | 16 | "Home Is Where the Heartache Is" | Oz Scott | Josh Reims | February 17, 1999 | 5ABM16 | 9.16 |
Jack returns home to his abusive father after his brother's death. Billy's friend comes to the hospital for a heart transplant, and ends up getting an experimental procedure after the hospital receives the wrong organ. Fearing the impact of HMOs on his practice, Joe begins to sell Doorway products.
| 112 | 17 | "A Goy and His Dog" | Richard Gershman | Remi Aubuchon | March 10, 1999 | 5ABM17 | 9.59 |
Billy ponders euthanasia when his dog Gordy is diagnosed with kidney failure. Lisa tries to help a woman with metastatic breast cancer get into an experimental group even though the woman doesn't fit the study parameters. Aaron's patient confesses to murder.
| 113 | 18 | "Teacher's Pet" | John Heath | Ian Biederman | March 24, 1999 | 5ABM18 | 8.45 |
Kate confronts a world-renowned surgeon who's harassed her in the past. Keith has to face his prejudice against fat people when he treats an obese patient. Diane and Billy are waiting for the results of her HIV test. Diane's patient has a flesh-eating bacterial infection.
| 114 | 19 | "Vanishing Acts" | Michael Schultz | Ellen Herman | March 31, 1999 | 5ABM19 | 9.02 |
Diane tries to help grieving parents when their three-year-old child dies. As part of an experiment, Aaron is institutionalized. But when the person who arranges it for him has a heart attack, he can't get out.
| 115 | 20 | "From Here to Maternity" | Mark Harmon | Miriam Kazdin | April 14, 1999 | 5ABM20 | 10.08 |
A woman gives birth to twins – one black and one white. Unbeknownst to her, Dr. Austin's patient is improperly anesthetized during surgery, and can hear and feel the pain of the entire procedure. But everyone is more outraged about an insensitive – albeit accurate – remark that she makes, rather than his physical ordeal. While Lisa feels overwhelmed, a 13-year-old genius stalks her, looking for her help and attention.
| 116 | 21 | "And Baby Makes 10" | Martha Mitchell | David T. Levinson | April 21, 1999 | 5ABM21 | 9.47 |
The delivery of 8 babies from one mother prompts debate and consternation about their treatment and their existence. Yeats ends up treating an ailing gorilla. Cacaci threatens Watters' career. Aaron is having difficulty with his depressed dog.
| 117 | 22 | "Kiss of Death" | James Bagdonas | Ellen Herman | April 28, 1999 | 5ABM22 | 9.53 |
Kate rekindles a relationship with an old lover to whom she was married for two days, with surprising results. Dr. Catera tries to treat a pregnant woman with brain cancer in a way that she's still able to deliver her baby. Cacaci forces Aaron to investigate his charge that Phillip had an affair with a patient.
| 118 | 23 | "The Heavens Can Wait" | Stephen Cragg | Story by : Jan Oxenberg & Jim Proser; Teleplay by : Jan Oxenberg | May 17, 1999 | 5ABM23 | 11.72 |
The E.R. is flooded with teenagers poisoned by an unknown psychoactive rave drug. Kate and Sara are hit by a drunk driver, and Kate's injuries ruin her chance at NASA. Phillip's fate is decided.
| 119 | 24 | "Curing Cancer" | Bill D'Elia | David E. Kelley | May 19, 1999 | 5ABM24 | 11.17 |
Aaron consults Dr. Gina Simon, a pediatric neurosurgeon after being presented with a 9-week-old baby suffering from seizures. Jeffrey Geiger returns to the hospital and promptly fires half the staff, whom then sue to get their jobs back.

=== Season 6 (1999–2000) ===
| No. overall | No. in season | Title | Directed by | Written by | Original release date | Prod. code | US viewers (millions) |
|---|---|---|---|---|---|---|---|
| 120 | 1 | "Team Play" | Lou Antonio | David E. Kelley | September 23, 1999 | 6ABM01 | 11.43 |
When a plastic surgeon neglects his patient, Dr. Simon ends up in the position of having to inform the family of his death after what should have been a routine procedure. Jack's priest raises eyebrows when he is genitally mutilated during a mugging and wants additional surgery to regain sexual function. Drs. Hanlon and Watters unsuccessfully tries to get Geiger to perform surgery on a young boy. But when Jeffrey's daughter befriends him, she insists that her dad performs it, without knowing he had previously refused.
| 121 | 2 | "Y'Gotta Have Heart" | Michael Pressman | Gardner Stern | September 30, 1999 | 6ABM02 | 10.96 |
A heart becomes available for transplant, but there are two patients waiting for it, and Drs. Geiger and Watters must choose who will receive it – a potential patron or the hospital's newsstand operator. Jeffrey tries to place Alicia into an exclusive kindergarten class. Aaron tries to hold a welcoming party for the new doctors.
| 122 | 3 | "Oh What a Piece of Work Is Man" | Oz Scott | Marjorie David | October 7, 1999 | 6ABM03 | 11.37 |
A doctor with Tourette's Syndrome is brought to Chicago Hope to operate on an infant with a severe heart defect. A patient comes into the ER with what he claims to be Albert Einstein's brain, and gives it to Dr. Wilkes. A woman is using plastic surgery to make herself look like a Barbie Doll.
| 123 | 4 | "Vigilance and Care" | Mel Damski | Randy Anderson | October 14, 1999 | 6ABM04 | 11.92 |
Dr. McNeil goes to magnificent lengths to save the arm of a young baseball star and is sued when he doesn't succeed. A little girl is brought into the ER after being hit by a car. Although she isn't badly hurt, the situation is complicated because she is unable to communicate at all, and Dr. Shutt has to figure out why. This episode is the first show (excluding documentaries) on U.S. network television to contain the word "shit" in uncensored form.
| 124 | 5 | "Humpty Dumpty" | Peter Levin | Linda McGibney | October 21, 1999 | 6ABM05 | 12.20 |
All of the doctors go to Herculean lengths to fight to save Cacaci's life after he jumps off the roof of the hospital. However, Cacaci's fiancée claims that someone must have pushed him. And when Cacaci's ex-wives show up, they all describe him as the sweetest guy in the world, very different from the Cacaci the doctors know.
| 125 | 6 | "Upstairs, Downstairs" | David Jones | April Smith | October 28, 1999 | 6ABM06 | 13.08 |
A man rushes his pregnant wife to the ER when she starts bleeding profusely, but has a heart attack and dies when he learns she miscarried. Desperate to have his baby, the doctors propose harvesting his sperm to impregnate her. But legal nightmares ensue, and the story is leaked to the tabloids. Dr. Simon treats a young boy with a brain tumor.
| 126 | 7 | "White Rabbit" | Michael Schultz | Mark Richard | November 11, 1999 | 6ABM07 | 10.69 |
The hospital is quarantined after it is inundated with the victims of a mysterious and deadly plague, which spreads to the hospital staff. A five-year-old girl can't be found as she chases the pet rabbit of the first plague victim throughout the hospital. A man with a tree limb through his chest has to be admitted to the ER, despite the quarantine, if he is to live.
| 127 | 8 | "The Heart to Heart" | Rob Corn | Chris Mundy | November 18, 1999 | 6ABM08 | 9.67 |
A liver arrives at Chicago Hope – intended for a patient who needs a heart-lung transplant immediately. Alberghetti has heard of a radical procedure developed by a Sri Lankan surgeon. It is radical, but it has worked on goats and besides, there are no other options. Nor is there a surgeon on hand who knows how to perform it. Meanwhile, details are shared about Hanlon and McNeils' first date – a complete disaster.
| 128 | 9 | "The Golden Hour" | Joan Tewkesbury | Linda McGibney | December 9, 1999 | 6ABM09 | 8.84 |
On their way to a football game, Aaron and Jack get sidetracked, finding themselves in a hostage situation with 3 wounded patients, a loose gunman, and the police about ready to enter the building. Meanwhile, Alberghetti and Hanlon must be creative: their patient was stabbed 30 times, and the knife is embedded in her heart.
| 129 | 10 | "Hanlon's Choice" | Steve Gomer | Marjorie David | January 6, 2000 | 6ABM10 | 10.62 |
Hanlon tries to treat a traditional Hmong woman with a cancerous lesion that might have metastasized to her lungs. But she and her family are skeptical of Western medicine and don't believe in surgery. Dr. Peters does his best to make Jeremy miserable in their department, and annoy Phillip. Alberghetti's patient is a 22-year-old who has a very serious heart infection of unknown origins, and refuses to remove his multiple body piercings. Jack feels left out when he isn't asked to write an article for Chicago Hope's new web site.
| 130 | 11 | "Faith, Hope & Surgery" | Adam Arkin | Gardner Stern | January 13, 2000 | 6ABM11 | 7.67 |
Simon's neurological operation on her mentor goes awry and the man slips into a coma. But his misfortune proves to be a blessing for others, beginning with his deeply religious 79-year-old mother, who suddenly no longer needs her walker after praying over him. Meanwhile, Geiger finds a researcher working on human cloning in a lab in the hospital basement. McNeil's friendship with Alberghetti hits a snag.
| 131 | 12 | "Letting Go" | Tony Bill | April Smith | January 20, 2000 | 6ABM12 | 9.59 |
A railroad engineer with a drug-resistant strain of TB requires surgery that is not performed at Chicago Hope. This necessitates calling in an expert on it, Wilkes' estranged Aunt Odelia. When Keith also tests positive for TB, he is forced to take an experimental drug to which he has a severe reaction. Meanwhile, Dr. Simon is stumped by a patient who has a wide variety of serious physical symptoms that keeps changing. She believes it's God's revenge for turning away from her dying twin sister.
| 132 | 13 | "Boys Will Be Girls" | John Heath | Linda McGibney | February 3, 2000 | 6ABM13 | 9.96 |
Based on the story of David Reimer, a biological male has been raised to live his life as a girl after a 'slip of a knife' as an infant. Now a teenager, and desperate to live in his true gender, McNeil goes to court to try to get permission for his transition. Simon and Alberghetti offer a woman with Alzheimer's disease an experimental vaccine.
| 133 | 14 | "Gray Matters" | Lou Antonio | Chris Mundy | February 10, 2000 | 6ABM14 | 8.04 |
After two children suffer liver failure, the father learns that he can donate part of his liver, but to only one child. His snap decision upsets Wilkes. Gina and Aaron are dating, but he wants to keep it a secret. The relationship is tested when Dr. Weber comes back to the hospital. McNeil writes a prescription for a cancer patient that he'll come to regret.
| 134 | 15 | "Painful Cuts" | Peter Medak | Mark Richard | February 17, 2000 | 6ABM15 | 8.41 |
Geiger is under enormous pressure from the hospital board to make drastic cuts, and because his daughter is facing life-threatening surgery. He had operated on her when she was born with congenital heart defects, but that was before she was his daughter. Now he's insisting on doing the surgery again, even though it's not permitted under hospital policy. Dr. Hanlon performs an appendectomy on an uninsured conjoined twin.
| 135 | 16 | "Simon Sez" | Jay Tobias | Susan Corscuna | February 24, 2000 | 6ABM16 | 8.62 |
A mentally challenged couple enters the hospital because the husband (John Ritter) needs open-heart surgery. The wife confides in Dr. Simon that she is having trouble getting pregnant. Simon investigates, and realizes she was sterilized without her consent.
| 136 | 17 | "Cold Hearts" | Robert Berlinger | Howard Chesley | March 30, 2000 | 6ABM17 | 7.73 |
McNeil struggles to be civil to an obnoxious female wrestler known as "The Death Angel", who scares a little girl on the way to surgery and complicates her treatment. Dr. Shutt needs to devise a new surgical option for the patient's tricky brain aneurysm, and gets help from Drs. Simon and Alberghetti. Meanwhile, Wilkes' son Raymond demands that his father treat his ailing pet tarantula.
| 137 | 18 | "Devoted Attachment" | Jerry Levine | Henry Bromell & Gardner Stern | April 6, 2000 | 6ABM18 | 8.57 |
Pancreatic cancer affects the conjoined twins that Dr. Hanlon had previously treated. But she cannot convince them to be separated, even though it will mean that both will die. McNeil's Boys Club mentor, whom he hadn't seen in 20 years, is shot, and prevails upon him to not report it to the police.
| 138 | 19 | "Miller Time" | Michael Pressman | Story by : Henry Bromell & Gardner Stern; Teleplay by : David E. Kelley | April 13, 2000 | 6ABM19 | 8.36 |
A smooth talking CEO, Hugh Miller, takes charge of the hospital when it is bought by an HMO, and starts shaking things up. A couple won't terminate a pregnancy when it's discovered that their baby has a malformed brain, so Aaron and Gina come up with a plan to do an experimental fetal operation. Miller gives permission to proceed, in part because he also owns a cable TV network, and plans to televise the procedure. But the parents aren't so sure, and then they accidentally observe Shutt and Simon in an embarrassing situation.
| 139 | 20 | "Thoughts of You" | Bill D'Elia | Story by : Henry Bromell; Teleplay by : Linda McGibney & April Smith | April 20, 2000 | 6ABM20 | 7.81 |
McNeil goes against procedure and red tape and performs a hip replacement surgery. Shutt and Simon transplant a computer into a patient's brain in an attempt to help him communicate. Alberghetti tries to ignore her feelings for Miller.
| 140 | 21 | "Everybody's Special at Chicago Hope" | Mark Harmon | Marjorie David | April 27, 2000 | 6ABM21 | 8.51 |
A coma victim awakens after 15 years. Miller learns firsthand how his cutbacks have affected the quality of care when a heart attack turns him into a patient, and what happens when the man who saves him is denied coverage.
| 141 | 22 | "Have I Got a Deal For You" | Rob Corn | Marjorie David & Chris Mundy | May 4, 2000 | 6ABM22 | 7.53 |
Series finale. With the hospital proving to be a profit drain, Chicago Hope's new parent company decides to sell, which will mean firing the staff and selling the equipment. So Miller devises a way to pay off the debts and keep the hospital alive. It's a plot that involves a computer whiz who's paralyzed and wants experimental surgery in which a computer chip could help him walk again.
