= Hit & Run (TV series) =

2021 Netflix Original television series

- Hebrew: פגע וברח
- Genre: Thriller; Action; Crime; Drama
- Created by: Avi Issacharoff; Dawn Prestwich; Lior Raz; Nicole Yorkin
- Written by: Avi Issacharoff; Dawn Prestwich; Lior Raz; Nicole Yorkin; Jessica Brickman; Ali Selim
- Directed by: Mike Barker; Neasa Hardiman; Rotem Shamir
- Starring: Lior Raz; Lior Ashkenazi; Sanaa Lathan; Kaelen Ohm; Igal Naor
- Composer: Peter Raeburn
- Countries of origin: Israel; United States
- Original languages: English; Hebrew
- No. of seasons: 1
- No. of episodes: 9

Production
- Executive producers: Lior Raz; Mike Barker; Kimberlin Belloni; Peter Principato; Itay Reiss; Avi Issacharoff; Dawn Prestwich; Nicole Yorkin; David Hoberman; Todd Lieberman; Laurie Zaks
- Production locations: Jerusalem, Israel; Tel Aviv, Israel; New York, United States

Original release
- Network: Netflix
- Release: August 6, 2021

Hit & Run (Hebrew: פגע וברח, romanized: Paga U'varach) is an Israeli-American thriller television series created and written by Avi Issacharoff, Lior Raz, Dawn Prestwich, and Nicole Yorkin. The series premiered on 6 August 2021 on Netflix. In September 2021, the series was canceled after one season.

== Synopsis ==
Hit and Run centers on a happily married man, Segev Azulai, whose life is turned upside down when his wife is killed in a mysterious hit and run accident in Tel Aviv. Grief-stricken and confused, he searches for his wife’s killers, who have fled to the U.S. With the help of an ex-lover, Naomi Hicks, he uncovers disturbing truths about his beloved wife and the secrets she kept from him.

== Episodes ==
| No. | Title | Directed by | Written by | Original release date |
|---|---|---|---|---|
| 1 | "Hit & Run" | Mike Barker | Nicole Yorkin & Dawn Prestwich and Lior Raz & Avi Issacharoff | August 6, 2021 |
| 2 | "Love & Loss" | Rotem Shamir | Story by : Nicole Yorkin & Dawn Prestwich and Lior Raz & Avi Issacharoff; Teleplay by : Nicole Yorkin & Dawn Prestwich and Lior Raz & Avi Issacharoff and Lauren Mackenzie & Andrew Gettens | August 6, 2021 |
| 3 | "Friends & Foes" | Mike Barker | Lydia Woodward | August 6, 2021 |
| 4 | "Breaking & Entering" | Mike Barker | Wes Taylor | August 6, 2021 |
| 5 | "Flesh & Blood" | Neasa Hardiman | Jessica Brickman | August 6, 2021 |
| 6 | "Hide & Seek" | Neasa Hardiman | Ali Selim | August 6, 2021 |
| 7 | "Part & Parcel" | Neasa Hardiman | Lauren Mackenzie & Andrew Gettens | August 6, 2021 |
| 8 | "Prose & Cons" | Mike Barker | Wes Taylor | August 6, 2021 |
| 9 | "Search & Destroy" | Mike Barker | Story by : Nicole Yorkin & Dawn Prestwich and Lior Raz & Avi Issacharoff and Wes Taylor; Teleplay by : Nicole Yorkin & Dawn Prestwich | August 6, 2021 |

== Cast ==
- Lior Raz as Segev Azulai
- Lior Ashkenazi as Assaf Talmor
- Sanaa Lathan as Naomi Hicks
- Kaelen Ohm as Danielle Wexler Azulai / Sophie Dreyer
- Moran Rosenblatt as Tali Shapira
- Gregg Henry as Martin Wexler
- Gal Toren as Ron Harel
- Igal Naor as Tamir Edri

== Production and distribution ==
Hit & Run was written by Avi Issacharoff, Lior Raz, Dawn Prestwich, and Nicole Yorkin. Mike Barker directed the pilot and three other episodes; Neasa Hardiman and Rotem Shamir directed 3 and 2 episodes, respectively. This is the first Netflix original series from Israel. On 20 September 2021, after mediocre streaming success, Netflix canceled the series after one season.

=== Release ===
On 12 July 2021, Netflix released the first trailer for the series. The series premiered on 6 August 2021.

== Reception ==
Daniel Feinberg panned the show, writing for The Hollywood Reporter that any "momentum Hit & Run builds in the early episodes - and it builds a tremendous amount - basically dissipates due to increasingly dumb narrative developments."

In the Decider, Joel Keller recommends the show, saying it "boasts a fine international cast, an interesting premise, and opens up a lot of story avenues without confusing the viewer".
