= Nicole Yorkin =

American television writer and producer

Nicole Yorkin is an American television writer and producer. In 1997, she shared an Emmy Award nomination with several producers of Chicago Hope in the category "Outstanding Drama Series". In 2003, she and her writing partner Dawn Prestwich won a Writers Guild of America (WGA) award for the pilot episode of the episodic drama The Education of Max Bickford.

== Biography ==
She is the daughter of the late screenwriter and television director and producer Bud Yorkin.

In 2009, Prestwich and Yorkin joined the crew of new ABC science fiction drama FlashForward as consulting producers and writers. The series was co-created by David S. Goyer and Brannon Braga. The show follows a team of FBI agents investigating a global blackout that gave victims a vision of their future. Prestwich and Yorkin co-wrote the teleplay for the episode "Gimme Some Truth" based on a story by Barbara Nance. They also co-wrote the episodes "Believe" and "Goodbye Yellow Brick Road".

She co-created the period drama Z: The Beginning of Everything with Prestwich in 2015.

In 2019, Yorkin was on the negotiating committee for the "WGA-Agency Agreement", and joined other WGA members in firing her agents as part of the guild's stand against the ATA after the two sides were unable to come to an agreement on a new "Code of Conduct" that addressed the practice of packaging.

In 2021, she co-created the Netflix international action drama Hit & Run with Prestwich, Lior Raz and Avi Issacharoff.

== Credits ==
- The Trials of Rosie O'Neill (1990–1991) - writer
- Angel Street (1992) - writer
- Melrose Place (1993) - writer
- Birdland (1994) - writer
- Touched by an Angel (1994) - writer
- Christy (1994–1995) - writer
- Sliders (1995) - writer
- Picket Fences (1995–1996) - writer, co-producer
- Chicago Hope (1995–1999) - writer, co-executive producer
- Ally McBeal (1998) - writer
- Judging Amy (1999–2001) - writer and co-executive producer
- The Education of Max Bickford (2001–2002) - creator, writer and executive producer
- Carnivàle (2003–2005) - writer and co-executive producer
- Battlestar Galactica (2005) - writer
- Brotherhood (2006) - writer and co-executive producer
- Dirt (2006) - writer
- The Riches (2007–2008) - writer and executive producer
- FlashForward (2009–2010) - writer and consulting producer
- The Killing (2011–2014) - writer and executive producer
- Z: The Beginning of Everything (2015–2017) - creator, writer and executive producer
- Hit & Run (2021) - creator, writer and executive producer
