= Dawn Prestwich =

American television writer and producer

Dawn Prestwich is an American television writer and producer. She attended the Hockaday School in Dallas, Texas, and Stanford University. In 1997, she shared an Emmy nomination with several producers of Chicago Hope in the category "Outstanding Drama Series". In 2003, she and her writing partner Nicole Yorkin won a Writers Guild of America award for the pilot episode of the episodic drama The Education of Max Bickford.

In 2009 Prestwich and Yorkin joined the crew of new ABC science fiction drama FlashForward as consulting producers and writers. The series was co-created by David S. Goyer and Brannon Braga. The show follows a team of FBI agents investigating a global blackout that gave victims a vision of their future. Prestwich and Yorkin co-wrote the teleplay for the episode "Gimme Some Truth" based on a story by Barbara Nance. They also co-wrote the episodes "Believe" and "Goodbye Yellow Brick Road".

She co-created the period drama Z: The Beginning of Everything for Amazon with Yorkin in 2015.

In 2021, she co-created the Netflix international action drama Hit & Run with Yorkin, Lior Raz and Avi Issacharoff.

She lives in Los Angeles, California, with her husband John Wescott (m. 2022) and has two sons, Noah and Isaac.

== Credits ==
- The Trials of Rosie O'Neill (1990-1991) - writer
- Angel Street (1992) - writer
- Melrose Place (1993) - writer
- Birdland (1994) - writer
- Touched by an Angel (1994) - writer
- Christy (1994-1995) - writer
- Sliders (1995) - writer
- Picket Fences (1995-1996) - writer, co-producer
- Chicago Hope (1995–1999) - writer, co-executive producer
- Ally McBeal (1998) - writer
- Judging Amy (1999–2001) - writer and co-executive producer
- The Education of Max Bickford (2001–2002) - creator, writer and executive producer
- Carnivàle (2003–2005) - writer and co-executive producer
- Battlestar Galactica (2005) - writer
- Brotherhood (2006) - writer and co-executive producer
- Dirt (2006) - writer
- The Riches (2007–2008) - writer and executive producer
- FlashForward (2009–2010) - writer and consulting producer
- The Killing (2011–2014) - writer and executive producer
- Z: The Beginning of Everything (2015–2017) - creator, writer and executive producer
- Hit & Run (2021) - creator, writer and executive producer
