= Ellie Herman =

Ellie Herman is an American television writer, teacher and blogger, based in Los Angeles, California.

== Career ==
She has written for Melrose Place, My So-Called Life, Desperate Housewives, Jericho, Century City, That Was Then, Significant Others, Relativity, Chicago Hope, Doogie Howser, M.D., Northern Exposure, Gabriel's Fire, Newhart, Moon Over Miami and The Riches.

She has a teaching blog, "Gatsby In L.A.," about a teacher's journey through the classrooms of Los Angeles.

== Awards ==
In 1989, she received an O. Henry Award for her short story "Unstable Ground".

She received a PEN Center USA Freedom to Write award in 2011 for Animo Pat Brown Charter High School's literary journal Truth.
