= Z: A Novel of Zelda Fitzgerald =

2013 biographical novel

- Front cover
- Author: Therese Fowler
- Genre: Biographical novel
- Publisher: St. Martin's Press
- Publication date: 11 April 2013
- Pages: 375
- ISBN: 978-1-250-02865-5

Z: A Novel of Zelda Fitzgerald is a 2013 biographical novel by Therese Fowler about Zelda Fitzgerald. It follows her through her marriage to F. Scott Fitzgerald, the pair's writing careers, their relationship to Ernest Hemingway, the upbringing of their daughter Frances Scott Fitzgerald and Zelda's declining mental health and death. It was adapted into a television series, Z: The Beginning of Everything, which aired in 2017 after a 2015 pilot episode.

== Background ==
The book describes the life of Zelda Fitzgerald, an American socialite who became a symbol of the Jazz Age. She married the author F. Scott Fitzgerald, who later wrote The Great Gatsby (1925). While researching Zelda Fitzgerald, the author Therese Fowler found that her perceptions of the figure were misrepresentations, and she became inspired to "set the record straight" in popular culture. Z received a first printing run of 150,000 copies, and was published by St. Martin's Press in the United States and John Murray in the United Kingdom.

== Synopsis ==
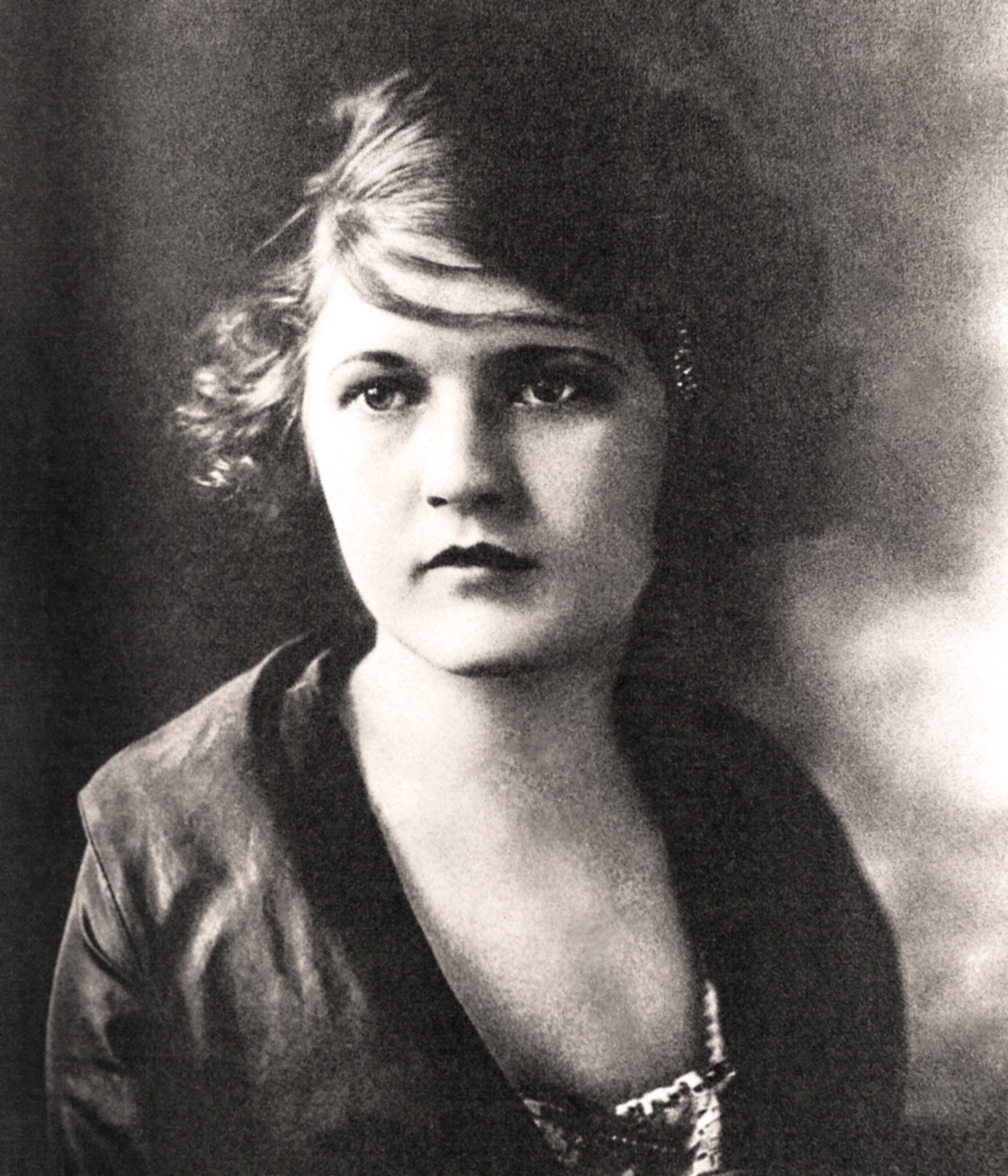
Zelda Fitzgerald

The book is a fictionalized account of Zelda Fitzgerald's life. In her early life in Montgomery, Alabama, Fitzgerald is portrayed as the subject of desire by many men. Her future husband F. Scott Fitzgerald—stationed in Montgomery as a World War I soldier—asks her out, but Zelda's father is disapproving and Scott is initially unsuccessful in his writing. He achieves fame with This Side of Paradise (1920), following which the couple began to attend increasingly raucous parties. The novel gives focus to the relationship between Ernest Hemingway and Scott, and how Hemingway disliked Zelda. After the couple's daughter Frances Scott Fitzgerald is born, it shows Zelda publishing short stories under Scott's name, and studying art and ballet. The book covers the mental illnesses of Zelda in later life, and her death in a sanatorium fire.

== Reception ==
In The New York Times, Penelope Green characterized it as "a rather tame affair, dutiful but somehow distant, as is sometimes the case when one's material is so well-known", and commented that Zelda is portrayed as "a perky helpmeet to her husband". In a mixed review, The Independent's Lesley McDowell found the book to decline in quality in coverage of Fitzgerald's later life, praising that it "makes excellent use of Zelda's biographical details, and pays close attention to the different arguments about Zelda's life with Scott", but criticizing an absence of the "trickier psychological aspects" of Fitzgerald.

Endorsing the book as a Publishers Weekly pick, the magazine praised the research behind the novel and described it as "a close study of [the Fitzgeralds's] famously tumultuous relationship, sparing no detail by following the Fitzgeralds through the less glamorous parts of their lives and the more obscure moments of history". However, they suggested that Fitzgerald is portrayed as "softer" and "more anxious" than other parts of her history indicate. A review in USA Today lauded the book as "a parallel picture of not just a pioneering woman but a groundbreaking era", praising the research as thorough. It highlighted the description of the history around The Great Gatsby as "fascinating", but criticized that the "expository prose is less than zingy".

== Television adaptation ==
The book was adapted into an Amazon Studios television series, Z: The Beginning of Everything, with the pilot released on November 5, 2015, and the remaining nine episodes debuting on January 27, 2017. The series was renewed for a second season but later cancelled.
