= The Riches =

American TV drama

- Genre: Drama
- Created by: Dmitry Lipkin
- Starring: Eddie Izzard; Minnie Driver; Shannon Marie Woodward; Noel Fisher; Aidan Mitchell; Todd Stashwick; Gregg Henry
- Theme music composer: Toby Chu
- Country of origin: United States
- Original language: English
- No. of seasons: 2
- No. of episodes: 20

Production
- Executive producers: Dmitry Lipkin; Dawn Prestwich; Nicole Yorkin; Peter O'Fallon; Eddie Izzard; Mark Morgan
- Producers: Paul Kurta; Sara E. Morrow
- Production locations: Marrero, Louisiana; New Orleans, Louisiana; Santa Clarita, California
- Camera setup: Single-camera setup
- Running time: 40–60 minutes
- Production companies: Maverick Television; Fox Television Studios; FX Productions

Original release
- Network: FX
- Release: March 12, 2007 – April 29, 2008

The Riches (styled as the R1¢hes) is an American drama television series which was originally broadcast from March 12, 2007, to April 29, 2008, on FX. The series stars Eddie Izzard and Minnie Driver as members of a family of Irish Travellers who "steal the American dream" by stealing the home and identities of a wealthy dead couple. The series received positive reviews but was cancelled after two seasons.

== History ==
Originally named Low Life, the show was created and head written by Dmitry Lipkin for Maverick Films and FX Networks. The one-hour pilot was written by Lipkin and Eddie Izzard, and directed by Carl Franklin. The pilot was then rethought and reshot over 10 days by Peter O'Fallon. It first aired on March 12, 2007 followed by a further 12 episodes. Additionally, the first two episodes were made available on the Internet prior to their television air dates. FX announced on May 8, 2007 that The Riches would return for a second season, the first episode of which aired on March 18, 2008. The second season ran for 7 episodes. FX President John Landgraf described The Riches as a "family show", albeit one featuring "a family unlike any television viewers have seen before".

The second season was affected by the 2007–08 Writers Guild of America strike and was abruptly cut short. Several months after the season ended, the show was cancelled, with FX blaming a drop in ratings. In 2019 Minnie Driver lamented the cancellation, and wrote that the show was "cancelled in the wake of punitive measures taken against writers who were vocal in the writers strike".

== Plot ==
The show features Izzard and Driver as Wayne and Dahlia Malloy who, along with their family, are Irish Traveller con artists and thieves. They travel with their children Di Di (Delilah), Cael, and Sam.

As the series begins, Dahlia has just been paroled from prison. During her 2-year sentence, she has developed various drug addictions. In her absence, Wayne and the children have been continuing to act as con artists across the U.S. After a brief reunion with their Traveller clan, the family flees to avoid an arranged marriage for Di Di. Wayne steals a large amount from the clan's hoard of cash, and the family runs off. After getting into an altercation and RV chase with another Traveller family, the Malloys are involved in a car accident that kills a very wealthy couple, the eponymous Riches. In the hopes of pursuing a "better life", they decide to "steal the American dream" and adopt the Riches' identities in an affluent gated community in Baton Rouge, Louisiana. They struggle to adjust to their new lives as buffers, as they call people who are not Travellers.

== Cast and characters ==
The Malloys (clockwise from left): Dahlia, Cael, Di Di, Wayne, and Sam

- Wayne Malloy (Eddie Izzard) – Wayne is the paternal head of the Malloy family (not to be confused with the extended Malloy 'clan'). He is a consummate, intelligent grifter and thief who experienced an 'existential crisis' while his wife was serving time in prison. He has become disillusioned with the nomadic, scamming lifestyle of the Travellers; it was his idea to steal the identities of deceased Doug and Cherien Rich and settle down into a normal life. Dahlia has referred to him as a 'halfbreed' or 'half buffer', because he did not come from a Traveller bloodline.
- Dahlia Malloy (Minnie Driver) – Dahlia is Wayne's newly paroled wife. Her behavior is erratic and unpredictable, exacerbated by drug habits picked up in prison. A recovering methamphetamine addict, Dahlia imbibed a wide array of legal and illegal drugs since her parole, but recently she appears to be trying to get clean. Dahlia is considered 'royalty' in their Traveller clan, and her connection to the clan (both by blood and ideology) appears to be much stronger than Wayne's. She was initially very skeptical of Wayne's plan to leave their old lifestyle and impersonate the Riches and has struggled to live as Cherien Rich.
- Cael Malloy (Noel Fisher) – Cael is the eldest Malloy son. He is quiet and intelligent. His skills include carrying out petty cash-register cons, faking epileptic seizures, picking locks, creating fake identity documents, disabling alarm systems, and stealing cars. While his sister Di Di is more supportive of their father, Cael is more supportive of their mother and the traditional Traveller lifestyle and beliefs. Likewise, his reception to the "Rich" lifestyle is less enthusiastic than that of his ambitious father and siblings.
- Delilah "Di Di" Malloy (Shannon Marie Woodward) – Di Di is the adolescent daughter of Wayne and Dahlia. Like her siblings she is intelligent, crafty, and adept at various scams and thievery. In the pilot's opening scene she is seen pickpocketing people at a high-school class reunion while Wayne distracts them. Di Di's relationship with her mother appears to be strained; at one point when angered, she lies to her mother about sleeping with her boyfriend Erick. When it temporarily seemed the family would split up, Di Di chose to stay with her father. She embraced the Riches' way of life and no longer seems interested in the Traveller lifestyle.
- Sam Malloy (Aidan Mitchell) – Sam, the youngest Malloy child, is gender non-conforming, and frequently dresses in feminine clothing. The idea for Sam's non-binary gender expression came about before Izzard—a gender non-conforming comedian—joined the show. Sam's gender expression is accepted and respected by their parents and siblings. On their first night in the Rich home, Sam draws a large mural on a bedroom wall depicting the family's recent adventures, including the car accident and Dahlia's release from prison. In addition to artistic skill, Sam is interested in French and very earnest about getting a good education. Like the rest of the family, Sam appears to be very clever and adept at trickery. In episode 3, Sam is the key player in an elaborate con of Dahlia's to get the Malloy children into Rosemere Academy. During the season 1 finale, Sam expresses reluctance and even denial in leaving Eden Falls.
- Dale Malloy (Todd Stashwick) – Dale is cousin to Dahlia. He and Wayne were raised like brothers in the Malloy clan. Within the code of the family Dale expected that one day he would marry Dahlia and take his rightful place as head of the family once his father, Earl, died. A borderline sociopath whose life becomes slowly unhinged. Feeling wronged many times over by Wayne he is hell bent on revenge against Wayne and his family. Feeling the pain of his unrequited love and the fact that his father was going to pass the reins of the clan on to Wayne, Dale goes to murderous lengths to protect his legacy. Eventually discovering the Riches' secret, he now finds himself in an unholy alliance with Wayne, leveraging the truth to his selfish needs.

== Episodes ==
=== Season 1 (2007) ===
The first season's episodes began airing on March 12, 2007. The pilot episode and episode 1.2 ("Believe the Lie") were made available early for online viewing at MSN, Yahoo!, and TV.com at various times.

No. overall	No. in season	Title	Directed by	Written by	Original release date
1	1	"Pilot"	Carl Franklin; Peter O'Fallon	Story by : Dmitry Lipkin & Eddie Izzard; Teleplay by : Dmitry Lipkin	March 12, 2007
After Dahlia Malloy is paroled, her Irish Traveller con artist family finds themselves on the run from their relatives after avoiding an arranged marriage for their daughter and stealing the clan's money. When they're accidentally involved in the death of the Riches, the Malloys decide to adopt the Riches' identity in suburban Baton Rouge, Louisiana. At the end of the episode, Wayne recites a passage from William Stafford's A Story That Could Be True
2	2	"Believe the Lie"	Peter O'Fallon	Story by : Dmitry Lipkin and Nicole Yorkin & Dawn Prestwich; Teleplay by : Nicole Yorkin & Dawn Prestwich	March 19, 2007
Wayne attends a job interview with a law firm, but ends up bluffing his way into a job as in-house counsel for Hugh Panetta instead. Dahlia, still struggling with her drug issues and their new 'buffer' lifestyle, hides the clan's money, but forgets where she buried it when the family RV is towed. Di Di and Cael try to adjust to their new life, helping Wayne find out information about the dead Riches; Cael still misses his girlfriend back at the camp. Dale Malloy and Ginny Dannegan have several altercations.
3	3	"Operation Education"	Peter O'Fallon	Dmitry Lipkin	March 26, 2007
Wayne begins work at his new job as a lawyer for Panco, one of Hugh Panetta's companies. One of his first duties, assigned to him by Hugh, is to fire his predecessor. Meanwhile, Wayne and Dahlia decide the kids should go to school, so they get them social security cards and attend an interview at Rosemere Academy, an exclusive private school. When they are rejected, Dahlia's pride is hurt, and she cooks up an elaborate scheme to win over the school's headmistress. Back at the Traveller camp, Dale is pressuring Cael's girlfriend Tammy to help him find out where the family has fled.
4	4	"Been There, Done That"	Gwyneth Horder-Payton	Nicole Yorkin & Dawn Prestwich	April 2, 2007
Wayne continues his new job at Panco, where he learns that Hugh Panetta has developed real estate on old military sites containing unexploded ordnance. Doug Rich's ex-wife Jolinda tracks down Wayne (posing as Doug) because Doug owes her $75,000 in back alimony. Wayne and Dahlia work a complicated con involving Jolinda's lawyer and the sale of one of Jim Burns' alpacas in order to pay her off. Dahlia continues to struggle with drug issues, and gets stoned with Nina. It is revealed that one of Wayne's scams went wrong and caused Dahlia's jail sentence; Wayne and Dahlia finally discuss the situation and Dahlia's resulting drug use, and have a reconciliation of sorts. At Rosemere Academy, Cael helps some classmates break in after hours to alter grade records, and Di Di appears to be striking up a romance with local stoner and musician Erick. Finally, Hugh Panetta catches Dahlia stealing a pill bottle in the bathroom of the Burns' house.
5	5	"The Big Floss"	Brian Kirk	Lydia Woodward	April 9, 2007
While Wayne must deal with legal arcana in an eminent-domain case, Dahlia gets a job for which she is equally unqualified: a dental hygienist. Meanwhile, Ginny Dannegan has tracked down the Malloys at their new home, and apparently blackmails Wayne and Dahlia into going through with the arranged marriage between Di Di and Ken.
6	6	"Reckless Gardening"	Guy Ferland	Ellen Herman	April 16, 2007
The Riches have trouble dealing with Ken, while Dahlia becomes Hugh's Personal Assistant. The family must rely on Dahlia's skills to save them when Di Di takes a fall for Ken when her classmates plant cannabis on him. Dale Malloy takes brutal action when he learns that his father, Earl Malloy, has planned for Wayne to lead the Malloy clan upon his death. Dale then leaves Earl in the woods to die before he can proclaim Wayne the leader.
7	7	"Virgin Territory"	Brian Kirk	Wendy Riss	April 23, 2007
Wayne, Dahlia, Cael, Di Di and Sam go back to the camp for Earl's funeral. Traveller tradition dictates that after a funeral comes a wedding (something dies, something is born), so Di Di prepares to marry Ken until Wayne can think of a way out. Meanwhile, Dale gives a nervous and guilty confession to Dahlia regarding Earl's death. She forces him at gunpoint to write a letter to his mother and the rest of the clan revealing what he's done. Wayne fails to come through for Di Di and the wedding ceremony goes on as planned, that is until Di Di ultimately refuses to marry Ken. Afterwards, in her RV, Ginny again threatens Di Di, making her agree to sleep with Ken. She leaves and Ken comes in, and when Di Di refuses to sleep with him, she explains that she only went as far as she did with the wedding because of Ginny's threats. Ken assures Di Di that she is safe from Ginny because he'll always love her and protect her.
8	8	"X Spots the Mark"	Dan Lerner	Aaron Blitzstein	April 30, 2007
The Malloys return from the funeral to find Hugh Panetta is having a fit; $40,000 is missing from his safe, and he is forcing all the employees to undergo lie detector tests and searches. Hugh attacks Wayne, accusing him of taking the money (which he is not certain of), and disappearing for two days (which is provable). Wayne concocts a story about a potential Panco investor, who is possibly going to invest a half-million dollars in the company. After mollifying Hugh with this lie, Wayne and Dahlia then need to find a mark who can actually be conned into doing just that. With the help of some recent acquaintances from a nearby trailer park, they proceed to lay in a plan to get Rudy Blue (Clancy Brown), a former baseball star with a known sex addiction, to invest the money.
9	9	"Cinderella"	Matt Shakman	Colette Burson	May 7, 2007
While at the liquor store shopping for a dinner party, Dahlia runs into her best friend from prison, Chunky K. After some reservations about not revealing herself to Chunky, Dahlia, who is becoming increasingly isolated, takes her home, and hires her to be the maid during the dinner party. Chunky, however, is a more common criminal, and is not up to the high-stakes level of deceit the Malloys are engaging in.
10	10	"This Is Your Brain On Drugs"	Jeremy Podeswa	Ellen Herman	May 14, 2007
Wayne suspects that Dahlia still has a drug addiction and takes meth himself as a way of showing her how much her drug use hurts their family. Meanwhile, when things at Panco go crazy, it is up to Dahlia to keep everything and everyone together. Finally, Dale shows up at Edenfalls and befriends the family's neighbor, Hartley.
11	11	"Anything Hugh Can Do, I Can Do Better"	Adam Arkin	Story by : Ellen Herman; Teleplay by : Nicole Yorkin & Dawn Prestwich	May 21, 2007
Wayne takes over Panco when Hugh goes missing, and Dahlia struggles to repair her relationship with Di Di. Dale tells Hartley why he's at Edenfalls. Guest Star: Jonathan Goldstein as Wes
12	12	"It's a Wonderful Lie"	Peter O'Fallon	Story by : Lydia Woodward; Teleplay by : Nicole Yorkin & Dawn Prestwich	May 28, 2007
When Doug's friend Pete visits, the Malloys must keep him in the dark about what they have done. The family cons Pete into thinking that Doug is avoiding him by giving him the wrong address, which causes Pete to come close to a nervous breakdown. Wayne pretends to be a psychologist when Pete is on vacation. Nina comes across the Malloys deceiving Pete and she becomes convinced that the family is in the Witness Protection Program. Dahlia is heartbroken that she must deceive her friend. Meanwhile, Hugh returns with a new wife whom he met during his relapse and subsequent disappearance. However, Hugh demands a post-nuptial agreement which leads the girl to question his love for her.
13	13	"Waiting For Dogot"	Jamie Babbit	Dmitry Lipkin	June 4, 2007
Pete figures out the Malloys are impersonating the Riches and wants to know why. Doug spins a new lie, claiming to be Gene and that he was hired by Doug, who is in hiding. After pretending to leave a coded message for Doug (by singing Amazing Grace), Wayne takes Pete to the woods and threatens him with a gun. Wayne explains that Doug and Cherien are in hiding, having witnessed a murder, and Cael fakes a text message from Doug to tell Wayne that Pete is not a threat. Pete begins to believe Wayne's farce, but when he realizes the gun is a water pistol, Wayne is forced to knock Pete out. Dale shows up at the house, while Wayne is gone, and Dahlia convinces him to leave, but the jig is up. Drugging Pete with rohypnol, the Malloys bolt for the RV. Dale comes back to the house and finds Pete, whom he beats up and threatens with a hammer. Meanwhile, the Malloys are unable to flee Edenfalls, as Dale secretly sabotaged their RV engine.

=== Season 2 (2008) ===
A second season of 13 episodes was announced on May 8, 2007, by FX for broadcast in the first half of 2008. It premiered on March 18, 2008. Due to a long writer's strike, only 7 episodes were produced.

No. overall	No. in season	Title	Directed by	Written by	Original release date
14	1	"The Last Temptation of Wayne"	Guy Ferland	Dmitry Lipkin	March 18, 2008
Wayne sends Dahlia, the kids, and Cherien's mother away while he stays to deal with Pete Mincey, which Dale has continued to screw up. However, things look up when Hugh offers Wayne a piece of a land deal. Meanwhile, Nina decides to leave Eden Falls with Dahlia.
15	2	"Friday Night Lights"	Guy Ferland	Ellen Herman & Dmitry Lipkin	March 25, 2008
Wayne deals with Dale and Pete while Dahlia and the kids get held up in Blunt, Texas where they have to rescue Nina who is being held hostage by a local couple.
16	3	"Field of Dreams"	Peter O'Fallon	Dawn Prestwich & Nicole Yorkin	April 1, 2008
Wayne is forced to deal with the Eden Falls elite after Cael is caught tampering with the school's computer. Meanwhile, Hugh is deemed psychologically inept to handle the Bayou Hills deal due to depression. Also, Dale demands a job at Panco, and nobody is happy that a traveler named Quinn arrives after spending 20 years in prison.
17	4	"Slums of Bayou Hills"	Seith Mann	Ellen Herman	April 8, 2008
Living honestly isn't as easy as Dahlia had hoped. Wayne runs into trouble when Doug's past creeps up on him in an important investors meeting. Cael and Didi try to recapture the spirit of their Traveller childhood.
18	5	"Trust Never Sleeps"	Peter O'Fallon	Timothy J. Lea	April 15, 2008
Dahlia continues to struggle to live an honest life while Wayne is surprised by a visitor at work. Meanwhile, Cael meets another group of Travelers.
19	6	"Dead Calm"	Michael Spiller	Wendy Riss	April 22, 2008
Wayne struggles to regain Dahlia's trust while also attempting to keep Dale and the other Travellers away. Meanwhile, Cael and Rosaleen become closer, and Nina throws a party for Jim.
20	7	"The Lying King"	Peter O'Fallon	Alexander Cary	April 29, 2008
The rift in Wayne and Dahlia's relationship continues to widen while Nina becomes sick of Dahlia's lies. The Bayou Hills deal is put at risk because of treacherous behavior at the construction site. Meanwhile, a relationship between Di Di and Ike blossoms, and Cael decides to stay at Rosaleen's camp, which is exactly what Quinn wants.

== Ratings ==
The pilot episode of The Riches drew 3.8 million viewers. With 2.5 million of those viewers in the 18–49 demographic, The Riches scored second only to the premiere of The Shield, thus beating out the premieres of other FX dramas such as Rescue Me, Over There, and Dirt. The pilot was also FX's first-ever Sunday night premiere of an original series, and more than doubled the channel's highest-ever ratings for the Sunday 10pm slot. The show averaged 5.9 million cumulative viewers per week in the US, sufficient for FX to commission a second season. The Riches has gained popularity through online resources, such as Hulu and iTunes' "What We Are Watching" for April 2008.

== Critical reception ==
Television critics gave The Riches enthusiastic reviews. The Baltimore Sun described it as "the kind of TV drama that makes one think while being entertained". and The Boston Globe lauded a "layered drama" full of "unexpectedly soulful pleasures". The New York Times wrote that "together, [Izzard and Driver] are superb". Meanwhile, The Los Angeles Times complained that the show lacked originality.

Time magazine's James Poniewozik named it one of the Top 10 New TV Series of 2006, ranking it at #7, while Minnie Driver was nominated for a Primetime Emmy Award and a Golden Globe Award for her performance.

In a review of the second season, The Hollywood Reporter said that "Izzard and Driver remain a joy to watch in this odd but fascinating series that is derivative of nothing on TV", while the San Francisco Chronicle described the second season as "gloriously inventive, daring and provocative".

== Home releases ==
The First Season
Release dates	Set details	Special features
United States January 8, 2008	13 Episodes; 4-Disc Set; 1.78:1 Aspect Ratio; 616 Minutes; Languages: English (Dolby Digital 2.0 Surround); Subtitles: English; French; Spanish	Audio Commentary; "Pilot"; "Waiting For Doug"; Casting Session; World Premiere; Gag Reel; 7 Webisodes from FX.com
United Kingdom February 19, 2007	13 Episodes; 4-Disc Set; 1.78:1 Aspect Ratio; 616 Minutes; Languages: English (Dolby Digital 2.0 Surround); Subtitles: English; French; Spanish	Audio Commentary; "Pilot"; "Waiting For Doug"; Casting Session; World Premiere; Gag Reel; 7 Webisodes from FX.com
The Second Season
United States March 24, 2009	7 Episodes; 2-Disc Set; 1.78:1 Aspect Ratio; 296 Minutes; Languages: English; Subtitles: English; French; Spanish	Eddie Izzard: Revealed Featurette

== Film ==
In 2008, Eddie Izzard said that a low-budget Riches movie was being developed, and added "We'll shoot it guerilla-style, using gorillas to actually shoot it. We're going to give them cameras...No, we're going to just get in there and maybe not have permission to do things, but just film it." But the film never materialized.
