= The Education of Max Bickford =

- The Education of Max Bickford cast
- Genre: Drama
- Created by: Dawn Prestwich; Nicole Yorkin
- Starring: Richard Dreyfuss; Marcia Gay Harden; Katee Sackhoff; Regina Taylor; Meredith Roberts; Eric Ian Goldberg; Helen Shaver
- Composers: David Was; Don Was
- Country of origin: United States
- Original language: English
- No. of seasons: 1
- No. of episodes: 22

Production
- Executive producers: Keith Addis; Joe Cacaci; Rod Holcomb; Dawn Prestwich; Nicole Yorkin
- Producer: Richard Dreyfuss
- Production locations: New York City; Wagner College
- Running time: 60 minutes
- Production companies: Sugar Mama Productions; Joe Cacaci Productions; Regency Television; CBS Productions; 20th Century Fox Television

Original release
- Network: CBS
- Release: September 23, 2001 – June 2, 2002

The Education of Max Bickford is an American drama television series that aired Sundays at 8:00 pm (EST) on CBS from September 23, 2001, to June 2, 2002, during the 2001–02 television season. After a strong initial launch, the show's audience "dropped sharply afterward" despite its prime time slot following 60 Minutes. Within a month, two of its three executive producers were removed and reports claimed the show was being "overhauled", though CBS denied this, preferring the term "creative adjustments".

In May 2002, Touched by an Angel was returned to its Sunday 8 p.m. slot, bumping the second-to-last episode of The Education of Max Bickford to Monday. In June 2002, the final episode aired and the show was not renewed.

== Overview ==
The series starred Richard Dreyfuss as the title character, a college professor of American Studies at Chadwick College, an all-women's school in Massachusetts. Max is a recovering alcoholic trying to rebuild his life and to prove that his teachings are still relevant to a generation far different from his own. He is often challenged by the faculty over his unorthodox style and cantankerous personality.

Also starring was child actor Eric Ian Goldberg as Max's son Lester Bickford, and Katee Sackhoff as his daughter Nell, the latter of whom attends Chadwick. Max's colleagues include Marcia Gay Harden as Andrea Haskell, his former student (and lover) who recently joined the faculty, and Helen Shaver as his best friend Erica, a transgender woman.

"Max Bickford" was one of the first series to be produced in High-Definition. Cinematographer Michael Mayers was brought in to pioneer this move into Hi-Def.

== Cast ==
=== Main ===
- Richard Dreyfuss – Max Bickford
- Marcia Gay Harden – Andrea Haskell
- Regina Taylor – Judith Bryant
- Helen Shaver – Erica Bettis
- Katee Sackhoff – Nell Bickford
- Eric Ian Goldberg – Lester Bickford
- Meredith Roberts – Brenda Vanderpool
- Molly Regan – Lorraine Tator
- Stephen Spinella – Rex Pinsker
- David McCallum – Walter Thornhill

=== Recurring ===
- Jayne Atkinson – Lyla Ortiz
- Stefanie Bari – Anna
- Natalie Venetia Belcon – Rose Quigley
- Craig Bonacorsi – Adam
- Brennan Brown – Ron Zinn
- Lynn Collins
- Angel Desai – Jardie
- Ylfa Edelstein – Isabelle
- Angela Goethals – Danielle Hodges
- Donna Murphy – Esther Weber
- Coté de Pablo – Gina
- Ellen Parker – Noleen Bettis
- Kristen Schaal – Valerie Holmes
- Chris Stack – Alec
- Kellee Stewart – Yolanda

== Episodes ==
No.	Title	Directed by	Written by	Original release date	Prod. code
1	"Pilot"	Rod Holcomb	Dawn Prestwich & Nicole Yorkin	September 23, 2001	1AFB79
2	"Herding Cats"	Rod Holcomb	Dawn Prestwich & Nicole Yorkin	September 30, 2001	1AFB01
3	"Who Is Breckenridge Long?"	David Long	Jan Oxenberg	October 14, 2001	1AFB02
4	"Hearts and Minds"	Rod Holcomb	Rob Thomas	October 21, 2001	1AFB03
5	"In the Details"	Rod Holcomb	Dawn Prestwich & Nicole Yorkin	October 28, 2001	1AFB04
6	"Do It Yourself"	David Jones	Tom Garrigus	November 11, 2001	1AFB05
7	"Revisionism"	David Platt	Sharon Lee Watson	November 18, 2001	1AFB08
8	"A Very Great Man"	Martha Mitchell	Dianne Houston	December 2, 2001	1AFB06
9	"It's Not the Wrapping, It's the Candy"	Elodie Keene	Anya Epstein	December 9, 2001	1AFB07
10	"The Good, the Bad, and the Lawyers"	Rob Holcomb	Jan Oxenberg	January 6, 2002	1AFB10
11	"Save the Country"	Don Scardino	David Yorkin	January 13, 2002	1AFB09
12	"The Cost of Living"	David Jones	Tom Garrigus	January 20, 2002	1AFB11
13	"I Never Schlunged My Father"	Michael Schultz	Joe Cacaci	January 27, 2002	1AFB12
14	"Money Changes Everything"	Martha Mitchell	Richard Dresser	February 24, 2002	1AFB13
15	"Genesis"	Don Scardino	David Black	March 3, 2002	1AFB14
16	"An Open Book"	Matthew Penn	Story by : Grace McKeaney & Kate Milliken; Teleplay by : Grace McKeaney	March 10, 2002	1AFB15
17	"Past, Present, Future"	David Jones	Tom Garrigus	March 17, 2002	1AFB16
18	"Murder of the First"	Rob Holcomb	David Yorkin	March 31, 2002	1AFB17
19	"The Bad Girl"	David Platt	Linda Burstyn	April 14, 2002	1AFB18
20	"The Egg and I"	Michael Fields	Story by : Kate Milliken; Story & Teleplay by : Grace McKeaney	April 21, 2002	1AFB19
21	"One More Time"	Don Scardino	Joe Cacaci	May 12, 2002	1AFB21
22	"The Pursuit of Happiness"	David Platt	Story by : David Black & Lorin Dreyfuss; Teleplay by : David Black & Lorin Dreyfuss & Richard Dresser & Tom Garrigus & Joe Cacaci	June 2, 2002	1AFB20

== Reception ==
On Rotten Tomatoes, the series has an aggregated score of 79% based on 11 positive and 3 negative critic reviews. The website's consensus reads: "Bolstered by intelligent writing and a strong supporting cast, The Education of Max Bickford finds Richard Dreyfuss commanding the small screen with ease."
