= Therese Fowler =

American novelist

Therese Anne Fowler
- Born: April 22, 1967 (age 59)
- Occupation: Novelist
- Spouse: John Kessel
- Children: 2
- Website: thereseannefowler.wordpress.com

Therese Anne Fowler (born April 22, 1967) is a contemporary American author. She is best known for her novels A Good Neighborhood, A Well-Behaved Woman, and Z: A Novel of Zelda Fitzgerald, which has been adapted for television by Killer Films and Amazon Studios, with Christina Ricci and David Hoflin in the roles of Zelda and F. Scott Fitzgerald. The series, titled Z: The Beginning of Everything, was released on January 27, 2017. Her historical novel Perilous Beautiful World is scheduled for release on January 12, 2027.

Fowler is married to the author John Kessel.

== Novels ==
- Souvenir (2008), Ballantine Books, ISBN 978-0-345-49968-4
- Reunion (2009), Ballantine Books, ISBN 978-0-345-49970-7
- Exposure (2011), Ballantine Books, ISBN 978-0-345-51553-7
- Z: A Novel of Zelda Fitzgerald (2013), St. Martin's Press, ISBN 978-1-250-02865-5
- A Well-Behaved Woman: A Novel of the Vanderbilts (2018), St. Martin's Press, ISBN 978-1-250-09547-3
- A Good Neighborhood (2020), St. Martin's Press, ISBN 978-1-250-23727-9
- It All Comes Down to This (2022), St. Martin's Press, ISBN 978-1-250-27807-4
- Perilous Beautiful World (2027), Crown Fiction, ISBN 978-0-593-79898-0
