= Z: The Beginning of Everything =

American period drama television series

- Genre: Period drama
- Created by: Dawn Prestwich and Nicole Yorkin
- Starring: Christina Ricci; David Hoflin; David Strathairn
- Composer: Marcelo Zarvos
- Country of origin: United States
- Original language: English
- No. of seasons: 1
- No. of episodes: 10

Production
- Executive producers: Nicole Yorkin; Dawn Prestwich; Pamela Koffler; Christine Vachon; Christina Ricci
- Producer: Therese Anne Fowler
- Editor: Joe Klotz
- Camera setup: Tim Orr
- Running time: 27 minutes
- Production companies: Killer Films; Yorkin Prestwich; Picrow; Amazon Studios

Original release
- Network: Amazon Prime Video
- Release: November 5, 2015 – January 27, 2017

Z: The Beginning of Everything is an American period drama television series created by Dawn Prestwich and Nicole Yorkin for Amazon Studios that debuted on November 5, 2015. It is based on Z: A Novel of Zelda Fitzgerald by Therese Anne Fowler. The series presents a fictionalized version of the life of American socialite and writer Zelda Sayre Fitzgerald (Christina Ricci) in the 1920s. The first season covers her courtship by author F. Scott Fitzgerald, their subsequent marriage, and the marital tensions that arose from their lifestyle full of partying and alcohol.

The first season was released on January 27, 2017. On April 27, 2017, it was revealed that Amazon had ordered a second season. It was then announced on September 7, 2017, that Amazon had rescinded the renewal, cancelling the show after one season.

== Cast ==
=== Main cast ===
- Christina Ricci as Zelda Fitzgerald
- David Hoflin as F. Scott Fitzgerald
- David Strathairn as Judge Anthony Sayre

=== Recurring cast ===
- Christina Bennett Lind as Tallulah Bankhead
- Natalie Knepp as Eugenia Bankhead
- Kristine Nielsen as Minnie Sayre
- Holly Curran as Tilde Sayre
- Jamie Anne Allman as Tootsie Sayre
- Maya Kazan as Livye Hart
- Lucy Walters as Edna St. Vincent Millay
- Sarah Schenkkan as Eleanor Browder
- Jun Naito as Tana Fujimora
- Jordan Dean as Ludlow Fowler
- Andrew Bridges as Winston

== Episodes ==
No.	Title	Directed by	Written by	Original release date
1	"Pilot"	Tim Blake Nelson	Dawn Prestwich & Nicole Yorkin	November 5, 2015
2	"Just Humans"	Mike Barker	Nicole Yorkin & Dawn Prestwich	January 27, 2017
3	"The Right Side of Paradise"	Mike Barker	Lydia Woodward	January 27, 2017
4	"You, Me and Us"	Neasa Hardiman	Ian Deitchman & Kristin Rusk Robinson	January 27, 2017
5	"The It Girl"	Neasa Hardiman	Kit Steinkellner	January 27, 2017
6	"Lights! Camera! Fitzgerald!"	Minkie Spiro	Marcus Gardley	January 27, 2017
7	"Where There Are Friends, There Are Riches"	Minkie Spiro	Doug Dorst	January 27, 2017
8	"Playing House"	Wash Westmoreland	Ian Deitchman & Kristin Rusk Robinson	January 27, 2017
9	"Quicksand"	Wash Westmoreland	Lydia Woodward	January 27, 2017
10	"Best of All"	Mike Barker	Dawn Prestwich & Nicole Yorkin	January 27, 2017
