= Birdland (TV series) =

- Created by: Walter F. Parkes; Scott Frank
- Written by: Walter F. Parkes; Scott Frank
- Starring: Brian Dennehy; CCH Pounder; Hudson Leick; Lindsay Frost; Julio Oscar Mechoso; John Rothman; David Packer; Jeff Williams; Kevin J. O'Connor; Leslie Mann
- Composer: Dennis McCarthy
- Country of origin: United States
- Original language: English
- No. of seasons: 1
- No. of episodes: 7

Production
- Producers: Scott Frank; Walter F. Parkes
- Running time: 60 minutes
- Production companies: Aerial Pictures; Columbia Pictures Television

Original release
- Network: ABC
- Release: January 5 – April 21, 1994

Birdland is an American medical drama series created by Walter F. Parkes and Scott Frank that aired on ABC from January 5 to April 21, 1994. It was nominated for an Emmy Award for Outstanding Individual Achievement In Graphic Design And Title Sequences and an Artios Award for Best Dramatic Episodic Casting.

== Premise ==
Dr. Brian McKenzie, the chief of psychiatry at Riverview Hospital in Oakland, deals with patients while trying to juggle his own problems.

== Cast ==
- Brian Dennehy as Dr. Brian McKenzie
- CCH Pounder as Nurse Lucy
- Lindsay Frost as Dr. Jessie Lane
- Julio Oscar Mechoso as Hector
- John Rothman as Dr. Alan Bergman
- David Packer as Dr. Zuchetti
- Jeff Williams as Dr. Lewis Niles
- Kevin J. O'Connor as Mr. Horner
- Leslie Mann as Nurse Mary

== Episodes ==
No.	Title	Directed by	Written by	Original release date
1	"Pilot"	Peter Horton	Walter F. Parkes & Scott Frank	January 5, 1994
McKenzie looks into the case of a teenage accident victim.
2	"Crazy for You"	Peter Horton	Nicole Yorkin & Dawn Prestwich	January 12, 1994
McKenzie's new patient is his son's new girlfriend. A patient thinks he has x-ray vision.
3	"Plan B"	John David Coles	Walter F. Parkes & Scott Frank	January 19, 1994
The staff is taken hostage by a man who wants compensation for his wife's death.
4	"O.C.P.D. Blues"	Lesli Linka Glatter	Toni Graphia	January 26, 1994
A cop keeps having visions about shooting his partner. Horner's brother comes to take him home.
5	"Grand Delusions"	Claudia Weill	Eric Overmyer	February 9, 1994
A patient admits to killing a man. Niles tries to connect with Mary. Jessie has a malpractice suit on her hands.
6	"Sons and Mudders"	Larry Shaw	Dawn Prestwich & Nicole Yorkin	April 14, 1994
Niles suspects a politician's son of having a troubled homelife. McKenzie liquidates his assets for a bet at the race track. After an accident, a Polish bus driver has suddenly developed a French accent.
7	"Lower Than the Angels"	Lesli Linka Glatter	Walter F. Parkes & Eric Overmyer and Ann Powell & Rose Schacht	April 21, 1994
McKenzie thinks his nephew has a genetic illness. A patient turns out to be a talented painter.
