= 06:29 =

06:29 - Anatomy of a Failure 06:29 – טבח שבעה באוקטובר: המחדלים, האחראים ההשלכות
- Author: Amos Harel
- Language: Hebrew
- Subject: Background and subsequences of October 7 attacks
- Genre: Non-fiction, History, Politics
- Publisher: Kinneret Zmora-Bitan Dvir
- Publication date: May 26, 2026
- Pages: 415

06:29 - Anatomy of a Failure (Hebrew: 06:29 – טבח שבעה באוקטובר: המחדלים, האחראים, ההשלכות, in short: 06:29) is a non-fiction book about October 7th attacks and Israel's Gaza war, written by Israeli Haaretz journalist Amos Harel and published on 26 May 2026. The book offers a comprehensive investigation into IDF's strategic failures (In Hebrew: הקונספציה - The Conceptzia) that led up to the massacre and its aftermath in the Gaza Strip and in various Israeli sectors, including the military establishment, the political leadership and the media. Israeli critics have described the book as akin to a commission of inquiry into October 7 attacks.

Harel discusses the connection between the prevailing strategic assumptions of the IDF (conceptzia) that preceded the 1973 Yom Kippur War, and the assumptions that led to October 7 fifty years later. He describes the complacency, arrogance and mediocrity across both the political and security echelons in Israel. According to Harel, this manifested as a disregard for warning signs by the Israeli government (mostly led by Benjamin Netanyahu), especially during the Trial of Benjamin Netanyahu and the 2023 Israeli judicial reform protests.
