= Amos Harel =

Israeli journalist

Amos Harel עמוס הראל
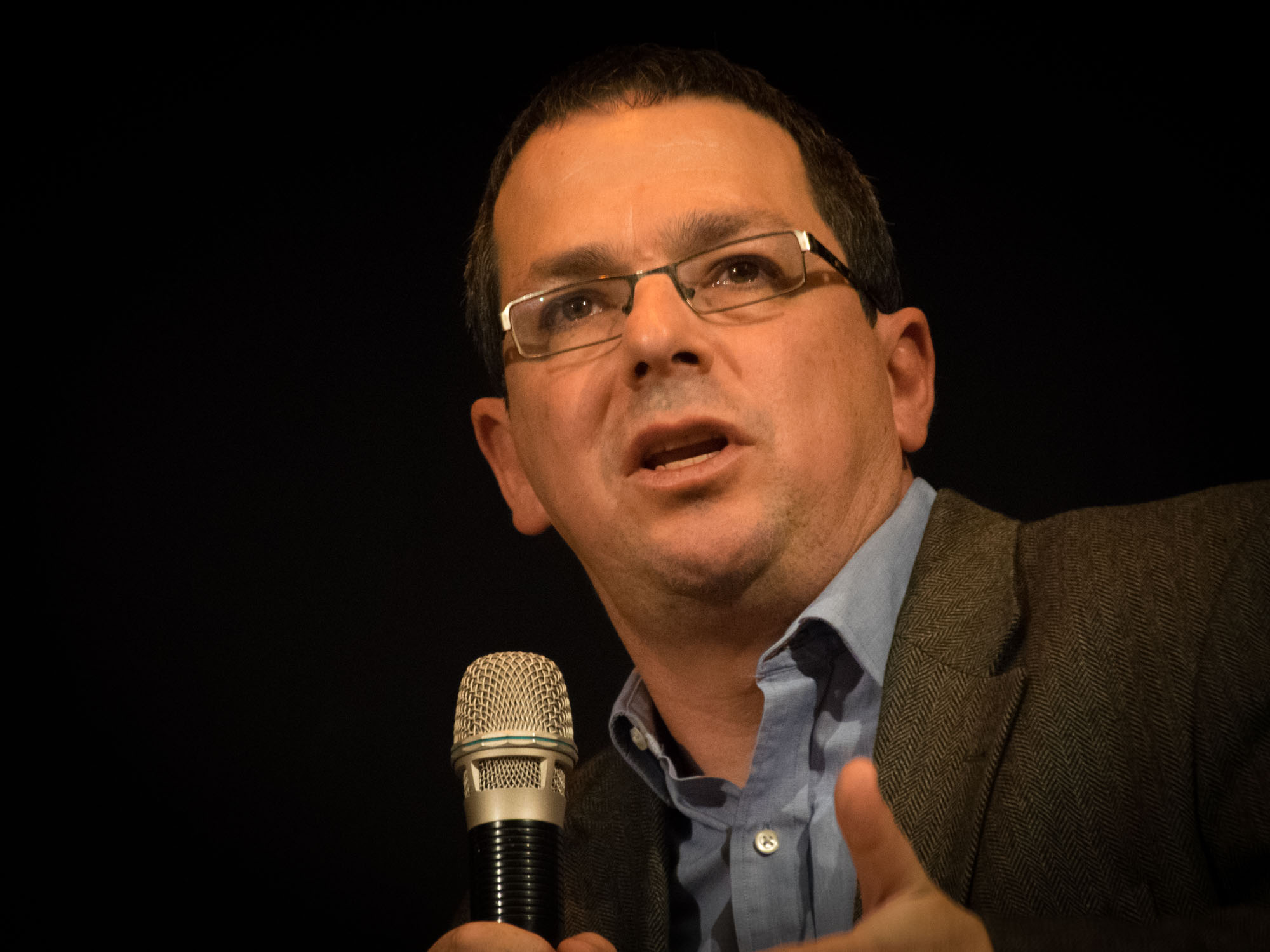
- Education: Tel Aviv University
- Occupation: Journalism

Amos Harel (Hebrew: עמוס הראל) is an Israeli journalist.

== Personal ==
Harel was born in 1968. He attended high school at Hebrew University Secondary School. He graduated from Tel Aviv University and lives in Hod Hasharon.

== Journalism career ==
As of 2025, Harel is the military and defense analyst for the Israeli newspaper Haaretz.

From 1999 to 2005, Harel anchored a weekly program about defense issues on Army Radio. Before becoming the military analyst for Haaretz, he spent four years as the night editor of the printed Hebrew edition.

== Warnings of a Third Intifada in 2022 and 2023 ==
In the year leading up to the war in Gaza, Harel's work was very critical of Itamar Ben Gvir and other far-right members of the Knesset. Harel repeatedly expressed concern that Ben Gvir's policies, provocative actions, and "chutzpah" would lead to a "third intifada".

- February 2023 - "Will far-right minister Itamar Ben-Gvir's chutzpah trigger a third intifada?"
- December 2022 - "Will Netanyahu's far-right allies ignite a third Intifada?"

This was a common concern in Israel in the year before the October 7 attacks, but went largely unnoticed except in media focused on the Middle East.

Harel did not foresee the escalation from Gaza, instead predicting increased violence in the West Bank and Jerusalem. On 6 October 2023 he wrote a piece headlined "It's Not Yet an Intifada, but the West Bank Is Heading Towards an Eruption".

== Published books ==
- The Seventh War: How we won and why we lost the war with the Palestinians. With Avi Issacharoff. 2004. Winner of the 2005 Tshetshik Prize for outstanding security research. It was translated into French and Arabic.
- 34 Days: Israel, Hezbollah and the War in Lebanon. Also with Avi Issacharoff. Hebrew edition 2006. English edition 2008 by Palgrave-Macmillan Books. Winner of the 2009 Chechic award for outstanding security research.
- 06:29 - Anatomy of a Failure Hebrew and English editions 2026 by Kinneret Zmora-Bitan Dvir publishers.

== See also ==
- Journalism in Israel
