= Avi Issacharoff =

Israeli journalist (born 1973)

- אבי יששכרוף
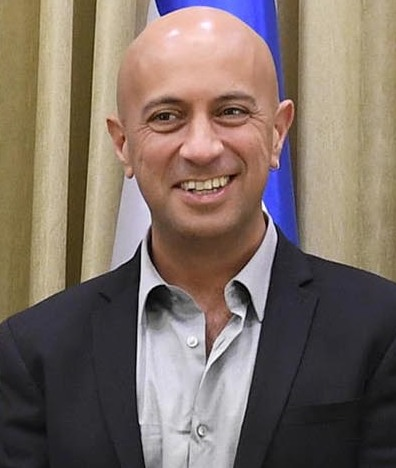
- Issacharoff in 2018
- Born: 1973 (age 52–53); Jerusalem, Israel
- Education: Ben-Gurion University of the Negev; Tel Aviv University
- Occupations: Journalist, Screenwriter
- Known for: Palestinian Affairs, Fauda
- Partner: Merav
- Children: 1

Avi Issacharoff (Hebrew: אבי יששכרוף; born 1973) is an Israeli journalist, known for his focus on Palestinian affairs. He is a Middle East commentator for The Times of Israel and its sister news outlet Walla!, and the Palestinian and Arab Affairs Correspondent for Haaretz. Issacharoff is known as one of the creators of the TV-series Fauda.

== Early life and education ==
Issacharoff was born in Jerusalem to a seventh generation Bukharian Jewish family. His ancestors were among the first inhabitants of Jerusalem's Bukharim Quarter. He grew up in the Givat Shaul neighborhood of Jerusalem and attended a Kurdish-Jewish synagogue, where he also picked up Arabic. He went on to become fluent in the language. He studied at Hebrew University High School.

During his military service in the Israel Defense Forces, he served in the Duvdevan Unit, having been placed there due to his knowledge of Arabic.

He is a graduate of Ben-Gurion University of the Negev and holds an M.A. in Middle Eastern Studies and Literature from Tel Aviv University. He has a daughter, and is in a relationship with his partner Merav.

== Media career ==
Issacharoff was Middle Eastern Affairs Correspondent for Israel Radio. In 2004, Issacharoff co-wrote with Amos Harel, The Seventh War: How we won and why we lost the war with the Palestinians, a book about the Second Intifada, winner of the 2005 Tshetshik Prize from the Israeli Institute for National Security Studies. In 2008, they wrote a second book, 34 Days: Israel, Hezbollah and the War in Lebanon, about the 2006 Lebanon War, winner of the 2009 Chechic Award.

From 2005 until 2012, he was the Palestinian and Arab affairs correspondent for the Israeli newspaper Haaretz. He is a former correspondent with Israel Radio where he won the 2002 "Best Reporter" award for his coverage of the Second Intifada. He has written and directed short documentary films broadcast on television in Israel.

In 2014, Issacharoff and a cameraman were attacked and beaten by "masked Palestinian rioters" while covering a violent protest demonstration in Beitunia. According to Issacharoff's account, the two were set upon after a Palestinian demonstrator who accused them of being Israeli intelligence agents.

He is the co-author of the Israeli television series Fauda, winner in 2016 of 6 Ophir Awards and in 2018 of another 11 Ophir Awards, granted by the Israeli Academy of Film and Television. Faraway Road Productions, which produces Fauda, was also co-founded by Issacharoff and Lior Raz, then was acquired by Candle Media in early 2022, with the continued involvement of both partners.

== Published works ==
- The Seventh War: How we won and why we lost the war with the Palestinians. with Amos Harel. 2004 (Winner of the 2005 Chechic award for outstanding security research.) It was translated into French and Arabic.
- 34 Days: Israel, Hezbollah and the War in Lebanon. With Amos Harel. Hebrew edition 2006. English Edition 2008 by Palgrave-Macmillan Books. (Winner of the 2009 Chechic award for outstanding security research.)
