= Chicago Hope =

American medical drama series (1994–2000)

- Genre: Medical drama
- Created by: David E. Kelley
- Starring: Mandy Patinkin; Héctor Elizondo; Vondie Curtis-Hall; Barbara Hershey; Christine Lahti; Peter Berg; Mark Harmon; Thomas Gibson; Rocky Carroll; Adam Arkin; Lauren Holly; Jayne Brook; E. G. Marshall
- Opening theme: "Theme from Chicago Hope" by Mark Isham
- Country of origin: United States
- Original language: English
- No. of seasons: 6
- No. of episodes: 141 (list of episodes)

Production
- Executive producers: Henry Bromell; Bill D'Elia; David E. Kelley; John Tinker
- Production locations: Los Angeles; Chicago
- Cinematography: James R. Bagdonas
- Running time: approx. 42–44 minutes
- Production companies: David E. Kelley Productions; 20th Television (1994–1995) (season 1); 20th Century Fox Television (1995–2000) (seasons 2–6)

Original release
- Network: CBS
- Release: September 18, 1994 – May 4, 2000

Related
- Picket Fences

Chicago Hope is an American medical drama television series created by David E. Kelley that originally aired for six seasons on CBS from September 18, 1994, to May 4, 2000, with a total of 141 episodes. The series is set in a fictional private charitable hospital in Chicago, Illinois.

== Overview ==
The show's ensemble cast originally starred Mandy Patinkin as Dr. Jeffrey Geiger, a hot-shot surgeon with emotional issues stemming from the psychiatric condition of his wife (played by Kim Greist), who drowned their infant son. Adam Arkin plays Dr. Aaron Shutt, a world-renowned neurosurgeon and Geiger's best friend. Thomas Gibson played Dr. Daniel Nyland, a promiscuous ER doctor and trauma surgeon who was later suspended due to his having an affair with a patient's family member and later was injured in a car crash. Dr. Keith Wilkes, played by Rocky Carroll, often clashed with Nyland and was known for his back-to-basics and rough demeanor. He was good friends with Peter Berg's character, Dr. Billy Kronk. Kronk was known for his cowboyish demeanor and to be very cocky, as shown in an episode where he cuts off a man's injured leg with a chainsaw in a scene where Kronk helps out at an accident site. Peter MacNicol, Alan Rosenberg, and Héctor Elizondo feature as the hospital's in-house attorneys and chief of staff, respectively. Christine Lahti joined in the second season as Dr. Kate Austin, a talented heart surgeon with a chip on her shoulder, vying with Geiger for the chief of surgery position. She was shown fighting in a custody battle with her malicious ex-husband and businessman, Tommy Wilmette, played by Ron Silver. Wilmette did everything he could to get Austin to lose custody of their daughter. He purchased the hospital at the end of Season 2. Dr. Austin was suspended because she and her daughter go AWOL on a trip to New Zealand for three months. In Season 3, the doctors wanted Wilmette to sell the hospital and the doctors would run it. The doctors believed that Wilmette did not know how to run a hospital and cut too many costs that involved patient care. Wilmette later met Senator Kennedy at the White House to talk about Healthcare Reform. In Season 2, Geiger resigned from Chicago Hope after trying to save Alan Birch from a deadly gunshot wound to his heart.

Geiger adopted Birch's baby daughter. Geiger later rejoined the doctors at the end of Season 5 when he became Chairman of the Board and fired half of the doctors. In Season 4, Dr. Shutt became a psychiatrist and temporarily loses his ability to operate after suffering from a brain aneurysm. In Season 6, Shutt returns to Neurosurgery and works alongside Carla Gugino's character, Dr. Gina Simon.

== Episodes ==
Chicago Hope ran six seasons, airing a total of 141 episodes.

Season	Episodes	Originally released	
Season	Episodes	First released	Last released
1	22	September 18, 1994	May 22, 1995
2	23	September 18, 1995	May 20, 1996
3	26	September 16, 1996	May 19, 1997
4	24	October 1, 1997	May 13, 1998
5	24	September 30, 1998	May 19, 1999
6	22	September 23, 1999	May 4, 2000

=== Crossovers ===
Mandy Patinkin and Héctor Elizondo brought their Chicago Hope characters to Picket Fences on November 11, 1994 ("Rebels with Causes"). In return, Fyvush Finkel appeared as his Picket Fences character on Chicago Hope ("Small Sacrifices").

Mandy Patinkin appears in an uncredited role as Geiger in a 1995 episode of NBC's Homicide: Life on the Street. Chicago Hope producer John Tinker shot this footage as a favor to his St. Elsewhere colleague Tom Fontana.

Chicago Hope characters crossed over to Early Edition early in that show's run. Rocky Carroll, Jayne Brook, and Héctor Elizondo all guest-starred in scenes taking place in the hospital.

Additionally, Chicago Hope is in the Tommy Westphall Universe.

== Characters ==
Chicago Hope cast photo (season 4)

Name	Portrayed by	Occupation	Season					
Name	Portrayed by	Occupation	1	2	3	4	5	6
Aaron Shutt	Adam Arkin	Neurosurgeon	Main					
Phillip Watters	Héctor Elizondo	Hospital Chief of Staff	Main					
Jeffrey Geiger	Mandy Patinkin	Cardiac Surgeon	Main		Recurring			Main
Danny Nyland	Thomas Gibson	E.R. surgeon, chief of trauma	Main					
Camille Shutt	Roxanne Hart	Nurse	Main					
Alan Birch	Peter MacNicol	Hospital Attorney	Main					
Arthur Thurmond	E. G. Marshall		Main					
Angela Giandamenicio	Roma Maffia		Main					
Billy Kronk	Peter Berg	E.R. Doctor	Guest	Main				
Dennis Hancock	Vondie Curtis-Hall	Clinic Physician	Guest	Main				
Diane Grad	Jayne Brook	Internal Med/Research Scientist	Guest	Main				
Kate Austin	Christine Lahti	Cardiac surgeon		Main				
John Sutton	Jamey Sheridan	OB/GYN		Main				
Keith Wilkes	Rocky Carroll	E.R. Doctor			Main			
Jack McNeil	Mark Harmon	Orthopedic Surgeon			Main			
Lisa Catera	Stacy Edwards	Neurosurgeon				Main		
Robert Yeats	Eric Stoltz						Main	
Gina Simon	Carla Gugino	Neurosurgeon						Main
Francesca Alberghetti	Barbara Hershey	Cardiac Surgeon						Main
Jeremy Hanlon	Lauren Holly	Plastic Surgeon						Main
Stuart Brickman	Alan Rosenberg	Hospital Attorney						Main

== Production ==
With the exception of some infrequent on-location scenes, the vast majority of Chicago Hope was filmed on sound stages at the studios of Twentieth Century-Fox Film Corporation, located in the Century City area of Los Angeles. Three of the cast (Harmon, Carroll and Holly) would later go on to star together in NCIS.

=== Firsts ===
The series broke a network television taboo by showing a teenager's breast after her character underwent reconstructive surgery. This was generally seen as relevant to the subject matter and went relatively uncriticized.

On November 18, 1998, Chicago Hope became the first regular series episode to be broadcast in HDTV. The episode was entitled "The Other Cheek".

Mark Harmon's character uttered the word "shit" during a trauma. Little criticism was made, although it did inspire the South Park episode It Hits the Fan.

== Broadcast ==
=== Domestic reruns ===
Reruns of Chicago Hope aired on Pop (then the TV Guide Network) from 2010 to 2012. OWN also aired reruns of Chicago Hope on a semi-regular basis.

=== International ===
In the UK and Ireland, Sky One broadcast the full series prime-time slots. BBC One broadcast from July 1995 who only screened the first 4 series, which was show in August 2000 repeats have been screened by ITV3 and Zone Romantica.

It was also shown on In Australia, the series originally aired on the Seven Network. In Germany, the first seasons were shown in the 1990s. In Hungary, the series aired on Viasat3.
In Indonesia, the series originally aired on RCTI, starting from October 1998 ended from July 2002. As of November 2013, it was airing on British channel True Entertainment. In New Zealand, the series originally aired on TV2, now TVNZ 2.

== Home media ==
Revelation Films released all 6 seasons on DVD in the UK.

DVD Name	Ep#	Release dates		
DVD Name	Ep#	Region 1	Region 2	Region 4
Season One	22	N/A	March 5, 2012	N/A
Season Two	23	N/A	July 23, 2012	N/A
Season Three	26	N/A	November 5, 2012	N/A
Season Four	24	N/A	March 18, 2013	N/A
Season Five	24	N/A	September 16, 2013	N/A
Season Six	22	N/A	July 21, 2014	N/A
The Complete Collection	141	N/A	December 14, 2015	N/A

== Reception ==
The pilot episode of Chicago Hope aired the day before NBC's ER in a special Sunday, 8 p.m. time slot. After the first week, however, the two Chicago-based hospital dramas went "head to head" in their primetime 10 p.m. Thursday night slot. ER was the victor: its first season proved a ratings winner. Despite receiving critical acclaim, Chicago Hope was shifted to 9 p.m. Thursdays, and ultimately to Monday nights in 1995 in a bid for higher ratings, while ER remained in its time slot.

Chicago Hope remained in the Monday slot and performed well, with ratings peaking at 11.9, with a 20 share. In the second season, however, Kelley and Patinkin decided to leave the show. The show was moved to Wednesdays at 10 p.m. in 1997 to make room for the Steven Bochco drama, Brooklyn South, on Mondays. In 1999, both Kelley and Patinkin returned, with a revamped cast now including Barbara Hershey and Lauren Holly, but excluding Lahti, Peter Berg, Jayne Brook, Vondie Curtis-Hall, and Stacy Edwards. CBS also moved the show back to Thursday nights, against NBC's Frasier and ABC's Who Wants to Be a Millionaire. The show was canceled in May 2000.

In 2008, former co-stars Rocky Carroll (Dr. Keith Wilkes); Mark Harmon (Dr. Jack McNeil) and Lauren Holly (Dr. Jeremy Hanlon) worked together on the series NCIS. Holly left the show after three seasons, while Carroll remains with the cast today. Harmon would depart in 2021. In addition, Carroll has a recurring role as his NCIS character, Director Leon Vance, on that series's spin off, NCIS: Los Angeles. Jayne Brook (Dr. Diane Grad) and Stacy Edwards have also guest starred on NCIS.

Thomas Gibson would later star alongside Patinkin in the highly successful Criminal Minds, as well as Shemar Moore who was a guest star on Chicago Hope during Season 4. Patinkin later left the show early in its third season.

=== Nielsen ratings ===
Seasonal rankings (based on average total viewers per episode) of Chicago Hope.

Note: Each U.S. network television season starts in late September and ends in late May, which coincides with the completion of May Nielsen ratings.

Season	Timeslot (Note: Times listed are Eastern Time)	Season premiere	Season finale	TV season	Ranking	Viewers (in millions of households)
1st	Sunday, 10:00 p.m.(episodes 1 & 9); Thursday, 10:00 p.m.(episodes 2-8); Monday, 10:00 p.m.(episodes 10-22)	September 18, 1994	May 22, 1995	1994–1995	29	11.2
2nd	Monday 10:00 p.m.	September 18, 1995	May 20, 1996	1995–1996	24	11.4
3rd	Monday 10:00 p.m.	September 16, 1996	May 19, 1997	1996–1997	30	10.2
4th	Wednesday 10:00 p.m.	October 1, 1997	May 13, 1998	1997–1998	39	8.9
5th	Wednesday 10:00 p.m.	September 30, 1998	May 19, 1999	1998–1999	73	9.9
6th	Thursday 9:00 p.m.	September 23, 1999	May 4, 2000	1999–2000	62	9.4

=== Awards and nominations ===
Over its six seasons, Chicago Hope was nominated for many accolades and won several, including seven Emmy Awards and a Golden Globe Awards.

==== Emmy awards ====
Year	Award	Recipient	Result
1995	Primetime Emmy Award for Outstanding Drama Series		Nominated
1995	Primetime Emmy Award for Outstanding Lead Actor in a Drama Series	Mandy Patinkin	Won
1995	Primetime Emmy Award for Outstanding Supporting Actor in a Drama Series	Hector Elizondo	Nominated
1995	Primetime Emmy Award for Outstanding Directing for a Drama Series	Lou Antonio for "Life Support"	Nominated
1995	Outstanding Cinematography for a Series	Tim Suhrstedt for the episode "Over The Rainbow"	Won
1995	Outstanding Editing for a Series – Single Camera Production	Lori Jane Coleman for "Pilot"	Nominated
1995	Outstanding Editing for a Series – Single Camera Production	Randy Roberts for "The Quarantine"	Nominated
1995	Outstanding Sound Mixing for a Drama Series	David Kirschner, Robert Appere, and Kenneth R. Burton for "Internal Affairs"	Nominated
1995	Primetime Emmy Award for Outstanding Original Main Title Theme Music	Mark Isham	Nominated
1996	Primetime Emmy Award for Outstanding Drama Series		Nominated
1996	Primetime Emmy Award for Outstanding Casting for a Series	Debi Manwiller	Won
1996	Primetime Emmy Award for Outstanding Lead Actress in a Drama Series	Christine Lahti	Nominated
1996	Primetime Emmy Award for Outstanding Supporting Actor in a Drama Series	Hector Elizondo	Nominated
1996	Primetime Emmy Award for Outstanding Directing for a Drama Series	Jeremy Kagan for the episode "Leave Of Absence"	Won
1996	Primetime Emmy Award for Outstanding Guest Actor in a Drama Series	Richard Pryor	Nominated
1996	Primetime Emmy Award for Outstanding Guest Actor in a Drama Series	Michael Jeter	Nominated
1996	Primetime Emmy Award for Outstanding Guest Actor in a Drama Series	Rip Torn	Nominated
1996	Primetime Emmy Award for Outstanding Guest Actress in a Drama Series	Carol Kane	Nominated
1996	Outstanding Cinematography for a Series	Kenneth Zunder for "Leave of Absence"	Nominated
1996	Outstanding Editing for a Series – Single Camera Production	Jim Stewart for "Leave of Absence"	Nominated
1996	Outstanding Hairstyling for a Series	Mary Ann Valdes, Dione Taylor for "Right to Life"	Nominated
1996	Outstanding Makeup for a Series	Norman T. Leavitt, Coree Lear, Bari Dreiband-Burman, & Thomas R. Burman for "Quiet Riot"	Nominated
1996	Primetime Emmy Award for Outstanding Original Main Title Theme Music	Mark Isham	Nominated
1996	Outstanding Sound Mixing for a Drama Series	Russell C. Fager, R. Russell Smith, Greg Orloff for "Quiet Riot"	Nominated
1997	Primetime Emmy Award for Outstanding Drama Series		Nominated
1997	Primetime Emmy Award for Outstanding Lead Actress in a Drama Series	Christine Lahti	Nominated
1997	Primetime Emmy Award for Outstanding Supporting Actor in a Drama Series	Héctor Elizondo	Won
1997	Primetime Emmy Award for Outstanding Supporting Actor in a Drama Series	Adam Arkin	Nominated
1997	Primetime Emmy Award for Outstanding Guest Actor in a Drama Series	Alan Arkin	Nominated
1997	Primetime Emmy Award for Outstanding Guest Actress in a Drama Series	Isabella Rossellini	Nominated
1997	Outstanding Cinematography for a Series – Single Camera Production	James R. Bagdonas for "A Time To Kill"	Nominated
1997	Outstanding Editing for a Series – Single Camera Production	Alec Smight, Mark C. Baldwin, Augie Hess for "Days of the Rope"	Nominated
1997	Outstanding Sound Editing for a Series		Nominated
1998	Primetime Emmy Award for Outstanding Lead Actress in a Drama Series	Christine Lahti	Won
1998	Primetime Emmy Award for Outstanding Directing for a Drama Series	Bill D'Elia for "Brain Salad Surgery"	Nominated
1998	Primetime Emmy Award for Outstanding Supporting Actor in a Drama Series	Hector Elizondo	Nominated
1998	Outstanding Editing for a Series – Single Camera Production	Alec Smight for "Brain Salad Surgery"	Nominated
1998	Outstanding Cinematography for a Series – Single Camera Production	James R. Bagdonas for "Brain Salad Surgery"	Nominated
1998	Outstanding Sound Mixing for a Drama Series	Russell C. Fager, R. Russell Smith, and William Freesh for the episode "Brain Salad Surgery"	Won
1999	Primetime Emmy Award for Outstanding Lead Actress in a Drama Series	Christine Lahti	Nominated
1999	Primetime Emmy Award for Outstanding Guest Actor in a Drama Series	Mandy Patinkin	Nominated
1999	Outstanding Cinematography for a Series – Single Camera Production	James R. Bagdonas for "Home Is Where The Heartache Is"	Nominated

==== Golden Globe Awards ====
Year	Award	Recipient	Result
1995	Golden Globe Award for Best Television Series – Drama		Nominated
1995	Golden Globe Award for Best Actor – Television Series Drama	Mandy Patinkin	Nominated
1996	Golden Globe Award for Best Television Series – Drama		Nominated
1997	Golden Globe Award for Best Television Series – Drama		Nominated
1997	Golden Globe Award for Best Actress – Television Series Drama	Christine Lahti	Nominated
1998	Golden Globe Award for Best Television Series – Drama		Nominated
1998	Golden Globe Award for Best Actress – Television Series Drama	Christine Lahti	Won

==== Screen Actors Guild Award ====
Year	Award	Recipient	Result
1995	Screen Actors Guild Award for Outstanding Performance by an Ensemble in a Drama Series		Nominated
1995	Screen Actors Guild Award for Outstanding Performance by a Male Actor in a Drama Series	Mandy Patinkin	Nominated
1995	Screen Actors Guild Award for Outstanding Performance by a Male Actor in a Drama Series	Hector Elizondo	Nominated
1996	Screen Actors Guild Award for Outstanding Performance by an Ensemble in a Drama Series		Nominated
1996	Screen Actors Guild Award for Outstanding Performance by a Female Actor in a Drama Series	Christine Lahti	Nominated
1997	Screen Actors Guild Award for Outstanding Performance by an Ensemble in a Drama Series		Nominated
1997	Screen Actors Guild Award for Outstanding Performance by a Female Actor in a Drama Series	Christine Lahti	Nominated
1998	Screen Actors Guild Award for Outstanding Performance by an Ensemble in a Drama Series		Nominated
1998	Screen Actors Guild Award for Outstanding Performance by a Female Actor in a Drama Series	Christine Lahti	Nominated
1999	Screen Actors Guild Award for Outstanding Performance by a Female Actor in a Drama Series	Christine Lahti	Nominated

==== Other awards ====
Year	Award	Category	Nominee(s)	Work	Result
1998	ALMA Awards	Outstanding Individual Performance in a Television Series in a Crossover Role	Hector Elizondo		Nominated
1999	ALMA Awards	Outstanding Drama Series			Nominated
1999	ALMA Awards	Outstanding Individual Performance in a Television Series in a Crossover Role	Hector Elizondo		Nominated
2000	ALMA Awards	Outstanding Actor in a Drama Series	Hector Elizondo		Won
1998	American Choreography Awards	Outstanding Achievement in Television – Episodic	Kenny Ortega		Won
1995	American Cinema Editors Awards	Best Edited One-Hour Series for Television	Lori Jane Coleman	"Pilot"	Won
1996	American Cinema Editors Awards	Best Edited One-Hour Series for Television	Alec Smight	"Love and Hope"	Nominated
1996	American Cinema Editors Awards	Best Edited One-Hour Series for Television	Randy Roberts	"The Quarantine"	Nominated
1997	American Cinema Editors Awards	Best Edited One-Hour Series for Television	Randy Roberts	"Transplanted Affection"	Won
1999	American Cinema Editors Awards	Best Edited One-Hour Series for Television	Alec Smight	"Gun With The Wind"	Nominated
1995	American Society of Cinematographers	Outstanding Achievement in Cinematography in Regular Series	Tim Suhrstedt		Nominated
1996	American Society of Cinematographers	Outstanding Achievement in Cinematography in Regular Series	Kenneth Zunder	"Leave of Absence"	Nominated
1997	American Society of Cinematographers	Outstanding Achievement in Cinematography in Regular Series	James R. Bagdonas	"Time to Kill"	Nominated
1998	American Society of Cinematographers	Outstanding Achievement in Cinematography in Regular Series	James R. Bagdonas	"Hope Against Hope"	Nominated
1995	Casting Society of America	Best Casting for TV, Dramatic Episodic	Steve Jacobs		Nominated
1996	Casting Society of America	Best Casting for TV, Dramatic Episodic	Debi Manwiller		Nominated
1997	Casting Society of America	Best Casting for TV, Dramatic Episodic	Debi Manwiller		Nominated
1997	Cinema Audio Society Awards	Outstanding Achievement in Sound Mixing for a Television Series	Greg Orloff, R. Russell Smith, Russell C. Fager	"Quiet Riot"	Nominated
1998	Cinema Audio Society Awards	Outstanding Achievement in Sound Mixing for a Television Series	R. Russell Smith, William Freesh, Russell C. Fager	"Brain Salad Surgery"	Won
1999	Cinema Audio Society Awards	Outstanding Achievement in Sound Mixing for a Television Series	R. Russell Smith, William Freesh, Russell C. Fager	"100 and One Damnations"	Nominated
1995	Directors Guild of America Award	Directors Guild of America Award for Outstanding Directing – Drama Series	Michael Pressman	"Pilot"	Nominated
1997	GLAAD Media Award	Outstanding TV Drama Series			Won
1999	GLAAD Media Award	Outstanding TV Drama Series			Won
2001	GLAAD Media Award	Outstanding TV Individual Episode (In a Series Without A Regular Gay Character)		"Boys Will Be Girls"	Nominated
1997	Satellite Awards	Satellite Award for Best Television Series – Drama			Nominated
1997	Satellite Awards	Satellite Award for Best Actress – Television Series Drama	Christine Lahti		Won
1997	Satellite Awards	Satellite Award for Best Actor – Television Series Drama	Hector Elizondo		Nominated
1999	YoungStar Award	Best Performance by a Young Actress in a Drama TV Series	Mae Whitman		Nominated
