= State of Independence (Homeland) =

- Homeland episode
- Episode no.: Season 2 Episode 3
- Directed by: Lodge Kerrigan
- Written by: Alexander Cary
- Production code: 2WAH03
- Original air date: October 14, 2012
- Running time: 54 minutes

Guest appearances
- Nasser Faris as Bassel; Hrach Titizian as Danny Galvez; James Rebhorn as Frank Mathison; Marc Menchaca as Lauder Wakefield; Zuleikha Robinson as Roya Hammad; Talia Balsam as Cynthia Walden

Episode chronology
← Previous "Beirut Is Back"	Next → "New Car Smell"
- Homeland season 2

"State of Independence" is the third episode of the second season of the American television drama series Homeland, and the 15th episode overall. It originally aired on Showtime on October 14, 2012.

== Plot ==
Saul (Mandy Patinkin) is stopped while boarding a flight home from Beirut Airport and questioned by a man implied to be an intelligence officer. Despite claiming diplomatic immunity, Saul is forced to open his diplomatic bag, where the officer finds a memory card hidden in the lining. Saul is released and, once aboard the plane, retrieves the real memory card (containing Brody's confession tape) from a hidden compartment in his briefcase handle.

Carrie (Claire Danes) stays up all night writing a report on her mission in Beirut. The next morning, Galvez (Hrach Titizian) collects it and instructs her to come to Langley for a debriefing. When Carrie arrives early, she learns the session has already begun without her. Estes (David Harewood) tells her he chose to proceed without her involvement. He praises her work but definitively denies reinstating her, leaving her shaken and upset.

On the day of Jessica's (Morena Baccarin) fundraiser for veterans, Brody (Damian Lewis) is contacted by Roya (Zuleikha Robinson), who says the CIA has identified the tailor in Gettysburg who made Brody's suicide vest. Roya orders Brody to retrieve him and bring him to a safehouse, as the tailor only knows Brody. Brody picks up the reluctant tailor, who says his name is Bassel, and drives back, delayed by a flat tire. While Brody changes it, Bassel briefly considers attacking him.

At a gas station, Bassel suddenly flees into the woods. He strikes Brody with a rock, but Brody catches him, discovering he has been impaled on a stake. Bassel begs for a hospital, but Brody refuses and tries to stop the bleeding. When Jessica calls, Brody claims the delay is due to the flat tire. Hearing Bassel's moans and fearing exposure, Brody kills him by snapping his neck.

After leaving her father's house, Carrie returns to her apartment, swallows a large number of pills with wine, then panics and forces herself to vomit.

At the fundraiser, Jessica gives a speech in Brody's place, describing the family's struggles after his return from captivity and proposing an initiative to help reintegrate returning veterans. The speech is well received. Brody buries the tailor and returns home late. Mike (Diego Klattenhoff) drives Jessica home, where she vents her anger and reveals Brody's affair with Carrie. Brody finally returns, and Jessica demands honesty, warning their marriage cannot continue this way.

Saul later arrives at Carrie's apartment straight from Lebanon with the recovered intelligence. Watching Brody's confession video, Carrie is overwhelmed and declares, “I was right!”

== Production ==
The episode was written by executive producer Alexander Cary, and was directed by Lodge Kerrigan, director of the feature film Keane which also starred Damian Lewis.

== Reception ==
=== Ratings ===
The original American broadcast received 1.48 million viewers, which decreased in viewership from the previous episode.

=== Critical response ===
HitFix's Alan Sepinwall called it a "great episode" and "an early contender for Claire Danes' next Emmy submission". In summary, Sepinwall said that "the plot on 'Homeland' may occasionally not work, but these characters at the center of it are so compelling that it's often all that really matters".

Emily VanDerWerff of The A.V. Club graded the episode a "B", feeling that Carrie's scenes were expertly done, but that the developments in Brody's storyline were too contrived.

The Washington Post's Ned Martel hailed the performance of Claire Danes as "beyond great", and said that "three episodes and three weeks after she took home the industry’s big prize, it already feels like time to give Claire Danes next year’s award too."

=== Awards and nominations ===
Morena Baccarin received a nomination for the Primetime Emmy Award for Outstanding Supporting Actress in a Drama Series at the 65th Primetime Emmy Awards for her performance in this episode.
