= Homeland season 2 =

Season of television series

Homeland
- Season 2
- DVD cover art
- Starring: Claire Danes; Damian Lewis; Morena Baccarin; David Harewood; Diego Klattenhoff; Jamey Sheridan; David Marciano; Navid Negahban; Jackson Pace; Morgan Saylor; Mandy Patinkin
- No. of episodes: 12

Release
- Original network: Showtime
- Original release: September 30 – December 16, 2012

Season chronology
- ← Previous; Season 1 Next → Season 3

The second season of the American television drama series Homeland premiered on September 30, 2012 on Showtime and concluded on December 16, 2012, consisting of 12 episodes. The series is loosely based on the Israeli television series Hatufim (English: Prisoners of War) created by Gideon Raff and is developed for American television by Howard Gordon and Alex Gansa.

Set in the aftermath of Season 1, Carrie Mathison is now on leave from the CIA. However, she is recruited for an operation in Beirut by mentor Saul Berenson, resulting in their securing of conclusive proof that Nicholas Brody has been turned by al-Qaeda and is working against the United States. All the while, Brody becomes closer and closer to the Vice President as he enters into politics.

== Cast and characters ==
=== Main ===
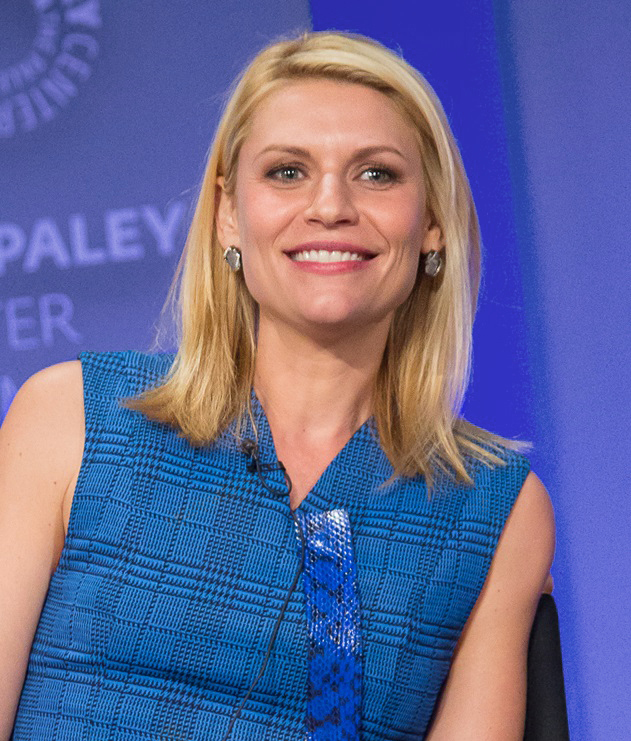
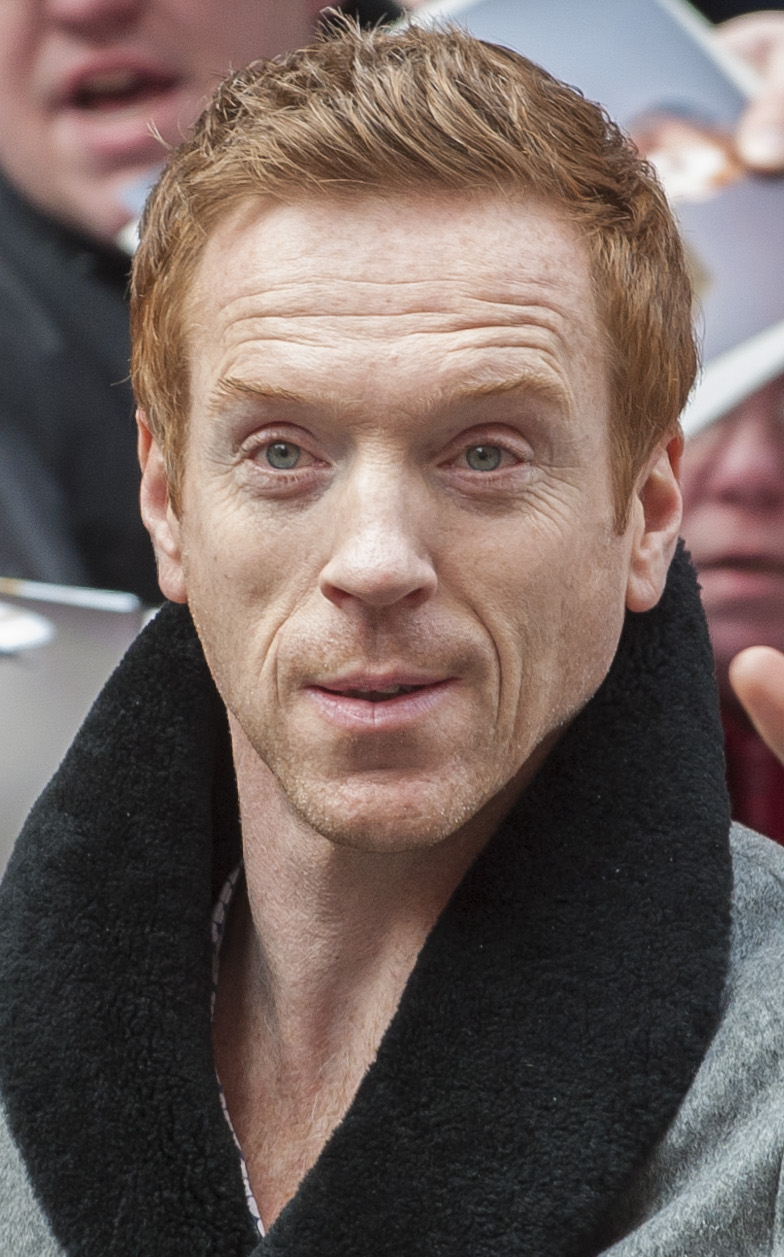
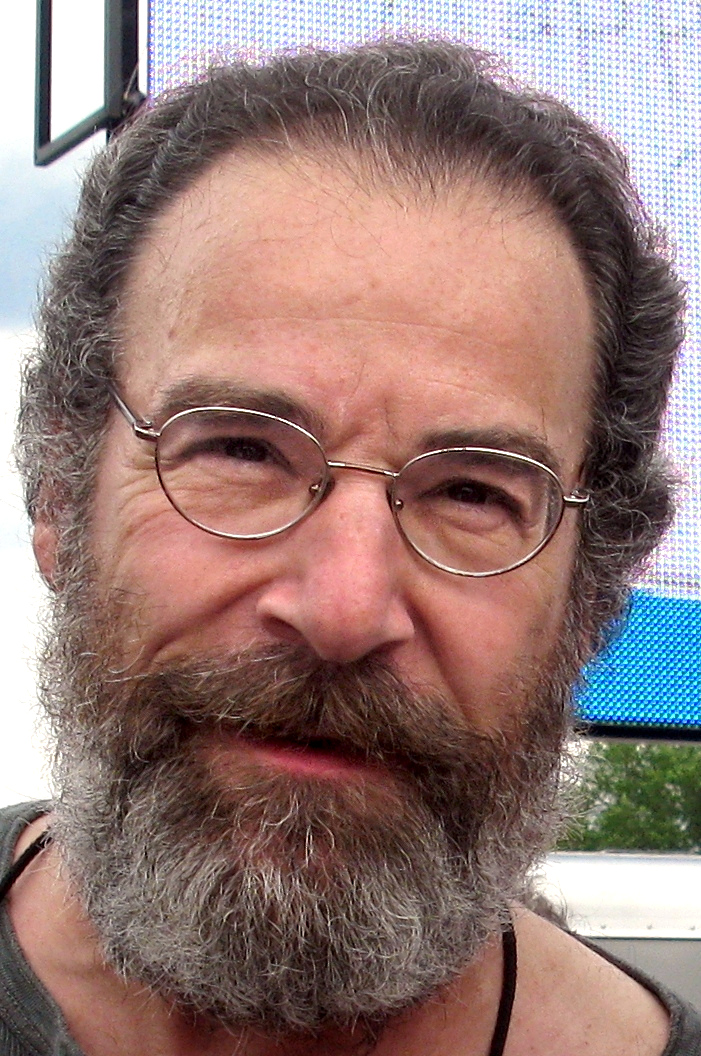
Claire Danes, Damian Lewis and Mandy Patinkin (left to right) portray lead roles Carrie Mathison, Nicholas Brody and Saul Berenson, respectively.
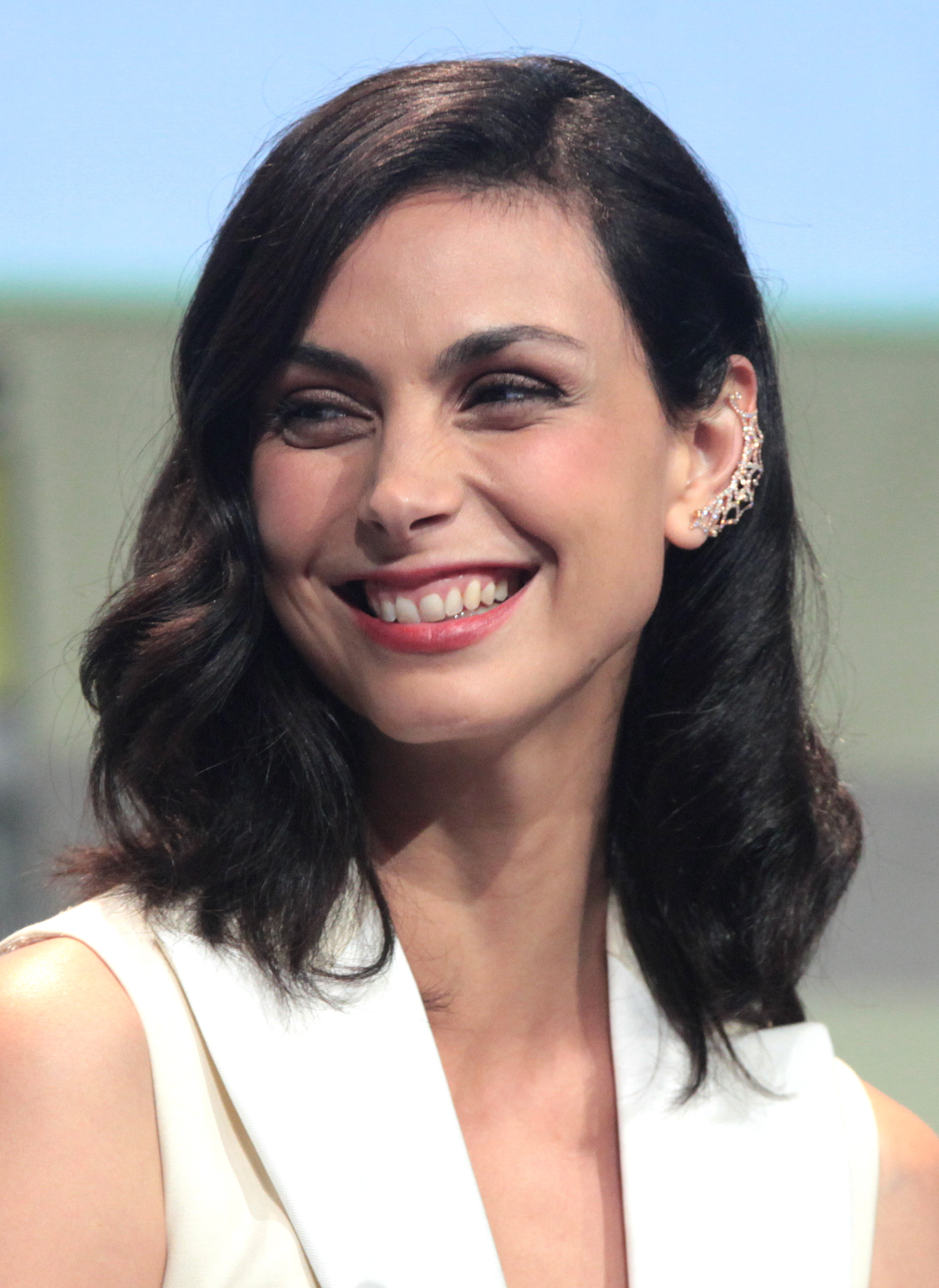
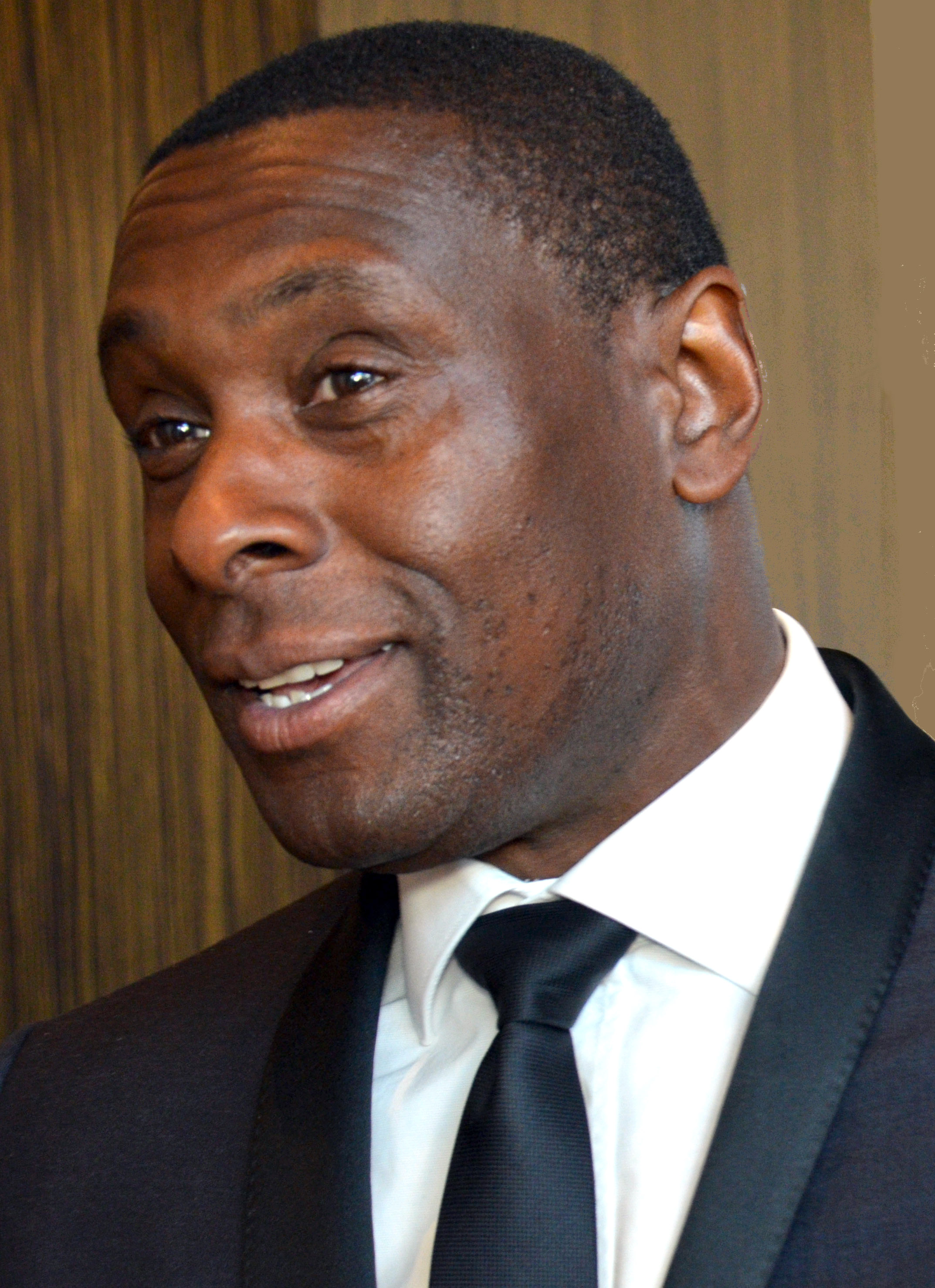
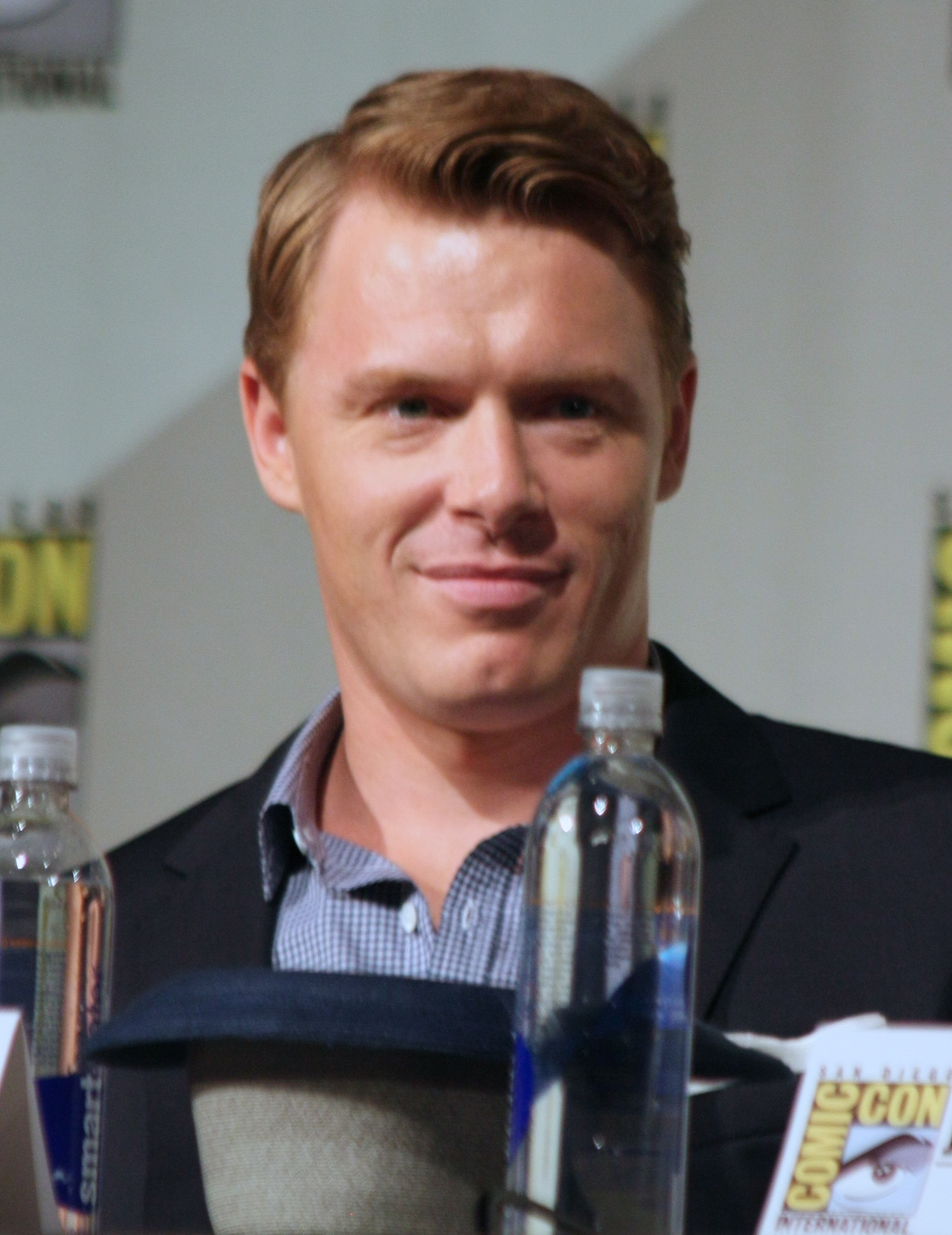
Morena Baccarin, David Harewood and Diego Klattenhoff (left to right) portray Jessica Brody, David Estes and Mike Faber, respectively.
- Claire Danes as Carrie Mathison, a CIA intelligence officer assigned to the Counterterrorism Center
- Damian Lewis as Nicholas Brody, a U.S. Marine Sergeant and a Marine Scout Sniper who was rescued by Delta Force after being held by al-Qaeda as a prisoner of war for eight years
- Morena Baccarin as Jessica Brody, Nicholas Brody's wife
- David Harewood as David Estes, the Director of the CIA's Counterterrorism Center and Carrie's boss
- Diego Klattenhoff as Mike Faber, a U.S. Marine Major (formerly Captain). He was Nicholas' best friend who, assuming Nicholas was dead, began an affair with his wife, Jessica Brody.
- Jamey Sheridan as William Walden, Vice President of the United States and former director of the CIA
- David Marciano as Virgil, Carrie's contact aiding in the surveillance of Brody
- Navid Negahban as Abu Nazir, a high-ranking member of al-Qaeda
- Jackson Pace as Chris Brody, Nicholas Brody's son
- Morgan Saylor as Dana Brody, Nicholas Brody's daughter
- Mandy Patinkin as Saul Berenson, the CIA's Middle-East Division Chief and Carrie's old boss and mentor

=== Recurring ===
- Hrach Titizian as Danny Galvez, a CIA agent of Guatemalan and Lebanese origin
- Zuleikha Robinson as Roya Hammad, a journalist and Brody's handler on behalf of Abu Nazir
- Valerie Cruz as Major Joy Mendez
- Timothée Chalamet as Finn Walden, son of the Vice President and Dana's romantic interest
- Talia Balsam as Cynthia Walden, wife of the Vice President
- Marc Menchaca as Lauder Wakefield, a former Marine suspicious of Brody
- Maury Sterling as Max Piotrowski, Virgil's brother who also aids in the surveillance of Brody
- Rupert Friend as Peter Quinn, a CIA analyst
- Mido Hamada as M.M., Abu Nazir's munitions specialist

=== Guest ===
- Amy Hargreaves as Maggie Mathison, Carrie's sister and a psychiatrist
- James Rebhorn as Frank Mathison, Carrie's father
- Clara Khoury as Fatima Ali, Carrie's contact in Beirut
- Tim Guinee as Scott Ryan, CIA special ops chief
- Larry Pine as Richard Halsted, the United States Secretary of Defense
- Nasser Faris as Bassel, the tailor in Gettysburg who stitched Brody's suicide vest
- Seth Gilliam as Chapman
- Marin Ireland as Aileen Morgan, an imprisoned anti-American terrorist
- John Finn as Rex Henning, an ex-soldier and major donor to Walden's presidential campaign
- Victor Slezak as Warden Jack Prithard, who presides over the prison where Aileen Morgan is held
- F. Murray Abraham as Dar Adal, a retired black ops specialist
- Daniella Pineda as Julia Diaz, Quinn's ex and the mother of his child
- James Urbaniak as Larry, the CIA's polygraph administrator
- Chance Kelly as Mitchell Clawson
- Sarita Choudhury as Mira Berenson, Saul's wife who is often out of the country.
- Billy Smith as FBI Special Agent Hall
- John Cariani as Jeff Ricker

== Episodes ==
No. overall	No. in season	Title	Directed by	Written by	Original release date	Prod. code	U.S. viewers (millions)
13	1	"The Smile"	Michael Cuesta	Alex Gansa & Howard Gordon	September 30, 2012	2WAH01	1.73
Six months after the first season, tensions rise in the Middle East when Iran vows retaliation for Israel's bombing of their nuclear sites. Carrie, adjusting to life outside the CIA, is asked by Estes and later Saul to extract information from one of her assets in Beirut, who claims to have information on an imminent attack on America. Carrie reluctantly agrees, and successfully evades Lebanese surveillance on her way to meet her contact. Walden approaches Brody as a potential running mate in the former's presidential campaign. Brody accepts, and is later tasked by his new Al-Qaeda handler, White House correspondent Roya Hammad, to retrieve a CIA hitlist from Estes' office. Dana accidentally lets slip at school that her father is a Muslim, leading Jessica to find out herself and confront Brody.
14	2	"Beirut Is Back"	Michael Cuesta	Chip Johannessen	October 7, 2012	2WAH02	1.66
Carrie travels to Beirut to meet up with her asset, Fatima, who gives her information on Abu Nazir meeting with Fatima's husband, the head of Hezbollah. Saul and Estes doubt Carrie's judgment, but Saul ultimately authorizes a mission to eliminate Nazir. During the meet, Brody – who is present in the situation room observing the operation – covertly tips off Nazir, allowing him to narrowly escape. While transporting Fatima to safety, Carrie breaks protocol by searching Fatima's apartment for her husband's connections, narrowly evading a mob on the way back. Saul discovers a hidden compartment in a bag Carrie retrieved from the apartment, and is stunned to find a memory card containing Brody's recorded confession to his planned suicide attack.
15	3	"State of Independence"	Lodge Kerrigan	Alexander Cary	October 14, 2012	2WAH03	1.48
Brody learns from Roya that the CIA is onto the tailor in Gettysburg who crafted Brody's suicide vest, and is tasked with transporting the man to a safehouse. Because of the mission, Brody is unable to attend Jessica's planned fundraiser for veterans; Jessica gives a speech in his place, which is well-received. During a stop, the tailor, Bassel, attempts to escape; Brody ultimately kills him during a struggle. Saul returns to the U.S. and shows Carrie the video he obtained of Brody's confession; Carrie realizes her suspicions were correct all along.
16	4	"New Car Smell"	David Semel	Meredith Stiehm	October 21, 2012	2WAH04	1.75
Carrie, Saul and Estes set up surveillance of Brody at a CIA safehouse; Estes places analyst Peter Quinn in charge of the operation, and reinstates Carrie to the CIA. Jessica demands that Brody either tell the truth or leave the house; Brody takes the latter option and books a night at a hotel. Under surveillance from Quinn's team, Carrie visits Brody at the hotel bar and has a friendly conversation with him. Pushing to obtain a confession, Carrie disobeys orders and goes up to Brody's room, where she accuses him of being a terrorist and a traitor. As a confrontation is about to ensue, Saul's team breaks into the room and arrests Brody.
17	5	"Q&A"	Lesli Linka Glatter	Henry Bromell	October 28, 2012	2WAH05	2.07
Brody is brought to a safehouse to be interrogated. Quinn questions him first; Brody admits his love for Issa and animosity towards Walden, but denies wearing a suicide vest, leading Quinn to stab him the hand with a knife. Carrie takes over the interrogation, shuts off the cameras, and uses her personal connection with Brody to gradually disarm him. Brody ultimately admits to wearing the vest, reveals that Abu Nazir is planning an attack on the U.S., and gives up the names of his contacts, including Roya. Carrie recruits Brody as the CIA's asset against Nazir. Dana goes on a date with Finn Walden, the vice president's son, but he hits a pedestrian with his car and they flee the scene.
18	6	"A Gettysburg Address"	Guy Ferland	Chip Johannessen	November 4, 2012	2WAH06	1.74
The CIA monitors Roya, who meets with an unknown man while avoiding surveillance. Brody informs the team that the Gettysburg tailor is dead; Carrie and Quinn send a team to the shop to pull the surveillance and investigate it for forensics. However, Nazir's men, led by Roya's contact, ambush the shop, killing several officers and wounding Quinn; they extract a large case from the shop. Brody denies his knowledge of the ambush to Carrie. Mike independently investigates Brody; despite being talked down by the CIA, he learns that Brody killed Walker. Dana visits the hospital to check on the woman she and Finn hit on the road, and learns that she has died of her injuries.
19	7	"The Clearing"	John Dahl	Meredith Stiehm	November 11, 2012	2WAH07	1.91
Brody admits to Jessica that he killed Walker, characterizing it as a botched CIA mission. Saul visits Aileen Morgan in prison in hopes of identifying Roya's contact; however, the information turns out to be a hoax, and Aileen is found to have committed suicide. Brody attends a political fundraiser hosted by a major donor to Walden's campaign, who endorses Brody as Walden's running mate. Dana admits to her parents that she and Finn were involved in a hit-and-run and decides to report it to the police despite the Waldens' insistence on covering it up; Brody accompanies her, but Carrie forbids him from filing the report, as it would cause tensions between him and Walden and thus jeopardize his relationship with Nazir. Dana runs away.
20	8	"I'll Fly Away"	Michael Cuesta	Story by : Howard Gordon & Chip Johannessen; Teleplay by : Chip Johannessen	November 18, 2012	2WAH08	1.87
Dana spends the night at Mike's, and the next day visits the family of the woman Finn killed; the eldest daughter, who is being paid off, tells her to drop it and go away. Brody tells Roya he is through and goes into hiding with Carrie, who convinces him to remain committed to helping her; the two have sex while the CIA listens in. The following day, Brody calls Roya to make amends; the two meet at a remote location that night, where they are picked up a helicopter. Brody is taken to meet with Abu Nazir, who is now in the U.S.
21	9	"Two Hats"	Dan Attias	Alexander Cary	November 25, 2012	2WAH09	2.02
Brody finally surfaces after 12 hours, revealing that Nazir is in the U.S. and plotting an attack on a military homecoming event hosted by Walden and covered by Roya. Brody's family (along with Mike) is placed under CIA protection; Jessica and Mike rekindle their relationship. Saul investigates Quinn and learns that he in fact reports to black ops specialist Dar Adal, Saul's former colleague. The CIA follows through on Brody's information and successfully foils the terror plot, arresting Roya in the process but failing to capture Nazir. Quinn is revealed to have been ordered by Estes to assassinate Brody had Nazir been caught.
22	10	"Broken Hearts"	Guy Ferland	Henry Bromell	December 2, 2012	2WAH10	2.20
Abu Nazir kidnaps Carrie and uses her as leverage to force Brody to give him the serial number for Walden's pacemaker. Brody breaks into Walden's office and provides Nazir the number in exchange for Carrie's freedom. One of Nazir's men uses the number to hack into Walden's pacemaker and induce a lethal heart attack, which occurs as Brody tells Walden he is withdrawing his candidacy for Vice President and rebuffs him as he dies. Saul meets with Dar Adal to discuss Quinn's involvement in Estes' operation, and accuses Estes of plotting to assassinate Brody to mask his own complicity in the drone strike that killed Issa. Estes later has Saul detained in an interrogation room. Carrie returns without backup to the abandoned mill where Nazir held her, believing he is still hiding there.
23	11	"In Memoriam"	Jeremy Podeswa	Chip Johannessen	December 9, 2012	2WAH11	2.36
CIA and FBI teams search the mill where Nazir held Carrie, but come up short. Carrie interrogates Roya; though Roya does not cooperate, Carrie senses from her answers that Nazir may indeed be hiding in the mill, and orders a second SWAT search of the premises. They find a hidden room from which Nazir emerges, kills a SWAT officer, and chases down Carrie until he is cornered and commits suicide by cop. Estes orders Quinn to go through with killing Brody in the wake of Nazir's death. Brody and his family are debriefed on Nazir's death and released back home. Brody and Jessica amicably separate; Brody goes to visit Carrie, with Quinn watching them from afar.
24	12	"The Choice"	Michael Cuesta	Alex Gansa & Meredith Stiehm	December 16, 2012	2WAH12	2.29
Carrie and Brody spend another night at her weekend cabin, where Carrie realizes she must choose between her relationship with Brody and her career at the CIA. Quinn tracks them, but relents from killing Brody, realizing that it would serve no use but to protect Estes at the cost of Carrie's wellbeing. Saul is released from his detention by Estes and attends Abu Nazir's burial at sea. Carrie and Brody attend Walden's memorial service at Langley, where the two decide to be with one another; however, they notice Brody's car parked outside the building right before a bomb goes off, killing over 200 people including Estes, the Waldens, and several Cabinet members. Al-Qaeda takes responsibility for the attack and releases Brody's confession video to the public, framing him as the culprit. Saul arrives at the scene of the bombing and learns he has been named Acting Director due to Estes' death. Carrie procures fake passports for herself and Brody and helps him escape across the Canadian border, vowing to clear his name. She decides not to run away with him and instead returns to Langley, where she reunites with Saul.

== Production ==
Showtime renewed the series for a second season of 12 episodes on October 26, 2011.

Production for the season began in May 2012, with the first two episodes being filmed in Israel, which doubles as Beirut, where the episodes take place.

The second season has three season one recurring actors–David Marciano, Navid Negahban, and Jamey Sheridan–being promoted to series regulars. Actor Rupert Friend joined the cast playing Peter Quinn, a CIA analyst; he was originally reported to be a series regular, but he is credited as a guest star.

== Reception ==
=== Reviews ===
On Rotten Tomatoes, the season has an approval rating of 93% with an average score of 8.6 out of 10 based on 42 reviews. The website's critical consensus reads, "Homeland is proving itself one of the best thrillers on television, as its second season ratchets up the tension and benefits from increased chemistry between its stars." The second season of Homeland scored a Metacritic rating of 96 out of 100 based on 21 reviews. Based on aggregation of television critics' top-ten lists, the season was ranked as the second best television show of 2012 by HitFix, and third best by Metacritic. TV Guide named it the best television show of 2012.

Dorothy Rabinowitz of The Wall Street Journal observed that the show is more relevant than ever given recent world events, and proclaimed that "Television's best drama series is, in short, back with all that was delectable about season one on vivid display again—first-class writing, sterling performances, rocketing suspense".

David Wiegand of the San Francisco Chronicle felt that Season 2 delivered on extremely high expectations and maintained the show's level of writing, acting, and tension.

TV Guide's Matt Roush praised the "powerhouse performances" by Claire Danes and Damian Lewis, as well as the relentless pace of the writing.

USA Today's Robert Bianco gave the season a 4/4 score, calling it "unmissable TV", and said that even with the expertly crafted plot, Homeland's biggest strength is in its characters.

Brian Lowry of Variety wrote a positive review, noting that there are some plot points that strain plausibility, but that "once the narrative begins hitting its stride in the second episode, it's clear the program remains on a rarefied creative tier".

=== Awards and nominations ===
Homeland won three awards at the 70th Golden Globe Awards, including for Best Drama Series, which it won the previous year. Claire Danes and Damian Lewis each won for Best Performance in a Television Series – Drama, with Mandy Patinkin receiving a nomination for Best Supporting Performance in a Series, Miniseries, or Television Film.

At the 19th Screen Actors Guild Awards, the cast was nominated for Best Cast in a Drama Series. Claire Danes and Damian Lewis were also nominated for Best Female Actor and Best Male Actor in a Drama Series respectively. Danes won to claim her second career SAG award.

For the 65th Primetime Emmy Awards, the series received 11 nominations, with two wins. Claire Danes won her second consecutive award for Outstanding Lead Actress in a Drama Series, and Henry Bromell posthumously won for Outstanding Writing for a Drama Series. Nominations included Outstanding Drama Series, Damian Lewis for Outstanding Lead Actor in a Drama Series, Morena Baccarin for Outstanding Supporting Actress in a Drama Series, Mandy Patinkin for Outstanding Supporting Actor in a Drama Series, Rupert Friend for Outstanding Guest Actor in a Drama Series, and Lesli Linka Glatter for Outstanding Directing for a Drama Series for the episode "Q&A". It also received nominations for Outstanding Casting for a Drama Series, Outstanding Sound Mixing for a Comedy or Drama Series (One Hour), and Outstanding Cinematography for a Single-camera Series.

For the 2013 Writers Guild of America Awards, it was nominated for Best Drama Series and Meredith Stiehm received a nomination for Best Episodic Drama for "New Car Smell".

== Home media release ==
Homeland: The Complete Second Season was released as a widescreen region 1 four-disc DVD and three-disc Blu-ray box set in the United States and Canada on September 10, 2013. In addition to the 12 episodes, it includes deleted scenes and four featurettes—"The Border: Prologue to Season 3", "Return to the Homeland: Filming in Israel", "Damian Lewis: A Personal Video Diary", and "The Choice: The Making of the Season Finale". The same set was also released on September 23, 2013 in region 2.

The season was released for streaming on Hulu on August 1, 2016.
