= A Gettysburg Address =

- Homeland episode
- Episode no.: Season 2 Episode 6
- Directed by: Guy Ferland
- Written by: Chip Johannessen
- Production code: 2WAH06
- Original air date: November 4, 2012
- Running time: 49 minutes

Guest appearances
- Hrach Titizian as Danny Galvez; Maury Sterling as Max; Timothée Chalamet as Finn Walden; Marc Menchaca as Lauder Wakefield; Zuleikha Robinson as Roya Hammad; Mido Hamada as M.M.; Seth Gilliam as Chapman; Rupert Friend as Peter Quinn

Episode chronology
← Previous "Q&A"	Next → "The Clearing"
- Homeland season 2

"A Gettysburg Address" is the sixth episode of the second season of the American television drama series Homeland, and the 18th episode overall. It originally aired on Showtime on November 4, 2012.

== Plot ==
Roya Hammad (Zuleikha Robinson), now under surveillance by the CIA, is seen making a rendezvous with an unknown man (Mido Hamada) on a D.C. street. The two talk near a large water fountain, so despite Max (Maury Sterling) being nearby with a microphone, none of their conversation can be heard. After the meeting, Virgil (David Marciano) attempts to follow the man through the subway but eventually loses him. Carrie (Claire Danes) proposes that Brody (Damian Lewis) should be brought in to see if he can identify the mystery man. Brody comes in but does not recognize the man in the photo. Carrie and Quinn (Rupert Friend) press Brody for information. Brody spots the picture of the tailor on the bulletin board, and tells them that the tailor is dead. Carrie and Quinn decide that they can pull their surveillance off the tailor's shop and send in a forensics team to investigate it.

Mike (Diego Klattenhoff) and Lauder (Marc Menchaca) talk to the policeman who found Tom Walker's body, and visit the site where the body was found. Their suspicions turn to Brody, as Lauder concludes that it is unlikely Walker would be in such a place at night unless he was with someone he knew and trusted. Mike reaches out to a contact he has within the CIA. When he goes to Langley to meet up with his contact, he is instead greeted by Saul (Mandy Patinkin) who takes him into a room where Estes (David Harewood) is waiting. Estes and Saul order Mike to cease his "unauthorized freelance investigation" into Walker's death.

At the behest of Carrie, Brody initiates a conversation with Roya in an attempt to learn more about the man Roya was meeting with, and the operation he is involved in. Not much is learned on that front, though Roya does indicate that she already knows about the FBI forensics team that has moved into the tailor's shop, and implies that there may be something important to be found there.

Dana (Morgan Saylor) goes to the local hospital, looking for the woman that Finn (Timothée Chalamet) had struck with his car. To her horror, Dana does find the woman in intensive care and discovers that she is dying. She later relays the information to Finn, and wants to tell somebody about what happened. Finn berates Dana for taking the risk of going to the hospital and angrily states that since he was the driver, he is the one at risk and that absolutely nobody can find out he was responsible.

As Quinn and his team investigate the tailor's shop, four men wearing tactical gear and carrying assault rifles charge into the shop and open fire, shooting everyone inside. Galvez (Hrach Titizian) manages to kill one of them before being wounded. After the firefight, one of the invaders removes his helmet, revealing himself as the same man who met with Roya earlier. They retrieve a large trunk hidden behind a false wall in the shop and leave all of the agents for dead. Quinn is shown to be wounded but still alive.

Under the guise of finding something that Brody borrowed from him, Mike searches Brody's garage and finds his gun, along with an ammunition case which is missing one bullet. Mike later approaches Jessica (Morena Baccarin), telling her that it was Brody who killed Tom Walker and that he is concerned for Jessica and the children's safety. Jessica explains that Brody is working for the CIA. Mike is not satisfied, insisting Brody must be involved in some kind of cover-up. Jessica cuts off the conversation and asks Mike to leave.

Carrie barges into Brody's office. She quickly becomes hysterical as she tells Brody that there were seven casualties, and demands to know whether he had any knowledge of the ambush, or even had a hand in it. Brody denies any knowledge. The episode ends with Carrie crying in Brody's arms.

== Production ==
The episode was written by executive producer Chip Johannessen, and was directed by Guy Ferland.

== Reception ==
=== Ratings ===
The original American broadcast received 1.74 million viewers, which decreased in viewership from the previous episode.

=== Critical response ===
The episode received mostly positive reviews. Critics praised the interactions between Carrie and Brody and the continued forward motion of the plot. The climactic gunfight, however, divided critics; some thought it was a shocking plot development, while others felt it strained credulity and was too similar in tone to 24 (which was also executive produced by Howard Gordon and Alex Gansa).

Scott Collura of IGN rated the episode a 9 out of 10, saying that it excelled in exploring the conflicted motivations and loyalties of the main characters.

Alex Berenson of Esquire praised the episode's subplots and the shootout scene, but felt that the Carrie/Brody/Quinn dynamic in the main storyline fell short.
