= Beirut Is Back =

- Homeland episode
- Episode no.: Season 2 Episode 2
- Directed by: Michael Cuesta
- Written by: Chip Johannessen
- Production code: 2WAH02
- Original air date: October 7, 2012
- Running time: 48 minutes

Guest appearances
- Hrach Titizian as Danny Galvez; Clara Khoury as Fatima Ali; Valerie Cruz as Major Joy Mendez; Zuleikha Robinson as Roya Hammad; Talia Balsam as Cynthia Walden; Tim Guinee as Scott Ryan; Larry Pine as Richard Halsted; Marc Menchaca as Lauder Wakefield; Timothée Chalamet as Finn Walden

Episode chronology
← Previous "The Smile"	Next → "State of Independence"
- Homeland season 2

"Beirut Is Back" is the second episode of the second season of the American television drama series Homeland, and the 14th episode overall. It originally aired on Showtime on October 7, 2012.

== Plot ==
Carrie (Claire Danes) meets her asset, Fatima Ali (Clara Khoury), after Friday prayers at a mosque. Fatima agrees to defect to the United States and provides the time and location of a meeting between her husband, Hezbollah district commander Abbas Ali, and Abu Nazir (Navid Negahban). Carrie and Saul (Mandy Patinkin) relay the information to Estes (David Harewood) from a safehouse. Estes questions the reliability of the tip, and Saul worries it could be an ambush, making it clear neither fully trusts Carrie’s judgment.

The Brodys attend a function with the Waldens. Vice President Walden (Jamey Sheridan) tells Nicholas Brody (Damian Lewis) that one of Iran’s nuclear sites survived recent air strikes and asks him to pressure the Secretary of Defense to support further action. The families grow closer as Cynthia Walden (Talia Balsam) invites Jessica (Morena Baccarin) to co-host a fundraiser, and Dana (Morgan Saylor) meets the Waldens' son Finn (Timothée Chalamet).

Saul later speaks with Estes over the phone phone about capturing Nazir and questions Carrie’s reliability. Carrie overhears the call and suffers a breakdown. On the roof, she admits to Saul that her failure with Brody has shaken her confidence, but insists that the Carrie who recruited Fatima years earlier can be trusted. After reflecting, Saul authorizes the operation.

As the meeting unfolds, Walden brings Brody into a situation room to watch a live feed of the raid. Realizing what is happening, Brody secretly texts “May 1” to Nazir moments before the strike, enabling Nazir to escape while Abbas Ali and another lieutenant are killed by Delta Force.

Saul and Carrie retrieve Fatima to escort her out of the country. Against orders, Carrie searches Fatima’s apartment and gathers documents from her husband’s belongings. As Saul and Fatima are forced to flee by an angry crowd, armed men spot Carrie and chase her through the building. She narrowly escapes, rejoins Saul, and hands over the documents, angering him.

Brody drinks with former Marines Mike (Diego Klattenhoff) and Lauder (Marc Menchaca), who speculate that Tom Walker’s attack must have been part of a larger plot, noting inconsistencies in his actions. Brody dismisses Walker as merely a traitor.

Preparing to ship Abbas Ali’s documents to Langley, Saul discovers a hidden compartment containing a memory card. Viewing it, he is shocked to find Brody’s recorded confession made before his aborted suicide bombing.

== Production ==
The episode was written by executive producer Chip Johannessen, while executive producer Michael Cuesta directed.

== Reception ==
=== Ratings ===
The original American broadcast received 1.66 million viewers, slightly down from the season premiere episode.

=== Critical response ===
Time's James Poniewozik called it "another tense and gripping episode", and praised the interplay between Claire Danes and Mandy Patinkin. Poniewozik described the closing scene as "a genuine, out-of-left-field stunner, and a sign that Homeland is not simply going to conservatively husband its story to keep it spinning out as long as possible."

Scott Collura of IGN rated the episode a 9 out of 10, noting that "Homeland is pushing the plot forward already, even while the characters dig deeper into our psyches."

The Daily Telegraph's Chris Harvey gave the episode 4 out of 5 stars, stating that it brought the series "back to the skin-prickling levels of tension we’ve come to expect from this superior thriller."

== Controversy ==
In October 2012, the Lebanese government promised legal action against the producers of the show for the portrayal of Beirut as a city with dirty narrow streets and a haven for terrorists.
