= New Car Smell (Homeland) =

- Homeland episode
- Episode no.: Season 2 Episode 4
- Directed by: David Semel
- Written by: Meredith Stiehm
- Production code: 2WAH04
- Original air date: October 21, 2012
- Running time: 49 minutes

Guest appearances
- Zuleikha Robinson as Roya Hammad; Timothée Chalamet as Finn Walden; Maury Sterling as Max; Marc Menchaca as Lauder Wakefield; Rupert Friend as Peter Quinn

Episode chronology
← Previous "State of Independence"	Next → "Q&A"
- Homeland season 2

"New Car Smell" is the fourth episode of the second season of the American television drama series Homeland, and the 16th episode overall. It originally aired on Showtime on October 21, 2012.

== Plot ==
Saul (Mandy Patinkin) shows the video of Brody’s (Damian Lewis) confession to Estes (David Harewood). They agree to secretly monitor Brody in hopes of learning what al-Qaeda is planning. The operation is kept within a small circle at the CIA, with analyst Peter Quinn (Rupert Friend) placed in charge at Estes’s insistence. Surveillance cameras are installed at the Rayburn House Office Building, Brody’s phones are tapped, and Virgil (David Marciano) and Max (Maury Sterling) are assigned to tail him outside monitored areas. Carrie clashes with Quinn, surprised that an analyst she has never met is running the operation.

Brody attempts to apologize to Jessica (Morena Baccarin), but she demands an explanation for his behavior. Brody says he wants to tell her but cannot. Jessica gives him an ultimatum to tell her the truth or sleep elsewhere. Brody walks away and checks into the Ashford Hotel, where Quinn’s team taps into the hotel’s security cameras.

Quinn asks Carrie to deliberately cross paths with Brody to make him paranoid and provoke contact with his handler. Carrie encounters Brody outside Langley and implies she is back with the CIA, unsettling him. Brody later meets with Roya Hammad (Zuleikha Robinson) and warns her that Carrie’s return may be connected to him. Roya dismisses his concern, suggesting Carrie is focused on Abu Nazir, and suggests to Brody that he rekindle the relationship.

Lauder (Marc Menchaca) appears at the Brody house, ranting about Brody and refusing to leave. Jessica calls Brody to get him home, but he does not answer. When he finally calls back an hour later, Jessica angrily tells him that Mike (Diego Klattenhoff) has helped instead. Mike drives Lauder home, and the two speculate that Brody is no longer the same man he once was. They wonder whether Brody and Walker had been working together, possibly for the CIA, on the day Walker shot Elizabeth Gaines.

Finn (Timothée Chalamet) takes Dana (Morgan Saylor) inside the Washington Monument while it is closed for renovations, showing her the privileges of being the Vice President’s son. They begin to kiss, but Dana stops, saying she needs to speak with Xander before going further.

At the hotel bar, Brody calls Carrie and invites her for a drink to “bury the hatchet.” Encouraged by Quinn, Carrie joins him, and they have a cordial conversation. Brody admits he is estranged from his wife, and they discuss Carrie’s recovery and her renewed pursuit of Nazir. Afterward, Saul and Quinn praise Carrie’s performance, but she remains uneasy, believing Brody sensed her hostility during the exchange. Quinn disagrees and orders Carrie back to headquarters.

Instead, Carrie goes to Brody’s hotel room and immediately reveals the operation, accusing him of being a traitor and a terrorist and listing his crimes. Saul and Quinn, watching in disbelief, dispatch their team to arrest Brody. As agents arrive, Brody tells Carrie he actually liked her, to which she replies, “I loved you,” leaving him stunned. Brody is arrested, and Carrie becomes overwhelmed with emotion as he is taken away.

== Production ==
The episode was written by executive producer Meredith Stiehm, and was directed by David Semel.

== Reception ==
=== Ratings ===
The original American broadcast received 1.75 million viewers, which increased in viewership and became the highest rated episode up to that point.

=== Critical response ===
The A.V. Club's Emily VanDerWerff gave the episode an "A−" on the strength of the scenes with Carrie and Brody together, saying "I didn’t realize how much I had missed watching Brody and Carrie bounce off of each other," and "something about the chemistry between Claire Danes and Damian Lewis heightens every scene they’re in."

Michael Hogan of The Huffington Post praised Homeland's ability to stay way ahead of viewer expectations and not leave plotlines hanging endlessly. Hogan mentioned the chemistry between Carrie and Brody as well as between Dana and Finn as being noteworthy.

Andy Greenwald of Grantland.com described the plot developments as "thrilling," and also "risky," in that "The central dance between Carrie and Brody, her struggle to bring his dark secret out into the light: This defined Homeland, it was the addictive engine that motored the show from pay-cable obscurity to the Emmy stage. To remove it — or, more likely, to reconsider it — now puts Homeland’s popularity and momentum in jeopardy."

IGN's Scott Collura highly praised the episode, rating it a 9.3 out of 10, citing the interplay between the two leads as a particular high point. Collura enjoyed the new character, Peter Quinn, saying he "brings a refreshing dose of humor to the show."

Entertainment Weekly ranked "New Car Smell" as their second best overall television episode in 2012.
