= In Memoriam (Homeland) =

- Homeland episode
- Episode no.: Season 2 Episode 11
- Directed by: Jeremy Podeswa
- Written by: Chip Johannessen
- Production code: 2WAH11
- Original air date: December 9, 2012
- Running time: 52 minutes

Guest appearances
- Hrach Titizian as Danny Galvez; Zuleikha Robinson as Roya Hammad; Valerie Cruz as Major Joy Mendez; James Urbaniak as Larry; Chance Kelly as Interrogator; Rupert Friend as Peter Quinn

Episode chronology
← Previous "Broken Hearts"	Next → "The Choice"
- Homeland season 2

"In Memoriam" (originally titled "The Motherfucker with the Turban") is the eleventh episode of the second season of the American television drama series Homeland, and the 23rd episode overall. It originally aired on Showtime on December 9, 2012.

== Plot ==
The episode opens with Carrie (Claire Danes) exploring the mill in search of Abu Nazir (Navid Negahban). She sees someone in the building but loses track of him. Continuing to search, she goes through an exit and finds that a slew of CIA and FBI reinforcements have already arrived. Carrie tells Quinn (Rupert Friend) that she spotted Abu Nazir in the building. SWAT teams are sent inside but they do not find anyone. Quinn tells Carrie that Vice President Walden is dead, apparently due to a pacemaker malfunction. Carrie calls Brody (Damian Lewis), who is at the safehouse with Jessica (Morena Baccarin). Jessica overhears enough of the conversation to know who he is talking to; Brody finds her crying when he gets off the phone with Carrie.

Saul (Mandy Patinkin) is taken to an interrogation room. Saul angrily calls the interrogation a "farce" and tells the interrogator (Chance Kelly) that the real reason he is there is that he has uncovered a plan to assassinate a U.S. Congressman. Among other things, Saul is interrogated about the circumstances surrounding Aileen Morgan's death, and whether Saul supplied her with the suicide weapon (his glasses).

Carrie tells Quinn that if Abu Nazir somehow got away with so many personnel surrounding the building, then he must have had help from someone working for them. She asks who was directing the search; Quinn replies that it was himself, along with Galvez (Hrach Titizian). They then learn that Galvez recently left the area. Carrie concludes that Galvez must have smuggled Abu Nazir out of there. They track down Galvez and search his car but find him to be innocent. Galvez explains that he was rushing to the hospital because his stitches had opened up.

Estes (David Harewood) presents Saul with the results of the polygraph session. Saul says that he must have been right about Estes' plan to assassinate Brody. Saul reminds Estes that they made a deal with Brody, but Estes replies that they do not make deals with terrorists. Estes says that he wants Saul out of the agency, either on his own terms, or by Estes using the polygraph results to destroy his career.

Carrie attempts to interrogate Roya Hammad (Zuleikha Robinson). She approaches Roya as someone who has been manipulated by Abu Nazir into doing things that she would not normally do, but this only results in Roya exploding in anger, telling Carrie that "Abu Nazir is not afraid of you" and ranting in Arabic. Afterwards, Carrie is sent home to get some rest, but on the way she recalls Roya literally saying in Arabic that Abu Nazir would not run, leading her to wonder if he has been holed up in the mill the whole time. She returns to the mill and encounters one remaining SWAT team there; she takes the team back inside. Carrie spots an entry to a hidden room where a sleeping bag is found. Carrie goes to retrieve the rest of the SWAT team, but hears a noise and comes back, finding the dead body of the SWAT team member who was accompanying her. Carrie shouts to the rest of the team that Nazir is in the building. Nazir finds Carrie and attacks her but retreats when the SWAT team approaches. They corner Nazir, but are forced to kill him when he reaches for his gun. Afterwards, Carrie is commended by Estes for being the driving force behind the capture of Nazir. Estes then privately tells Quinn that he should proceed with killing Brody and that it should be done as soon as possible.

At the safe house, Brody and his family receive the news that Abu Nazir has been killed and they are free to go home. Brody is overcome with emotion and cries briefly while his family watches in confusion. When they arrive home, Brody stays in the car. When Jessica comes back out to get him, Brody tells her that he cannot go in. They are resigned to the fact that their marriage is over and discuss how it went wrong. Brody starts to tell Jessica about what he was planning on the day Elizabeth Gaines was killed, but Jessica stops him, saying that she does not need to know the truth anymore.

Brody goes to Carrie's house. They embrace in the doorway as Quinn watches from afar.

== Production ==
The episode was written by executive producer Chip Johannessen and directed by Jeremy Podeswa.

== Reception ==
=== Ratings ===
The original American broadcast received 2.36 million viewers, which increased in viewership and is the highest rated episode of the series up to that point.
