= The Smile (Homeland) =

- Homeland episode
- Episode no.: Season 2 Episode 1
- Directed by: Michael Cuesta
- Written by: Howard Gordon; Alex Gansa
- Production code: 2WAH01
- Original air date: September 30, 2012
- Running time: 55 minutes

Guest appearances
- Hrach Titizian as Danny Galvez; Amy Hargreaves as Maggie Mathison; James Rebhorn as Frank Mathison; Zuleikha Robinson as Roya Hammad; Valerie Cruz as Major Joy Mendez; Clara Khoury as Fatima Ali; Timothée Chalamet as Finn Walden

Episode chronology
← Previous "Marine One"	Next → "Beirut Is Back"
- Homeland season 2

"The Smile" is the second-season premiere episode of the American television drama series Homeland, and the 13th episode overall. It originally aired on Showtime on September 30, 2012.

The episode drew a series high rating of 1.73 million viewers, up 60% from its series premiere, and received a total of 2.07 million viewers with repeat viewing that same night.

== Plot ==
Set roughly six months after the events of the Season 1 finale, the episode opens with news of major unrest in the Middle East as Israel has bombed nuclear facilities in Iran, with Iran vowing retaliation. The Central Intelligence Agency is approached by a former asset, Fatima Ali (Clara Khoury), who is a wife of a Hezbollah district commander. She says she has information on an imminent attack on America. However, she refuses to talk to anyone but her former handler, Carrie Mathison (Claire Danes).

Carrie, now working as an ESL teacher, receives a surprise visit from Galvez (Hrach Titizian) while she is teaching a class. Galvez is there on behalf of Estes (David Harewood), who wants to talk with Carrie, but she refuses. The next plea comes from Saul (Mandy Patinkin) on the phone that night. Unable to say no to Saul, she relents and listens to what Estes has to say. Estes explains to Carrie that one of her assets has resurfaced with vital information, and that he is asking Carrie to briefly go to Lebanon to find out what the asset knows. Carrie is still hostile towards Estes and bitter over how she was drummed out of the CIA, but nonetheless agrees to the trip.

Nicholas Brody (Damian Lewis), settling into his new role as a Congressman for Virginia's 2nd congressional district, is approached by Vice President Walden (Jamey Sheridan) who wants to float Brody's name as a potential running mate for his presidential run. Brody happily accepts the offer. Later on, he meets with Roya Hammad (Zuleikha Robinson), a journalist who reveals herself to Brody as an ally of Abu Nazir. She relays an assignment that Nazir has passed along to him. Brody is to retrieve a list of potential attack targets from a safe in Estes' office. Brody correctly ascertains that Al-Qaeda intends to hit one of these targets and refuses at first, reluctant to be responsible for deaths of civilians. Roya says that the world is at war and Brody needs to pick a side. If his allegiance is truly with Al-Qaeda, he will retrieve the list. Brody successfully procures the list the next day while Roya distracts Estes.

During a spirited political and religious debate at her school, Dana (Morgan Saylor) accidentally blurts out that her dad is a Muslim. It gets laughed off as a joke, but word gets back to Jessica (Morena Baccarin), who confronts Dana about it that night. As Dana struggles to explain herself, Brody admits to Jessica that he has converted to Islam. Jessica is shocked and angered by the revelation, feeling she had been lied to by her husband. She also takes issue with Brody embracing the religion of the men that kept him captive and tortured him. In the ensuing argument, Jessica throws Brody's copy of the Quran on the floor. Brody's panicked reaction upsets Jessica even more.

On her way to a rendezvous with Saul in Beirut, Carrie - posing as a Canadian named Kate Morrissey - is followed by a Lebanese intelligence agent who had been surveilling Saul. Speaking via cell phone, Saul advises Carrie to allow herself to be apprehended. Carrie refuses to do so, stating that it would compromise the mission. She attempts to evade her pursuer instead. Leading him into a crowded shop, she knees the man in the groin and successfully escapes into the crowd. Carrie cannot contain a euphoric smile as she flees the scene.

Dana finds her father in the backyard digging a hole. Brody explains that his Quran was desecrated by Jessica, so he is burying it out of respect. Dana helps with the burial.

== Production ==
The episode was co-written by executive producers Alex Gansa and Howard Gordon, while executive producer Michael Cuesta directed.

== Reception ==
=== Ratings ===
The original American broadcast received 1.73 million viewers, which became the highest rated episode up to that point.

=== Critical response ===
TIME's James Poniewozik praised the premiere, saying "what made this such a strong season debut was that the internal drama of the characters was at least as compelling as the thriller stuff". He described all of the fallout from Jessica discovering Brody's conversion to Islam as "fantastic scenes".

HitFix's Alan Sepinwall felt Damian Lewis' performance was particularly strong, and highlighted the confrontation between Brody and Jessica as the best scene of the episode. In regards to Carrie and Brody, he went on to say "these two scarred human beings are the heart of the show, and 'The Smile' was first and foremost about seeing how they're doing after all they went through a season ago. And on that level, it was terrific."

Emily VanDerWerff of The A.V. Club gave the episode a "B+". She felt that Roya Hammad was more of a plot device than a fully formed character, and questioned the plausibility of some of the plot developments, but said that "the rest of the episode is aces in how it deals with the fallout of last season’s finale". VanDerWerff had very high praise for Claire Danes, describing her smile as Carrie escaped as "one of the best moments of acting I’ve ever seen on TV."
