= Q&A (Homeland) =

- Homeland episode
- Episode no.: Season 2 Episode 5
- Directed by: Lesli Linka Glatter
- Written by: Henry Bromell
- Production code: 2WAH05
- Original air date: October 28, 2012
- Running time: 56 minutes

Guest appearances
- Timothée Chalamet as Finn Walden; Hrach Titizian as Danny Galvez; Rupert Friend as Peter Quinn

Episode chronology
← Previous "New Car Smell"	Next → "A Gettysburg Address"
- Homeland season 2

"Q&A" is the fifth episode of the second season of the American television drama series Homeland, and the 17th episode overall. It originally aired on Showtime on October 28, 2012.

The original broadcast was watched by 2.07 million viewers which marked an all-time high for the series. Along with Dexter, it was the first time two Showtime programs topped two million viewers in the same night.

The episode was cited by multiple publications as one of the best television episodes of 2012.

== Plot ==
Brody (Damian Lewis) is taken to a secret location, where he is held alone, handcuffed in a surveillance room. Quinn (Rupert Friend) interrogates him while Saul (Mandy Patinkin) and Carrie (Claire Danes) observe. Quinn pressures Brody into denying that he knew Abu Nazir’s son, wore a suicide vest, or conspired with Tom Walker. Quinn then shows Brody a video of his recorded confession (Note: As seen in "Marine One".) and leaves him alone. Upon returning, Brody admits to knowing and loving Issa and to hating Vice President Walden for ordering the drone strike that killed him, but continues to deny ever wearing a suicide vest. He claims nothing illegal occurred in the bunker and that the CIA lacks evidence. Frustrated, Quinn stabs Brody in the hand with a knife and is dragged out of the interrogation room; he later tells Saul it was an act, explaining that “every good cop needs a bad cop.”

Carrie takes over the interrogation, turning off the cameras (though Saul and Quinn can still hear), removing Brody’s handcuffs, and giving him water. She confronts Brody about how he ruined her career and personal life and asks whether he ever felt guilt or affection for her, which he does not answer. Carrie traps him in a lie about the confession video and asks when he last told the truth. She attempts to disarm him by confessing that she wishes he would leave his family to be with her. Carrie describes how Nazir psychologically broke and rebuilt Brody, and recounts Nazir’s past terrorist attacks that killed civilians she calls “Chrises, Danas, and Jessicas.” She deduces that a phone call from Dana stopped Brody from detonating the vest. Carrie argues that while Nazir and Walden are “monsters” willing to kill innocents, Brody is not, because he ultimately did not carry out the attack.

Pressed about Nazir’s plans, Brody finally admits that an attack on the United States is coming, though he does not know its form. He identifies Roya Hammad as his handler and Bassel as the tailor who built the suicide vest. As Brody recalls his contacts within Al-Qaeda, he realizes that all of them are now dead. Carrie later presents him with a choice: face public exposure, trial, and imprisonment, or secretly cooperate with the CIA to help prevent the attack, with his role remaining hidden.

Elsewhere, Finn (Timothée Chalamet) takes Dana (Morgan Saylor) on a date. Attempting to evade their Secret Service escort, Finn drives recklessly through traffic. While exiting an alley, he accidentally hits a pedestrian, seriously injuring her. Despite Dana’s protests, Finn insists on fleeing the scene, and they drive away after seeing another bystander assist the victim.

Carrie drives Brody home, telling him to use their affair as a cover when reporting his whereabouts to Roya. Jessica (Morena Baccarin) demands honesty from Brody before allowing him back. Brody tells her that he is assisting the CIA on matters of national security.

== Production ==
The episode was written by executive producer Henry Bromell, and was directed by Lesli Linka Glatter. It was Bromell's third writing credit and Glatter's first directing credit for the series. Glatter would go on to serve as executive producer and lead director for the series from the third season onwards.

== Reception ==
=== Ratings ===
The original American broadcast received 2.07 million viewers, which increased in viewership and became the highest rated episode up to that point.

=== Critical reception ===
"Q&A" received critical acclaim, with reviewers particularly praising the central scene involving Carrie's interrogation of Brody. Several critics named it the best episode of Homeland to date. The A.V. Club's Emily VanDerWerff called the interrogation "a masterpiece of both acting and writing" while giving the overall episode an "A" grade. Andy Greenwald of Grantland.com said the scene was "The best thing I've seen on TV so far this year," crediting the acting as well as Bromell's writing and Glatter's camerawork. HitFix's Alan Sepinwall hailed it as a "masterfully-constructed sequence" with "two incredible performances by Lewis and Danes." Sean T. Collins of Rolling Stone said "Q&A" was "one of the show's most intense and exhilarating episodes – arguably the episode the whole series has been building toward," but felt the episode was then brought down by Finn and Dana's accident, criticizing it as being too much of a "soap opera-style twist." TIME's James Poniewozik called the episode "an audacious and exhausting hour of television," and was most impressed by the "remarkable physical performances" by Danes and Lewis.

=== Accolades ===
"Q&A" was nominated for several awards. At the 65th Primetime Emmy Awards, Henry Bromell received a posthumous nomination and win for his teleplay, in the Outstanding Writing in a Drama Series category. Lesli Linka Glatter was nominated for Outstanding Directing for a Drama Series. Claire Danes and Damian Lewis both submitted the episode for consideration on their behalf, in the Outstanding Lead Actress in a Drama Series and Outstanding Lead Actor in a Drama Series categories respectively. Danes won in her category, but Lewis did not. Rupert Friend was nominated for Outstanding Guest Actor in a Drama Series for his performance in the episode. At the 65th Directors Guild of America Awards, Glatter was nominated for Outstanding Directing - Dramatic Series.

At year's end, several publications cited "Q&A" as one of the best television episodes in all of 2012, including TIME, TV Guide, GQ, and IndieWire. In 2024, Rolling Stone ranked it as the 60th-best TV episode of all time.
