= The Clearing (Homeland) =

- Homeland episode
- Episode no.: Season 2 Episode 7
- Directed by: John Dahl
- Written by: Meredith Stiehm
- Production code: 2WAH07
- Original air date: November 11, 2012
- Running time: 52 minutes

Guest appearances
- Talia Balsam as Cynthia Walden; Zuleikha Robinson as Roya Hammad; Timothée Chalamet as Finn Walden; Maury Sterling as Max; Marin Ireland as Aileen Morgan; John Finn as Rex Henning; Victor Slezak as Warden Jack Prithard; Rupert Friend as Peter Quinn

Episode chronology
← Previous "A Gettysburg Address"	Next → "I'll Fly Away"
- Homeland season 2

"The Clearing" is the seventh episode of the second season of the American television drama series Homeland, and the 19th episode overall. It originally aired on Showtime on November 11, 2012.

== Plot ==
Roya Hammad (Zuleikha Robinson) intercepts Brody (Damian Lewis) during his morning jog. She tells him they lost a man in the Gettysburg massacre and his role is now more important than ever. Brody is frustrated over her withholding details from him, partially for the benefit of Carrie (Claire Danes), who is listening in.

Later, the Brody family is en route to a political fundraiser hosted by Rex Henning (John Finn), a wealthy potential contributor to Vice President Walden's (Jamey Sheridan) campaign. On the way, Jessica (Morena Baccarin) informs Brody of Mike's (Diego Klattenhoff) suspicion that he really killed Tom Walker. Brody reluctantly admits to being complicit in the killing, framing it as a CIA mission that went awry. After arriving, Brody complains to Carrie about Mike's continued interference. During the fundraiser, Rex and Brody talk privately, where Rex - who has noticed the untoward interest several guests have about Brody's time in captivity - discloses that he served in Vietnam, and compliments Brody on not 'breaking' while in captivity. Rex later announces his full endorsement of a Walden/Brody presidential ticket. Previously, however, Rex admitted to Brody that he dislikes the self-absorbed Walden, and is really interested in when Brody succeeds Walden as president. Brody protests that he is not the man Rex thinks he is.

Saul (Mandy Patinkin) seeks out captured terrorist Aileen Morgan (Marin Ireland), who is in solitary confinement at a maximum security prison. Saul shows her a photo of the man who met with Roya Hammad and asks Aileen if she can identify him. Aileen describes her miserable day-to-day existence at the facility, and asks to be moved to an above-ground cell with a window in return for the information she has. Saul, after encountering resistance from the warden, is able to fulfill this request with help from the attorney general. Aileen gives Saul a name and possible address of the man in the photo.

During the fundraiser, Dana (Morgan Saylor) and Finn (Timothée Chalamet) argue over when to confess to the hit-and-run that killed a woman a week earlier. The argument is noticed by Cynthia Walden (Talia Balsam) and Jessica, who ask them what is going on. Dana bluntly announces "we killed someone," and proceeds to recount the events of the hit-and-run accident. Cynthia's immediate reaction is to cover up the incident to protect their political standing. The Waldens insist that no report be filed with the police. But, neither Brody nor Jessica is satisfied with this. A guilt-ridden Dana is shocked that Finn is glumly indifferent, knowing his parents will get their way, no matter what.

Quinn (Rupert Friend), having discharged himself from the hospital to return to work, sees Brody as the CIA's most valuable lead and encourages Carrie to somehow empower him. After warning Mike off by playing on his love for Jessica, Carrie meets with Brody in a clearing behind Rex's house. They talk about Brody's feeling false in the face of Rex's honest war heroism. Carrie tries to comfort him, which leads to a prolonged kiss. Brody admits to knowing he is being used and manipulated by Carrie, but continues to kiss her. He admits that she makes him "feel good," which is not at all how it should be. He pulls away and leaves.

Quinn and an FBI team storm the house at the address given to them by Aileen, only to find a man she incidentally knew from living in Saudi Arabia. When he is apprised of the situation, a betrayed-feeling Saul cannot understand why Aileen would dupe them. He then has a realization and rushes to Aileen in the interrogation cell, finding her in a pool of blood after having cut her own throat using a shard from the reading glasses that Saul had given her. He weeps uncontrollably as she dies, later admitting to Quinn that his emotions were what allowed her to play him.

Brody takes Dana to the police station to report the hit-and-run accident, but they find Carrie waiting for them outside the police station. Carrie commands Brody to not file the report, as it will cause him to fall out of favor with Walden, thus jeopardizing his relationship with Abu Nazir. She threatens that his deal with the CIA will be off if he does so. Dana approaches, and Brody apologetically tells her that they cannot report the accident. Dana, believing that her father only cares about the campaign, is disgusted and runs off, while Brody vents his frustration on Carrie: "This is not okay! None of this is fucking OK!"

== Production ==
The episode was written by executive producer Meredith Stiehm, and was directed by John Dahl.

== Reception ==
=== Ratings ===
The original American broadcast received 1.91 million viewers, an increase in viewership from the previous episode.

=== Critical response ===
Alan Sepinwall of HitFix called it a "great, resonant, character-focused episode", praising Mandy Patinkin's performance, and highlighting the Carrie/Brody meet up as a "fantastic scene."

The A.V. Club's Emily VanDerWerff graded it an "A-," crediting Meredith Stiehm's writing and declaring the episode successful in bringing together several disconnected story lines.
