= Lodge Kerrigan =

American screenwriter

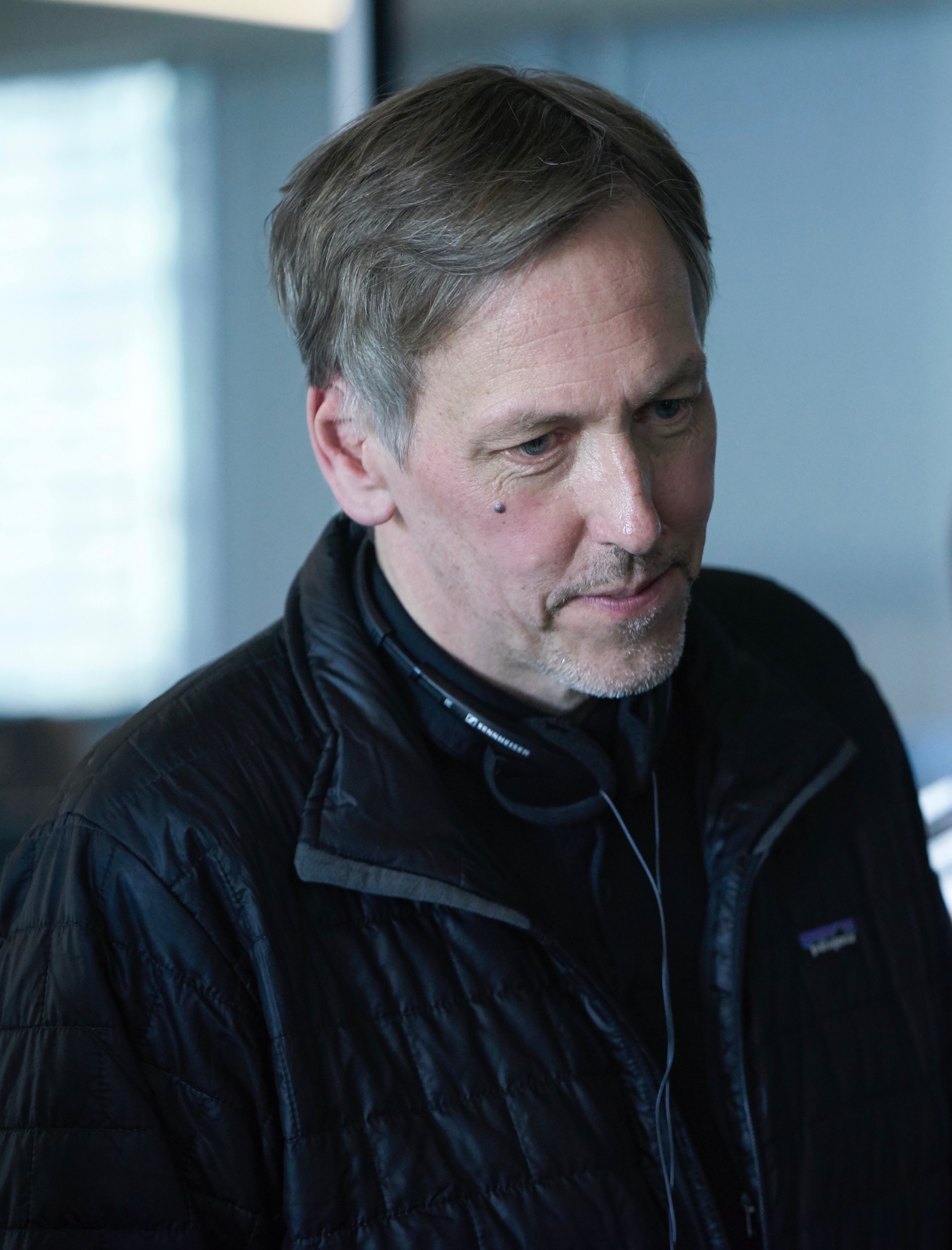
- Born: March 23, 1964 (age 62); New York City, New York, U.S.
- Occupations: Film director Screenwriter
- Years active: 1993–present

Lodge Hunt Kerrigan (born March 23, 1964) is an American motion picture screenwriter and director. His 2010 film Rebecca H. (Return to the Dogs) entered into the Un Certain Regard section of the 2010 Cannes Film Festival.

Along with Amy Seimetz, Kerrigan is the creator/director of Starz' TV adaptation of Steven Soderbergh's The Girlfriend Experience.

Kerrigan earned his B.A. from Columbia University in 1985.

In 2002, Kerrigan shot what would have been his third feature film, a drama about child abduction titled In God's Hands, starring Maggie Gyllenhaal and Peter Sarsgaard. The film completed principal photography, but the entire project ultimately had to be abandoned due to irreparable damage to the negative.

== Filmography ==
=== Film ===
- Clean, Shaven (1994, won Independent Spirit Awards Someone to Watch Award)
- Claire Dolan (1998, nominated for Independent Spirit Award – Best Director)
- Keane (2004)
- Rebecca H. (Return to the Dogs) (2010, never commercially released)

=== Television ===
- Homeland (2012, Episode: "State of Independence")
- Longmire (2013, Episode: "Carcasses")
- The Killing (2013-2014; Episodes: "That You Fear the Most", "Try", "Unraveling")
- The Americans (2014; A Little Night Music)
- Bates Motel (2014; Episode: "Caleb")
- The Red Road (2014; Episode: "The Bad Weapons", "The Great Snake Battle")
- The Girlfriend Experience (2016–present)
