= 65th Primetime Emmy Awards =

2013 television award ceremony

- Promotional poster
- Date: September 22, 2013 (Ceremony); September 15, 2013 (Creative Arts Awards)
- Location: Nokia Theatre, Los Angeles, California
- Presented by: Academy of Television Arts and Sciences
- Hosted by: Neil Patrick Harris

Highlights
- Most awards: Major: Behind the Candelabra (3); All: Behind the Candelabra (11)
- Most nominations: Breaking Bad (8)
- Outstanding Comedy Series: Modern Family
- Outstanding Drama Series: Breaking Bad
- Outstanding Miniseries or Movie: Behind the Candelabra
- Outstanding Reality-Competition Program: The Voice
- Outstanding Variety Series: The Colbert Report
- Website: http://www.emmys.org/

Television/radio coverage
- Network: CBS
- Produced by: Ken Ehrlich
- Directed by: Louis J. Horvitz

The 65th Primetime Emmy Awards, honoring the best in prime time television programming from June 1, 2012, until May 31, 2013, were held on Sunday, September 22, 2013, at the Nokia Theatre in Downtown Los Angeles, California, where 26 awards were presented. CBS televised the ceremony within the United States. Actor Neil Patrick Harris hosted the Primetime Emmys for the second time. The Creative Arts Emmy Awards ceremony was held on September 15.

Breaking Bad won Outstanding Drama Series for the first half of its fifth season, while Modern Family won Outstanding Comedy Series for the fourth consecutive time.

Netflix made history by earning the first Primetime Emmy Award nominations for original online only streaming television. Three of its web series, Arrested Development, Hemlock Grove, and House of Cards, earned a total of 14 nominations. Netflix also made history with three wins, including Outstanding Directing for a Drama Series for the pilot episode, "Chapter 1", of House of Cards, as well as a pair of Creative Arts Emmy Awards, making "Chapter 1" the first Primetime Emmy Award-winning webisode.

== Winners and nominees ==
Winners are listed first and highlighted in bold:

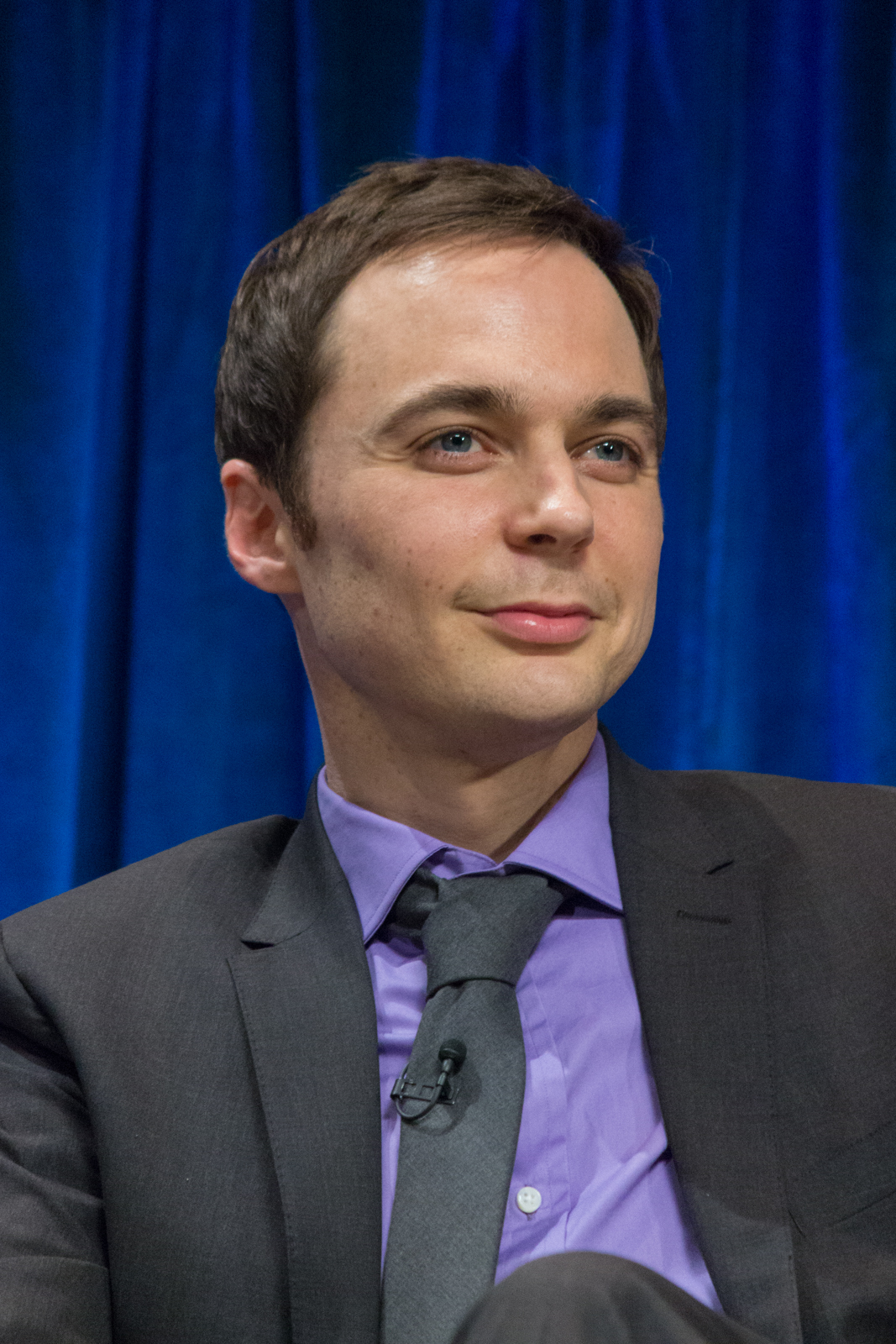
Jim Parsons, Outstanding Lead Actor in a Comedy Series winner

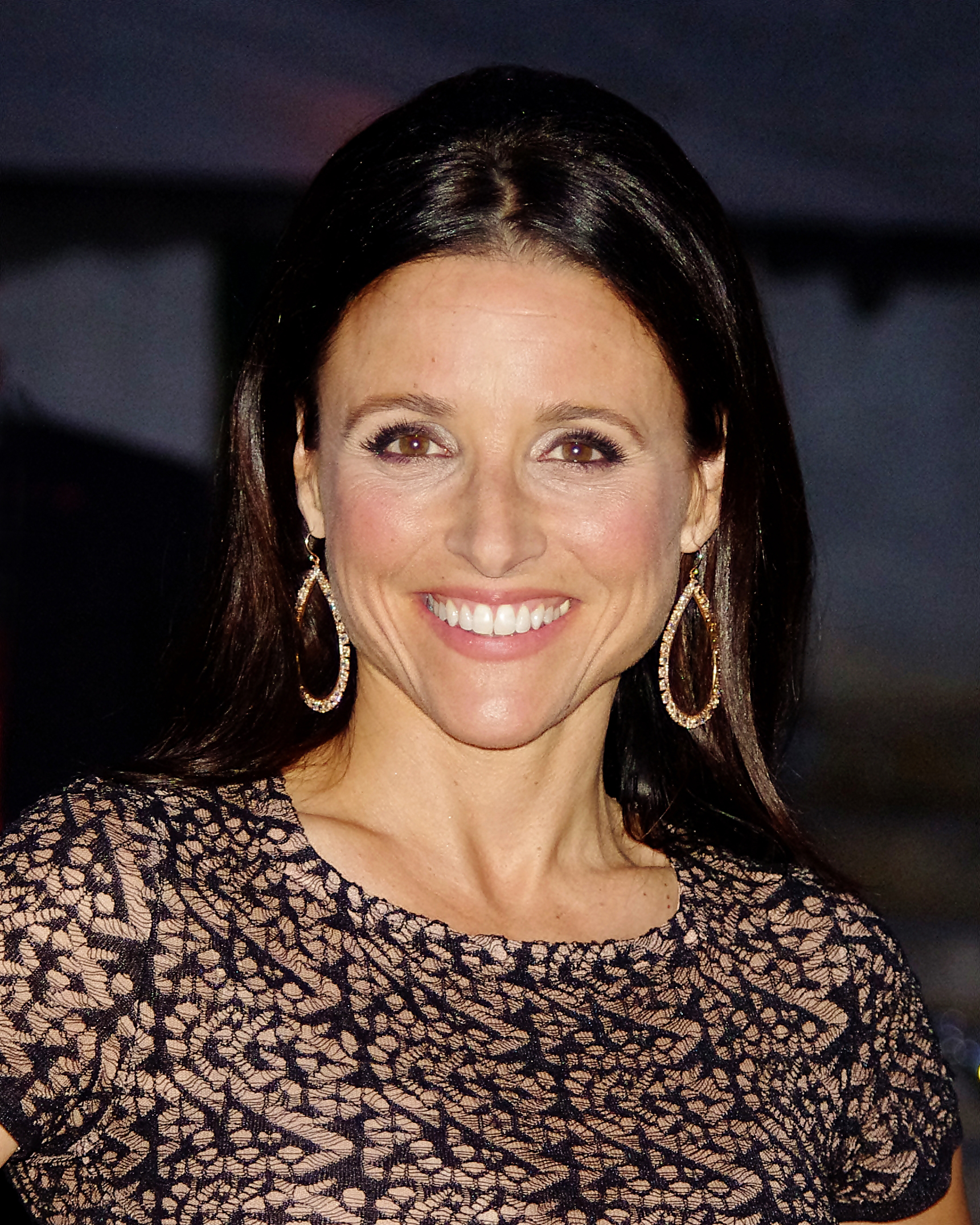
Julia Louis-Dreyfus, Outstanding Lead Actress in a Comedy Series winner

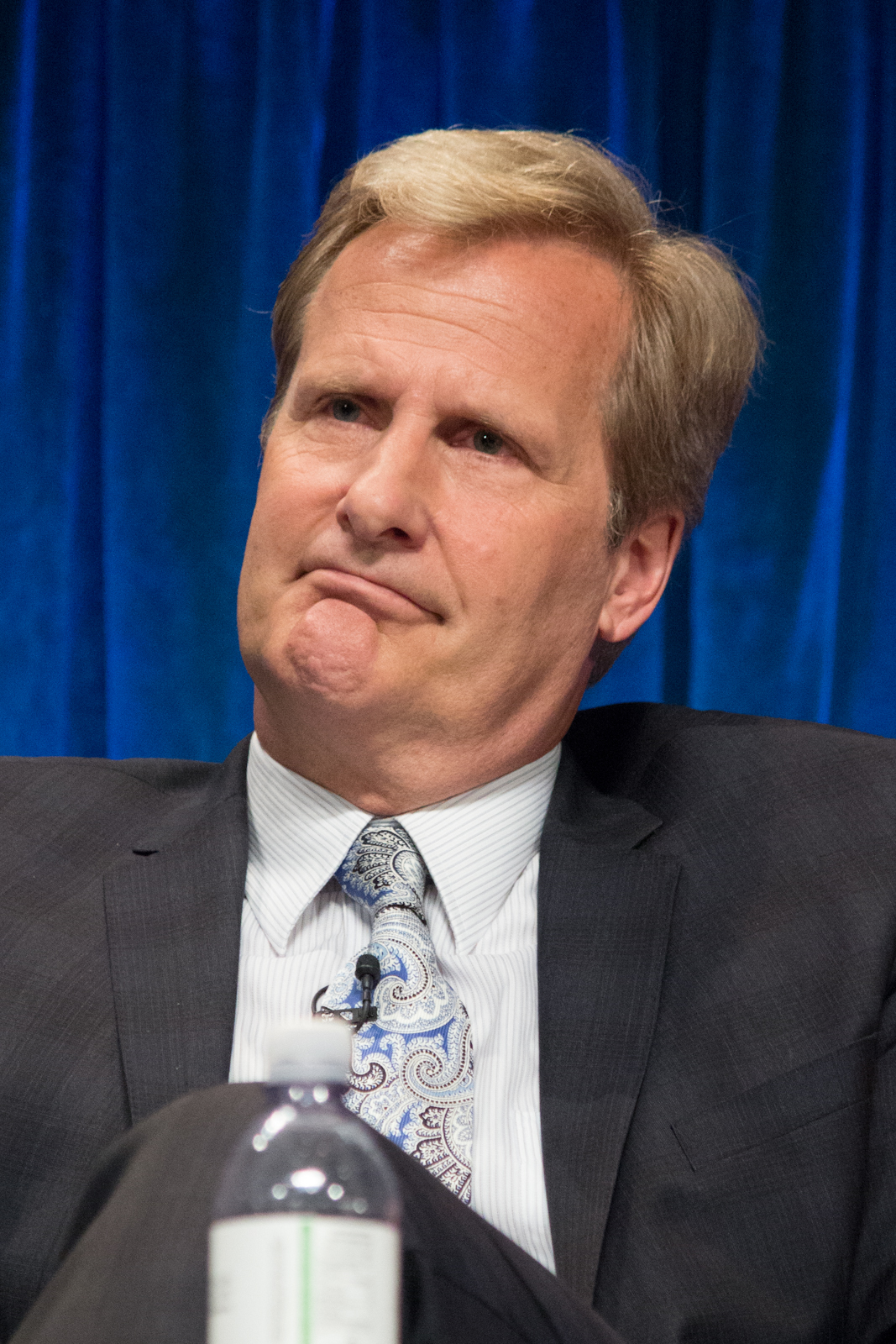
Jeff Daniels, Outstanding Lead Actor in a Drama Series winner

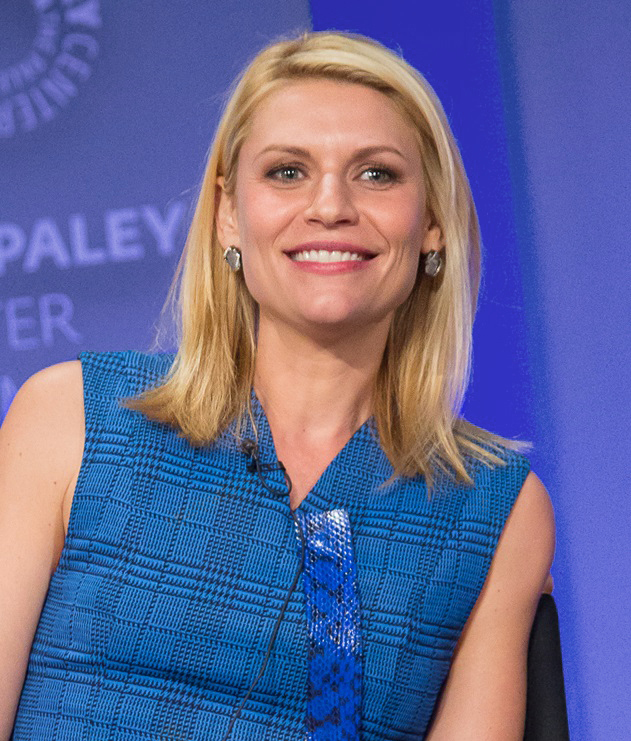
Claire Danes, Outstanding Lead Actress in a Drama Series winner

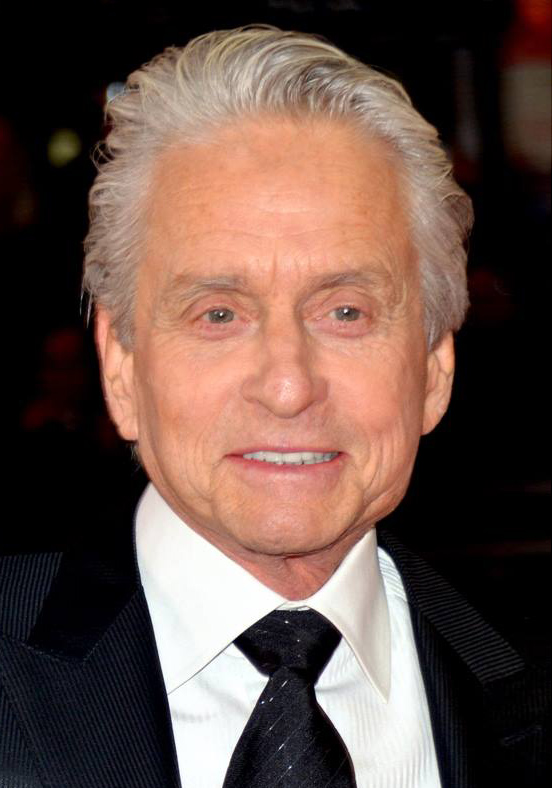
Michael Douglas, Outstanding Lead Actor in a Miniseries or Movie winner

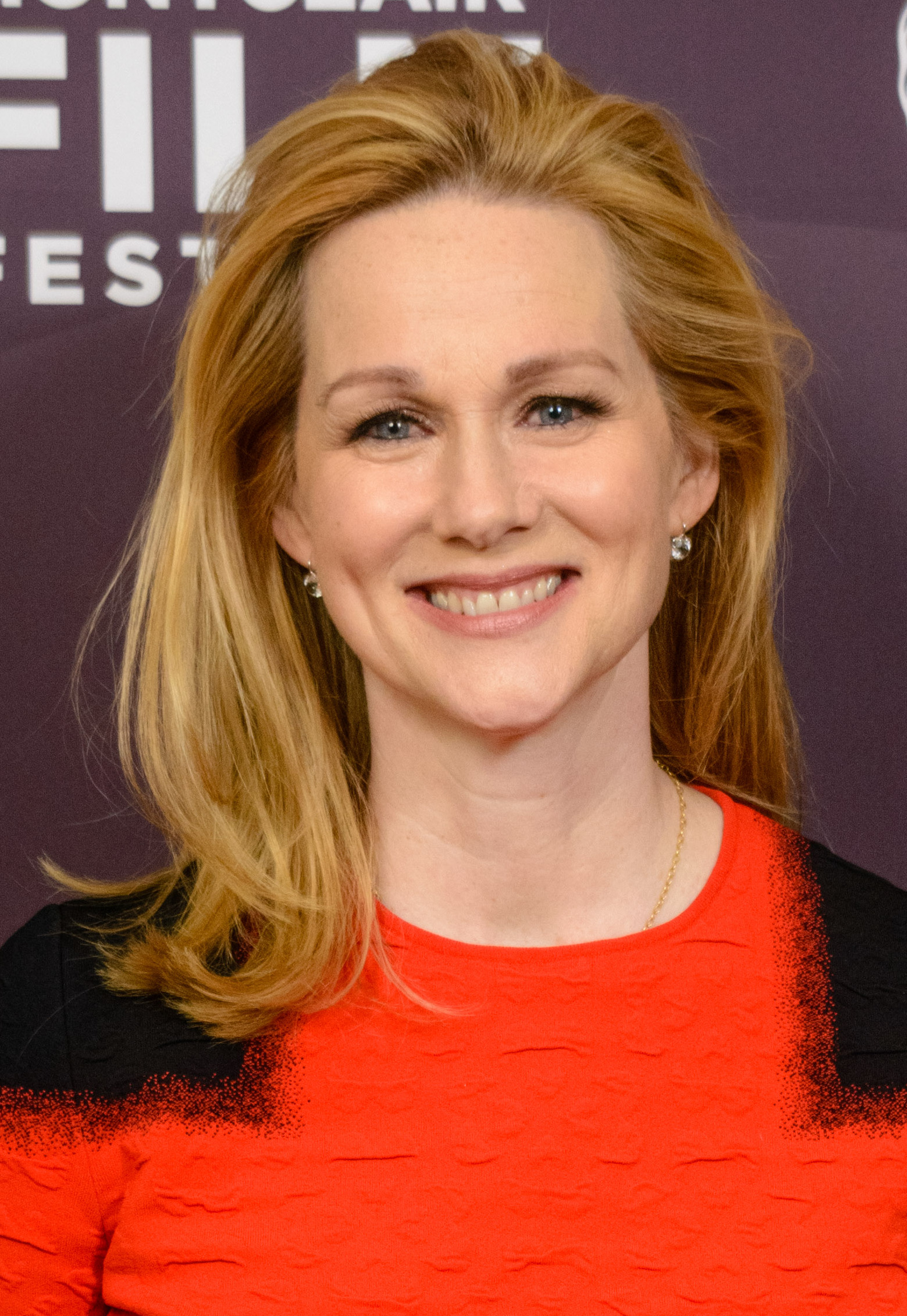
Laura Linney, Outstanding Lead Actress in a Miniseries or Movie winner

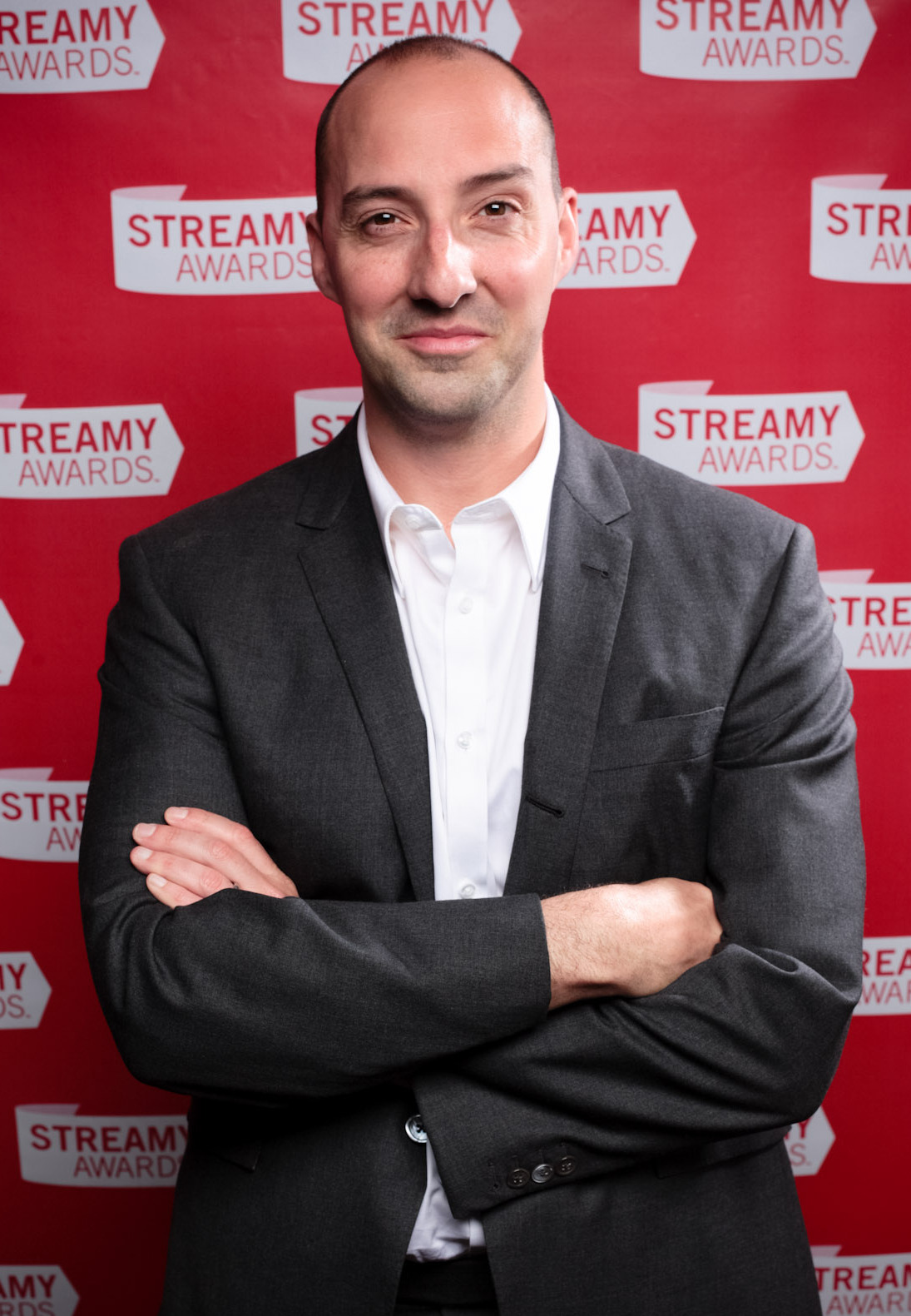
Tony Hale, Outstanding Supporting Actor in a Comedy Series winner

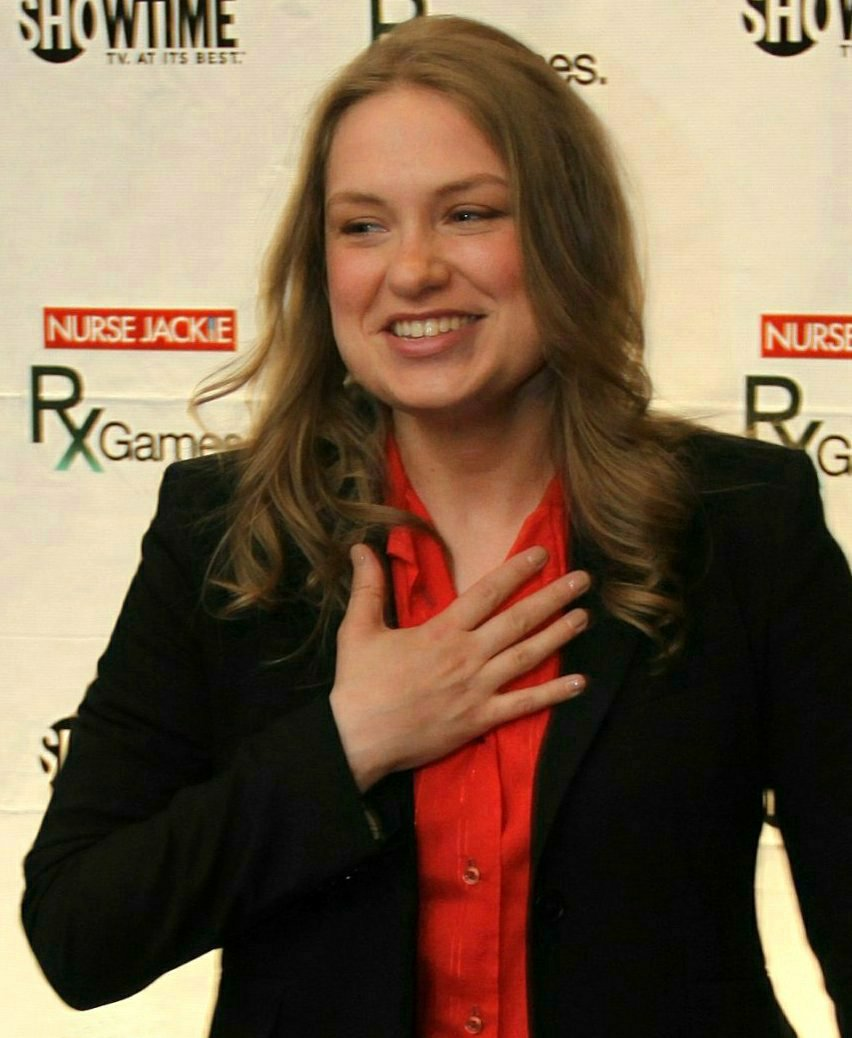
Merritt Wever, Outstanding Supporting Actress in a Comedy Series winner

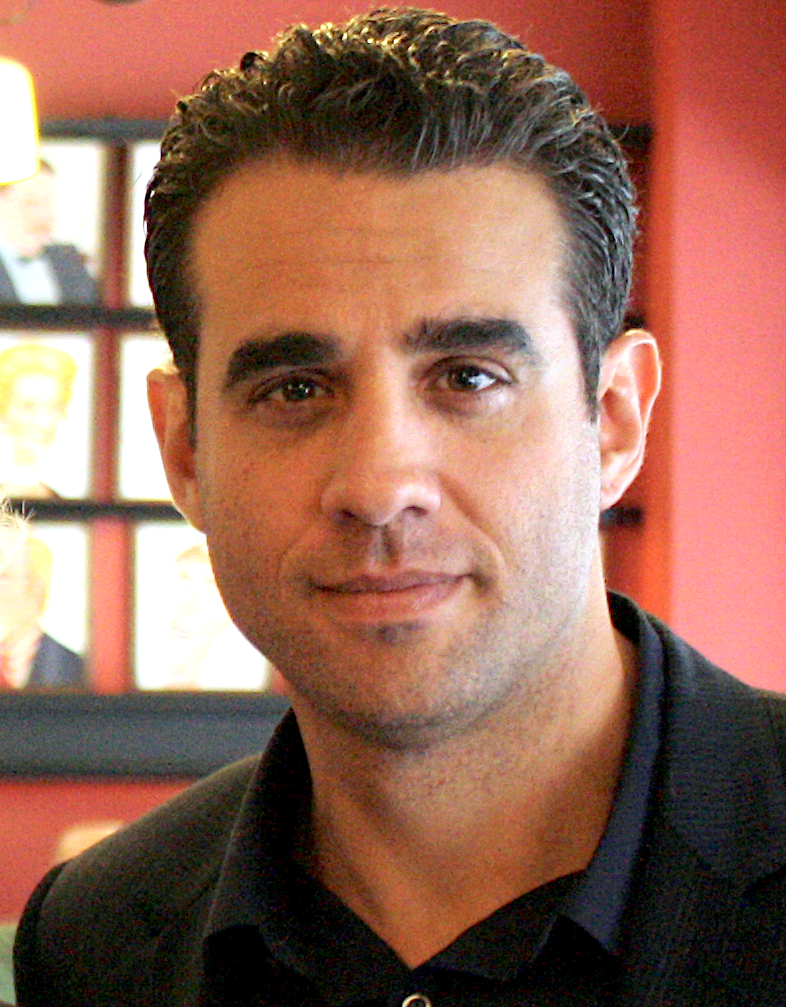
Bobby Cannavale, Outstanding Supporting Actor in a Drama Series winner

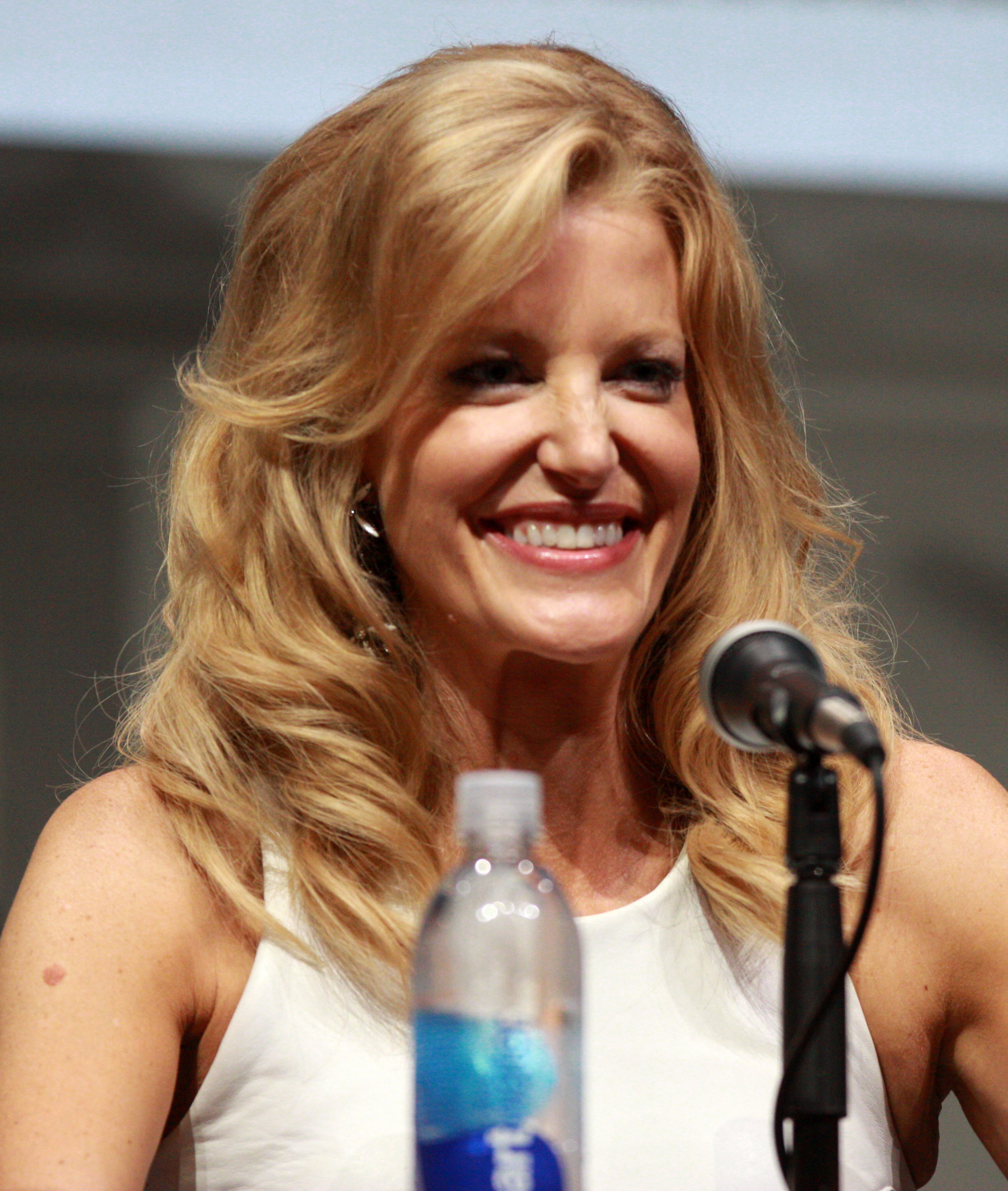
Anna Gunn, Outstanding Supporting Actress in a Drama Series winner

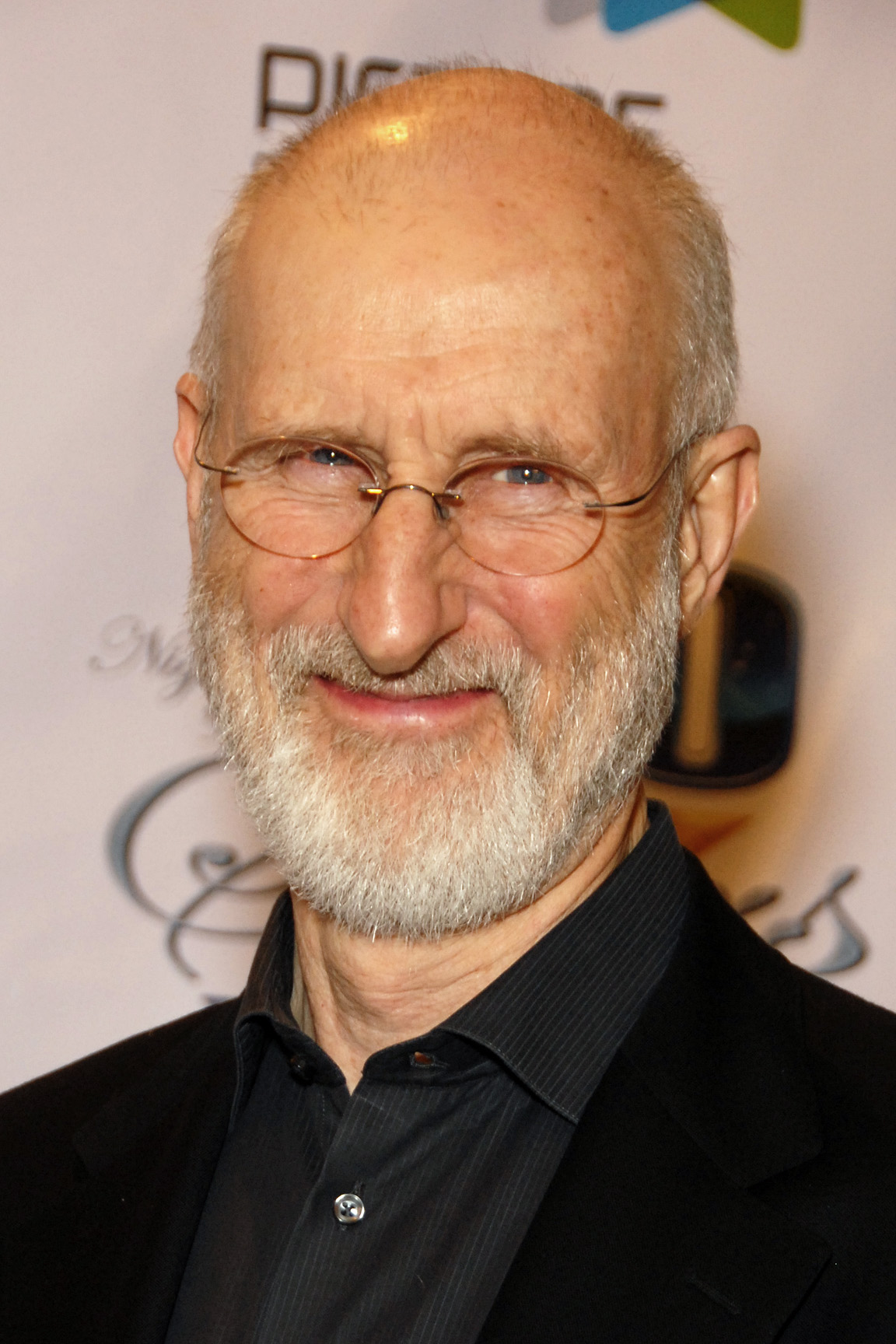
James Cromwell, Outstanding Supporting Actor in a Miniseries or Movie winner

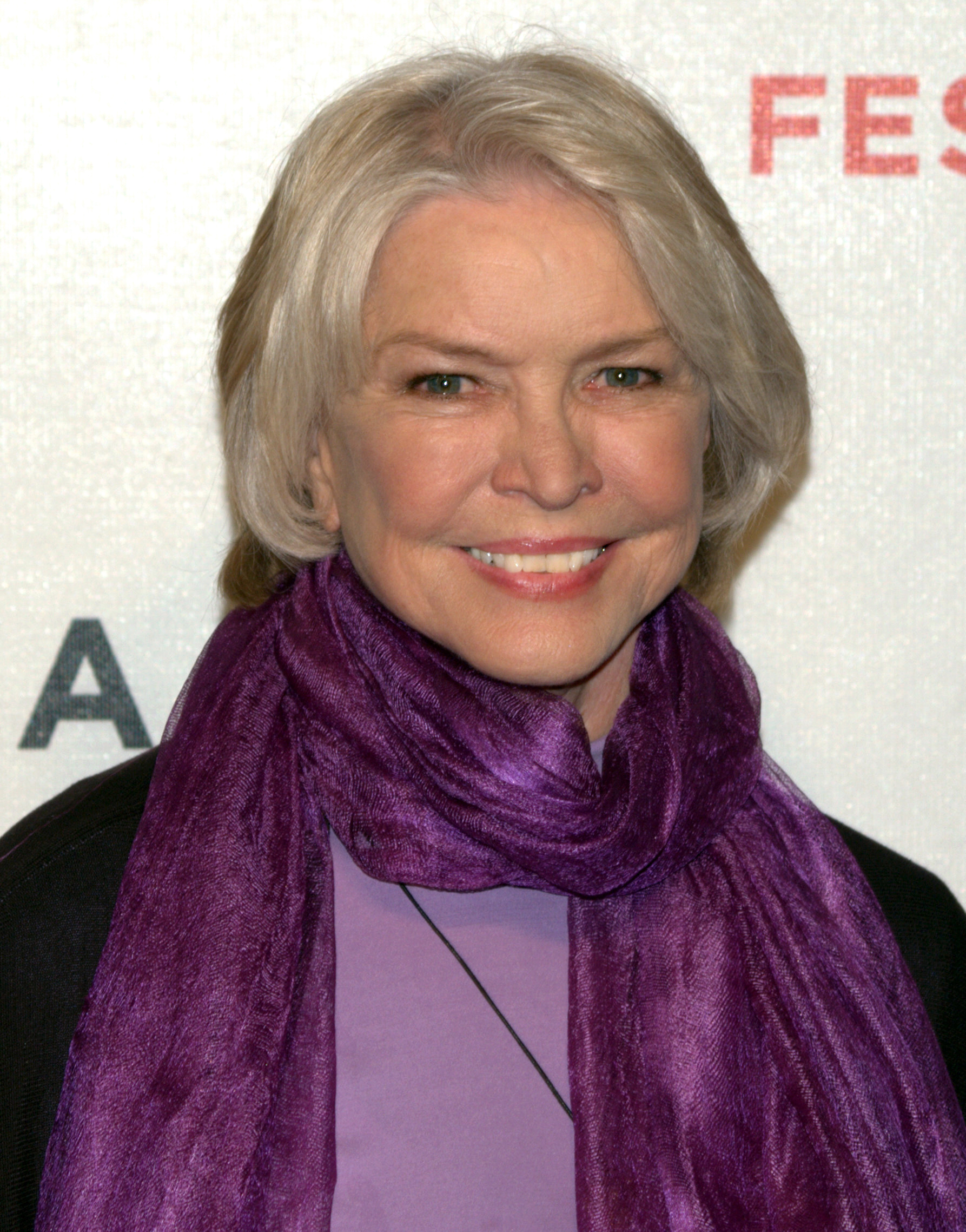
Ellen Burstyn, Outstanding Supporting Actress in a Miniseries or Movie winner

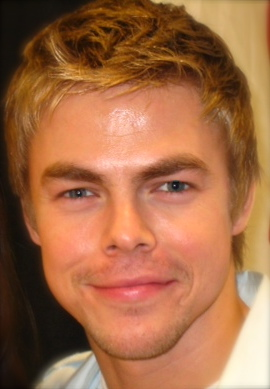
Derek Hough, Outstanding Choreography winner

=== Programs ===
Programs
**Outstanding Comedy Series**: **Modern Family (ABC)**; 30 Rock (NBC); The Big Bang Theory (CBS); Girls (HBO); Louie (FX); Veep (HBO)	**Outstanding Drama Series**: **Breaking Bad (AMC)**; Downton Abbey (PBS); Game of Thrones (HBO); Homeland (Showtime); House of Cards (Netflix); Mad Men (AMC)
**Outstanding Variety Series**: **The Colbert Report (Comedy Central)**; The Daily Show with Jon Stewart (Comedy Central); Jimmy Kimmel Live! (ABC); Late Night with Jimmy Fallon (NBC); Real Time with Bill Maher (HBO); Saturday Night Live (NBC)	**Outstanding Miniseries or Movie**: **Behind the Candelabra (HBO)**; American Horror Story: Asylum (FX); The Bible (History); Phil Spector (HBO); Political Animals (USA); Top of the Lake (Sundance Channel)
**Outstanding Reality-Competition Program**: **The Voice (NBC)**; The Amazing Race (CBS); Dancing with the Stars (ABC); Project Runway (Lifetime); So You Think You Can Dance (Fox); Top Chef (Bravo)

=== Acting ===
==== Lead performances ====
Lead performances
**Outstanding Lead Actor in a Comedy Series**: **Jim Parsons – The Big Bang Theory as Dr. Sheldon Cooper (CBS)**; Alec Baldwin – 30 Rock as Jack Donaghy (NBC); Jason Bateman – Arrested Development as Michael Bluth (Netflix); Louis C.K. – Louie as Louie (FX); Don Cheadle – House of Lies as Marty Kaan (Showtime); Matt LeBlanc – Episodes as himself (Showtime)	**Outstanding Lead Actress in a Comedy Series**: **Julia Louis-Dreyfus – Veep as Vice President Selina Meyer (HBO)**; Laura Dern – Enlightened as Amy Jellicoe (HBO); Lena Dunham – Girls as Hannah Horvath (HBO); Edie Falco – Nurse Jackie as Jackie Peyton, RN (Showtime); Tina Fey – 30 Rock as Liz Lemon (NBC); Amy Poehler – Parks and Recreation as Leslie Knope (NBC)
**Outstanding Lead Actor in a Drama Series**: **Jeff Daniels – The Newsroom as Will McAvoy (HBO)**; Hugh Bonneville – Downton Abbey as Robert, Earl of Grantham (PBS); Bryan Cranston – Breaking Bad as Walter White (AMC); Jon Hamm – Mad Men as Don Draper (AMC); Damian Lewis – Homeland as Nicholas Brody (Showtime); Kevin Spacey – House of Cards as Frank Underwood (Netflix)	**Outstanding Lead Actress in a Drama Series**: **Claire Danes – Homeland as Carrie Mathison (Showtime)**; Connie Britton – Nashville as Rayna Jaymes (ABC); Michelle Dockery – Downton Abbey as Lady Mary Crawley (PBS); Vera Farmiga – Bates Motel as Norma Louise Bates (A&E); Elisabeth Moss – Mad Men as Peggy Olson (AMC); Kerry Washington – Scandal as Olivia Pope (ABC); Robin Wright – House of Cards as Claire Underwood (Netflix)
**Outstanding Lead Actor in a Miniseries or Movie**: **Michael Douglas – Behind the Candelabra as Liberace (HBO)**; Benedict Cumberbatch – Parade's End as Christopher Tietjens (HBO); Matt Damon – Behind the Candelabra as Scott Thorson (HBO); Toby Jones – The Girl as Alfred Hitchcock (HBO); Al Pacino – Phil Spector as Phil Spector (HBO)	**Outstanding Lead Actress in a Miniseries or Movie**: **Laura Linney – The Big C: Hereafter as Cathy Jamison (Showtime)**; Jessica Lange – American Horror Story: Asylum as Sister Jude Martin / Judy Martin (FX); Helen Mirren – Phil Spector as Linda Kenney Baden (HBO); Elisabeth Moss – Top of the Lake as Robin Griffin (Sundance Channel); Sigourney Weaver – Political Animals as Elaine Barrish (USA)

==== Supporting performances ====
Supporting performances
**Outstanding Supporting Actor in a Comedy Series**: **Tony Hale – Veep as Gary Walsh (HBO)**; Ty Burrell – Modern Family as Phil Dunphy (ABC); Adam Driver – Girls as Adam Sackler (HBO); Jesse Tyler Ferguson – Modern Family as Mitchell Pritchett (ABC); Bill Hader – Saturday Night Live as various characters (NBC); Ed O'Neill – Modern Family as Jay Pritchett (ABC)	**Outstanding Supporting Actress in a Comedy Series**: **Merritt Wever – Nurse Jackie as Zoey Barkow, RN (Showtime)**; Mayim Bialik – The Big Bang Theory as Dr. Amy Farrah Fowler (CBS); Julie Bowen – Modern Family as Claire Dunphy (ABC); Anna Chlumsky – Veep as Amy Brookheimer (HBO); Jane Krakowski – 30 Rock as Jenna Maroney (NBC); Jane Lynch – Glee as Sue Sylvester (Fox); Sofía Vergara – Modern Family as Gloria Delgado-Pritchett (ABC)
**Outstanding Supporting Actor in a Drama Series**: **Bobby Cannavale – Boardwalk Empire as Gyp Rosetti (HBO)**; Jonathan Banks – Breaking Bad as Mike Ehrmantraut (AMC); Jim Carter – Downton Abbey as Charles Carson (PBS); Peter Dinklage – Game of Thrones as Tyrion Lannister (HBO); Mandy Patinkin – Homeland as Saul Berenson (Showtime); Aaron Paul – Breaking Bad as Jesse Pinkman (AMC)	**Outstanding Supporting Actress in a Drama Series**: **Anna Gunn – Breaking Bad as Skyler White (AMC)**; Morena Baccarin – Homeland as Jessica Brody (Showtime); Christine Baranski – The Good Wife as Diane Lockhart (CBS); Emilia Clarke – Game of Thrones as Daenerys Targaryen (HBO); Christina Hendricks – Mad Men as Joan Harris (AMC); Maggie Smith – Downton Abbey as Dowager Countess, Violet Crawley (PBS)
**Outstanding Supporting Actor in a Miniseries or Movie**: **James Cromwell – American Horror Story: Asylum as Dr. Arthur Arden / Hans Grüper (FX)**; Scott Bakula – Behind the Candelabra as Bob Black (HBO); John Benjamin Hickey – The Big C: Hereafter as Sean Tolke (Showtime); Peter Mullan – Top of the Lake as Matt Mitcham (Sundance Channel); Zachary Quinto – American Horror Story: Asylum as Dr. Oliver Thredson (FX)	**Outstanding Supporting Actress in a Miniseries or Movie**: **Ellen Burstyn – Political Animals as Margaret Barrish (USA)**; Sarah Paulson – American Horror Story: Asylum as Lana Winters (FX); Charlotte Rampling – Restless as Sally Gilmartin / Eva Delectorskaya (older) (Sundance Channel); Imelda Staunton – The Girl as Alma Hitchcock (HBO); Alfre Woodard – Steel Magnolias as Louisa "Ouiser" Boudreaux (Lifetime)

=== Choreography ===
Choreography
**Outstanding Choreography**
- **Dancing with the Stars: "Hey Pachuco" / "Para Los Rumberos" / "Walking on Air" – Derek Hough (ABC)**
  - Dancing with the Stars: "Heart Cry" / "Stars" – Allison Holker and Derek Hough (ABC)
  - Rodgers & Hammerstein's Carousel (Live from Lincoln Center) – Warren Carlyle (PBS)
  - So You Think You Can Dance: "Call of the Wild (Circle of Life)" / "Love Cats" / "Beautiful People" – Tabitha and Napoleon D'umo (Fox)
  - So You Think You Can Dance: "Possibly Maybe" / "Turning Page" / "Sail" – Sonya Tayeh (Fox)
  - So You Think You Can Dance: "The Power of Love" / "Wild Horses" – Mandy Moore (Fox)
  - So You Think You Can Dance: "Where the Light Gets In" / "Without You" / "Unchained Melody" – Travis Wall (Fox)

=== Directing ===
Directing
**Outstanding Directing for a Comedy Series**: **Modern Family: "Arrested" – Gail Mancuso (ABC)**; 30 Rock: "Hogcock!" / "Last Lunch" – Beth McCarthy-Miller (NBC); Glee: "Diva" – Paris Barclay (Fox); Girls: "On All Fours" – Lena Dunham (HBO); Louie: "New Year's Eve" – Louis C.K. (FX)	**Outstanding Directing for a Drama Series**: **House of Cards: "Chapter 1" – David Fincher (Netflix)**; Boardwalk Empire: "Margate Sands" – Tim Van Patten (HBO); Breaking Bad: "Gliding Over All" – Michelle MacLaren (AMC); Downton Abbey: "Episode Four" – Jeremy Webb (PBS); Homeland: "Q&A" – Lesli Linka Glatter (Showtime)
**Outstanding Directing for a Variety Series**: **Saturday Night Live: "Host: Justin Timberlake" – Don Roy King (NBC)**; The Colbert Report: "Episode 8131" – Jim Hoskinson (Comedy Central); The Daily Show with Jon Stewart: "Episode 17153" – Chuck O'Neil (Comedy Central); Jimmy Kimmel Live!: "Episode 13-1810" – Andy Fisher (ABC); Late Show with David Letterman: "Episode 3749" – Jerry Foley (CBS); Portlandia: "Alexandra" – Jonathan Krisel (IFC)	**Outstanding Directing for a Miniseries, Movie or Dramatic Special**: **Behind the Candelabra – Steven Soderbergh (HBO)**; The Girl – Julian Jarrold (HBO); Phil Spector – David Mamet (HBO); Ring of Fire – Allison Anders (Lifetime); Top of the Lake: "Part 5" – Jane Campion and Garth Davis (Sundance Channel)

=== Writing ===
Writing
**Outstanding Writing for a Comedy Series**: **30 Rock: "Last Lunch" – Tina Fey and Tracey Wigfield (NBC)**; 30 Rock: "Hogcock!" – Jack Burditt and Robert Carlock (NBC); Episodes: "Episode Nine" – David Crane and Jeffrey Klarik (Showtime); Louie: "Daddy's Girlfriend, Part 1" – Pamela Adlon and Louis C.K. (FX); The Office: "Finale" – Greg Daniels (NBC)	**Outstanding Writing for a Drama Series**: **Homeland: "Q&A" – Henry Bromell (Showtime)**; Breaking Bad: "Dead Freight" – George Mastras (AMC); Breaking Bad: "Say My Name" – Thomas Schnauz (AMC); Downton Abbey: "Episode Four" – Julian Fellowes (PBS); Game of Thrones: "The Rains of Castamere" – David Benioff and D. B. Weiss (HBO)
**Outstanding Writing for a Variety Series**: **The Colbert Report (Comedy Central)**; The Daily Show with Jon Stewart (Comedy Central); Jimmy Kimmel Live! (ABC); Portlandia (IFC); Real Time with Bill Maher (HBO); Saturday Night Live (NBC)	**Outstanding Writing for a Miniseries, Movie or Dramatic Special**: **The Hour – Abi Morgan (BBC America)**; Behind the Candelabra – Richard LaGravenese (HBO); Parade's End – Tom Stoppard (HBO); Phil Spector – David Mamet (HBO); Top of the Lake – Jane Campion and Gerard Lee (Sundance Channel)

=== Academy's "hanging episodes" rule ===
The Television Academy was alerted to an issue with "hanging episodes" by Starz. The channel has numerous series with multiple "hanging episodes". "Hanging episodes" are episodes broadcast after the Academy's deadline for consideration that are part of a season that began before the deadline. For instance, in 2012, Starz's Magic City and AMC's Mad Men both ended their seasons in June, after the May 31 deadline. These episodes were allowed to be webcast for award consideration prior to their telecast should that telecast air after the submission period has closed. The Academy had prior rules stipulating that eligible episodes be presented on the same platform as the episodes that qualify the series.

== Most major nominations ==
Networks with multiple major nominations (Note: "Major" constitutes the categories listed above: Program, Acting, Directing, and Writing. Does not include the technical categories.)
Network	No. of Nominations
HBO	34
ABC	15
NBC	15
Showtime	14
AMC	12
FX	9
PBS	8
Fox	7
CBS	6
Netflix	5
Sundance Channel	5
USA	3

Programs with multiple major nominations
Program	Category	Network	No. of Nominations
Breaking Bad	Drama	AMC	8
30 Rock	Comedy	NBC	7
Downton Abbey	Drama	PBS	7
Homeland	Drama	Showtime	7
Modern Family	Comedy	ABC	7
Behind the Candelabra	Miniseries or Movie	HBO	6
American Horror Story: Asylum	Miniseries or Movie	FX	5
Phil Spector	Miniseries or Movie	HBO	5
So You Think You Can Dance	Reality-Competition	Fox	5
Top of the Lake	Miniseries or Movie	Sundance Channel	5
Game of Thrones	Drama	HBO	4
Girls	Comedy	HBO	4
House of Cards	Drama	Netflix	4
Louie	Comedy	FX	4
Mad Men	Drama	AMC	4
Saturday Night Live	Variety	NBC	4
Veep	Comedy	HBO	4
The Big Bang Theory	Comedy	CBS	3
The Colbert Report	Variety	Comedy Central	3
The Daily Show with Jon Stewart	Variety	Comedy Central	3
Dancing with the Stars	Reality-Competition	ABC	3
The Girl	Miniseries or Movie	HBO	3
Jimmy Kimmel Live!	Variety	ABC	3
Political Animals	Miniseries or Movie	USA	3
The Big C: Hereafter	Miniseries or Movie	Showtime	2
Boardwalk Empire	Drama	HBO	2
Episodes	Comedy	Showtime	2
Glee	Comedy	Fox	2
Nurse Jackie	Comedy	Showtime	2
Parade's End	Miniseries or Movie	HBO	2
Portlandia	Variety	IFC	2
Real Time with Bill Maher	Variety	HBO	2

== Most major awards ==
Networks with multiple major awards
Network	No. of Awards
HBO	7
Showtime	4
ABC	3
NBC	3
AMC	2
Comedy Central	2

Programs with multiple major awards
Program	Category	Network	No. of Awards
Behind the Candelabra	Miniseries or Movie	HBO	3
Breaking Bad	Drama	AMC	2
The Colbert Report	Variety	Comedy Central	2
Homeland	Drama	Showtime	2
Modern Family	Comedy	ABC	2
Veep	Comedy	HBO	2

== Presenters and performers ==
The awards were presented by the following:

=== Presenters ===
Name(s)	Role
Tina Fey; Amy Poehler	Presenters of the award for Outstanding Supporting Actress in a Comedy Series
Malin Åkerman; LL Cool J	Presenters of the award for Outstanding Writing for a Comedy Series
Emily Deschanel; Zooey Deschanel	Presenters of the award for Outstanding Supporting Actor in a Comedy Series
Robin Williams	Presenter of a tribute to Jonathan Winters
Alec Baldwin; Jon Hamm	Presenters of the award for Outstanding Lead Actress in a Comedy Series
Will Arnett; Margo Martindale	Introducers of Outstanding Guest Actress in a Comedy Series winner Melissa Leo
Melissa Leo	Presenter of the award for Outstanding Directing for a Comedy Series
Jimmy Kimmel; Sofía Vergara	Presenters of the award for Outstanding Lead Actor in a Comedy Series
Rob Reiner	Presenter of a tribute to Jean Stapleton
Matt Damon; Michael Douglas	Introducers of the performance by Elton John tributing Liberace and presenters of the award for Outstanding Lead Actress in a Miniseries or Movie
Connie Britton; Blair Underwood	Presenters of the awards for Outstanding Writing for a Drama Series and Outstanding Supporting Actress in a Drama Series
Jane Lynch	Presenter of a tribute to Cory Monteith
Stephen Amell; Mindy Kaling	Presenters of the award for Outstanding Reality-Competition Program
Diahann Carroll; Kerry Washington	Presenters of the award for Outstanding Supporting Actor in a Drama Series
Julianna Margulies; Dylan McDermott	Presenters of the award for Outstanding Lead Actor in a Drama Series
Don Cheadle	Introducer of The Beatles on The Ed Sullivan Show 50th anniversary tribute and the performance of "Yesterday" by Carrie Underwood
Jimmy Fallon	Presenter of the award for Outstanding Lead Actress in a Drama Series
Emilia Clarke; Dean Norris	Introducers of Outstanding Guest Actor in a Drama Series winner Dan Bucatinsky and Outstanding Guest Actress in a Drama Series winner Carrie Preston
Dan Bucatinsky; Carrie Preston	Presenters of the award for Outstanding Directing for a Drama Series
Bob Newhart; Jim Parsons	Presenters of the award for Outstanding Writing for a Variety Series and Outstanding Directing for a Variety Series
Michael J. Fox	Presenter of a tribute to Gary David Goldberg
Tim Gunn; Heidi Klum	Presenters of the award for Outstanding Choreography
Alyson Hannigan; Cobie Smulders	Presenters of the award for Outstanding Variety Series
Edie Falco	Presenter of a tribute to James Gandolfini
Anna Faris; Allison Janney	Presenters of the awards for Outstanding Writing for a Miniseries, Movie or Dramatic Special and Outstanding Supporting Actor in a Miniseries or Movie
Kaley Cuoco; Bruce Rosenblum	Presenters of the In Memoriam tribute
Andre Braugher; Mark Harmon	Presenters of the awards for Outstanding Directing for a Miniseries, Movie or Dramatic Special and Outstanding Supporting Actress in a Miniseries or Movie
Bryan Cranston; Claire Danes	Presenters of the award for Outstanding Lead Actor in a Miniseries or Movie and Outstanding Miniseries or Movie
Will Ferrell	Presenter of the awards for Outstanding Comedy Series and Outstanding Drama Series

=== Performers ===
Name(s)	Performed
Elton John	"Home Again"
Neil Patrick Harris; Nathan Fillion; Sarah Silverman	"The Number in the Middle of the Show"
Carrie Underwood	"Yesterday"
Neil Patrick Harris; Outstanding Choreography nominees	"Luck Be a Lady" "A Beautiful Mine" (Mad Men theme); Game of Thrones theme American Horror Story theme "Straight Up and Down" (Boardwalk Empire theme) "Get Lucky"; Breaking Bad theme The Big Bang Theory theme

== In Memoriam ==
Prior to the In Memoriam segment:

- Robin Williams presented a tribute to Jonathan Winters
- Rob Reiner presented a tribute to Jean Stapleton
- Jane Lynch presented a tribute to Cory Monteith
- Michael J. Fox presented a tribute to Gary David Goldberg
- Edie Falco presented a tribute to James Gandolfini

A video was then presented paying tribute to the TV stars and well-known behind-the-scenes workers who had died since the previous Primetime Emmy Awards broadcast, including:

- David Frost
- Dennis Farina
- Annette Funicello
- Eydie Gormé
- Dale Robertson
- Larry Hagman
- Leslie Frankenheimer
- Conrad Bain
- Maxine Stuart
- Lee Thompson Young
- Preston Davis
- Alan Kirschenbaum
- James Loper
- Lou Myers
- Milo O'Shea
- Fran Bascom
- Lois Smith
- Roger Ebert
- Emily Squires
- Bonnie Dore
- Eileen Brennan
- Bonnie Franklin
- Russell Means
- Milt Hoffman
- Jack Shea
- Jeanne Cooper
- Allan Arbus
- Henry Bromell
- David Connell
- Charles Durning
- Richard Matheson
- Harry Carey Jr.
- Ken Venturi
- Pat Summerall
- Steve Sabol
- Alex Karras
- Jack Klugman
- Jenni Rivera
- Eddie Michaels
- Michael Ansara
- Charles Lisanby
- Fay Kanin
- Emanuel Steward
- Ray Dolby
- Julie Harris
- Deborah Raffin
- Patti Page
- Andy Williams

== Reception ==
=== Critical ===
The reviews for the ceremony were mostly negative. Brian Lowry of Variety panned the show, writing: "By the time the show was over, it was hard not to think we could have done with at least one less musical number, or one less memorial tribute, in order to let the winners — including high-profile ones in major categories — actually deliver an acceptance speech without hearing piano music kick in just as they started warming up." Melisa Maerz of Entertainment Weekly also gave the ceremony a negative review, writing: "All of which begged the question: What does the Emmys really offer us, anyway, that we can't get elsewhere? Witty banter? (There was more of that online.) Red-carpet gawking? (Nothing here that you can't see on Instagram.) Exclusive access to the Mani Cam? If you're only tuning in to see which under-appreciated shows to add to your DVR queue, well, Twitter can tell you that better than the Emmys, especially when a mediocre season of Modern Family wins against Louie, Girls, and Veep. The one thing the Emmys is still very good at? Creating consensus. But maybe that's the problem. This year, the consensus was that the Emmys were bad."

=== Ratings ===
The broadcast received 17.63 million viewers, the largest audience in total viewers since 2005.
