= Diego Klattenhoff =

Canadian actor (born 1979)

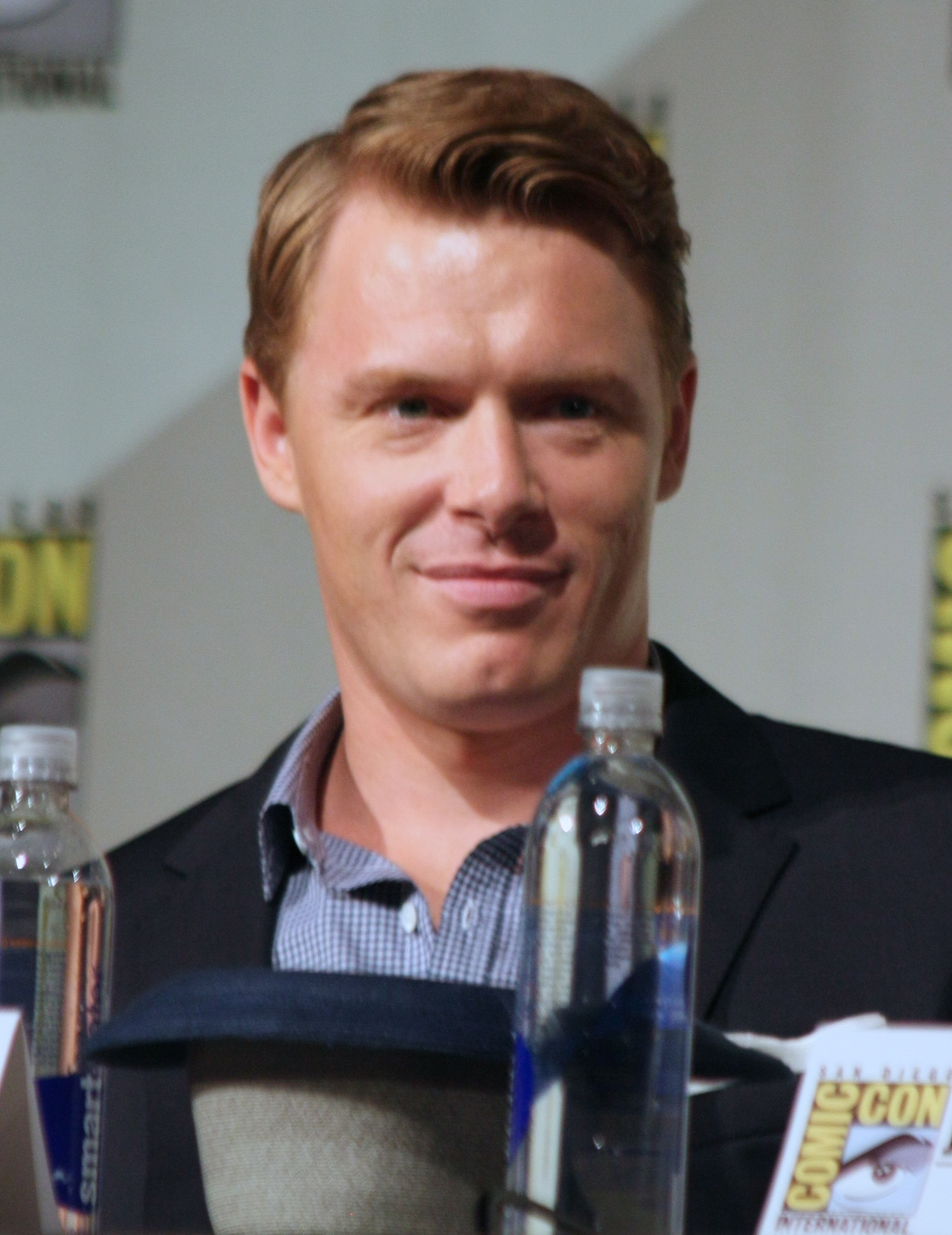
- Klattenhoff at the 2013 San Diego Comic Con
- Born: November 30, 1979 (age 46); French River, Nova Scotia, Canada
- Occupation: Actor
- Years active: 2001–present

Diego Klattenhoff (born November 30, 1979) is a Canadian actor known for his portrayals of Mike Faber in the Showtime series Homeland and as FBI Special Agent Donald Ressler in The Blacklist. He has also appeared as Derek in Whistler, Ivan in Men in Trees as well as having a minor role in Mean Girls as Shane Oman.

== Early life ==
Klattenhoff was born in French River, Pictou County, Nova Scotia. He moved to Toronto at the age of 19 to pursue an acting career. For a number of years, he worked as a bartender while studying in theater workshops. His father was originally from Germany and settled in Canada before Klattenhoff was born.

== Career ==
Klattenhoff studied with some of Canada's most respected acting coaches, including David Rotenberg, Bruce Clayton and Rae Ellen Bodie. His first notable acting role was in Mean Girls (2004). He followed that with a string of appearances in notable TV shows like Smallville and Stargate SG-1, and films like Lucky Number Slevin (2006). Since 2006, he has been in recurring roles like Young Jacob in CBC Television's At the Hotel, Derek in CTV's Whistler, Ivan Palacinke in ABC's Men in Trees and Mike Callahan in NBC's Mercy.

Klattenhoff appeared in Homeland as Mike Faber, a Marine Captain whose best friend returns to the U.S. after disappearing in Iraq eight years earlier. He and the cast were nominated once for a Screen Actors Guild Award for Best Cast, and twice for a PAAFTJ Television Awards for Best Cast in a Drama Series. He has also guest starred on television series such as Psych, Supernatural, 24, and Falling Skies.

Klattenhoff starred in J. J. Abrams's television film Anatomy of Hope and appeared in the Guillermo del Toro film Pacific Rim (2013) and the sci-fi thriller After Earth (2013). In March 2013, Klattenhoff joined the cast of the NBC thriller The Blacklist, as FBI Special Agent Donald Ressler. The show premiered on September 23, 2013, to 12.6 million viewers. Klattenhoff starred in the Canadian science fiction film Radius (2017).

== Filmography ==
=== Film ===
Year	Title	Role	Notes
2002	Straight in the Face	Daniel	Short film
2003	Autobiography of an Insect	Cameron	Short film
2003	Blessings	Benny	Television movie
2003	Family Curse	N/A	Television movie
2004	Mean Girls	Shane Oman	
2004	Cube Zero	Quigley	
2005	Ice Princess	Kyle Dayton	
2005	Murder in the Hamptons	Traffic Cop	Television movie
2005	The Last Hit	Sasha	
2005	Dry Whiskey	Terry	Short film
2005	Shania: A Life in Eight Albums	Paul	Television movie
2005	Recipe for a Perfect Christmas	Zach	Television movie
2005	Yesteryears	N/A	Television movie
2006	Lucky Number Slevin	Ginger	
2006	Fallen	Nathaniel	Uncredited
2006	Firestorm: Last Stand at Yellowstone	Willis Lee	Television movie
2007	Fire Serpent	Young Dutch	Television movie
2008	Lost Behind Bars	Charlie Quinn	Television movie
2008	The Informers	Dirk	
2009	Anatomy of Hope	Brendan Casey	Television movie
2010	The Dry Land	Henry	
2012	Unconditional	Billy	
2013	Kilimanjaro	Troy	
2013	After Earth	Veteran Ranger	
2013	Pacific Rim	Yancy Becket	
2016	Lavender	Alan	
2017	Radius	Liam	

=== Television ===
Year	Title	Role	Notes
2001–2002	Doc	Jason	2 episodes
2002	Witchblade	Uncredited	Episode: "Destiny"
2003	Wild Card	N/A	Episode: "Pilot"
2003	Mutant X	Janitor #1/Johnny Cummings	Episode: "Shadows of Darkness"
2003	Veritas: The Quest	Tymus	Episode: "Avalon"
2004	1-800-Missing	Brad Whitman	Episode: "One Night Stand"
2004	Sue Thomas: F.B.Eye	Jason Albright	Episode: "The Bounty Hunter"
2005	Smallville	Josh Greenfield	Episode: "Krypto"
2005	Stargate SG-1	Team Leader	Episode: "Ex Deus Machina"
2006	At the Hotel	Young Jacob	6 episodes Recurring role (Season 1)
2006	Psych	Dylan Maxwell	Episode: "Speak Now or Forever Hold Your Piece"
2006	Supernatural	Duane Tanner	Episode: "Croatoan"
2007	Whistler	Derek	12 episodes Recurring role (Season 2)
2008	Men in Trees	Ivan Palacinke	6 episodes Recurring role (Season 2)
2009	The Listener	Tom Crawford	Episode: "Emotional Rescue"
2009	ER	Jay	Episode: "Shifting Equilibrium"
2009	24	Sergeant Cadden	2 episodes
2009–2010	Mercy	Mike Callahan	22 episodes Main role (Season 1)
2011	Falling Skies	Lieutenant Danner	Episode: "Mutiny"
2012	Longmire	Eli	Episode: "The Cancer"
2011–2013	Homeland	Mike Faber	25 episodes Main role (Seasons 1–2); Guest role (Season 3); Nominated—Screen Actors Guild Award for Outstanding Performance by an Ensemble in a Drama Series
2013–2023	The Blacklist	Donald Ressler	218 episodes Main role (Seasons 1–10)
2024	Blue Bloods	Officer Michael Tate	Episode: "Without Fear or Favor"
2025	Tracker	Roger McLaren	Episode: "The Mercy Seat"
2026	The Borderline		
