= Hrach Titizian =

American actor

- Born: Los Angeles, California, United States
- Occupations: actor, producer
- Years active: 2000-present

Hrach Titizian is an American television, film and stage actor, and producer. He is best known for his portrayal of CIA analyst Danny Galvez on the first two seasons of Showtime's Homeland.

== Early life and education ==
Hrach Titizian was born in California to ethnic Armenian emigrant parents. His father was born in Lebanon and his mother in Jordan, while his grandparents were Armenians from Iraq and Syria.

He grew up in Glendale, California. He attended Armenian school and is able to speak, read, and write Armenian fluently.

As a child, Titizian would entertain family friends by singing and doing impersonations. He decided at age 19 to pursue a career as a professional actor, but did not inform his parents he had dropped out of college. He got a job delivering flowers to pay for drama lessons, and for nearly a year pretended he was still attending college. After he signed with an agent, his parents discovered his deception, but Titizian refused to give up acting.

== Filmography ==
=== Film ===
Year	Title	Role	Notes
2007	The Kingdom	Suicide bomber	
2008	Float	Gevorg Manoogian	also producer
2009	The Men Who Stare at Goats	Kidnapper No. 1	
2011	L.A., I Hate You	Araz	
2012	Night of the Templar	Melkon	
2013	Small Fish	Daveed	short (also producer)

=== Television ===
Year	Title	Role	Notes
2001	The Beast	Steve Jordan	6 episodes
2003	NCIS	Tariq Abassi	
2003	Las Vegas	Doug Nasralian	
2004	The Shield	Lernig	
2007	24	Zamil Kouri	2 episodes
2010	24	Nabeel	6 episodes
2010	NCIS: Los Angeles	Taxi driver	
2011–2012	Homeland	Danny Galvez	15 episodes
2013	Castle	Dixon	Episode: "The Human Factor"
2014	Unforgettable	Samir Bensaidi	
2015	Bones	Sanjar Zamani	
2016	Bosch	Det. Hamo Petrossian	Episode: "Who's Lucky Now?"
2018	Take Two	Aram Nazarian	Episode: "Taken"
2018	S.W.A.T.	Peter Melkonian	Episode: "Fire and Smoke"
2020–2021	The Rookie	Ruben Derian	3 episodes

=== Theatre ===
Year	Title	Role	Notes
2009	Bengal Tiger at the Baghdad Zoo	Uday Hussein	Kirk Douglas Theatre
