= List of Brotherhood episodes =

Brotherhood, an American television drama series created by Blake Masters, premiered on July 9, 2006, on the cable network Showtime in the United States. It ended its first season on September 24, 2006. The show's second season debuted on September 30, 2007, and ended on December 2, 2007. The show's third and final season premiered on November 2, 2008, and concluded on December 21, 2008. There are eleven episodes in the first season, ten in the second, and eight in the third – twenty-nine episodes aired, in total. The episodes are approximately 50 minutes long each.

Brotherhood is set in Providence, Rhode Island and centers on the Irish-American Caffee brothers, who hail from a fictional working-class neighborhood known as "The Hill". Tommy Caffee (Jason Clarke) is a respected local politician; he is a member of the Rhode Island House of Representatives. Michael Caffee (Jason Isaacs) is a professional criminal who is involved with the Irish Mob of New England. Throughout the series, the brothers' professional and private lives are intertwined.

The first and second seasons have been released on DVD in Region 1 by CBS Home Entertainment (distributed by Paramount).

The episode titles are references to religious texts for the first season and Bob Dylan lyrics for the second season. The referenced text is written in italics below the title (for the Bible references, the King James Version is used). The episode titles for the third season are paraphrased quotes from Shakespeare plays.

== Series overview ==
| Season | Episodes | Originally released | |
| Season | Episodes | First released | Last released |
|---|---|---|---|
| 1 | 11 | July 9, 2006 | September 24, 2006 |
| 2 | 10 | September 30, 2007 | December 2, 2007 |
| 3 | 8 | November 2, 2008 | December 21, 2008 |

== Episodes ==
=== Season 1 (2006) ===
| No. overall | No. in season | Title | Directed by | Written by | Original release date | Prod. code | US viewers (millions) |
|---|---|---|---|---|---|---|---|
| 1 | 1 | "Mark 8:36" | Phillip Noyce | Blake Masters | July 9, 2006 | 1-01 | 0.454 |
For what shall it profit a man, if he shall gain the whole world, and lose his own soul? State Representative Tommy Caffee is a rising star in Rhode Island politics and the political boss of his home ward. The murder of local gangster Patty Mullin opens the door to the return of Tommy's brother, Michael Caffee, whom Patty had sworn to kill. Michael locates his old partner, Pete McGonagle, and starts to reassert himself in Providence. Irish mob boss Freddie Cork threatens to have Michael killed unless Tommy throws some lucrative State contracts his way. Detective Declan Giggs, a childhood friend of the Caffees, begins investigating Michael's return. Tommy's wife, Eileen Caffee, deals with her own demons via drugs, alcohol and a string of extramarital affairs.
| 2 | 2 | "Genesis 27:29" | Ed Bianchi | Henry Bromell | July 16, 2006 | 1-02 | 0.158 |
Let people serve thee, and nations bow down to thee: be lord over thy brethren, and let thy mother's sons bow down to thee: cursed be every one that curseth thee, and blessed be he that blesseth thee. Michael and Pete force a local merchant to sell them her store. When the merchant goes to Tommy to complain, Tommy palms her off to Declan, who compromises himself by making the complaint go away. Tommy's efforts to stop a new highway from bisecting The Hill include a deal with the mysterious power broker Judd and lead him to bribe and blackmail two of his fellow representatives. The conflict between Eileen's public demeanor and private pain is temporarily set aside when she learns that her sister-in-law is having medical problems.
| 3 | 3 | "Matthew 13:57" | Jean de Segonzac | Dawn Prestwich & Nicole Yorkin | July 23, 2006 | 1-03 | N/A |
And they were offended in him. But Jesus said unto them, A prophet is not without honour, save in his own country, and in his own house. A garbage strike forces Tommy to mediate between the unions, which are controlled by Freddie, and the mayor. He must turn to Judd to end the strike. Michael learns that his old girlfriend, Kath Perry, is now married with two children. Carl ends his relationship with Eileen. Michael struggles to come to terms with the changes in the neighborhood.
| 4 | 4 | "Matthew 5:6" | Ed Bianchi | Blake Masters | July 30, 2006 | 1-04 | N/A |
Blessed are they which do hunger and thirst after righteousness: for they shall be filled. On information from Moe Riley, Treasury agents raid Rose Caffee's residence looking for counterfeit money. They are unsuccessful, but the scandal costs Tommy both politically and financially, so he pledges his loyalty to the speaker of the house. Michael frames Moe for murder in revenge.
| 5 | 5 | "Matthew 12:25" | Steve Shill | Henry Bromell | August 6, 2006 | 1-05 | 0.185 |
And Jesus knew their thoughts, and said unto them, Every kingdom divided against itself is brought to desolation; and every city or house divided against itself shall not stand. Michael and Pete want to play on Freddie Cork's softball team, but he refuses. Michael then seeks help from Terry Mulligan, a bar owner. Rose fights against layoffs and outsourcing in her sewing factory, but loses her job as well as a result of speaking up. The Speaker seeks to build a new waste management station in Tommy's district, prompting him to seek fair compensation for those affected.
| 6 | 6 | "Samyutta 11:10" | Leslie Libman | Dawn Prestwich & Nicole Yorkin | August 13, 2006 | 1-06 | N/A |
All-conquering, all-knowing, intelligent; with regard to all things, unadhering; all-abandoning, released in the ending of craving: him I call a man who lives alone. Michael helps Declan dispose of a body after Declan's partner, Ralph Mango, unwittingly shoots an undercover FBI agent. Eileen's drug use intensifies and she is arrested for erratic behaviour. Tommy's eldest daughter, Mary Rose, is caught trying some of her mother's drugs by Michael, who gives her a job in his store to keep an eye on her. Tommy uses his political influence to turn a profit.
| 7 | 7 | "Genesis 27:39" | Steve Shill | Blake Masters | August 20, 2006 | 1-07 | N/A |
And Isaac his father answered and said unto him, Behold, thy dwelling shall be the fatness of the earth, and of the dew of heaven from above. Michael persuades Tommy to organize a fundraiser to help a neighborhood theater whose owner owes Michael money. The whole neighborhood comes together for the grand opening, but Freddie steals the proceeds and the cinema is forced to close. Rose starts a new job in a store. Declan tries to recruit union leader Marty Trio as a witness.
| 8 | 8 | "Job 31:5–6" | Nick Gomez | Henry Bromell | August 27, 2006 | 1-08 | N/A |
If I have walked with vanity, or if my foot hath hasted to deceit; Let me be weighed in an even balance that God may know mine integrity. As Rose prepares a surprise birthday party for him, Michael and Kath drive down to New Jersey on a mission from Freddie. When the deal goes bad, Michael turns to violence. Despite this, Kath remains by his side, causing him to realize how much he still cares for her. When the House's new Speaker attempts to siphon funds from The Hill, Tommy works to foil the scheme. Meanwhile, Pete figures out the truth behind Eileen's problems and offers to help.
| 9 | 9 | "Ecclesiastes 7:2" | Henry Bromell | Blake Masters | September 10, 2006 | 1-09 | N/A |
It is better to go to the house of mourning, than to go to the house of feasting: for that is the end of all men; and the living will lay it to his heart. A bus crash on the way back from a football game leaves several residents of The Hill dead. The accident was caused by the suicide of Freddie Cork's son, who was homosexual. Michael uses this information to manipulate Freddie. Freddie pressures Tommy into ensuring that his son receives a catholic burial. Carl is also killed in the crash and Eileen resolves to atone for her sins. Marty Trio's wife is also killed and he finally decides to work with the police.
| 10 | 10 | "Vivekchaudamani: 51" | Brian Kirk | Dawn Prestwich & Nicole Yorkin | September 17, 2006 | 1–10 | N/A |
A father has got his sons and others to free him from his debts, but he has got none but himself to remove his bondage. Neil Caffee arrives in town and Michael and Tommy form an uneasy alliance to get rid of their father. Rose confronts Michael about how he makes his living. Pete again struggles with his addiction after Michael orders him to kill a fourteen-year-old drug dealer and this time Eileen comes to his aid. Tommy discovers that his daughter has been working for Michael, ending their period of co-operation.
| 11 | 11 | "Matthew 22:10" | Ed Bianchi | Story by : Blake Masters & Henry Bromell; Teleplay by : Blake Masters | September 24, 2006 | 1–11 | 0.170 |
So those servants went out into the highways, and gathered together all as many as they found, both bad and good: and the wedding was furnished with guests. Everyone in The Hill attends a big Irish wedding, as Tommy tries to avoid a legal trap set up by ambitious U.S. Attorney Ellis Franklin, who has promised him immunity if he will testify about Michael's dealings with Freddie. He must also protect his brother from Moe Riley, who has been released from prison and ordered by Freddie to kill Michael. Declan finds his partner may be corrupt and must decide where his loyalty lies. At the wedding, Eileen consoles the bride-to-be and reconnects with some old friends.

=== Season 2 (2007) ===
| No. overall | No. in season | Title | Directed by | Written by | Original release date | Prod. code | US viewers (millions) |
|---|---|---|---|---|---|---|---|
| 12 | 1 | "One Too Many Mornings 3:4–8" | Phillip Noyce | Blake Masters | September 30, 2007 | 2-01 | 0.371 |
You can say it just as good / You're right from your side / I'm right from mine / We're both just one too many mornings / An' a thousand miles behind Tommy and Eileen find it difficult to keep up the appearance of a happy marriage for the sake of Tommy's political career as Tommy tries to outsmart Franklin. The now-incapacitated Michael, who has no memory of the night of his attack, tries to reclaim his territory but his condition makes it troublesome. Michael asks Declan to find his assailant, not knowing it actually is Declan. Freddie puts Michael to use. Declan gets ostracized at home and at work, launching him into a dangerous downwards spiral.
| 13 | 2 | "Down in the Flood 3:5–6" | Brian Kirk | Henry Bromell | October 7, 2007 | 2-02 | 0.517 |
Now, it's king for king / Queen for queen Tommy turns to his sister, Mary-Kate, rather than his wife, Eileen, as the planning for his re-election campaign commences. To the dismay of Rose, Michael and Tommy's Irish cousin Colin Carr returns to Providence. He finds employment through Tommy but is displeased with his work. Declan and Cassie have dinner with Cassie's parents. Michael teams up with Moe for a truck heist.
| 14 | 3 | "The Lonesome Death of...4:7–8" | Nick Gomez | Blake Masters | October 14, 2007 | 2-03 | N/A |
Stared at the person who killed for no reason / Who just happened to be feelin' that way without warnin' Michael and Eileen cope with the death of a mutual friend with the help of Colin. Freddie tries to avoid all-out war with the Italians. The now-out of control Declan is enlisted by Franklin as a spy in the Irish mob. Eileen and Tommy's tense relationship grows even more volatile. Tommy handles a situation involving the Speaker of the House's mistress and makes a decision about his own private life.
| 15 | 4 | "Not Dark Yet 3:5–6" | Henry Bromell | Henry Bromell | October 21, 2007 | 2-04 | 0.335 |
Sometimes my burden seems more than I can bear / It's not dark yet, but it's getting there Rose is the catalyst of a disagreement between her sons, which leads Michael to hinder Tommy's real estate deal. Freddie tries to use Declan's status as a police officer to settle some unrest and the two grow closer. Eileen tries to cover up her daughter's delinquent behavior and finds some common ground with Kath in the process. Tommy continues to see his mistress, Dana.
| 16 | 5 | "Dear Landlord 1:3–4" | Ed Bianchi | Blake Masters | October 28, 2007 | 2-05 | 0.282 |
My burden is heavy / My dreams are beyond control Tommy loses parts of his usual support network and tries to keep his life on track. Michael considers a change in his lifestyle. Colin finds his father, but gets a less than warm welcome. Freddie asks Declan to locate a business associate.
| 17 | 6 | "True Love Tends to Forget 1:1–4" | Thomas Carter | Henry Bromell | November 4, 2007 | 2-06 | N/A |
I'm getting weary looking in my baby's eyes / When she's near me she's so hard to recognize / I finally realize there's no room for regret / True love, true love, true love tends to forget Tommy makes an effort to clean up a crime-ridden neighborhood in The Hill. Michael tries to assert power at home as he and Kath look at the possibility of having a child. Eileen has dinner with wives of other politicians and gains some useful insight. Rose struggles with the realities of getting older.
| 18 | 7 | "Only a Pawn...1:7–8" | Blake Masters | Blake Masters | November 11, 2007 | 2-07 | 0.342 |
But he can't be blamed / He's only a pawn in their game Complications arise on election day, causing Tommy to seek the support of his friends and family to secure his re-election. Mary-Kate helps her brother out but is exasperated by what she has to do. Nozzoli asks Michael to drive an out-of-town hit man to a job and Michael and the hit man find that they have very differing views.
| 19 | 8 | "Shelter from the Storm 1:1–2" | Michael Corrente | Henry Bromell | November 18, 2007 | 2-08 | 0.541 |
'Twas in another lifetime, one of toil and blood / When blackness was a virtue and the road was full of mud Judd's declining health affects Colin and Tommy. Michael feeds Franklin information to keep Freddie in jail. Declan is surprised by his new assignment and tries to clear his conscience of the dirty dealings around him. Eileen volunteers at social services but the work environment is not what she expected.
| 20 | 9 | "Call Letter Blues 1:2–6" | Alik Sakharov | Henry Bromell | November 25, 2007 | 2-09 | N/A |
Listenin' to them church bells tone / Yes, I walked all night long / Listenin' to them church bells tone / Either someone needing mercy / Or maybe something I've done wrong Rose walks out on her family Thanksgiving morning, leaving the remaining Caffees to fend for themselves. Colin gets an important mission from Michael, who promises him a Thanksgiving dinner with the family as a reward. In exchange for information, Freddie and Marty Trio are allowed holiday furlough at a safe location, with an unexpected outcome.
| 21 | 10 | "Things Have Changed 1:7–8" | Ed Bianchi | Blake Masters | December 2, 2007 | 2–10 | 0.371 |
Standing on the gallows with my head in a noose / Any minute now I'm expecting all hell to break loose In the aftermath of the holiday furlough, Franklin launches an investigation. As his life is threatened by Freddie and Nozzoli, Michael ties up some loose ends. Declan is displeased with his new job and makes an important decision. Freddie turns to Declan for protection. Michael indirectly interferes with Tommy's career as Tommy makes a bid for the Speaker's chair. Eileen makes a stand against Tommy's extramarital affairs. As old family ties are severed, new ones are born.

=== Season 3 (2008) ===
| No. overall | No. in season | Title | Directed by | Written by | Original release date | Prod. code |
|---|---|---|---|---|---|---|
| 22 | 1 | "Uneasy Lies the Head" | Henry Bromell | Henry Bromell | November 2, 2008 | 3-01 |
From Henry IV, Part 2 Tommy, frustrated with being Speaker Donatello's errand boy, considers a potentially risky career change. Michael and Tommy, now not speaking to each other, meet at their mother's birthday party, where the ailing Rose tries to hide her condition. Tommy offers the justice-seeking Declan a new job. Eileen becomes more invested in her job at social services while preparing for the birth of her fourth child.
| 23 | 2 | "Things Badly Begun" | Nick Gomez | Blake Masters | November 9, 2008 | 3-02 |
From Macbeth Tommy strong-arms the mayor for his support of a development deal, but hits a roadblock due to Michael's business dealings. Rose investigates her mysterious ailment. Eileen is passed over for promotion at work due to her pregnancy. Declan's investigation gets off to a slow start. Freddie gets a new job and rises to the occasion.
| 24 | 3 | "Let Rome into Tiber Melt..." | Ed Bianchi | Karen Hall | November 16, 2008 | 3-03 |
From Antony and Cleopatra A fire kills several Latino squatters and an Irish firefighter, leaving Tommy struggling with the political fallout. Colin's relationship with Kath starts affecting his ability to collect money for Michael. Declan uncovers a lead and brings in another investigator. Moe turns to Freddie for protection after his volatile nature gets him into a predicament.
| 25 | 4 | "The Course of True Love Never Did Run Smooth" | Seith Mann | Henry Bromell | November 23, 2008 | 3-04 |
From A Midsummer Night's Dream The Labor Day holiday weekend finds Michael increasingly paranoid and edgy and he counsels with Freddie. During a weekend trip to a vacation home, Tommy proposes a radical lifestyle change to Eileen. Declan and Cassie's getaway highlights the growing problems in their rocky marriage. Colin and Kath have a romantic get-together.
| 26 | 5 | "Give Me the Ocular Proof..." | Alik Sakharov | Blake Masters | November 30, 2008 | 3-05 |
From Othello Tommy tries to rekindle his friendship with Declan, who grows suspicious of Tommy's motives for doing so. Tensions build between Michael and Colin as they help Freddie plan and carry out a heist and Michael uses his power to hurt Colin. Rose learns more of her illness. The FBI approaches Michael.
| 27 | 6 | "The Chimes at Midnight" | Ed Bianchi | Karen Hall | December 7, 2008 | 3-06 |
From Henry IV, Part 2 Declan becomes more obsessed with the investigation, leading him to break some rules to get the information he desires. Speaker Donatello draws Tommy back in to help pass the budget, causing Eileen to worry. Rose and Colin grow closer, which makes Michael even more volatile and his relationship with Nozzoli grows more tense as a result.
| 28 | 7 | "All the Interim is like a Phantasma..." | Tim Hunter | Henry Bromell | December 14, 2008 | 3-07 |
From Julius Caesar Eileen's pregnancy confines her to bed as the family gathers to support her, resulting in both reconciliations and schisms. Tommy asks for Michael's help when he realizes that Declan's investigation is starting to become a nuisance. The tensions between the Italian and Irish mobs reaches a high point and Michael takes a stand.
| 29 | 8 | "Birnam Wood Come to Dunsinane" | Blake Masters | Blake Masters | December 21, 2008 | 3-08 |
From Macbeth The Irish mob of Providence prepares for all-out war while Michael obsesses over finding Colin and Kath. Tommy finally sees his opportunity to seize Speaker Donatello's chair, but has to make a commitment to Freddie while at the same time outmaneuvering the FBI to get it. Declan and his partner search for Michael but the FBI and the Italian mob are also looking for him, which results in complications. Michael and Tommy come face-to-face and in the aftermath the lives of several people with ties to the brothers are drastically changed.
