= The First Day of School =

"The First Day of School" may refer to:

- "The First Day of School", a 1987 episode of Full House
- "The First Day of School", a 2010 episode of Rubicon
