= Brotherhood (American TV series) =

- Promotional art for the first season.
- Genre: Crime drama Political thriller
- Created by: Blake Masters
- Written by: Blake Masters (13 episodes); Henry Bromell (12 episodes); Dawn Prestwich (3 episodes); Nicole Yorkin (3 episodes); Karen Hall (2 episodes)
- Directed by: Ed Bianchi (7 episodes); Henry Bromell (3 episodes); Nick Gomez (3 episodes) and others
- Starring: Jason Isaacs; Jason Clarke; Fionnula Flanagan; Annabeth Gish; Kevin Chapman; Ethan Embry; Brían F. O'Byrne; Fiona Erickson; Stivi Paskoski
- Country of origin: United States
- Original language: English
- No. of seasons: 3
- No. of episodes: 29 (list of episodes)

Production
- Executive producers: Blake Masters; Henry Bromell; Elizabeth Guber Stephen; Karen Hall (Season 3)
- Production location: Rhode Island
- Cinematography: Ron Fortunato (Pilot); Ernest Holzman (Season 1); Teodoro Maniaci (Seasons 2–3)
- Editors: Terry Kelley (12 episodes); Anthony Redman (12 episodes); Adam Wolfe (3 episodes); Lise Angelica Johnson (2 episodes); Neil Travis (1 episode)
- Camera setup: Single camera
- Running time: 50–55 minutes
- Production companies: Gangtackle Productions; Mandalay Television; Showtime Networks

Original release
- Network: Showtime
- Release: July 9, 2006 – December 21, 2008

Brotherhood is an American crime drama television series created by Blake Masters about the intertwining lives of the Irish-American Caffee brothers from Providence, Rhode Island: Tommy (Jason Clarke) is a local politician and Michael (Jason Isaacs) is a gangster involved with New England's Irish Mob. The show also features their mother Rose (Fionnula Flanagan), cousin Colin Carr (Brían F. O'Byrne), childhood friend and Rhode Island state detective Declan Giggs (Ethan Embry), Irish mob boss Freddie Cork (Kevin Chapman), Tommy's wife Eileen (Annabeth Gish), and Michael's criminal partner Pete McGonagle (Stivi Paskoski).

Brotherhood was originally broadcast by the premium cable network Showtime in the United States from July 9, 2006, to December 21, 2008, with the show's three seasons consisting of eleven, ten and eight episodes. The show was not renewed after its third season, which Showtime later confirmed was the last. The series was produced and almost entirely written by Masters and Henry Bromell. It was filmed on location in Providence, Rhode Island.

Brotherhood received widespread critical acclaim—with critics particularly praising Masters and Bromell's nuanced writing and the central performances of Clarke and Isaacs—but did not attract a large audience. The show won a Peabody Award.

== Production ==
=== Conception ===
Brotherhood was created by New England native Blake Masters. Prior to creating the series, Masters made a living selling screenplays to film studios; however, he never got an original project produced. Masters' pitched Brotherhood to Executive Producer Elizabeth Guber Stephen as a feature film; the premise was inspired by the real-life Bulger brothers from Massachusetts: William M. Bulger was a prominent state politician and his brother, James J. Bulger, was the leader of the Irish-American mob Winter Hill Gang. Stephen told Masters and his agent Brant Rose that it would work better as a series. Masters agreed to adapt it into a television series, reasoning that "the dynamic between the brothers was sustainable and compelling." Stephen brought Masters to present the idea to premium cable network Showtime, who were immediately receptive and financed the production of a pilot episode. After the pilot had been shot, it was shown to the Showtime executives, who ordered an entire season. Because of Masters' inexperience in producing television, Showtime executives asked him to find someone to help him spearhead the project. Masters, a fan of Homicide: Life on the Street, suggested Henry Bromell, who had previously worked on Homicide as a writer/executive producer. A meeting was arranged between Masters and Bromell through Showtime. Bromell was impressed with the pilot and accepted Masters' offer to join the production crew.

=== Crew ===
Executive producers Masters and Bromell served as showrunners and head writers during the production of the show's three seasons. Masters wrote five episodes of the first and second seasons, which consisted of eleven and ten episodes, respectively, and three of the third eight-episode season; Bromell wrote three episodes of the first season, five of the second and three of the third. The show has had three writers other than Masters and Bromell: the writing team of Dawn Prestwich and Nicole Yorkin, who wrote three episodes of the first season and served as co-executive producers, and executive producer Karen Hall, who wrote two episodes of the third season.

The pilot episode, "Mark 8:36", was directed by Australian director Phillip Noyce. Noyce's background in film drew some praise for his strong visual sense direction of the pilot but was also criticized for distracting from the writing and not fitting with the direction of later episodes. Noyce also directed the second season premiere. Veteran television director Ed Bianchi directed seven episodes of the show, including the first and second season finales, making him the show's most frequent director. Other recurring directors include Nick Gomez, who directed three episodes, and Steve Shill, Alik Sakharov, and Brian Kirk, who directed two episodes each. Jean de Segonzac, Leslie Libman, Thomas Carter, Michael Corrente, Seith Mann, and Tim Hunter directed one episode each. Masters and Bromell have also directed the series, with Bromell having directed three episodes and Masters two.

=== Sets and locations ===
The series was filmed largely on location in Providence, Rhode Island. After producer Elizabeth Guber Stephen was told they couldn't shoot in Boston due to budgetary reasons, Stephen worked out a deal with the Rhode Island Film Office. Stephen and her team also helped write the tax incentive legislation for film and television production in Rhode Island.

The Providence Journal editorialized on the production as follows:

The production of Showtime's The Brotherhood has enlivened Providence streets on and off for months ... An occasional loss of parking spaces to film crews and tax dollars for incentives to bring them here sets some teeth to grinding, but few don't feel the tingle of curiosity when approaching one of those star trailers ... Movies mean money, and film festivals lubricate our celloid (sic) culture in preparation for more.

— Editorial, Our own little Hollywood, Providence Journal.

Some scenes were filmed at the Olneyville New York System Restaurant in Providence and Woonsocket, Rhode Island.

== Cast and characters ==
Actor	Character	Notes
Jason Isaacs	Michael Caffee	A lifelong gangster who has returned home to Providence, R.I., after a self-imposed seven-year exile after a contract was put on him. He is hoping to pick up where he left off. At the end of the first season, Michael is attacked and severely beaten by Declan. At the start of the second season, Michael is suffering from brain trauma and blackout, and has no memory of who attacked him. However, he tries to prove to Freddie that he is ready to go back to work for the mob. By the third season, Michael is in charge, and faces serious trouble with the Italian mob leader and with his own girlfriend and cousin. Michael is inspired by and modeled after Whitey Bulger, an ex-fugitive Irish mob boss from South Boston, Massachusetts, who was still on the run at that time. Jason Isaacs once described his character as follows: "Well actually, Michael Caffee is not a bad guy. I wouldn't have done this if he was a bad guy. He's a really interesting man. He has a really strict ethical code that he adheres to and he thinks he is better for the neighborhood and the future of the city than his brother is. He thinks his brother is corrupt, he's part of the system."
Jason Clarke	Tommy Caffee	Husband, father, brother and ambitious member of the Rhode Island House of Representatives who is not above bending the rules. The second season finds him still married, but shows bitterness towards his wife after she reveals her drug use and affairs. He has a relationship with Dana Chase, played by Janel Moloney. He is currently seeking re-election at his position. He is presumably inspired by Whitey Bulger's brother, former Massachusetts Senate President Billy Bulger. By season three, Tommy and Eileen have reconciled because they are expecting their fourth child, a son. Tommy promises Eileen that he is getting out of politics, but his best plans may not come to fruition.
Annabeth Gish	Eileen Caffee	Tommy's lonely wife, who tries to fill the void in her life with drugs and an affair with the mailman. At the start of the second season, she and her husband are still living together, although they remain distant after she revealed everything to him. By the third season, she is working outside of the home until she and Tommy reach an uneasy reconciliation, as Eileen is pregnant with their fourth child, who is a son.
Fiona Erickson	Mary Rose Caffee	Tommy and Eileen's eldest daughter. Mary Rose has been in trouble for stealing and drug use, and her uncle Michael tries to talk sense into her, which her father resents. She is exceptionally observant, if not nosy, and what she discovers often has great bearing on both brothers' lives.
Fionnula Flanagan	Rose Caffee	The highly manipulative and needy mother of the Caffee brothers and sister Mary Kate, and overbearing mother-in-law to Eileen, Rose is the matriarch and neither of her sons dares to stand up to her. She has developed a close relationship with Colin, the Irish son of her late sister, who has come to Rhode Island to seek his family roots.
Ethan Embry	Declan Giggs	A Rhode Island state trooper who is investigating the Caffee brothers despite having known them since childhood, who often blurs the line between investigating them and protecting them. At the beginning of the second season, it is revealed that he has a fallout with his wife Cassie and is now separated from her. Disgraced, his police captain gives him one more shot at redemption: becoming a mole for Freddie Cork's activities and tie them to the Caffee brothers. In season three, he is conducting a major investigation of the interactions between Rhode Island state politics and the Italian and Irish mobs.
Kevin Chapman	Freddie Cork	An Irish-American gang leader and Michael's very stern, no nonsense boss in season one; he is frequently in conflict with Michael and he often blackmails Tommy. By season three, Michael is the boss, and Freddie works for him.
Stivi Paskoski, Alan Francis Sullivan (season 2)	Pete McGonagle	A recovering alcoholic, who quickly makes himself Michael's partner when Michael returns to town. Michael's return drives him to drink again, and Michael goes so far as to almost kill him. He is not seen in the first two episodes of the second season, but is told that he lands a job through Michael. It is revealed that Pete is in trouble with Italian mobs. At the beginning of the third episode of season 2, he is killed and his body dumped right on the Caffee's block. (series regular - season 1)
Brían F. O'Byrne	Colin Carr	The Caffees' cousin from Belfast, Northern Ireland, who joins the cast for the second season, as he tries to help both sides of his family business. At first, his aunt Rose thinks he's trouble and up to no good. Eventually, she helps him find his father, who turns out to be Senator Judd Fitzgerald, and she becomes his defender. By season three, he is Michael's loyal right-hand man. However, he is falling in love with Michael's girlfriend Kath, which Michael suspects. He has tried to keep at arm's length distance from Kath out of loyalty and fear of Michael. However, Michael's suspicions seem to be getting the better of him. (series regular - season 2-3)

=== Recurring characters ===
- Billy Smith as Jeff "Moe" Riley (Seasons 1–3) – One of Freddie's henchmen, he consistently shows a pathological lack of common sense and regard for other people, which makes him very unpopular with almost everyone, especially Michael. Thanks to events in the first season, Moe holds a grudge against Michael that persists through the whole series.
- Kerry O'Malley as Mary Kate Martinson, Michael and Tommy's sister
- Bates Wilder as Jimmy Martinson, Mary Kate's husband
- Madison Garland as Lila Caffee, Tommy and Eileen's daughter
- Kailey Gilbert as Noni Caffee, Tommy and Eileen's daughter
- Tina Benko as Kath Perry
- Karl Bury as Alex Byrne, Tommy's assistant (Seasons 1 & 2)
- Len Cariou as Judd Fitzgerald (Seasons 1 & 2)
- Kevin Conway as Neil Caffee
- John Fiore as Alphonse Nozzoli (Seasons 1-3)
- Michael Gaston as Mr. Speaker (Season 1)
- Damien Di Paola as Paul Carvalho
- Georgia Lyman as Cassie Giggs, Declan's wife
- Frank L. Ridley as Terry Mulligan
- Al Sapienza as Mayor Frank Panzarella
- Brian Scannell as Silent John
- Matt Servitto as Representative Donald Donatello, Speaker of the House
- Scottie Thompson as Shannon McCarthy (Season 1)

== Plot synopsis and episode list ==
=== Season 1: 2006 ===
The death of a local Irish mob figure, Patrick "Paddy" Mullin, allows for the return of Michael Caffee to "The Hill" neighborhood of Providence, Rhode Island. Caffee had been in hiding for seven years after Mullin had vowed to kill him. Upon his return, Michael relaunches his criminal business with his friend Pete McConagle. Michael's boss, Freddie Cork, tries to blackmail Michael's brother Tommy, a member of the Rhode Island House of Representatives, into assigning him lucrative contracts with a threat to kill Michael. Tommy refuses to be swayed and tells Freddie that he does not care about Michael. Michael manages to arrange a temporary truce with Freddie. Tommy's wife Eileen is keeping secrets from her family, such as her drug abuse and her affair with mailman Carl Hobbs.

Michael uses threats to take over a local store. Tommy defuses the owners' intention to press charges by passing her on to Declan Giggs, a cop who was once friends with the Caffees. Giggs tells her it is too dangerous to testify against the Irish gangs. Michael also takes over a local bar named Mulligans. He rekindles his relationship with Kath Parry and realises how much she cares for him when she stands by him through a shoot out with Russian mobsters.

Tommy turns to Judd for help in preventing a highway being built through "The Hill" and is forced to give up more of his independence. Carl ends his relationship with Eileen. Treasury agents raid Rose Caffee's residence, looking for counterfeit money belonging to Michael. They are unsuccessful, but the scandal costs Tommy further political capital and he pledges his loyalty to the speaker of the house. Tommy uses his political influence to turn a profit, but is outraged when he finds the speaker of the house stealing. Tommy maneuvers his way to the house majority leader position.

Michael helps Declan dispose of a body after Declan's partner unwittingly shoots an undercover FBI agent. Eileen's drug use intensifies and she is arrested for erratic behavior; Pete also gives in to his addiction, and Michael takes him to Alcoholics Anonymous. Michael catches Tommy's eldest daughter Mary Rose trying some of her mother's drugs, and he gives her a job in his store to keep an eye on her. Pete and Eileen realize their common ground.

A bus crash on the way back from a football game leaves several residents of "The Hill" dead. The accident was caused by the suicide of Freddie Cork's son, who was openly homosexual. Michael uses this information to manipulate Freddie. Freddie pressures Tommy into ensuring that his son receives a Roman Catholic requiem mass. Carl is also killed, and Eileen resolves to atone for her sins. Marty Trio's wife is also killed, and he finally decides to work with the police.

Neil Caffee arrives in town, and Michael and Tommy form an uneasy alliance to get rid of their father. Rose confronts Michael about how he makes his living. Tommy discovers that his daughter has been working for Michael, ending their period of cooperation. Everyone in "The Hill" attends a big Irish wedding, as Tommy Caffee tries to avoid a legal trap set up by an ambitious U.S. Attorney, who has promised him immunity if he will testify about Michael's dealing with Freddie. He must also protect his brother from being whacked by Moe Riley, who has been released from prison and is out for revenge. Declan finds his partner may be a dirty cop and must decide where his loyalty lies. He blames Michael for making him "go bad" and pistol whips him.

The titles of all episodes in this season are from religious texts.

=== Season 2: 2007 ===
Showtime renewed the show for a second season, consisting of 10 episodes (bringing the total number of episodes to 21.) Unlike episode titles from season one which were based Bible passages, season two episode titles were based on lyrics from songs written and performed by Bob Dylan. The first episode officially aired on September 30, 2007, with the season finale airing on December 2. However, on July 18, 2007, the first two episodes of season 2 were leaked to the internet via torrent.

The season begins a few months after the conclusion of season one. Michael has survived Declan's attack, though his awareness is compromised and he has no memory of the attack. Michael finds himself shut out of the mob's activity, with Freddie having sold the liquor store while Michael was sick. Desperate to prove his competence, Michael kills a Jewish gangster who owes Freddie money, but not before having the first in a series of paralyzing seizures. Tommy has grown closer to Judd as he continues to counter Franklin's efforts against both Michael and himself. Judd asks Tommy to rein in Rep. Paul Carvalho, the Portuguese representative who is publicly backing a rival (Portuguese) candidate for U.S. senate in the upcoming election. Ellis Franklin has Tommy sit for a deposition about Michael and Freddie, but when he fails to tell Franklin what he wants to hear, Franklin sets up one of his detectives as a businessman looking to bribe Tommy for a state contract. When Tommy sees through the trap, he sets up Carvalho with the same detective, stalling Franklin's investigation and neutering Carvahlo's support for the rival candidate. Declan spirals out of control after Cassie leaves him and Moe blackmails him, as Moe is the only one who knows Declan tried to kill Michael at the Finnerty wedding. However, Declan assures Moe that if anyone finds out about the wedding, everyone will find out about Moe's deal with the Secret Service.

=== Season 3: 2008 ===
The third season began airing on November 2, 2008 and consisted of 8 episodes. It ended on December 21, 2008. The titles of all episodes of season three are quotations from Shakespeare.

Season 3 begins in the late summer, some time after the events of Season 2. The fact that Tommy had known that Freddie planned to kill Michael at the Finnerty wedding and yet said nothing ruptured the brothers’ relationship, with no immediate prospect of reconciliation. Michael has developed severe paranoia and is now on medication for his psychosis. He is still an informant for Franklin, although this arrangement is imperilled when Paul Carvalho, the Portuguese politician whom Tommy had set up for bribery charges in Season 2, agrees to talk to the authorities and Jack Boyle arranges Freddie’s release from prison. Michael knows that Freddie will contract Nozzolli to kill him, so he attempts to remove Nozolli by implicating him in a deal to sell HGH supplied by a local dentist, and then exposing the scheme to Franklin. The DEA have been watching the dentist for months and swoop in first. Franklin does not care that Michael’s plan has failed, and mocks him. Michael beats him to death. Tommy is still majority leader, although his unsuccessful attempt at capturing the speakership has forced him to become Speaker Donatello's errand boy. This brings him into contact with Brian Kilpatrick, a developer who wants the state to buy decrepit industrial property on the city's waterfront. Eileen, now pregnant, is consequently finding her new duties at Social Services difficult. Tommy wants to quit politics and promises Eileen that they will leave The Hill within two years. The episode concludes with a meeting between Tommy, Kilpatrick, and the president of Bodie Company, with Tommy telling the president that he will get a lucrative stake in the waterfront if he buys all of the holdings of Tommy's Landowne development company.

== Cancellation ==
In April 2009, rumors began circulating that the show had been cancelled. In January, Robert Greenblatt, Showtime's entertainment president, was reportedly non-committal when asked if Brotherhood would be back.

In an interview with E! Online in mid-March 2009, actress Fionnula Flanagan said that the actors had yet to hear from the producers about a possible fourth season. That February, The Hollywood Reporter reported that Jason Clarke had been cast in an unnamed pilot for CBS. In June, Kevin Chapman, who played Freddie, was cast as Terrence Garrity, brother of the Sean character in the FX series Rescue Me. Television critics later pointed to the end of season three as a probable end for the series, saying that the finale seemed to convey a sense of closure with its wrapped up storylines.

On June 29, 2009, Showtime confirmed that the series would not be renewed, and that the third season DVD would be billed as "The Final Season."

== Themes ==
The series focuses on the concept of brotherhood through the antagonistic relationship between the Caffee brothers. Through its examination of family, the show makes loyalty a recurring theme. Though the two brothers follow different paths and try to assert their differences from one another, they often prove similar. The show portrays Michael and Tommy striving for the good of their neighborhood through politics and crime, which are often portrayed as similar. Corruption and the way it infiltrates families, neighborhoods and governments is another theme. The examination of big city corruption has been compared to the work of Sidney Lumet.

Masters has admitted an intention to make the city of Providence a character in the show. The Hollywood Reporter noted the parallels between the morally grey areas inhabited by the characters and the muted tones of their surroundings. "The Hill" is dominated by Irish Americans and the show has been characterised as examining ethnicity.

=== Michael's morality ===
In an interview relating to the series, Jason Isaacs described Michael as follows: "Well actually, Michael Caffee is not a bad guy. I wouldn't have done this if he was a bad guy. He's a really interesting man. He has a really strict ethical code that he adheres to and he thinks he is better for the neighborhood and the future of the city than his brother is. He thinks his brother is corrupt. He's part of the system."

== Reception ==
=== Ratings ===
Despite having a subpar total viewership of 540,000, Showtime renewed the series for a second season due to its critical acclaim. The second season aired in the fall of 2007 as the lead-out for Dexter, which helped boost ratings to 651,000 viewers. It was renewed for a third season consisting of eight episodes on January 21, 2008.

=== Critical response ===
Many critics compared the series to The Sopranos. Some felt that it was actually closer in tone to another HBO drama The Wire in portraying "a fine-textured portrait of a blue-collar city" and predicted the series would face a comparable struggle in finding an audience. LA Weekly stated that the show might be more satisfying in its emotional payoffs for viewers than the sixth season of The Sopranos. Critics have characterized the show as being part of a wave of programming that put Showtime on a level with their pay cable rival HBO for quality.

Critics praised the central performances of Clarke and Isaacs. They have also commented on the authenticity in casting down to the minor roles and the strong characterizations of the supporting cast. The Hollywood Reporter named the show as the one to watch over the summer it debuted and stated that the ensemble of well-drawn characters created a "reality that speaks to the collision of interests, the dispersal of power and the impossibility of effective compromise." The Phoenix singled out Annabeth Gish's against-type role as an adulterous addict as potentially redefining for her career. Phil Gallo of Variety said that Isaacs' performance as Michael provided the lifeblood of the series. Frazier Moore of the Seattle Post-Intelligencer described the show as a "masterpiece" and Gallo called it "the jewel Showtime has sought for years." Writing of the third season, Ginia Bellafante of The New York Times wrote, "No show on television has better captured the will to ethnic insularity".

On review aggregate website Rotten Tomatoes, season 1 has an approval rating of 71% based on 21 reviews. The site’s critics consensus reads, "Brotherhood achieves an authentic sense of place while unleashing ferociously good actors onto a story rife with thought-provoking moral quandaries, but some viewers may find the series too glum and patient in its storytelling." Season 2 has an approval rating of 80% based on 5 reviews. Season 3 has an approval rating of 88% based on 8 reviews.

Among the criticisms of the show was that it lacked the humorous approach of Italian-American gangster stories like A Bronx Tale, Goodfellas, and The Sopranos, resulting in the series incorporating more black humor into season two onward.

=== Accolades ===
The show was a 2006 Peabody Award winner.

== DVD release ==
Season	Episodes	Release date	Discs
1	11	September 26, 2006	3
2	10	October 7, 2008	3
3	8	September 22, 2009	2

== International broadcasters ==
Country	TV Network(s)	Series Premiere	Weekly Schedule
Australia	Showtime	April 2, 2007	Screened on showcase from 2008 onwards
Belgium	Acht	December, 2010	
Brazil	FX Latin America and Liv	2008–2010	
Bulgaria	Fox Crime	2007	
Canada	The Movie Network and Movie Central		Mon-Fri 11pm
Croatia	RTL	January 21, 2009	Wednesdays 10:00pm.
Finland	Jim	February 26, 2007	
Hong Kong	Fox Crime	July 16, 2007	Mondays 10pm
(Republic of Ireland) Ireland	3e	April 15, 2007/October 2006/November 2007	
Israel	Yes Stars Action	2006	
Italy	Cult TV	September 2008	
Japan	Fox Crime	June 7, 2007	Season 1 Mondays 8:00pm from July 12, 2010 (r.Tu, We, Sa, Su) Season 3 Thursdays 8:00pm from July 15, 2010 (r.Fr, Sa, Su, Mo)
Latvia	LNT	2011	Mon-Fri 10pm
Norway	TV2 Zebra	September 2008	Tuesdays 9:30pm
Philippines	Fox Crime	January 2008	Tuesday 10pm
Poland	Universal Channel	December 2007	
Portugal	FX and TVSeries	September 2007	
Slovenia	POP TV	January 2008	Saturday 10 pm
South Africa	M-Net	November 2006	
Sweden	SVT	January 2008	
Thailand	True Series	September 18, 2008	Thursday 10pm
Turkey	FX	April 2008	Thursday 10pm
United Kingdom	FX	October 2006	
United States	Showtime	July 9, 2006	
