= Berlin Station (TV series) =

American drama television series

- Genre: Drama; Spy; Thriller
- Created by: Olen Steinhauer
- Starring: Richard Armitage; Rhys Ifans; Leland Orser; Michelle Forbes; Richard Jenkins; Keke Palmer; Ashley Judd; John Doman; Tamlyn Tomita; Ismael Cruz Córdova
- Opening theme: "I'm Afraid of Americans" by David Bowie
- Composer: Reinhold Heil
- Country of origin: United States
- Original languages: English, German
- No. of seasons: 3
- No. of episodes: 29

Production
- Executive producers: Michaël Roskam; Olen Steinhauer; Bradford Winters; Jason Horwitch
- Production location: Berlin
- Running time: 45–61 minutes
- Production companies: Third State; Harbor Men Pictures (Season 1); Solid State Pictures (Season 3); Vanessa Productions, LTD.; Anonymous Content; Paramount Television; Studio Babelsberg

Original release
- Network: Epix
- Release: October 16, 2016 – February 17, 2019

Berlin Station is an American drama television series created by Olen Steinhauer. The series stars Richard Armitage, Rhys Ifans, Leland Orser, Michelle Forbes, Richard Jenkins, Keke Palmer, Ashley Judd, John Doman, Tamlyn Tomita, and Ismael Cruz Córdova. Bradford Winters had been showrunner for its first two seasons, with Jason Horwitch taking over for season 3.

A ten-episode first season premiered on Epix on October 16, 2016. On November 17, 2016, Epix renewed Berlin Station for a second season, originally planned to contain ten episodes, which premiered on October 15, 2017 and concluded a nine-episode-season-run on December 3, 2017. On December 6, 2017, Epix renewed the series for a third season, which premiered on December 2, 2018.

It was canceled on March 29, 2019, after three seasons.

In 2021, all three seasons were released on DVD from Paramount Home Entertainment.

== Plot ==
The story follows Daniel Miller (Richard Armitage), who has just arrived at the CIA station in Berlin, Germany. In season 1, Miller has a clandestine mission: to uncover the source of a leak who has supplied information to a now-famous whistleblower named Thomas Shaw. Guided by veteran Hector DeJean (Rhys Ifans), Daniel learns to contend with the rough-and-tumble world of the field agent: agent-running, deception, and the dangers and moral compromises. In season 2, four months after Miller was shot at the end of season 1, he recovered from his injuries sufficiently to be given a new clandestine assignment: to infiltrate a far-right German political party believed to be planning an act of terror right before an upcoming election.

== Cast ==
=== Main ===
- Richard Armitage as Daniel Miller, a cerebral CIA officer who shifts from working as an analyst at Langley headquarters in the US to serving as an undercover officer in Berlin and is tasked with finding a leak in CIA operations
- Rhys Ifans as Hector DeJean, a disillusioned veteran CIA officer with dubious tactics and many secrets
- Leland Orser as Robert Kirsch, a devoted and successful Deputy Chief who digs intelligence out of the city of Berlin through a mix of force, diligence, and cleverness
- Michelle Forbes as Valerie Edwards, the no-nonsense administrator who serves as a Berlin Station Internal Branch Chief, and later Station Chief
- Richard Jenkins as Steven Frost (seasons 1–2, recurring season 3), a veteran of the Cold War, who serves as the CIA's Chief of the Berlin Station in season 1 and is retired at the start of season 2
- Tamlyn Tomita as Sandra Abe (season 1), a quiet presence leading the efficient operation of Berlin Station while having an affair with her boss, Steven
- John Doman as Richard Hanes (season 2), the new American ambassador to Germany and an old friend of Steven's
- Keke Palmer as April Lewis (seasons 2–3), the new young case officer assigned to Berlin Station
- Ashley Judd as BB Yates (season 2, recurring season 3), Berlin's new Chief of Station, nicknamed "The Station Whisperer"
- Ismael Cruz Córdova as Rafael Torres (season 3), an officer for the Special Activities Center of the CIA, previously in the military

=== Recurring ===
- Mina Tander as Esther Krug, a German BfV agent and later the head of the BfV
- Mark Moses as Jason Wolfe, Berlin Station's supervisor at the CIA (seasons 1 and 3)

==== Season 1 ====
- April Grace as Jemma Moore, Steven's superior at the CIA
- Caroline Goodall as Kelly Frost, Steven's wife
- Bernhard Schütz as Hans Richter, an old-world spy who has risen to the highest ranks of the BfV
- Victoria Mayer as Ingrid Hollander, a German reporter
- Sabin Tambrea as Julian De Vos, a courier funneling information from "Thomas Shaw" to Claudia Gartner
- Sylvia Hoeks as Claudia Gartner, the courier between De Vos and Hollander
- Claudia Michelsen as Patricia Schwarz, Miller's cousin
- Antje Traue as Lana Vogel, aka "Joker", a freelance agent
- Zahra Ahmadi as Clare Itani, an American agent and DeJean's girlfriend
- Daniela Ziegler as Golda Friedman, a Mossad agent

==== Season 2 ====
- Thomas Kretschmann as Otto Ganz, a German alt-right extremist
- Emilia Schüle as Lena Ganz, Otto's daughter
- Natalia Wörner as Katerina Gerhardt, head of the far-right party Perspektive für Deutschland (PfD, “Perspective for Germany“)
- Heino Ferch as Joseph Emmerich, the #2 leader of the PfD
- Jannis Niewöhner as Armando, an undercover agent for the BfV
- Scott William Winters as Nick Fischer, a CIA agent
- Brandon Spink as Noah Kirsch, Robert Kirsch's son
- Matthew Leonhart as Tim Terkel, a Berlin Station analyst who helps April Lewis

==== Season 3 ====
- Katarina Čas as Sofia Vesik, a controversial Estonian tech CEO
- Mikhail Boutchine as Vassily Krik, a Russian oligarch
- Nikolai Kinski as Roman Platov, a Russian extremist working for Krik
- Adi Kvetner as Rodion Volkov, a Russian Spetsnaz soldier working for Krik
- Julian Kostov as Sergei Basarov, a Russian Spetsnaz sniper aligned with Volkov
- Ladi Emeruwa as Dove Adeyemi, an asset that April is cultivating
- Robin Weigert as Jamie Hudson, Valerie's friend from college
- Anja Antonowicz as Nina Bartek, Kirsch's neighbor
- James Cromwell as Gilbert Dorn, a retired CIA agent revealing old secrets via podcast
- Robbie Gee as Kayode Adeyemi, Dove's scientist father
- Dejan Čukić as Kolya Akulov, the head of Russian Intelligence SVR

== Episodes ==
=== Series overview ===
Season	Episodes	Originally released	
Season	Episodes	First released	Last released
1	10	October 16, 2016	December 18, 2016
2	9	October 15, 2017	December 3, 2017
3	10	December 2, 2018	February 17, 2019

=== Season 1 (2016) ===
No. overall	No. in season	Title	Directed by	Written by	Original release date	Prod. code
1	1	"Station to Station"	Michaël R. Roskam	Olen Steinhauer	October 16, 2016	101
Daniel Miller is sent to the CIA's Berlin Station with a covert mission to discover the identity of Thomas Shaw, a whistleblower leaking confidential intel to the German press.
2	2	"Lights Don't Run on Loyalty"	Michaël R. Roskam	Olen Steinhauer	October 23, 2016	102
Daniel investigates the murder of Shaw's courier while Station Chief Steven Frost and agents Valerie Edwards and Robert Kirsch clash in their own investigation of a suspected ISIL collaborator.
3	3	"Riverrun Dry"	Christoph Schrewe	Bradford Winters	October 30, 2016	103
Hector DeJean bugs Daniel's phone, and Valerie's surveillance reveals that one of her informants is lying to her. Investigators from the US arrive to lock down the station, leaving Steven and Robert concerned that evidence of their past indiscretions will be found.
4	4	"By Way of Deception"	Christoph Schrewe	Larry J. Cohen	November 6, 2016	104
Steven outmaneuvers his rival for the promotion to Deputy Director. Hector works against Daniel's risky mission.
5	5	"Unter Druck"	Giuseppe Capotondi	Amanda Kate Shuman	November 13, 2016	105
Daniel visits Steven to tell him that a new leak about the Chinese is going to be published by Berliner Zeitung that could affect Steven's position. Hector lets slip that he loves Clare. Krug is told to work with Daniel to take a Chinese political prisoner (Houjin Lin) to Poland, but the plane takes him to Beijing. At Krug's apartment, she seduces Daniel as a step in her recruitment of him. Valerie briefs Steven and Robert on a smuggling operation that gets young girls from Germany into Syria; two girls detained at the airport are interviewed by Valerie; Mossad shows interest in Robert who meets with Golda; initially, he rejects the overtures, but after disagreeing with Steven and Valerie over the logistics of the smuggling operation, he lean towards accepting; at the site of Daniel's mother's car bombing death, Krug tells him some 'home truths' about her; Daniel knows she is 'working' him and detaches; De Voss turns up outside Hector's apartment having been beaten.
6	6	"Just Decisions"	Giuseppe Capotondi	Story by : Olen Steinhauer & Amanda Kate Shuman; Teleplay by : Olen Steinhauer	November 20, 2016	106
At a secret meeting in a shielded BfV room between station management and the BfV, Valerie says that Ruth and Aleksandre Iosava are running an underground route from Germany to Syria for young girls to marry ISIL fighters; Cologne must approve the joint operation to thwart Ruth; Robert longs to be closer to his son and again meets with Golda, asking for help to get out of Berlin; at the operation 'go' briefing, Valerie, ever cynical, realizes it is about Steven wanting Jemma's desk; Clare tells Hector she is to be the 'ISIL bride' in the operation, so he confronts Valerie, who has excluded him from the op; Hector is not impressed that Daniel is on point and inserts himself into the operation at the food court, which goes bad when Ruth recognizes Clare; Ruth takes Clare, a shootout ensues and she escapes with Clare; Robert chases the van, but when he catches up with it, finds it empty; during the op, Robert tells Steven that Ruth's husband has been 'snatched'; Steven reflects upon his decisions with Sandra and she drops the title of the episode.
7	7	"Proof of Life"	John David Coles	Story by : Amanda Kate Shuman; Teleplay by : Adria Lang	November 27, 2016	107
Ruth demands Steven return her husband; she calls him and offers Clare for his return and their safe passage out; Langley tells Steven the Romanians took him, which is confirmed by video obtained by BfV; Krug infiltrates a Romanian club to find out from Vasile who ordered Iosava taken; Langley negotiates with the Romanians to get a live video feed with Iosava, but needs POTUS to approve; Hector enlists Daniel to find Clare and, using unapproved and unorthodox tactics, finds a clue in the van at the police impound yard that she is in Wedding; with Valerie's help and "Brown Bear", Hector and Daniel track down Clare to a warehouse, where she has attempted, unsuccessfully, to escape; Clare dies at the warehouse as Daniel and Hector try to save her; Hector kills Ruth; Golda asks Robert to give her the file on CIA op 'Antoinette'; Sandra sees him looking at a file; as Hector takes Clare's body away, Daniel tells Valerie that Ruth escaped; Hans tells Steven that Shaw has leaked the rendition of Iosava to the press, pointing the finger at Steven Frost; the newscaster reports that a warrant is issued for his arrest.
8	8	"False Negative"	John David Coles	Kyle Bradstreet	December 4, 2016	108
The debacle of Iosava continues to plague the Station. Daniel thinks he has identified Thomas Shaw, and tries to track down Steven Frost. Robert Kirsch is encouraged to distinguish himself as Acting Station Director, by undercutting Valerie Edwards.
9	9	"Thomas Shaw"	Joshua Marston	Bradford Winters	December 11, 2016	109
Daniel and Hector find their fates intertwined. Langley sends Clay Williams to investigate the Berlin Station. We see the Thomas Shaw origin story.
10	10	"Oratorio Berlin"	Joshua Marston	Olen Steinhauer	December 18, 2016	110
Robert Kirsch and Valerie Edwards connect evidence to cast light on Langley's role in the Iosava rendition, while Sandra and Kelly Frost try to help Steven. The aftermath of Thomas Shaw lingers over Daniel. Elsewhere, Hector tries a new approach to make amends for bad behavior.

=== Season 2 (2017) ===
No. overall	No. in season	Title	Directed by	Written by	Original release date	Prod. code
11	1	"Everything's Gonna Be Alt-Right"	Christoph Schrewe	Tony Basgallop & Bradford Winters	October 15, 2017	201
With Esther's help, Daniel fakes a murder as part of his cover as a black-market gun runner named Trevor Price. BB takes over as head of Berlin Station, and then she and Robert are called into a meeting with new ambassador Richard Hanes, who wants to be informed of all operations through Berlin Station. Although BB and Robert already launched Daniel's operation with Esther's help, they do not tell Hanes or CIA HQ in Langley about the operation. In addition, at Esther's request, Valerie and April plant a bug in Katerina Gerhardt's house. To prevent April from being discovered, Valerie has to distract PfD official Joseph Emmerich, who subsequently figures out her identity but seems more interested in flirting. In cleaning up his murder, "Trevor" makes contact with Lena Ganz, and (with Robert's help) he shows Lena samples of the weapons he can provide. She introduces him to her father Otto, who is looking to buy a large amount of weapons, but Otto refuses to talk with him unless he reveals his supplier and they visit him immediately. "Trevor", Otto, Lena and Armando (who is an undercover BfV agent posing as one of Otto's followers) end up at a villa in southern Spain, and the door is opened by a surprised Hector DeJean.
12	2	"Right Here, Right Now"	John David Coles	Tony Basgallop	October 15, 2017	202
This episode takes place entirely during one day at Hector's southern Spain hideout. Despite Hector's alarm at being found, Daniel manages to persuade Hector to re-adopt an old CIA cover of his as international arms dealer Andrew Chevalier and help Daniel close the deal with Otto. Otto pays "Andrew" a €100,000 down payment and places an order for 120 kg of Semtex and other explosives, but Lena then discovers that Armando is a BfV agent. When "Trevor" stops Otto from killing Armando, Armando takes Lena hostage and tries to flee, only to crash his car. Daniel and Hector find him, albeit seriously wounded, and Armando threatens to reveal Daniel's real identity if they let Otto capture him. Hector then kills Armando to prevent this, and "Andrew" then joins Otto, Lena and "Trevor" to return to Germany for the arms delivery in ten days.
13	3	"Right to the Heart"	John David Coles	Kiersten Van Horne	October 22, 2017	203
Valerie works to obtain intel on the Far Right while Robert's teenage son Noah arrives in Berlin and asks questions. Meanwhile, Frost agrees to the Ambassador's request to spy on Berlin.
14	4	"Do the Right Thing"	Bronwen Hughes	Larry J. Cohen	October 29, 2017	204
BB Yates' past is revealed while she juggles keeping Berlin Station's Far Right operation covert or revealing it to Ambassador Hanes; Daniel discovers a lack of trust between Otto Ganz and his daughter.
15	5	"Right of Way"	Bronwen Hughes	Lara Shapiro	November 5, 2017	205
The Station's sting operation to catch the Far Right in an arms deal goes horribly awry, with Lena Ganz escaping after her father is killed by police. Meanwhile, Robert and Frost make plans to investigate the money trail behind the PfDs.
16	6	"The Right Hook"	Sarah Pia Anderson	Nina Braddock & Bradford Winters	November 12, 2017	206
Robert and Frost travel to Norway to investigate the illegal money trail leading to PfD. Meanwhile, BB and Valerie devise a new plan involving a member of the Far Right, April makes an astounding discovery revealing an assassination plot, and Daniel is MIA for most of the episode, as he is bound and gagged.
17	7	"Right and Wrong"	Sarah Pia Anderson	Zach Craley	November 19, 2017	207
April weighs telling Robert about Hector's assassination plot; Daniel tries to arrange safe passage out of Berlin for Hector with help from Esther.
18	8	"The Righteous One"	Giuseppe Capotondi	Tony Basgallop	November 26, 2017	208
Hector is wanted by German authorities for the assassination of Katerina Gerhardt, but Berlin Station begins to discover there is more at play than a jaded ex-CIA officer.
19	9	"Winners Right the History Books"	Giuseppe Capotondi	Bradford Winters	December 3, 2017	209
A search for the truth behind Katerina Gerhardt's assassination and Nick Fischer's role in it. Meanwhile, a protest occurs outside the American Embassy as calls to turn Hector over escalate.

=== Season 3 (2018–19) ===
No. overall	No. in season	Title	Directed by	Written by	Original release date	Prod. code
20	1	"Aut Concilio Aut Ense"	Christoph Schrewe	Jason Horwitch	December 2, 2018	301
Daniel Miller searches for an American agent code-named "Diver" who he believes is responsible for his mother's death. Valerie Evans, now chief of station, sends Miller and Robert Kirsch to Tallinn, Estonia to meet with CIA officer Rafael Torres who believes Russia is planning to invade, and also to convince former prime minister Henrik Viiding to stop tearing down Russian war memorials. Viiding collapses and dies after meeting Kirsch and Miller, and Miller manages to retrieve a hair sample to prove he was poisoned. Miller is attacked, pursued and wounded by a ruthless Spetsnaz operative, but Kirsch manages to escape on a train with the sample.
21	2	"Fire Knows Nothing of Mercy"	Christoph Schrewe	Jill Blotevogel	December 2, 2018	302
22	3	"The Old Lie"	Bronwen Hughes	HSM Resnik	December 17, 2018	303
23	4	"If You Swear, You'll Catch No Fish"	Bronwen Hughes	Jennifer Kennedy	December 24, 2018	304
24	5	"The Dream of the Four Policemen"	Hagen Bogdanski	Sara Gran	January 6, 2019	305
25	6	"In Cold Hell"	Christoph Schrewe	Morenike Balogun	January 13, 2019	306
26	7	"The Eye Fears When It Is Done to See"	Tanya Hamilton	Zach Craley	January 20, 2019	307
27	8	"The Green Dacha"	Tanya Hamilton	Jennifer Kennedy	January 27, 2019	308
28	9	"End of War"	Marc Jobst	Jill Blotevogel	February 10, 2019	309
29	10	"Book of the Fallen"	Marc Jobst	Jason Horwitch	February 17, 2019	310

== Production ==
Epix announced a ten-episode straight-to-series order on May 21, 2015. Michaël Roskam executive produced the series and directed the first two episodes. Olen Steinhauer wrote and executive produced the series. Production started in November 2015.

Principal photography took place in Potsdam at Studio Babelsberg, which is co-producer of Berlin Station. The whole interior of the CIA Station, which includes a security entrance as well as the big windowless office space within, was built on stages at Babelsberg's studios. Other scenes were shot on locations in Potsdam and Berlin, Germany.

On February 7, 2018, it was announced that Jason Horwitch would be joining the series as showrunner and executive producer. He replaced Brad Winters who had served in those positions for the show's first two seasons. For the third season, production moved to Budapest, Hungary.

== Broadcast ==
A 10-episode first season of Berlin Station premiered on Epix on October 16, 2016. The series is exclusive to Netflix in Germany, Austria, Switzerland and Liechtenstein. It is broadcast free-to-air and on-demand in Australia on SBS TV. It also is available in Israel. The series has been licensed to more than 150 territories worldwide.

== Reception ==
Berlin Station has received generally positive reviews from critics. On Metacritic, the show holds a rating of 65 out of 100, based on 12 critics, indicating "generally favorable reviews". In a season 1 review for Variety, Maureen Ryan attests the series "an outstanding cast that takes its reasonably solid storytelling and raises it a few notches through sheer talent and charisma", praising especially Richard Jenkins, Michelle Forbes and Rhys Ifans. The New York Times' Mike Hale called season 3 a "well-made but not hugely original mix of spycraft, action and sexy office intrigue" and noticed that "Berlin Station is elevated by the surprising, and relatively unnoticed, quality of its core cast", mentioning particularly Leland Orser, whose "shifty, nervous energy still carries the show".
