= Finding Graceland =

- Directed by: David Winkler
- Screenplay by: Jason Horwitch
- Story by: Jason Horwitch; David Winkler
- Produced by: Cary Brokaw
- Starring: Harvey Keitel; Johnathon Schaech; Bridget Fonda; Gretchen Mol
- Cinematography: Elliot Davis
- Edited by: Luis Colina
- Music by: Stephen Endelman
- Production companies: Largo Entertainment; TCB Productions
- Distributed by: Avenue Pictures
- Release date: September 12, 1998 (Toronto International Film Festival)
- Running time: 97 minutes
- Country: United States
- Language: English

Finding Graceland is a 1998 American drama film starring Harvey Keitel, Johnathon Schaech, Bridget Fonda, and Gretchen Mol. The film features a character who claims to be an alive-and-well Elvis, years after staging his death.

== Premise ==
An eccentric drifter claiming to be Elvis Presley hitches a ride with a young man and they find themselves on an adventurous road trip to Memphis.

== Cast ==
- Harvey Keitel as Elvis
- Johnathon Schaech as Byron Gruman
- Bridget Fonda as Ashley
- Gretchen Mol as Beatrice Gruman
- John Aylward as Sheriff Haynes
- Susan Traylor as Maggie
- Tammy Isbell as Heather
- Peggy Gormley as Fran
- David Stewart as Purvis
- Gene Kirkwood as Gene
- Christine Brokaw as Marian Burrows
- Julia Brokaw as Lilli Burrows
- Trae Thomas as The Mechanic
