= Two Hats =

- Homeland episode
- Episode no.: Season 2 Episode 9
- Directed by: Dan Attias
- Written by: Alexander Cary
- Production code: 2WAH09
- Original air date: November 25, 2012
- Running time: 48 minutes

Guest appearances
- F. Murray Abraham as Dar Adal; Zuleikha Robinson as Roya Hammad; Mido Hamada as M.M ("munitions man"); Maury Sterling as Max; Daniella Pineda as Julia Diaz; Valerie Cruz as Major Joy Mendez; Rupert Friend as Peter Quinn

Episode chronology
← Previous "I'll Fly Away"	Next → "Broken Hearts"
- Homeland season 2

"Two Hats" is the ninth episode of the second season of the American television drama series Homeland, and the 21st episode overall. It originally aired on Showtime on November 25, 2012.

== Plot ==
Carrie (Claire Danes), Saul (Mandy Patinkin), Quinn (Rupert Friend), and Estes (David Harewood) discuss what to do now that Brody (Damian Lewis) has been missing for 12 hours. They decide to apprehend Roya Hammad (Zuleikha Robinson), but their plans change when Carrie gets a call from Brody. Brody desperately asks Carrie to get his family into protection immediately. Carrie opts to send Mike (Diego Klattenhoff) to pick up Brody's family, so as not to arouse suspicion. Mike brings Jessica (Morena Baccarin), Dana (Morgan Saylor), and Chris (Jackson Pace) to a CIA safe house and stays with them.

After looking into Quinn, Virgil (David Marciano) and Max (Maury Sterling) report their findings to Saul. They found anti-intrusion devices all over his apartment, and that his living quarters suggests he is ready to leave at any time. They also found a rifle cleaning kit and a photo of a woman with a baby. Saul tracks down the woman, a police officer in Philadelphia (Daniella Pineda), and talks to her, posing as an IRS employee. Saul confirms that she is the estranged mother of Quinn's child.

At a CIA debrief, Brody reports that he was taken to see Abu Nazir (Navid Negahban), who is now in the U.S. He goes on to state that Nazir made a veiled threat to Brody's family, and that Nazir is planning an attack on a homecoming event hosted by Vice President Walden (Jamey Sheridan) where 300 special ops soldiers are to be reunited with their families. Brody's assignment is to convince Walden to allow a lone journalist, Roya Hammad, to cover the event.

Dana, increasingly disillusioned by her father and the difficulties he has brought upon the family, expresses to Mike that sometimes she wishes her father never came back from the war. Mike tries to explain to her that everyone who was in the war comes back with a "wound," himself included.

Quinn meets with a man on an otherwise empty bus. Max, who was following Quinn, takes some photos of the meeting. When Saul sees the photos, he identifies Quinn's contact as Dar Adal (F. Murray Abraham), a man Saul knew from 18 years ago who was running classified operations out of Nairobi. Virgil notes that if Quinn is reporting to Dar Adal, his job function is far from the 'analyst' that he is supposed to be.

Late at night at the safehouse, Jessica sneaks into Mike's room and has sex with him. The next day, Brody calls his family to check in, talking to Chris and Jessica, but Dana refuses to speak with him.

On the day of the homecoming, the CIA has tracked Roya Hammad and her news team to a restaurant. Back at headquarters, Quinn leaves after being prompted by Estes. Saul asks Estes where Quinn is going. Estes explains that Quinn is acting as an "FBI liaison" today, and Saul asks why that task is assigned to an analyst. While Roya and her news team eat inside the restaurant, an SUV pulls up alongside Roya's news truck. Four of Abu Nazir's men emerge from the van, including the "munitions man" ("MM") who led the attack on the tailor's shop in Gettysburg (played by Mido Hamada), while one remains inside, obscured by tinted windows. They remove some camera batteries out of the back of the news van and replace them with similar-looking but much heavier devices from their van. When Carrie observes this, the go-ahead is given to move in, and the terrorists are captured successfully.

While this happens, Quinn drives a limousine to Brody's house to take him to the homecoming. While he waits, Quinn removes a silenced handgun from the glove compartment and readies to shoot Brody. But when Carrie confirms that the final man in the SUV was not Abu Nazir, Estes orders Quinn to "stand down" and that "we still need him."

== Production ==
The episode was written by executive producer Alexander Cary, and was directed by Dan Attias.

== Reception ==
=== Ratings ===
The original American broadcast received 2.02 million viewers, which increased in viewership from the previous episode.

=== Critical response ===
Michael Hogan of The Huffington Post had high praise, saying "In 'Two Hats,' arguably the best episode of the season so far, the writers piled intrigue on top of intrigue".

Conversely, Willa Paskin of Salon described it as "the season’s dullest episode, with the story and the characters feinting one way to go another, yet leaving us — for now — with just the feint."
