= Jason Horwitch =

American film and television writer

- Born: Los Angeles
- Education: University of California, Berkeley
- Occupations: Film writer, Television writer, Producer

Jason Horwitch is an American film and television writer. He is the recipient of the Writers Guild of America’s Paul Selvin Award for FX’s The Pentagon Papers. Horwitch created AMC’s conspiracy thriller television series Rubicon and was a writer/producer on the TV series Southland. He also served as Co-EP on Season 6 of Netflix's House of Cards and EP / showrunner on Season 3 of Epix's Berlin Station. Horwitch got his start on the TV series Medical Investigation, wrote the made-for-television film Joe and Max, and co-wrote the independent feature Finding Graceland.

Horwitch is the co-showrunner and executive producer of the 2022 series Echo 3 on Apple TV+. He is also consulting producer on The Morning Show on Apple TV + and Executive Producer of Kevin Hart's Fight Night on Peacock.
