= Medical Investigation =

- Genre: Medical drama
- Created by: Jason Horwitch
- Starring: Neal McDonough; Kelli Williams; Christopher Gorham; Anna Belknap; Troy Winbush
- Composer: Danny Lux
- Country of origin: United States
- Original language: English
- No. of seasons: 1
- No. of episodes: 20

Production
- Executive producers: Bob Cooper; Scott Vila; Steven Long Mitchell; Craig W. Van Sickle; Laurence Andries; Michelle Ashford
- Producers: David Graziano; Mark M. Dodson; Erin Maher; Kay Reindl; Jill Danton
- Running time: 60 minutes
- Production companies: Landscape Television; NBC Universal Television Studio; Paramount Network Television

Original release
- Network: NBC
- Release: September 9, 2004 – March 25, 2005

Related
- Third Watch; ER

Medical Investigation is an American medical drama television series that began September 9, 2004, on NBC. It ran for 20 one-hour episodes before its cancellation on March 25, 2005. The series was co-produced by Paramount Network Television and NBC Universal Television Studio.

The series featured the cases of an elite team of medical experts of the National Institutes of Health (NIH) who investigate unusual public health crises, such as sudden outbreaks of serious and mysterious diseases. In actuality, medical investigative duties in the United States are normally the responsibility of the Centers for Disease Control and Prevention (CDC) and local health departments, while the NIH is primarily a disease-research and -theory organization.

== Cast ==
- Neal McDonough plays Dr. Stephen Connor; the leader of the team whose medical career has separated him from his family. Connor was previously a captain in the US Army, and fought in the Gulf War.
- Kelli Williams plays Dr. Natalie Durant; an expert in pathology and epidemiology, who often questions Connor, although serving as the team's second-in-command.
- Christopher Gorham plays Dr. Miles McCabe; the newest and youngest member of the team; frequently tries to prove his worth.
- Anna Belknap plays Eva Rossi; the team's media liaison who prevents the team's investigations from causing public panic.
- Troy Winbush plays Frank Powell; a highly skilled medical investigator who has been friends with Connor for sometime. Previously served in the US Navy.

== Episodes ==
No.	Title	Directed by	Written by	Original release date	US viewers (millions)
1	"Pilot" "You're Not Alone"	Marc Buckland	Story by : Jason Horwitch; Teleplay by : Jason Horwitch & Michelle Ashford	September 9, 2004	11.80
When people in New York City start turning the color blue, the NIH team is called upon to help cure this outbreak. When searching for the cause, a diner holds an important clue - but what is the ingredient that they all had in common? Only 3 weeks on the job, McCabe is sent to investigate a baby whose parents are thought to have been abusing her. A well-known disease is the answer to the question - brittle bone disease. Guest starring: Michael Nouri
2	"In Bloom"	Marc Buckland	Jason Horwitch	September 10, 2004	10.80
A group of four teenage girls are suspected of having an STD when they are hospitalized for seizures. However, when that's not the case, the NIH team must uncover the true cause of the seizures, and a pair of pants holds a clue.
3	"Coming Home"	Rick Wallace	Mark Israel	September 17, 2004	8.10
When four soldiers return from Iraq and fall dangerously ill, the natural assumption is exposure to a chemical or biological agent. However, when a group of nursing home residents die of the same symptoms, the NIH team is left baffled.
4	"Escape"	Marc Buckland	Daniel Arkin	September 24, 2004	8.30
When the guests at a Bahama resort start falling ill, the NIH team is called in by the local government. When a child falls ill with the same symptoms, the team finds the common link.
5	"Progeny"	Rick Wallace	Barry M. Schkolnick	October 1, 2004	10.10
After years of watching young children fall prey to a crippling muscular ailment, a small community summons the NIH team to hopefully find a cure. At first, Connor suspects a local chemical plant as being the cause of this devastating illness. However, a common link is discovered, and the DNA of the children holds an important clue. Guest starring: Gregory Itzin and Andrea Thompson
6	"Team"	Guy Ferland	Laurence Andries	October 15, 2004	9.20
When the jocks of a Midwestern College start falling prey to a crippling disease, the NIH team is summoned to investigate. At first, the suspected agent is multiple sclerosis. However, when the coach, as well as some sorority pledges fall ill with similar symptoms, the NIH team is baffled. As it turns out, the girls are not suffering from the same illness. The common links are discovered, and for the jocks, an athletic banquet holds the answer, and for the pledges, a tube of foreign lipstick.
7	"Alienation"	Mike Fresco	Ayanna Floyd	October 29, 2004	9.20
The Team flies to Philadelphia to investigate an outbreak of a mysterious ailment amongst random people. The team identifies it to be anthrax and it's a race against time to identify the source. Guest starring: Glenn Morshower
8	"Mutation"	Marc Buckland	David Graziano	November 5, 2004	9.10
The team flies to a small Virginia town to figure out why people are dying from a deadly strain of the flu.
9	"Little Girl"	Paul Holahan	Steven Long Mitchell & Craig Van Sickle	November 12, 2004	N/A
After the victims of a car accident are diagnosed with a deadly disease, a small Maryland town requests the assistance of the NIH team. A little girl survives the crash, which makes her the only living patient, but she requires an urgent bone marrow transplant. With her father dead and mother missing, the team must find a donor for her with time running out, but also find the source of the non-contagious disease.
10	"Price of Pleasure"	Norberto Barba	Juan Carlos Coto	November 19, 2004	N/A
When adult film stars in Los Angeles start falling prey to a devastating disease, the health department summons the NIH team. At first, being as they are adult film stars, Connor suspects an STD. However, when a housewife falls prey to the same illness, a new link needs to be found and the answer might lie with a plastic surgeon, water and some fish. Guest starring: Michael Ironside and Paul Schulze
11	"The Unclean"	Elodie Keenee	Mark M. Dodson	December 3, 2004	10.30
A hospital tries to cover up an outbreak of a vicious flesh-eating bacteria and a whistle-blower calls in the NIH. The team exhausts the possibilities and must accept that they have an "angel of death" deliberately infecting patients.
12	"Spiked"	Elodie Keenee	Peter Egan	January 7, 2005	9.70
A surfer and a volleyball player from a seaside town catch a mysterious disease. Dr. Connor and his staff investigate and find a nearby seal colony is being blamed. Connor must find the source of the disease before the colony is killed.
13	"Tribe"	Marc Buckland	Jason Horwitch & David Graziano	January 14, 2005	9.30
A family falls into a mysterious disease. Connor finds out another family was infected with the disease. A clue helps them to discover they were infected with smallpox. The team must find out whether the smallpox is human made or natural.
14	"Ice Station"	Jeffrey Reiner	Mark M. Dodson & Jeff Braunstein	January 28, 2005	N/A
The team is trapped in a snowstorm in the arctic while trying to figure what is causing pneumonia in patients that also causes psychosis. To make matters worse, one of their own goes down with the same illness.
15	"Mousetrap"	Norberto Barba	Barry M. Schkolnick, Steven Long Mitchell & Craig Van Sickle	February 4, 2005	8.70
The team travels to Baltimore to help stop an outbreak of the plague, a disease that wiped out much of Europe in the middle ages. But they uncover a string of dirty cops, who were trying to cover up a murder, in the process. Guest starring: Michael Cudlitz
16	"Survivor"	Craig Zisk	Ayanna Floyd & Jeff Braunstein	February 11, 2005	7.80
Split cases find Connor, Durant, and Powell in New York City trying to cure victims who are presenting paralysis as a result of the September 11 Terrorist Attacks, and Miles and Eva down south trying to figure out what is causing the pregnant wives of military men to miscarry.
17	"Half Life"	Roxann Dawson	David Ehrman	February 18, 2005	N/A
The NIH team teams up with the officers of the 55th Precinct in New York City to try to figure out what is the source of an outbreak of Marburg, a deadly disease with no known cure. They also try to locate patient zero, a murder suspect on the run, who is helping to spread the disease throughout New York City. This episode concludes a crossover with Third Watch that begins on "In the Family Way". Molly Price, Anthony Ruivivar and Yvonne Jung guest star as their respective Third Watch characters - Faith Yokas, Carlos Nieto and Holly Levine.
18	"The Black Book"	Elodie Keenee	Michael B. Silver	February 25, 2005	8.30
Connor suspects terrorism when two congressmen and an officer fall prey to an unknown disease. However, when the leader of a prostitution ring becomes ill with the same symptoms, an unknown STD becomes the suspected agent. Now it is a race against the clock, and their pesky boss, Dr. Ewing, to find a call girl who may be the source of this deadly outbreak.
19	"Mission La Roca, Part One"	Karen Gaviola	Steven Long Mitchell & Craig Van Sickle	March 18, 2005	8.50
Connor and Powell must travel to a small Mexican town after an earthquake strikes, trapping Natalie, Eva, and Miles. Only when they go after Miles, who was trapped in the church Mission La Roca, they are captured by insurgents.
20	"Mission La Roca, Part Two"	Paul Holahan	Mark M. Dodson, David Ehrman, Steven Long Mitchell & Craig Van Sickle	March 25, 2005	8.00
The team figures out that they are dealing with bacterial meningitis, and the only thing that makes their day worse is a corrupt politician who steals the medicine and holds them to ransom. Elsewhere, the people at Mission La Roca (Miles, Connor, Powell, Nestor, Juan, Kris, and Baracas) make it out before the church collapses, and take the sick ones off to the hospital for treatment.

== Rebroadcasts ==
The USA Network began airing reruns on January 6, 2005. High-definition reruns of the show were broadcast on the Universal HD channel. In January 2007, the series began airing on NBC Universal's mystery and crime-themed cable channel, Sleuth.
