= Falling Water (TV series) =

American supernatural drama television series

- Genre: Drama; Supernatural
- Created by: Henry Bromell; Blake Masters
- Starring: David Ajala; Lizzie Brocheré; Will Yun Lee; Kai Lennox; Anna Wood; Zak Orth
- Composers: Nick Urata; The Newton Brothers
- Country of origin: United States
- Original language: English
- No. of seasons: 2
- No. of episodes: 20

Production
- Executive producers: Juan Carlos Fresnadillo; Gale Anne Hurd; Blake Masters; Henry Bromell
- Cinematography: Shelly Johnson
- Camera setup: Single-camera
- Production companies: Gangtackle Productions; Valhalla Entertainment; Universal Cable Productions

Original release
- Network: USA Network
- Release: September 21, 2016 – March 10, 2018

Falling Water is an American supernatural drama television series. A commercial-free advance preview of the pilot aired on September 21, 2016, ahead of its October 13, 2016 premiere. On April 3, 2017, USA Network renewed the series for a second season, with Rémi Aubuchon replacing Blake Masters as the showrunner. On May 18, 2018, USA announced they had cancelled the series.

The pilot was written and co-created by Masters and Henry Bromell before Bromell died in 2013. In honor to his work, Bromell is still listed as a co-creator and receives a producer credit.

== Plot ==
Three strangers realize they are dreaming parts of the same dream. As they delve deeper into the meaning behind their connection to each other, they realize that the implications are much larger than their personal fates, and the future of the world lies in their hands.

== Cast and characters ==
=== Main ===
- David Ajala as Burton, head of The Firm's in-house security
- Lizzie Brocheré as Tess, a trend spotter
- Will Yun Lee as Taka, an NYPD detective
- Kai Lennox as Woody Hammond, private equity specialist at The Firm
- Anna Wood as Olivia Watson aka The Woman in Red (season 1; "special guest star" in season 2)
- Zak Orth as Bill Boerg, founder and CEO of Boerg Industries
- Sepideh Moafi as Alexis Simms, Taka's new partner in homicide (season 2)

=== Recurring ===
- Jodi Long as Kumiko, Taka's catatonic mother
- Brooke Bloom (season 1) and Brittany Allen (season 2) as Sabine, Tess' older sister
- Melanie Nicholls-King as Ann Marie Bowen, a woman Taka comes across who may be in a cult (season 1)
- Neal Huff as Nicholas Hull, the CEO of The Firm, the company Burton works for
- Mary McCormack as Taylor Bennett, a mysterious but powerful woman who hires Woody Hammond to manipulate other people's dreams (season 2)

== Production ==
The series is filmed in Toronto, Ontario; primarily at Cinespace Film Studios' Kipling Avenue facility.

== Episodes ==
=== Season 1 (2016) ===
No. overall	No. in season	Title	Directed by	Written by	Original release date	US viewers (millions)
1	1	"Don't Tell Bill"	Juan Carlos Fresnadillo	Henry Bromell & Blake Masters	September 21, 2016 (Note: The pilot episode of Falling Water aired as a "special preview" three weeks before its formal television premiere on October 13, 2016.)	0.467
2	2	"Calling the Vasty Deep"	Jack Bender	Blake Masters	October 20, 2016	0.507
3	3	"Monsters, Most Familiar"	Jack Bender	A. M. Homes	October 27, 2016	0.527
4	4	"Castles Made of Sand"	Nick Gomez	Blake Masters & Meghan Kennedy	November 3, 2016	0.348
5	5	"Ambergris"	Nick Gomez	Blake Masters & Meghan Kennedy	November 10, 2016	0.469
6	6	"The Swirl"	Guy Ferland	Eoghan Mahony	November 17, 2016	0.418
7	7	"Three Half Blind Mice"	Guy Ferland	A. M. Homes	December 1, 2016	0.511
8	8	"The Well"	Ellen Kuras	Meghan Kennedy	December 8, 2016	0.444
9	9	"No Task for the Timid"	Ellen Kuras	Eoghan Mahony	December 15, 2016	0.444
10	10	"Circular Time"	Blake Masters	Blake Masters	December 22, 2016	0.470

=== Season 2 (2018) ===
No. overall	No. in season	Title	Directed by	Written by	Original release date	US viewers (millions)
11	1	"Shadowman"	Tim Andrew	Remi Aubuchon	January 6, 2018	0.279
12	2	"Watchers"	Tim Andrew	David Weddle & Bradley Thompson	January 13, 2018	0.413
13	3	"Safehouse"	Christoph Schrewe	Allison Moore	January 20, 2018	0.346
14	4	"Dröm"	Christoph Schrewe	Lana Cho	January 27, 2018	0.424
15	5	"Promotion"	Eva Sorhaug	Mac Marshall	February 3, 2018	0.433
16	6	"Mothers, Fathers, Daughters, Sons"	Eva Sorhaug	Albert Torres	February 10, 2018	0.255
17	7	"Love Is a Dreamer"	Sarah Harding	Linda McGibney	February 17, 2018	0.469
18	8	"Nothing Personal"	Michael Goi	Albert Torres & Katie Altman	February 24, 2018	0.197
19	9	"Risk Assessment"	Sarah Harding	Allison Moore	March 3, 2018	0.342
20	10	"The Art of the Deal"	Michael Goi	David Weddle & Bradley Thompson	March 10, 2018	0.335

== Reception ==
=== Critical response ===
Falling Water has received mixed reviews from critics. The review aggregator website Rotten Tomatoes reported a 28% approval rating, with an average rating of 5.21/10 based on 18 reviews. The website's consensus states, "Falling Water attempts complexity and intrigue but churns out an unimaginative concept lacking a redeemable payoff." Metacritic, which uses a weighted average, assigned a score of 50 out of 100 based on 14 reviews, indicating "Mixed or average reviews".

== Awards and nominations ==
Year	Award	Category	Nominee	Result	Ref
2017	Saturn Awards	Best Science Fiction Television Series	Falling Water	Nominated	
