= Broken Hearts (Homeland) =

- Homeland episode
- Episode no.: Season 2 Episode 10
- Directed by: Guy Ferland
- Written by: Henry Bromell
- Production code: 2WAH10
- Original air date: December 2, 2012
- Running time: 48 minutes

Guest appearances
- F. Murray Abraham as Dar Adal; Valerie Cruz as Major Joy Mendez; Hrach Titizian as Danny Galvez; Timothée Chalamet as Finn Walden; David Bishins as Robert Valence; Rupert Friend as Peter Quinn

Episode chronology
← Previous "Two Hats"	Next → "In Memoriam"
- Homeland season 2

"Broken Hearts" is the tenth episode of the second season of the American television drama series Homeland, and the 22nd episode overall. It originally aired on Showtime on December 2, 2012.

== Plot ==
Saul (Mandy Patinkin) talks with Dar Adal (F. Murray Abraham) at a local diner. Adal confirms that Peter Quinn (Rupert Friend) is one of his men on loan to Estes, but for what purpose, he claims not to know. Later, at Langley, Saul confronts Estes (David Harewood) regarding why Quinn is involved in the operation. Estes becomes furious when Saul implies that Quinn was brought in to kill Brody to cover up Estes' complicity in the drone strike that killed Abu Nazir's (Navid Negahban) son Issa. Quinn approaches them, reporting that Carrie (Claire Danes) was in a car accident and is now missing. Saul heads to the accident scene. While he is gone, Estes tells Quinn "he knows."

At the safehouse, Jessica (Morena Baccarin) and Mike (Diego Klattenhoff) reminisce about sleeping together the previous night. They begin kissing, but stop when they hear Brody (Damian Lewis) at the door. Brody receives a call from Nazir, who has taken Carrie hostage in an abandoned mill. He rebukes Brody for betraying him and threatens to kill Carrie unless Brody carries out a task for him. He orders Brody to enter Vice President Walden's (Jamey Sheridan) home office at the Naval Observatory and retrieve a serial number that corresponds to Walden's pacemaker. He explains that he will be able to use the serial number to manipulate the pacemaker wirelessly.

While Carrie and Nazir get into a heated debate of ethics, Brody goes to the Naval Observatory to find that Walden is in a meeting with the Israeli ambassador to the United States. He sneaks into Walden's office and sends the serial number by text message to Abu Nazir, only after confirming that Carrie has been set free. Nazir sends the serial number to an associate who is sitting at a computer. Walden, finished with his meeting, enters his office and finds Brody. Brody tells Walden that he is withdrawing as a candidate for vice president in order to take care of his family; Walden bristles at the idea. Nazir's associate gains access to Walden's pacemaker and accelerates his heartbeat, inducing a heart attack. Brody sees Walden struggling and reveals his true motivations for withdrawing: his desire to be "clean" again and his disagreement with everything Walden stands for. Walden tries to call for help, but Brody pushes the desk phone out of Walden's reach. As Walden succumbs, Brody tells him, "You still don't get it, do you? I'm killing you." After Walden is dead, Brody finally calls for help.

Finn (Timothée Chalamet) visits Dana (Morgan Saylor), telling her that he is haunted every day by the fact that he killed someone, and that Dana is the only one to whom he can talk about it. He floats the idea of renewing their relationship, but Dana declines.

Carrie, having been set free, stops a truck driver on an unknown road and grabs the driver's cell phone to call Saul, telling him of her location. Langley forces move in en masse, but as Saul is leaving the CIA building, he is detained by two men. He tells the officers to call Estes to get him out, but they inform him that Estes is already aware. Not content to wait for backup, Carrie returns to the abandoned mill to look for Nazir. The episode ends with Carrie opening the door where she believes Nazir is hiding.

== Production ==
The episode was written by executive producer Henry Bromell, and was directed by Guy Ferland.

At the time of the broadcast, the episode's hacked pacemaker induced heart attack method of killing Vice President Walden was derided as unrealistic, but it was later discovered to be based on a real security concern regarding former Vice President Dick Cheney's pacemaker, which was implanted into the then vice president in 2007. Like in the plot of "Broken Hearts", a heart attack could be remotely induced by someone possibly hacking into Cheney's pacemaker:

"I found [the depiction] credible because I knew from the experience that we had assessing the need for my own device that it was an accurate portrayal of what was possible," Cheney said of the plot.

== Reception ==
=== Ratings ===
The original American broadcast received 2.20 million viewers, which increased in viewership and became the highest-rated episode up to that point.

=== Critical response ===
Willa Paskin of Salon described the episode as unrealistic and called many of the scenes unnecessary.

Michael Hogan of The Huffington Post said that "I just finished watching the new episode of "Homeland" and boy, are my suspension-of-disbelief muscles tired."

Scott Collura of IGN rated "Broken Hearts" an 8.5 out of 10, also stressing the unrealistic plot points in the episode.
