= I'll Fly Away (Homeland) =

- Homeland episode
- Episode no.: Season 2 Episode 8
- Directed by: Michael Cuesta
- Story by: Howard Gordon; Chip Johannessen
- Teleplay by: Chip Johannessen
- Production code: 2WAH08
- Original air date: November 18, 2012
- Running time: 52 minutes

Guest appearances
- Mido Hamada as M.M.; Zuleikha Robinson as Roya Hammad; Maury Sterling as Max; Jeanette Dilone as Inez; Rupert Friend as Peter Quinn

Episode chronology
← Previous "The Clearing"	Next → "Two Hats"
- Homeland season 2

"I'll Fly Away" is the eighth episode of the second season of the American television drama series Homeland, and the 20th episode overall. It originally aired on Showtime on November 18, 2012.

== Plot ==
With Dana (Morgan Saylor) still not having returned home, Brody (Damian Lewis) and Jessica (Morena Baccarin) get into an argument over what to do. Brody is adamant that reporting the accident would have compromised his mission with the CIA. Jessica tells him to cut ties with the CIA, but Brody screams back that he cannot do so. They are interrupted by a phone call from Mike (Diego Klattenhoff), advising that Dana went to his place, so Jessica leaves with Chris (Jackson Pace) to get her. Carrie (Claire Danes) is aware that Brody is late for a meeting with Roya (Zuleikha Robinson) and enters his home, finding Brody nearly catatonic and sitting on the floor in the hallway. Carrie sees that Brody is succumbing to the pressure, and tells him the ordeal is "almost over" and manages to get him to go to the meeting. However, when he sees Roya, Brody expresses his frustration at being constantly left in the dark at what is going on, finally telling Roya "I'm through" and walking away. In an attempt to salvage the operation, Carrie tracks down Brody and takes him to a safe room in a motel.

After a nap at Mike's house, Dana calls Jessica, asking if she can spend the night there. During the conversation, Dana also reveals that it was Carrie who intervened to stop her and Brody from reporting the hit-and-run accident to the police.

In the motel room, Brody seems somewhat relieved that he has burned all his bridges with Abu Nazir, the CIA, and his family. He is resigned to the fact that he will be imprisoned, but that, at least, he will be able to finally stop lying to everybody. Carrie tells Brody how, if he stays with the mission and completes it, he will be a "real hero," and that all the bad things he had done so far would not matter, as it would all have led to bringing down Abu Nazir. They then have sex, while Saul (Mandy Patinkin) and Quinn (Rupert Friend), who can hear everything through their surveillance, uncomfortably listen in. Quinn wants to abort, claiming that Carrie's love for Brody is hopelessly clouding her judgment. But, Saul remains steadfast that Carrie is merely taking care of her asset and getting him back on board. Quinn calls off the team sent to capture Brody and Carrie.

The next day, Brody calls Roya, saying that he is under a lot of pressure and may have said some things he should not have, but that he wants back in. Later on, Roya takes Brody to a remote location in the woods, while being tailed by some CIA vehicles, including Carrie, Virgil (David Marciano), and Max (Maury Sterling) in one of the vehicles. Waiting for Roya and Brody is the man (Mido Hamada) who led the attack on the tailor's shop in Gettysburg. Carrie is immediately concerned for Brody's life when she recognizes the man, and proposes capturing the three conspirators right then and there. But, Quinn insists on letting the operation continue. Brody is forcibly taken to a clearing in the forest. Carrie follows on foot, reporting what is happening to Saul and Quinn. A helicopter descends and picks up Brody.

Dana has Mike give her a ride to the house of Inez (Jeanette Dilone), the daughter of the woman killed in the hit-and-run accident. Inez recognizes her from the hospital and quickly surmises that Dana was responsible for killing her mother. Dana repeatedly apologizes and says she is trying to take responsibility, but is only met with hostility from Inez. When Dana mentions possibly going to the police, Inez strongly objects, indicating that she will receive a pay-off in return for keeping quiet about the accident. Mike brings Dana back home that night. Dana cries in her mother's arms, as she admits that she feels like a murderer.

Brody, having been taken to an unknown location, finds himself face to face with a now Western-dressed, clean-shaven Abu Nazir (Navid Negahban) as the episode ends.

== Production ==
The episode's teleplay was written by executive producer Chip Johannessen, with story credit going to Johannessen and executive producer Howard Gordon. It was directed by executive producer Michael Cuesta.

== Reception ==
=== Ratings ===
The original American broadcast received 1.87 million viewers, which decreased in viewership from the previous episode.

=== Critical response ===
Emily VanDerWerff of The A.V. Club gave the episode an "A−" grade, pointing out the strong development of the Brody character as it has become the core of the series' second season.

Scott Collura of IGN rated the episode a 9 out of 10, praising the performance of Morgan Saylor.
