= Blake Masters (screenwriter) =

American screenwriter, director, producer

- Education: Stanford University (BA)
- Occupations: Screenwriter, director, producer
- Children: 2
- Writing career
- Period: 2006–present
- Notable works: Brotherhood; Law & Order: LA; Crossbones; 2 Guns

Blake Masters is an American writer, director, and producer of films and television series. Masters is best known as the creator of the Showtime television series Brotherhood, developer of the NBC television series Law & Order: LA, and co-executive producer and writer of the NBC television series Crossbones. Masters also wrote the screenplay for the film 2 Guns.

== Early life ==
Masters grew up in New England. Masters graduated from Stanford University with a degree in economics.

== Career ==
Before creating Brotherhood, Masters made a living selling screenplays to studios. However, he never was able to get an original project produced. Brotherhood was conceived as a feature film; after some input, Masters decided to adapt it into a television series. He wrote the 2013 film 2 Guns, directed by Baltasar Kormákur and starring Denzel Washington and Mark Wahlberg.

Masters and Henry Bromell created the USA Network series Falling Water. In 2023, it was announced that writer and executive producer Masters was at the helm of a new series entitled Miraculous, starring Anthony Anderson as a car salesman who can perform miracles.

=== Writers Guild of America election ===
In July 2023, during the Writers Guild of America strike, Masters announced his candidacy for the board of the Writers Guild of America West. He has been endorsed by writers including Jeff Greenstein, Dan O'Keefe, Richard E. Robbins, Scott Reynolds, and Daniel Waters. His platform is focused on drawing attention to often-ignored aspects of the WGA going into the future: expanding training programs for all levels of writers, restoring back-end participation, and focusing on long-term strategic planning to stay ahead in a rapidly changing business.

=== Politics ===
In a humorous video in October 2022, Masters endorsed Democratic incumbent Mark Kelly against the Republican nominee who shares his name and alma mater in the 2022 United States Senate election in Arizona.

== Filmography ==
=== Television ===
- Heels (2023; writer / consulting producer)
- Sneaky Pete (2019; writer / showrunner / executive producer)
- Falling Water (2016; creator / writer / director / executive producer)
- Survivor's Remorse (2015; writer / consulting producer)
- Crossbones (2014; writer / co-executive producer)
- Law & Order: LA (2010-2011; developer / executive producer)
- Rubicon (2010; writer / consulting producer)
- Brotherhood (2006-2008; creator / writer / director)

=== Film ===
- 2 Guns (2013; screenplay by)
- Convenience (1997 short; writer / director / executive producer)
- The Audition (1995 short; writer / director / executive producer)
