= Rubicon (TV series) =

American conspiracy thriller television series

- Genre: Drama; Conspiracy thriller
- Created by: Jason Horwitch
- Starring: James Badge Dale; Jessie Collins; Lauren Hodges; Dallas Roberts; Christopher Evan Welch; Arliss Howard; Miranda Richardson
- Country of origin: United States
- Original language: English
- No. of seasons: 1
- No. of episodes: 13

Production
- Executive producers: Jason Horwitch; Henry Bromell; Joshua D. Maurer
- Producers: Leslie Jacobowitz; Kerry Orent
- Production location: New York
- Running time: 45 minutes
- Production companies: HBTV; City Entertainment; Warner Horizon Television

Original release
- Network: AMC
- Release: June 13 – October 17, 2010

Rubicon is an American conspiracy thriller television series created by Jason Horwitch and produced by Henry Bromell that was broadcast on the AMC television network in 2010. The series centers on an intelligence analyst working for the American Policy Institute (API) in New York City. The series stars James Badge Dale, Jessie Collins, Lauren Hodges, Miranda Richardson, Dallas Roberts, Christopher Evan Welch, Arliss Howard, and Michael Cristofer.

The original focus of the series was influenced by conspiracy films of the 1970s such as Three Days of the Condor and The Parallax View, in which an innocent character is caught up in, and slowly unravels, a major conspiracy. Creative differences with the network, however, caused Horwitch to leave the series, after which Bromell focused the episodes more on the workers at API, which was changed from a think tank to a private intelligence agency.

Rubicon debuted on AMC on August 1, 2010, as a two-hour, two episode block. With two million viewers, the August 1 premiere set a record as the most watched debut of an AMC original series at that time. However, due to low viewing figures, AMC canceled Rubicon on November 11, 2010, stating that the show had been "an opportunity to tell a rich and compelling story, and we're proud of the series. This was not an easy decision, but we are grateful to have had the opportunity to work with such a phenomenally talented and dedicated team."

== Production ==
=== Concept ===
The show's title references Caesar's 49 BC crossing of the Rubicon in northeastern Italy, an act of war against the Roman Republic. A press release by Bromell noted that the Roman senators "were always afraid that the Roman army would someday take over, which is exactly what happened. And that's when the republic ended and the empire—which is a dictatorship—began." The river's history was also mentioned in episode 12, when Kale Ingram compares Katherine Rhumor's late husband to Cato the Younger, whose suicide permitted his family to "make peace with Caesar and a life of their own".

The narrative of the show involves the main protagonist, an intelligence analyst, during his investigation into the mysterious death of his mentor, which is later revealed to be an act of a larger conspiracy committed by a secret society of war profiteers in corporate America, whose members may include his employer.

Creator Jason Horwitch conceived the show based on conspiracy films of the 1970s such as All the President's Men, Three Days of the Condor, and The Parallax View inspired by their slow-paced action and complex stories. After writing and producing the pilot, Horwitch left the show due to "creative disagreements" with the network. Producer Henry Bromell then took over the role as showrunner, making numerous changes including shifting the workplace from a civilian think tank similar to RAND to an intelligence consulting firm similar to STRATFOR. With Horwitch off-board, further production began on March 29, 2010, in New York City. Subsequent episodes shifted much of the series's focus to workplace dynamics instead of the original conspiracy.

== Cast and characters ==
=== Main cast ===
- James Badge Dale as Will Travers: a brilliant man with an aptitude for pattern recognition, he is the leader of a team of analysts at a New York City international intelligence think tank, the American Policy Institute. Will's wife and daughter were killed during the September 11, 2001, attacks. Will was supposed to meet his wife and daughter at the World Trade Center on that date, but was delayed long enough to miss the attack. As a result of the tragedy, he is distracted and distant from his co-workers. He detects a pattern in the crossword puzzles of several U.S. newspapers, all published the same day, and reports his discovery to his father-in-law, mentor, and protector at the agency, David Hadas. Hadas assures Will that the pattern is likely of no value, and instead puts himself in harm's way by passing Will's discovery on to a supervisor at API. After Hadas is killed in a suspicious commuter train collision, the agency offers Hadas' job to Will. Will begins unraveling an apparent conspiracy with threatening U.S. national security implications, all based on the "go code" discovered in the crossword puzzles.
- Jessica Collins as Margaret "Maggie" Young: Will's assistant. She appears to be romantically interested in Will, but she has been unable to break through his emotional barriers. She has a daughter named Sophie, and she is estranged from her husband. Maggie tries to help Will, but also works for Kale, delivering information about Will and his team. Eventually, Kale recognizes that her feelings for Will could compromise the information she provides, and he tells Will that she has been spying on him. Will, who had become attracted to her, confronts Maggie and refuses to work with her further, though Kale assures Maggie she will remain at API.
- Lauren Hodges as Tanya MacGaffin: the newest member of Will's analysis team. She is the least experienced and consequently the most insecure, but very intelligent and also the most ambitious. She appears to have a substance abuse problem. She regularly comes to work hungover and keeps miniature bottles of vodka in her desk. Kale is made aware of her possible alcoholism by Maggie, and he passes that information to Will. Her problem comes to the attention of Spangler when she fails a bi-weekly urine test. Instead of being fired, Spangler assures her that the agency "takes care of its own" and offers her the help of a special drug rehab facility created for "the intelligence community".
- Dallas Roberts as Miles Fiedler: member of Will's analysis team. An MIT graduate with a genius-level IQ, he is the most distracted and anxious member of the team. His behavior is compounded by his recent estrangement and separation from his wife and children, a fact he conceals from his co-workers, but which affects the quality of his work. Miles respects Will as a boss, and clashes frequently with Grant.
- Christopher Evan Welch as Grant Test: the eldest member of Will's team. Impatient, irritable, and self-important, he resents being passed over as team leader in favor of Will. He clashes frequently with Miles and Tanya, using his seniority to bully the two on occasion. Married with two children, Grant's marriage is heavily strained by the demands of his job and the aggressive personality of his ambitious wife.
- Arliss Howard as Kale Ingram: Will's enigmatic supervisor at API. Ingram is a veteran of U.S. Army Intelligence and has many friends in special operations. At API, he has tasked Maggie to spy on Will and the rest of his team. He is in regular contact with API's director, Truxton Spangler. Although the series implies that Ingram is involved in the conspiracy, he helps Will by providing him with leads in his investigation and by warning him that his home and office are bugged. He is very secretive about his personal life and past, but Kale invites Will to dinner with him and his live-in male partner at home. He twice mentions he was formerly in CIA "black ops", and that he was involved in a series of assassinations in Beirut in the 1980s.
- Miranda Richardson as Katherine Rhumor: the widow of businessman Tom Rhumor (Harris Yulin), who committed suicide. Determined to understand the reasons for the suicide, she turns to his best friend for help. When she realizes that he cannot be trusted, she is forced to investigate her husband's death on her own.

=== Supporting cast ===
- Michael Cristofer as Truxton Spangler: the formidable head of API and an executive of industrial titan Atlas MacDowell. A graduate of Harvard Law School, Spangler is an eccentric but brilliant man with an unusual sense of humor and highly suspicious nature. He discovered Kale Ingram and his associate Donald Bloom during their operations in Syria, and uses their talents for his own interests. He is zealously dedicated to maintaining API's independence from the government, and is initially fond of Will until he learns too much. Spangler is the brains of the conspiracy and uses intelligence from API to anticipate or create international crises for profit.
- Roger Robinson as Ed Bancroft: a genius and former API analyst whose intelligence and knack for pattern recognition exceeds that of Will. Prone to obsessive behavior, his compulsive drive to chart labyrinthine codes eventually caused a nervous breakdown, forcing him into retirement and a permanently fragile emotional state. He remained a long-time friend of David Hadas, who kept him updated about the events at API. He helps Will solve the mystery surrounding David's death, despite Will's concern for the effect his exhaustive efforts may be having on his psyche.
- Peter Gerety as David Hadas: Will's father-in-law and the original head of Will's team. He is preoccupied with superstitions and numerology, particularly bad luck and the number 13. After showing the crossword puzzle to Kale, he is killed in a commuter rail accident that Will suspects was an engineered assassination.
- David Rasche as James Wheeler: a friend of Tom Rhumor and member of the conspiracy. He is initially sent to monitor Katherine Rhumor's actions following her husband's suicide, but his patronizing attitude backfires and prompts her to investigate Tom's death. Wheeler shows signs of remorse for his part in the conspiracy and lies about Katherine's activities to the conspirators out of guilt and romantic interest in her. Wheeler soon realizes that Spangler is having him monitored and he ends his contact with Katherine.
- Annie Parisse as Andy: Will's neighbour and eventual love interest. Ostensibly an artist, she provides sanctuary to Will once he comes to realize that his apartment is under heavy surveillance. She is ultimately revealed to actually be an asset of an undisclosed intelligence organization.
- Natalie Gold as Julia Harwell: A fellow API employee who initially comes to Will's team when Miles Fiedler solicits her services as a translator. The recently separated Fiedler quickly develops romantic feelings for her. Harwell later more formally fills in on Will's team for Tanya MacGaffin after MacGaffin's substance abuse issues come to light.

== Episodes ==
The series debuted on AMC on August 1, 2010, with a two-hour broadcast of the pilot followed by episode 2. The pilot episode was given two preview showings; once after the season 3 finale of Breaking Bad on June 13, 2010, and again after the season 4 premiere of Mad Men on July 25, 2010. The first sneak preview was viewed by 2 million viewers, making it the most watched debut of an AMC original series at that time. The second received 818,000 viewers. The series was cancelled on November 11, 2010, owing to its low ratings.

No.	Title	Directed by	Written by	Original release date	US viewers (millions)
1	"Gone in the Teeth"	Allen Coulter	Jason Horwitch	June 13, 2010	1.07
Intelligence analyst Will Travers suffers a shocking tragedy when his father-in law and mentor, David Hadas, is killed in a train accident. Will believes that Hadas was murdered which leads him to clues in a mysterious conspiracy. While investigating, he gets promoted to team leader - the position previously held by David. Katherine Rhumor questions the unexpected suicide of her billionaire husband, Tom, who killed himself after finding a four-leaf clover in his daily newspaper.
2	"The First Day of School"	Guy Ferland	Story by : Jason Horwitch and Henry Bromell; Teleplay by : Henry Bromell	August 1, 2010	1.90
Will faces his first day as the boss to his former teammates, not knowing that his assistant Maggie is spying on him for his supervisor Kale. Katherine goes on the reading of her husband's will and discovers that he had led a double life.
3	"Keep the Ends Out"	Jeremy Podeswa	Michael Oates Palmer	August 8, 2010	1.20
Katherine commiserates with Tom's best friend, James Wheeler, who seems to share her grief and confusion over Tom's suicide. Will disassembles the motorcycle David gave him, finds an encrypted list of numbers and a gun, but David's son Evan visits Will to reclaim the motorcycle. Maggie's ex-husband returns asking forgiveness; when Maggie relays this news to Kale, he warns against trusting the man.
4	"The Outsider"	Jeremy Podeswa	Richard E. Robbins	August 15, 2010	1.18
Truxton Spangler invites Will on a business trip to DC, leaving Will's team to determine if the American government should proceed with a political assassination without Will's input, who is out of the loop regarding the nature of the assignment. Miles hides from the team the fact that he and his wife are separated and most likely heading for divorce. Katherine's attempt to move on is derailed when she finds a suspicious message on Tom's cell phone from the day before he died.
5	"Connect the Dots"	Nick Gomez	Nichole Beattie	August 22, 2010	1.14
Frustrated by the lack of progress in the investigation of her husband's death, Katherine takes matters into her own hands by visiting a small, apparently failing company that Tom left her, and decides not to sell the business until she can determine why Tom left it to her. At a charity fundraiser thrown by Spangler's wife Will and Katherine meet briefly, where Will begins to suspect that Spangler is involved in the conspiracy.
6	"Look to the Ant"	Seith Mann	Zack Whedon	August 29, 2010	1.31
With Ingram's help Will realizes that his apartment is bugged, and he assures himself that someone is following him too. While Maggie's daughter is with her ex-husband for the night, Maggie indulges in a one-night stand. Meanwhile at API Miles engages the assistance of an analyst from another department, Julia (Natalie Gold). Katherine visits the wife of a man who committed suicide, and whom Tom had been researching after replacing him on the board of the company he left Katherine. She is shocked when she finds a four-leaf clover.
7	"The Truth Will Out"	Alik Sakharov	Eliza Clark	September 5, 2010	1.27
The FBI puts API on lockdown and submits Will, Ingram, Spangler, and Will's team to polygraph examinations to expose a possible mole within the organization, which Miles suspects is himself, but proves to be wrong. Katherine realizes that she isn't safe in her own home following a late night break-in.
8	"Caught in the Suck"	Ed Bianchi	Blake Masters	September 12, 2010	1.16
Will′s clues lead him to the company Tom left Katherine - Atlas MacDowell. Meanwhile the CIA sends Miles and Tanya to torture cell to oversee the interrogation of a captured Al-Qaeda member, and later Tanya is suspended from Will's team. Katherine receives a mysterious envelope with a picture and a drawing of a four-leaf clover behind it.
9	"No Honesty in Men"	Alan Taylor	Eliza Clark	September 19, 2010	1.03
Will decides to move out of his apartment and starts a sexual relationship with his next-door neighbor Andy (Annie Parisse). Julia is put as a replacement for Tanya, to Miles' surprise. Katherine reaches out to Tom's ex-wife for answers about his past. After suspecting both Kale and Will, Truxton approaches Grant asking him if he'll take Will's position if something happens to Will anytime soon.
10	"In Whom We Trust"	Keith Gordon	Nichole Beattie	September 26, 2010	0.97
Tanya starts going to rehab and begins her recovery. Will secretly reaches out to Katherine and they understand that they are on different ends of the same path.
11	"A Good Day's Work"	Brad Anderson	Zack Whedon	October 3, 2010	1.00
Tanya re-joins the team for a while and is angered after seeing Julia in the team. Truxton decides to terminate Will and orders Bloom to kill him, which he doesn't succeed in and Will kills him. Katherine decides to stay home after Bloom's threat but uncovers a mysterious cassone and the final clue left by Tom in it.
12	"Wayward Sons"	Michael Slovis	Richard E. Robbins	October 10, 2010	1.26
API joins forces with the FBI and CIA to locate a terrorist before he strikes, much to Tanya and Miles' dismay; Will and Grant are sent into the field to question people involved with the terrorist. Ingram asks Maggie to watch on Katherine, but she decides to go to Andy's house after Will requests her, where she finds out that Andy and Will are in a relationship. Katherine finds Meet Me in St. Louis which she believes is the key to Tom's suicide. Finally, API doesn't manage to stop the terrorist from striking and the USA is under attack.
13	"You Never Can Win"	Henry Bromell	Henry Bromell	October 17, 2010	1.04
Will uncovers the missing link between Spangler and Hadas' death and finally uncovers the conspiracy by Atlas McDowell to profit from world-changing events. Will confronts Spangler, who was sent the four-leaf clover by the conspiracy group. Katherine finally discovers the real reason why her husband Tom committed suicide and his involvement in the conspiracy. Prior to his suicide, Tom left a message on a DVD that if Katherine is in danger she should visit Andy (Will's mysterious neighbor). Katherine is murdered by a conspiracy agent before she can give Will the DVD message from Tom and David Hadas.

== Reception ==
Rubicon received generally favorable reviews. On Rotten Tomatoes, it received a 69% approval rating with an average score of 7.75 out of 10 based on 29 reviews and a critical consensus of, "Rubicon creates an intellectual puzzle for the mind that is pieced together with skillful writing, acting, and carefully-crafted storytelling." On Metacritic, it scored 69 out of 100 based on 28 critic reviews. Most of the critics praised the show's cast and atmosphere, but many have criticized the lack of action and the slow development of the central mystery. The show has often been compared to AMC's other shows, Mad Men and Breaking Bad, because of their success and originality, Entertainment Weekly's Ken Tucker ended his review with such a comparison saying "Rubicon doesn't have the glossy panache of Mad Men or the in-your-face confrontations of Breaking Bad, but I think that's a good thing. It establishes Rubicon as its own distinct creation from AMC." About the lack of action on the show, Scott D. Pierce for the Deseret News wrote, "For a show that's supposed to be a spy thriller, there aren't a whole lot of thrills in Rubicon." Maureen Ryan from the Chicago Tribune commented, "This pleasantly low-key drama has little trouble creating an atmosphere, but the pace is sometimes slack in the first four episodes." However, some critics found the lack of action as smart and creative, as Tucker wrote: "Rubicon does it by creating an eerily quiet world in which small moments can generate great suspense. The discovery of a spy's clues planted in crossword puzzles, or Will's insistence that a guy is following him while we are shown that two different men are tailing him—these carry more dramatic weight than a score of car chases or martial-arts fight scenes."

After the last episode had been aired, Adam Kirsch in The New Republic highlighted that the series had two parallel stories that seemed 40 years apart: Will's unraveling of the conspiracy, which so much tries to recreate the 1970s conspiracy films in which nobody seems to know that emails, databases and USB sticks have been invented; and the work of the analysts, which is definitely set in our post 9/11 world.

Rubicon made appearances in several 2010 top ten lists. Therese Odell, of the Houston Chronicle, listed Rubicon as the third best TV show of 2010, while Time magazine's James Poniewozik called Rubicon the ninth best show of the year. Rubicon also appears in Robert Lloyd's list, published in the Los Angeles Times, of the 10 shows that "made TV worth watching" in 2010, as well as in Maureen Ryan's list for TV Squad of the best TV of 2010.

In a 2010 article entitled "Whither Intelligence? Where Espionage Goes Wrong", David A. Andelman, writing for the World Policy Journal, described Rubicon as "perhaps the single most realistic interpretation of intelligence analysis".

== Online promotion ==
Promotion on AMC's Rubicon website included the "Intelligence Team Aptitude Test", a personality quiz that told users which job they'd be best suited for at the American Policy Institute (the fictional intelligence agency featured on the show). Inspired by Will's discovery of a code hidden within newspaper crossword puzzles in episode 1, The New York Times created an original Rubicon-themed crossword puzzle prior to Rubicon's premiere which eventually became exclusively available on AMC's Rubicon website. Promotion also included "Maggie’s Blog", a personal blog authored by one of the show's characters, Maggie Young. AMC's Rubicon website also featured exclusive sneak peek and behind the scenes videos, trivia games, numerous photo galleries, episode and character guides, a blog, and a community forum.

== Awards and nominations ==
In 2011, Rubicon received a Creative Arts Emmy nomination for Outstanding Main Title Design for Theo Daley (designer), Cara McKenney (producer/art director), Jeremy Cox (designer/animator) and Karin Fong (creative director).
