= Henry Bromell =

American novelist

- Born: Alfred Henry Bromell; September 19, 1947; Columbus, Ohio, U.S.
- Died: March 18, 2013 (aged 65); Santa Monica, California, U.S.
- Education: Eaglebrook School; United World College of the Atlantic; Amherst College
- Occupations: Novelist; screenwriter; film director
- Years active: 1994–2013
- Spouse(s): Caroline Thompson (m. 1982-85); Trish Soodik (–2009); Sarah (−2013)
- Children: 2; including Will Soodik

Alfred Henry Bromell (September 19, 1947 – March 18, 2013) was an American novelist, screenwriter, and director.

== Career ==
Bromell joined the crew of NBC police drama Homicide: Life on the Street in 1994. He served as a writer and co-executive producer for the show's third season. He contributed to writing seven episodes for the season. He was promoted to executive producer for the fourth season and wrote a further 17 episodes. He scaled back his involvement with the fifth season and became a consulting producer. He wrote a further two episodes before leaving the crew at the end of the season in 1997. He contributed to a total of 26 episodes as a writer over three seasons with the series. He returned as a co-writer and co-executive producer for the feature-length follow-up Homicide: The Movie in 2000.

He wrote and produced for many television series, including Chicago Hope, Northern Exposure, Homicide: Life on the Street, Brotherhood, Carnivàle, and Rubicon. He was a consulting producer, and later executive producer on the Showtime series Homeland at the time of his death and wrote four episodes: "The Good Soldier", "Representative Brody", "Q&A", and "Broken Hearts". He was awarded a Writers Guild of America Award for "The Good Soldier", and he was posthumously awarded a Primetime Emmy Award for Outstanding Writing for a Drama Series for "Q&A". He shared the Primetime Emmy Award for Outstanding Drama Series and the Golden Globe Award for Best Television Series – Drama with the other producers of Homeland in 2012. He was nominated in the same category at the Emmys for his work on the 1993 TV series I'll Fly Away, for which he was awarded a Writers Guild of America Award for the episode titled "Amazing Grace".

Bromell wrote and directed the feature film Panic (2000), which was nominated for the top prize at the Deauville Film Festival, and tele-movie Last Call (aka Fitzgerald), with Jeremy Irons playing writer F. Scott Fitzgerald.

Bromell co-wrote the pilot of the USA Network TV series Falling Water, which he co-created with Blake Masters.

== Personal life ==
Bromell's father served in the Central Intelligence Agency.

Bromell attended Eaglebrook School (1963) and the United World College of the Atlantic (1964–1966). He graduated from Amherst College in 1970. He won the Houghton Mifflin Literary Award for his first novel, The Slightest Distance. His collection of short stories, I Know Your Heart, Marco Polo, was published by Knopf. Bromell's work has appeared in two O. Henry Award collections.

Bromell's first wife was the screenwriter and director Caroline Thompson. He then married writer Trish Soodik, who died of cancer in January 2009; they had a son, William. His third wife was Sarah.

Bromell died March 18, 2013, of a heart attack, at UCLA Santa Monica hospital at age 65.

== Selected bibliography ==
- The Slightest Distance (1974) Houghton Mifflin, ISBN 978-0-395-19408-9
- I Know Your Heart, Marco Polo: Stories (1979) Knopf, ISBN 978-0-394-50116-1
- Follower: A Novel (1983) Simon & Schuster, ISBN 978-0-671-43271-3
- Little America (2002) Vintage, ISBN 978-0-375-71891-5

=== Short stories ===
Title	Publication	Collected in
"Photographs"	The New Yorker (April 29, 1972)	The Slightest Distance
"The Slightest Distance"	The New Yorker (August 5, 1972)	The Slightest Distance
"Early Sunday Morning"	The New Yorker (March 3, 1973)	The Slightest Distance
"Mime"	The New Yorker (July 9, 1973)	The Slightest Distance
"Heart of Light"	The New Yorker (July 30, 1973)	The Slightest Distance
"Old Friends"	The New Yorker (December 17, 1973)	The Slightest Distance
"Jewels and Binoculars"	The New Yorker (May 6, 1974)	The Slightest Distance
"Balcony"	The New Yorker (June 10, 1974)	The Slightest Distance
"The Girl with the Sun in Her Eyes"	The Atlantic (August 1974)	The Slightest Distance
"Partial Magic"	The New Yorker (September 6, 1976)	I Know Your Heart, Marco Polo
"The World in a Room"	The New Yorker (November 1, 1976)	I Know Your Heart, Marco Polo
"I Know Your Heart, Marco Polo"	The New Yorker (March 6, 1978)	I Know Your Heart, Marco Polo
"Travel Stories"	The New Yorker (June 19, 1978)	I Know Your Heart, Marco Polo
