= Exodus (Battlestar Galactica) =

- Battlestar Galactica episodes
- The fleet is reunited.
- Episode nos.: Season 3 Episodes 3 & 4
- Directed by: Félix Enríquez Alcalá
- Written by: Bradley Thompson; David Weddle
- Original air dates: October 13, 2006 (Part 1); October 20, 2006 (Part 2)

Guest appearances
- Amanda Plummer as Oracle Selloi; Richard Hatch as Tom Zarek; Rick Worthy as Simon; Callum Keith Rennie as Leoben Conoy; Kate Vernon as Ellen Tigh; Michael Trucco as Samuel Anders; Donnelly Rhodes as Cottle; Matthew Bennett as Number Five; Rekha Sharma as Tory Foster; Dean Stockwell as Cavil; Erica Cerra as Maya; Luciana Carro as Louanne "Kat" Katraine; Brad Dryborough as Louis Hoshi; Leah Cairns as Margaret "Racetrack" Edmondson; Madeline Parker as Kacey Brynn; Dominic Zamprogna as James "Jammer" Lyman; Eileen Pedde as Erin Mathias; Jennifer Halley as Diana Seelix; Ty Olsson as Aaron Kelly; Ryan Robbins as Charlie Connor; Emilie Ullerup as Julia Brynn; Winston Rekert as Priest

Episode chronology
← Previous "Precipice"	Next → "Collaborators"
- Battlestar Galactica season 3

"Exodus" (parts one and two) are the third and fourth episodes of the third season from the science fiction television series, Battlestar Galactica. The episodes originally aired on the Sci Fi Channel on October 16 and 23, 2006.

The plot details the struggle of the human refugees, led by Colonel Saul Tigh, as they lead an insurrection on Cylon-controlled planet New Caprica. Meanwhile, Admiral Adama and the crews of Galactica and Pegasus plan a rescue attempt of the survivors.

== Plot ==
=== Part one ===
In the end of the previous episode "Precipice", 200 humans are facing a Cylon Centurion firing squad. A few hours prior, Galen Tyrol (Aaron Douglas) receives the list from a source, and gathers a group of armed resistance members to the execution site and are able to destroy the Centurions before the execution takes place. Former Galactica deckhand Jammer, who led the police forces and helped Cally Tyrol escape, barely escapes with his life. Meanwhile, Sharon Agathon (Grace Park), Samuel Anders (Michael Trucco) and other resistance members are under fire from another group of Centurions, but are rescued by marines Sharon posted. Afterwards, Sharon discusses with the resistance her plan to rescue those on New Caprica from the Cylons; she is to go into the Cylon compound in the city to gather the launch keys for the ships on the ground while Galactica will distract the Cylons so the humans can escape. Anders finds the rendezvous map on one of the dead Cylons that Ellen Tigh (Kate Vernon) claimed to have burned. He confronts Saul Tigh (Michael Hogan) about his wife's betrayal. Ellen confesses to her action, but claims to be doing it to keep Tigh alive.

Meanwhile, D'Anna Biers (Lucy Lawless) has a nightmare and visits an oracle, who hints that Hera, the Cylon-Human baby who was born and supposedly killed in "Downloaded" is still alive, and D'Anna "will know true love" again and hold the child in her arms. Later, Sharon infiltrates the Cylon compound and acquires the launch keys, but is stopped by D'Anna, who recognizes her immediately, and tells her Hera is still alive. However, Sharon refuses to believe it. To prevent D'Anna from warning the Cylons, Sharon incapacitates her by knee-capping her. Having heard the launch keys have been retrieved, Admiral William Adama (Edward James Olmos) starts preparation for battle. He instructs his son Lee "Apollo" Adama (Jamie Bamber) to wait for 18 hours. Should Adama fail to arrive in time, Apollo should lead the remainder of the fleet to Earth.

=== Part two ===
Having been warned by Anders that Ellen will be executed for treason unless he kills her himself, Tigh sits down with Ellen to talk about her actions. Tigh hands her a drink, which is tainted with poison. After Ellen succumbs to it, Tigh grieves. Meanwhile, Galactica arrives in far orbit above New Caprica and sends raptors to launch drones, hoping to fool the Cylons into thinking two Battlestars are coming. On the surface, the resistance start their uprising by detonating several explosions to destroy critical infrastructures across the settlement. As Centurions are guarding the parked ships, Galactica jumps into the upper atmosphere, free-falling into the lower atmosphere to launch Vipers virtually on top of Centurion posts. Galactica jumps back into space, while the overall disturbance creates a distraction for the human survivors. The atmospheric free-fall causes considerable damage to Galactica. Adama discovers that four Basestars are surrounding them, two more than previously anticipated.

The Cylons believe they have lost control of the situation and plan to evacuate in a Basestar then detonate a nuclear weapon in the settlement. They offer Gaius Baltar (James Callis) the chance to join them; however, Felix Gaeta (Alessandro Juliani) takes out a gun and threatens to kill him. With these two and Caprica-Six (Tricia Helfer) alone, Gaeta realises there is a nuke and tells Baltar he has one more chance to redeem himself by preventing it from being detonated. While searching for the bomb, Baltar and Caprica-Six find a crying Hera lying with her foster mother Maya (Erica Cerra), who was killed during the evacuation. D'Anna also finds her and holds the baby in her arms. Caprica-Six persuades Baltar to allow this as D'Anna would no longer detonate the bomb once she found Hera. Anders breaks out the prisoners from the Cylon compound and finds Kara "Starbuck" Thrace (Katee Sackhoff), who rescues Kacey (Madeline Parker) from Leoben Conoy (Callum Keith Rennie) by killing him. At the same time, Laura Roslin leads forces that reclaim the abandoned Colonial One.

Galactica is overwhelmed by bombardment from the Basestars. As it is facing destruction, Pegasus makes a timely arrival, destroying a Basestar. Apollo, having disobeyed Adama's orders by bringing Pegasus into the fight, buys the crew of Galactica time to repair their faster-than-light (FTL) drives. In a last stand, Apollo evacuates Pegasus after setting a collision course with a Basestar. The ship rams into one, destroying both ships, with the debris causing the destruction of another Basestar. After the fleet is reunited, Starbuck prepares to announce Kacey as her daughter, but is dismayed to find another woman (Emilie Ullerup) recognising Kacey as her own daughter who was kidnapped by the Cylons. Laura Roslin (Mary McDonnell) learns from her aide Tory Foster (Rekha Sharma) that Maya and Hera did not make it off the planet. A crowd gathers to celebrate Adama for rescuing them.

== Reception ==
=== Ratings ===
These episodes set consecutive records for the lowest Nielsen rating for Battlestar Galactica episodes. Part One earned a 1.6 rating, the lowest at the time, while Part Two earned an even lower 1.5 rating.

=== Critical reception ===
Despite the low ratings, the episodes were well-received critically. Although there was some disappointment that Part I did not live up to the high standards of the season premiere, it was considered a solid episode and an appetizer for Part II. The second part was highly praised, with special attention to the performances of Michael Hogan and Kate Vernon as Colonel Tigh and his wife and Michael Trucco as Samuel Anders. The special effects, especially those surrounding the space battles, were also acclaimed by critics, and IGN referred to Adama's atmospheric entry maneuver with Galactica as "hands-down the coolest thing I have ever seen a Battlestar do, new or old series combined."

=== Awards ===
The episode won the 2007 Emmy Award for Outstanding Special Visual Effects For A Series and was nominated for Primetime Emmy Awards for Outstanding Directing For A Drama Series and Outstanding Sound Editing For A Series. Michael Hogan submitted this episode for consideration in the category of "Outstanding Supporting Actor in a Drama Series" on his behalf for the 2007 Emmy Awards. These two episodes also won the 2007 VES Award for "Outstanding Visual Effects in a Broadcast Series".
