= Occupation (Battlestar Galactica) =

- Battlestar Galactica episode
- Episode no.: Season 3 Episode 1
- Directed by: Sergio Mimica-Gezzan
- Written by: Ronald D. Moore
- Original air date: October 6, 2006

Guest appearances
- Lucy Lawless as Number Three; Callum Keith Rennie as Number Two; Kate Vernon as Ellen Tigh; Matthew Bennett as Number Five; Michael Trucco as Samuel Anders; Rekha Sharma as Tory Foster; Dean Stockwell as Number One; Luciana Carro as Louanne "Kat" Katraine; Christian Tessier as Tucker "Duck" Clellan; Leah Cairns as Margaret "Racetrack" Edmondson; Dominic Zamprogna as Jammer; Ryan McDonell as Eammon "Gonzo" Pike; Colin Lawrence as Hamish "Skulls" McCall

Episode chronology
← Previous "Lay Down Your Burdens"	Next → "Precipice"
- Battlestar Galactica season 3

"Occupation" is the third season premiere and 34th episode of the re-imagined American science fiction drama television series Battlestar Galactica. The episode was written by re-imagined creator Ronald D. Moore, and directed by Sergio Mimica-Gezzan. It first aired on October 6, 2006 on the Sci-Fi Channel along with the following episode "Precipice". In the episode, the Cylons are in their fourth month of a military occupation on New Caprica, where the majority of the human population are residing. A resistance movement is trying to drive the Cylons away. Meanwhile, Admiral William Adama continues his plan to rescue everybody there. Unlike most episodes up to this point, it does not include a survivor count, leaving it unclear as to how many died when several ships were destroyed in the previous episode.

The story behind the episode was inspired by several wars and occupations in the past, including the Quartering Acts and the Iraq War. Several parts of the episode changed from the script, more predominantly the scenes involving a suicide bombing. The producers were worried that the Sci Fi Channel would not allow the inclusion of the scene. The episode was seen by 2.2 million viewers and attracted generally positive reactions from critics. In addition, Moore's writing of the episode was nominated for an Emmy and a Writers Guild of America award.

== Plot ==
Four months have passed since the end of "Lay Down Your Burdens", where Cylons found the majority of the human population on a planet known as New Caprica, which had supposedly been hidden from DRADIS, and commenced their occupation. A few thousand humans had escaped in the remaining spaceships following Battlestars Galactica and Pegasus. Admiral William Adama (Edward James Olmos) is continuing to work on a plan to free those trapped on New Caprica. His son and commander of Pegasus Lee "Apollo" Adama (Jamie Bamber) confronts his father on pushing his Viper pilots beyond the breaking point, to which Adama says Apollo is becoming "soft." Apollo's wife, Anastasia Dualla (Kandyse McClure) surprises him by supporting the Admiral.

On New Caprica, Kara "Starbuck" Thrace (Katee Sackhoff) is placed in an elaborate prison cell made to look like her old apartment on Caprica by Leoben Conoy (Callum Keith Rennie), who is attempting to force her to fall in love with him. Starbuck kills him several times, though Leoben always downloads into another body. Saul Tigh (Michael Hogan) is in a Cylon detention facility, where his right eye was forcibly removed. He is released when his wife Ellen Tigh (Kate Vernon) performs sexual favors for the Cylon Brother Cavil (Dean Stockwell). Tigh returns to Samuel Anders (Michael Trucco) and Galen Tyrol (Aaron Douglas), who have been leading a resistance movement against the Cylons, having detonated a bomb in a Cylon docking facility as Tigh is released. Now free, Tigh resorts to escalating their efforts, by planning suicide bombings against the Cylons and any human collaborators.

The resistance is given intelligence by an unidentified informant from the Cylon command structure, by use of a secret dead drop; flipping a dog bowl and hiding some documents inside the tent next to it. One piece of intelligence given is information on a Cylon communications blocker; the resistance makes use of that information to contact a Raptor orbiting the planet. The Raptor returns to Galactica with news they have made contact with the resistance on the planet.

Next, the resistance plans to kill the President of the Colonies, Gaius Baltar (James Callis), who is unwillingly collaborating with the Cylons. They learn he is to attend a graduation ceremony for the New Caprica Police, an unpopular masked police force set up by the Cylons to allow the humans to police the city and do the Cylons' bidding. Tucker "Duck" Clellan (Christian Tessier), who has access to the ceremony and whose wife had been killed by the Cylons, agrees to suicide bomb the ceremony. Towards the end of the episode it is revealed that Baltar's aide, Felix Gaeta (Alessandro Juliani) is the informant. He learns that Baltar will not be attending the ceremony, but cannot alert the resistance in time. Duck attends the ceremony, and when Number Three (Lucy Lawless) comes to shake his hand, Duck detonates the bomb, killing everybody in the room.

== Production ==
=== Writing ===
"Occupation", and following episode "Precipice" were written by series creator Ronald D. Moore. The Cylon occupation of New Caprica, and the human resistance fighting them, was inspired by wars and military occupations from history, including the Quartering Acts, World War II, and the more recent occupation in Iraq. In the original writing, Moore did not originally consider including Tigh with an eye removed until the final drafts were written. Portraying actor Michael Hogan was initially hesitant with the idea. He recalled that when the producers called him to talk about how his character would be maimed, they suggested having an eye removed. Hogan responded by laughing, and the producers assumed he agreed.

When Anders and Tyrol detonate the bomb at the beginning of the episode, one of the Number Three (D'anna) models was to film a propaganda film in front of Laura Roslin's (Mary McDonnell) school at the time, but that was cut. Also, Jammer (Dominic Zamprogna) was originally considered the suicide bomber at the end, but was changed to Duck because he had less to live for after his wife's death. In the original drafts, the resistance was not planning suicide bombings, but "freaking the Cylons out" by imprisoning many of them in a secret underground prison, torture them for information, and leave them alive instead of killing them, as they would resurrect otherwise. This would make the Cylons worry about their missing comrades. However, Moore later realized that suicide bombings would be "really potent and really powerful." When writing the scenes involving Duck leading to the suicide bombing, Moore got "emotionally caught up in it," adding "as I was writing these scenes of him standing in the police ranks, we know he's got the belt on. What's he gonna do? And then, oh my God, he actually does it. I mean, it's really horrifying stuff. But it's true. That's why I want to do it. It really happens. People do this." The producers were initially worried that the Sci Fi Channel would not allow the inclusion of the bombing scene, but to Moore's surprise, Sci Fi executive Mark Stern did not object to it.

There was some debate among the writers on when Galactica and the fleet would be brought into the story. Moore decided to reintroduce the space-bound fleet in the beginning of the third act, in order to establish the story on New Caprica, and make the audience happy and more excited to see Galactica. Moore also decided to evolve one of the Number Eight Cylon models, Sharon Agathon (Grace Park) imprisoned on board the ship, where a year would allow Sharon and Admiral Adama to form a special relationship, eventually leading to Adama releasing her and allowing her to become a Colonial officer by the next episode. Moore felt "Occupation" was the best season premiere of Battlestar since "33", the first-season premiere, believing the writers "never quite matched" the performance on "33" in the following episodes. He also felt it was a better premiere than "Scattered" from the second season, as it contained disparate story lines where the characters were not fully reunited with each other until a few episodes in.

=== Filming and post-production ===
The episode began with one of the most extended recaps in the series, as the producers wanted to bring the audience up to date from the events from "Lay Down Your Burdens", which covered "quite a bit of ground" because of the large story development behind the finale. The scene where the Cylons meet in Colonial One became very tedious for the crew because several versions of the same Cylon model were used in the same shot, and the crew disliked filming on the set. Moore elaborated;

On top of [was] the difficulty of doing all these splits, and all these cross moves, and all these, lots of blue / green screen and visual effects setups, and that's very time consuming and it's all very technical and the actors have to do it many, many times in both positions and then there's all these continuity issues and eyelines and it's just like a complete pain in the ass thing. And so of course I gave them like four pages of dialogue to cover.

— Ronald D. Moore

The crew had to film different versions of the prayer scene before Duck commits the suicide attack. In making the photograph of him and his late wife Nora, Emily Holmes — her actress in the webisode series The Resistance — was not available, so the producers digitally inserted her face onto the photograph. The episode includes a voiceover of Roslin detailing the occupation and resistance. This was not originally added in the final script, but was instead considered during post-production of the episode. The ending for the episode was originally Leoben presenting Starbuck with Kacey Brynn, her "daughter," but for unspecified reasons, the scene was instead used for "Precipice".

== Reception ==
=== Broadcast and ratings ===
"Occupation" and "Precipice" was originally meant to be released as two separate episodes, however the producers decided to merge them to be released as a two-hour broadcast. The reasoning was partly due to the third episode "Exodus", which became too long and split to a two-part episode, and the producers did not wish to stretch the New Caprica storyline to several weeks. The first 13 minutes of the episode were leaked on the Sci Fi Channel website days prior the broadcast. The two-hour season three premiere was first broadcast on the Sci Fi Channel in the United States on Friday, October 6, 2006 between 9 pm and 11 pm. After its original broadcast, the two-hour episode attracted a household rating of 1.8, equalling a total of 2.2 million viewers. Ratings were an increase of 2 per cent in total viewing from the average ratings from the second half of the second season.

=== Reviews ===
"Occupation" received generally positive reviews from critics. Eric Goldman of IGN rated "Occupation" a "masterful" 10 out of 10, stating "watching the season premiere of Battlestar Galactica is a great reminder that this is truly still the best show on television." Ian Berriman of SFX called the episode a "stunning season opener," citing the similarities of the occupation of Iraq as its greatest strength, but also thought it was the episode's weakness. Berriman also liked Tigh's transformation to a "ruthless terrorist" and Starbuck's part of the episode. "Occupation" was rated five stars out of five.

Patrick Sauriol of UGO started the review stating "After the events of season two's cliffhanger, there were a hundred questions on the minds of the show's fans, but the biggest one gets answered with the Season Three double-header premiere: was the start of Season Three worth the wait or has the show jumped the shark? Answer: You better frakkin' believe that Battlestar Galactica hasn't jumped the shark." Sauriol commented that the time leap of a year was a "gutsy move," but felt it has "always been the case" for the series. However, he also felt that all doubts the audience might have to harbor "that this show won't live up to the first two seasons should be wiped away." Callis' performance was praised, with Sauriol stating "again Callis proves that he owns this role and again he proves tonight why Gaius Baltar is the best character on this show." Sauriol graded "Occupation" and the following "Precipice" A-. Television Without Pity gave the episode a B.

=== Awards and nominations ===
In 2007, the episode was nominated for a 59th Primetime Emmy Awards for "Outstanding Writing in a Drama Series", but lost to HBO's The Sopranos series finale "Made in America". It was also nominated for a Writers Guild of America Award for best Episodic Drama. However, the episode lost out to the pilot episode of Big Love.
