= He That Believeth in Me =

- Battlestar Galactica episode
- Episode no.: Season 4 Episode 1
- Directed by: Michael Rymer
- Written by: Bradley Thompson; David Weddle
- Original air date: April 4, 2008

Guest appearances
- Rekha Sharma as Tory Foster; Ryan Robbins as Charlie Connor; Keegan Connor Tracy as Jeanne; Lara Gilchrist as Paulla Schaffer; Leela Savasta as Tracey Anne

Episode chronology
← Previous; Razor	Next → "Six of One"
- Battlestar Galactica season 4

"He That Believeth in Me" is the first episode in the fourth season of the reimagined science fiction television series Battlestar Galactica. The episode aired on SCI FI and Space in the United States and Canada respectively on April 4, 2008, and aired on Sky1 in the United Kingdom on April 15, along with the following episode "Six of One". The episode's title is a reference to the Book of John, chapter 11:25-26 in the New Testament of the Bible, which quotes; "Jesus said unto her, I am the resurrection, and the life: he that believeth in me, though he were dead, yet shall he live..." The episode was generally well received and also won an Emmy Award.

Following the events in "Crossroads, Part 2", the fleet arrives in the Ionian Nebula to find a clue that will lead to Earth, only to find that the entire rag-tag fleet had mysteriously powered down and is hopelessly surrounded by Cylons. Lee Adama also encounters Kara Thrace, who was thought to have been killed in "Maelstrom" and claims to know where Earth is. The episode also deals with the aftermath of the identity of four of the five final Cylons, Samuel Anders, Tory Foster, Saul Tigh, and Galen Tyrol. The survivor count shown in the title sequence is 39,698.

== Plot ==
The episode opens where “Crossroads, Part 2” left off, with Lee Adama (Jamie Bamber) flying alongside Kara Thrace (Katee Sackhoff). Lee, still in disbelief, tells Kara he saw her die. Kara brushes this off as nonsense and begins telling Lee about how she has found Earth. The entire conversation is transmitted over wireless to Galactica, where Adama, Roslin, Helo, and the other bridge officers speculate that the resurrected Kara could be some sort of Cylon trick.

Meanwhile, the Cylon raiders are closing in on Galactica. Aided by Kara and Lee, the Viper force engage the Cylons. Though many of the raiders are destroyed, others break through and begin attacking the civilian fleet. They destroy one civilian ship and damage several others, killing at least 600 people in the process.

As the Cylons launch missiles at the civilian ships, Adama orders his gun batteries to stop defending Galactica and instead only target missiles headed toward the fleet. He then orders Tigh to launch every fighter the fleet has. Tigh, succumbing to his Cylon programming, pulls out his gun & shoots Adama, and then collapses into despair from what he has done— he then notices that Adama is still yelling orders at him, and realizes that he had just been hallucinating. He proceeds to carry out Adama’s orders.

Elsewhere, Anders is in his Viper, launching into space. He attempts to attack the Cylon ships, but finds himself too distracted by the knowledge that he himself is a Cylon. But when one of the raiders scans his ship ahead of attacking him, Anders’s iris glows, sending some sort of signal to the raider. The Cylons suddenly stop attacking— the raiders return to their base ships, which jump away without causing any further damage to the humans.

Gaius Baltar (James Callis) is taken to a monotheistic cult which has erected a shrine to him. One of the members, Jeanne (Keegan Connor Tracy), believes he can save her dying son. Though reluctant at first, Baltar prays and asks "the one true god" to take his life instead, as he caused the genocide of the twelve colonies and the child is innocent. The next day he is escorted to a bathroom to shave. Charlie Connor (Ryan Robbins), whose son was killed on New Caprica, plans to kill him. Instead of begging for his life, Baltar begs Connor to kill him. His escort breaks free and brutally attacks the captors. After the two return to the cult, Baltar is astonished to find Jeanne's son has been miraculously cured.

Starbuck returns with a seemingly brand new (Mk II) Viper. She doesn't recall being killed and believes she was only gone for six hours. President Roslin (Mary McDonnell) believes Starbuck is a Cylon, despite her having been cleared by the Cylon detector. Starbuck claims to know the location of Earth and insists that following the clue from the Eye of Jupiter is a mistake. With each FTL jump, her sense of Earth's location fades a bit more, after experiencing a short headache. Her attempts to convince Roslin fail. After another jump and headache, desperate to stop Roslin before her feeling fades forever, she subdues the Marines guarding Adama's quarters and holds Roslin at gunpoint.

== Production ==
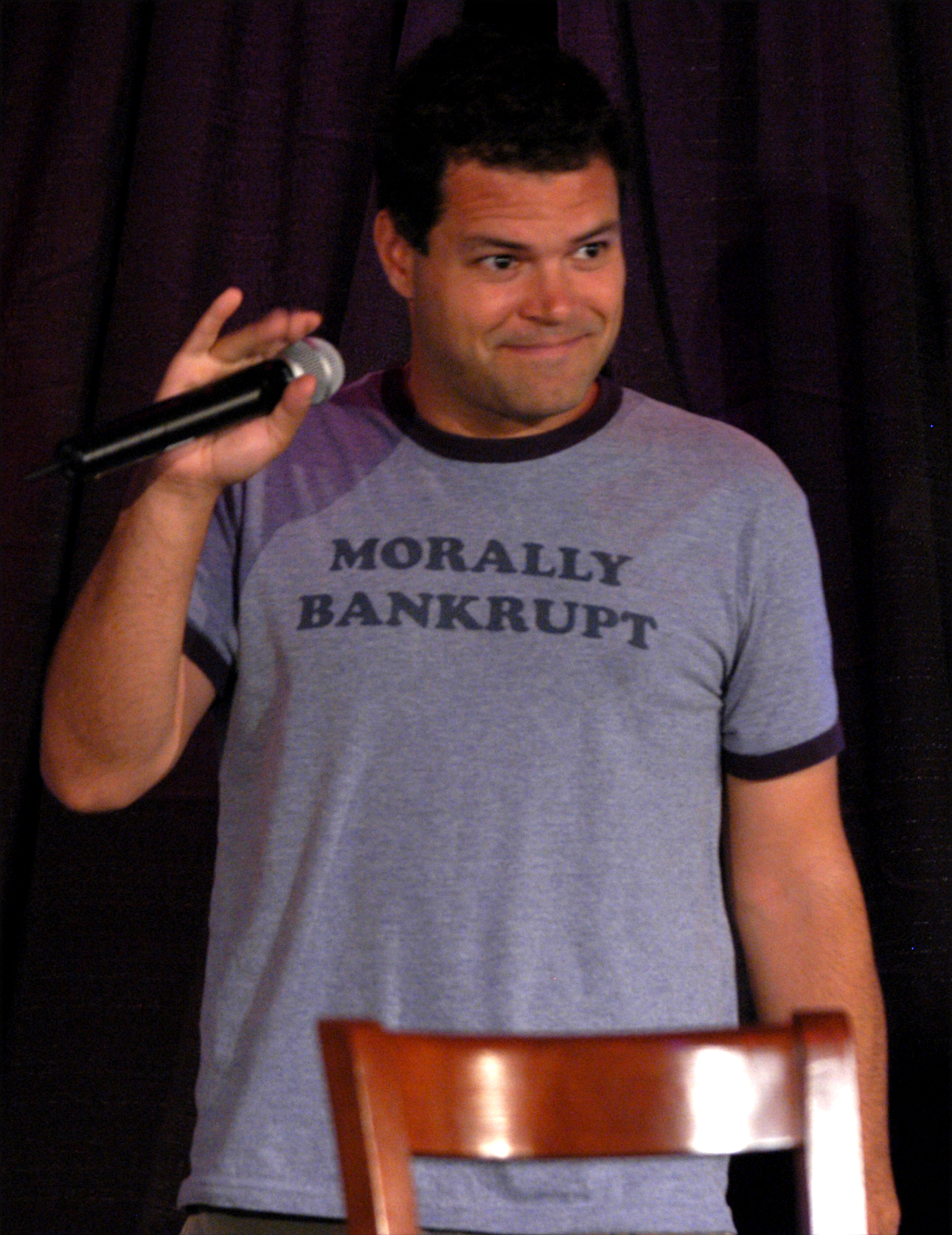
Aaron Douglas attempted an obscene ad-lib on one of his scenes.

Even though "He That Believeth in Me" is the continuation of the season three finale, "Crossroads, Part 2", the episode is often referred to as the third episode in the fourth season, since the producers widely regard Razor as the first two episodes in production. In the battle sequence for the teaser of the episode, Ronald D. Moore wanted to keep "the ring ship" (later known in the series as the Zephyr) from being destroyed, as he had gotten fond of the ship, and always wanted to have the interior of the ship in some sequences, so the ship was only damaged in the episode instead.

Moore called the battle sequence "remarkable", even though the series had already included several space battles. Moore felt they were not going to top the previous ones, but the visual effects team were able to pull it off as "the best battle sequence we've ever done." A scene cut from the teaser's battle sequence showed Samuel Anders aiming his Viper's guns at Diana Seelix's ship after discovering his Cylon nature. Another Anders cut scene focused on cutting the cast off his leg, due to the absence of his leg injury sustained from "The Son Also Rises". With Baltar's storyline, the writers refer to the rooms used by his cult as "Baltar's lair". Also, as the writers were aware that Baltar himself was visually similar to Jesus, Moore points out that he is not Jesus, though he admitted that the visual similarities help to "drive some things home".

Aaron Douglas, who portrays Galen Tyrol, attempted an ad lib on one of his scenes. On that particular scene, Tyrol told the Viper pilots in the hangar, "Let's go, nuggets! Your mommas aren't going to save ya today." In one take, Douglas replaced this with "drop your dicks and grab your sticks!" According to Douglas, "five seconds later Harvey [Frand] (producer) says from video village, 'you can't say dicks on TV'. We had to do it again. [...] It's great to be back but it's sad to see it go."

The scene where Saul Tigh has the vision of shooting William Adama was not filmed in one shot, but was edited in such a way that the cut would only become noticeable if one looks at the scene closely. Moore considered cutting the scene despite loving it, but eventually decided to keep it.

== Reception ==
In the United States, the episode did a 1.3 household rating and a 2.0 share, with a 1.1 household rating and 3.0 share in the 18- to 49-year-old target demographic. The episode had 2.138 million viewers, making it the third most-watched primetime cable program on Friday, April 4, 2008, the fourth most-watched program in the 18- to 49-year-old demographic, and the most-watched show in the coveted 25- to 54-year-old demographic. The episode was the show's best performance in the 18- to 49-year-old demographic since "Resurrection Ship, Part 2" aired in the United States on January 13, 2006. It was the show's best performance in the 25- to 54-year-old demographic since "Occupation" aired in the United States on October 6, 2006 (the series' Season 3 premiere). Forty-three percent of the episode's 18-to-49 viewership in the U.S. was female.

When viewers watching the show on DVRs over the seven days following the episode's initial airing were included, the episode's ratings rose to a 1.9 household rating, with 1.8 million viewers aged 18–49, 1.9 million viewers aged 25–54, and 2.6 million total viewers. This was the series' best performance in all three key demographic categories since the season two premiere in July 2005. This also made "He That Believeth in Me" the most-watched cable program for the day in both the 18- to 49-year-old and 25- to 54-year-old demographic categories. In 2008, the visual effects team for the episode won and received the Primetime Emmy Award for Outstanding Special Visual Effects.

The SyFy Portal received the episode positively, praising the return of Starbuck, as well as the space battle in the beginning, but criticised the episode that it was generally for the "existing viewer". IGN rated the episode an "impressive" rating of 8 out of a possible 10, stating "Galactica is back, about frakking time" and that the episode "quickly reminds us why we love this show, the world it exists in, and the people that populate it." IGN also praised the episode for Starbuck's return, as well as James Callis' portrayal of the several sides of Gaius Baltar.
