= Collaborators (Battlestar Galactica) =

- Battlestar Galactica episode
- Episode no.: Season 3 Episode 5
- Directed by: Michael Rymer
- Written by: Mark Verheiden
- Original air date: October 27, 2006

Guest appearances
- Richard Hatch as Tom Zarek; Lucy Lawless as Number Three; Rick Worthy as Simon; Callum Keith Rennie as Leoben Conoy; Matthew Bennett as Number Five; Michael Trucco as Samuel Anders; Rekha Sharma as Tory Foster; Luciana Carro as Louanne "Kat" Katraine; Leah Cairns as Margaret "Racetrack" Edmondson; Alisen Down as Jean Barolay; Dominic Zamprogna as Jammer; Nicki Clyne as Cally Henderson; Jennifer Halley as Diana Seelix; Ryan Robbins as Charlie Connor

Episode chronology
← Previous "Exodus"	Next → "Torn"
- Battlestar Galactica season 3

"Collaborators" is the fifth episode of the third season from the science fiction television series Battlestar Galactica.

This is the first episode of season 3 to include a survivor count, at 41,435, down considerably from the 49,550 shown in "Lay Down Your Burdens" (Part 2). Since then, there were undisclosed losses when several civilian ships were destroyed near the end of "Lay Down Your Burdens" (Part 2), while Admiral Adama reveals that "thousands of people" were later stranded on New Caprica during the events of "Exodus".

== Plot ==
In the absence of Gaius Baltar, Tom Zarek has become President of the Colonies. Realizing that the military will never back him as president, he agrees to step down in favor of Laura Roslin. He will re-convene the Quorum of Twelve, nominate Roslin as vice president, and then resign once she is confirmed. He asks Roslin if he can still have a role in the new government, and she offers him the Vice-Presidency.

Zarek secretly authorizes a group called "The Circle", consisting of Colonel Tigh, Chief Tyrol, Samuel Anders, and three others to judge and execute those whom they unanimously find to have collaborated with the Cylons during their occupation of New Caprica. There is no formal trial; instead, the Circle reviews the available evidence, votes, and then offers the convicted a chance to plead their case. At least thirteen people are executed, including the spacing of flight deck specialist James "Jammer" Lyman. Jammer had once been a resistance fighter, but changed sides to the NCPD. He was also responsible for the death of the son of one of the Circle. Though Jammer reveals his rescue of Cally, Tyrol ultimately agrees that it doesn't exonerate him for his other sins and reluctantly allows the execution.

Felix Gaeta is brought to the Galactica CIC to repair its communications system and is verbally abused by Tigh for being a collaborator. Kara "Starbuck" Thrace later criticizes Gaeta over lunch. He claims to have explained repeatedly that he was funneling information to the resistance, but no one believes him. Starbuck appears traumatized by her long captivity with the Cylons, causing further rifts in her marriage to Anders.

The Circle starts debating Gaeta's potential execution, but Anders leaves mid-deliberation, unwilling to judge any more cases. Tigh replaces Anders with Starbuck, who votes for Gaeta's execution. Tigh and three others vote along with Starbuck and then eventually convince Tyrol to vote with them. The Circle then abducts Gaeta and prepares to execute him. An angry Starbuck demands that he beg for his life and attacks him, reminding him of what he told her in the mess hall, including the dog bowl dead drop. Chief Tyrol realizes that Gaeta had been the resistance's source and sets him free. Stunned by the revelation that they almost executed an innocent man, the Circle quietly disbands.

Roslin and Admiral Adama finally learn of The Circle. Zarek tells Roslin that holding public trials would only cause unacceptable infighting within the fleet. After Roslin takes her presidential oath of office, she announces a general pardon and announces the formation of a truth commission to reconcile the fleet.

Meanwhile, Baltar is held prisoner on a Cylon Basestar; the Cylons are debating whether they should have brought along a human. Of the seven models taking part in the decision, the issue is deadlocked three for and three against. The final decision rests with Number Six. Caprica-Six visits Baltar and ends their relationship, at first leaving his fate uncertain. Finally, it becomes clear that the Cylons have decided to spare his life.

== Television ratings ==
This episode was the third in a row to set a new low for Battlestar Galactica ratings, earning 1.4 in the Nielsen ratings after the two parts of "Exodus" earned 1.6 and 1.5, respectively.

== Emmy Award consideration ==
This episode was submitted for consideration in the category of "Outstanding Drama Series" for the 2007 Emmy Awards.
