= The Ties That Bind (Battlestar Galactica) =

- Battlestar Galactica episode
- Episode no.: Season 4 Episode 3
- Directed by: Michael Nankin
- Written by: Michael Taylor
- Original air date: April 18, 2008

Guest appearances
- Richard Hatch as Tom Zarek; Rekha Sharma as Tory Foster; Donnelly Rhodes as Sherman Cottle; Dean Stockwell as John Cavil; Nicki Clyne as Cally Henderson Tyrol; Matthew Bennett as Aaron Doral

Episode chronology
| ← Previous "Six of One" | Next → "Escape Velocity" |
- Battlestar Galactica season 4

"The Ties That Bind" is the third episode in the fourth season of the reimagined science fiction television series Battlestar Galactica. The episode originally aired on SCI FI and Space in the United States and Canada respectively on April 18, 2008, and on Sky1 in the United Kingdom on April 22. The episode's title is a reference to a Christian hymn, "Blessed Be the Tie that Binds".

The episode mainly focuses on the four of the final five Cylons, particularly Galen Tyrol, as his relationship with his wife, Cally becomes even more strained. Meanwhile, Kara Thrace and her team on the Demetrius start their search for Earth. The episode also deals with the significant six Cylons after three of the models decide to force the other three not to lobotomize the Raiders, which leads the two factions to a civil war. The survivor count shown in the title sequence is 39,676.

== Plot ==
A Brother Cavil model resurrects from the dead after one of the Sixes (Natalie) starts a rebellion to unbox the Three models to learn the identity of the final five. Surprisingly, Cavil agrees to this. They decide to send a fleet of basestars and a resurrection ship to the location where the Threes were boxed. However, when they get there, the resurrection ship does not follow. Instead, Cavil's baseships circle the rebels and proceed to destroy them. Meanwhile, on the Demetrius, Kara Thrace and her crew have been searching for Earth by Starbuck's vision for 22 days without any success. The patience of the crew starts to wear thin.

In the ragtag fleet, Lee Adama becomes the Caprican delegate for the Quorum of Twelve (Battlestar Galactica), though the media's real attention is on the missing Demetrius, and its "classified military assignment". Lee is then paid a visit by Tom Zarek, who tells him that Roslin and Adama have continued to suppress information and believes the Demetrius affair will create more tension if Roslin doesn't come clean about its mission. He ends saying that he hopes, as a Quorum member, Lee will not ignore the truth, which he doesn't as he brings up another issue; Executive Order 112, which deals with the method by which the President establishes a tribunal and he believes it gives the President too much power. Roslin responds that she intended to discuss the order at the next Quorum meeting.

On Galactica, Crew Chief Galen Tyrol and Cally's relationship becomes even more strained. Cally soon attempts to spy on him, believing he is having an affair. She catches him talking to Tory Foster at Joe's bar. Afterward, she finds a note from Saul Tigh. She follows Tyrol again, where she eavesdrops on the meeting between Tyrol, Tory and Tigh. To her horror, she soon learns that they are Cylons. When the group breaks apart, Tory is the last one out of the compartment and notices an out of place tile, leading her to believe that someone listened in on their conversation. Cally rushes to her quarters to beat Tyrol back and when his guard is lowered, knocks him out with a wrench. Cally proceeds to grab her son Nicky, and attempts to commit murder-suicide by having her and her child vent into space in a launch tube. Tory follows and attempts to talk Cally into not doing it, since they had no idea they were Cylons until the Ionian Nebula, and that they are not evil. Eventually, Tory takes the baby and knocks Cally out. After she regains consciousness, Tory, holding the baby in another room, presses the launch button, venting Cally into space. Later, Admiral Adama gives Galen the bad news that Cally is dead.

== Cultural references ==
- The weapons locker where the final four members secretly meet is marked "1701D", which is the registry number of the Star Trek: The Next Generation era Starship Enterprise.
- When Six's fleet is ambushed by Cavil's, the Orion constellation (as seen from Earth) can be seen in the background stars (approximately at 28:22 minutes into the episode). Whether this was intentional and signifies something is unknown. It may also indicate that the Galactica crew, as well as the Cylons, are getting closer to the Sol System. The Orion, as well as other familiar constellations would be seen more frequently in the episodes that follow.

== Reception ==
Total viewership for "The Ties That Bind" mostly held steady from the previous week's new episode, "Six of One". The episode garnered 1.741 million viewers for a 1.1 household rating and 2 percent share, down just 60,000 viewers from the week before. In the important 18-to-49-year-old demographic, viewership fell by 12 percent to just 800,000 viewers (a 0.8 household rating and 3 percent share of this demographic). One source estimated that fewer than 500,000 additional viewers watch the show on DVRs, because the Nielsen rating estimates for DVR watching (calculated over the seven days following the episode's initial airing) do not count shows with fewer than 500,000 viewers.
