= Torn (Battlestar Galactica) =

- Battlestar Galactica episode
- Episode no.: Season 3 Episode 6
- Directed by: Jean de Segonzac
- Written by: Anne Cofell Saunders
- Original air date: November 3, 2006

Guest appearances
- Lucy Lawless as Number Three; Rick Worthy as Simon; Callum Keith Rennie as Leoben Conoy; Matthew Bennett as Number Five; Rekha Sharma as Tory Foster; Luciana Carro as Louanne "Kat" Katraine; Bodie Olmos as Hot Dog; Leah Cairns as Margaret "Racetrack" Edmondson; Emilie Ullerup as Julia Brynn; Madeline Parker as Kacey Brynn

Episode chronology
← Previous "Collaborators"	Next → "A Measure of Salvation"
- Battlestar Galactica season 3

"Torn" is the sixth episode of the third season from the science fiction television series Battlestar Galactica. The episode introduced the fictional concept of the "hybrid in the Battlestar Galactica" fictional universe - a semi-organic computer which operates the Basestar. The episode disclosed in the story that some Cylon (models including the number twos to which Leoben Conoy also belonged in the universe) believed hybrid to be speaking for the one true god in the show.

== Plot ==
After Starbuck crashes her Viper during a training exercise, Apollo strips her flight status. Colonel Saul Tigh mourns for his wife. He and Starbuck criticize the crew members who spent the occupation of New Caprica with the fleet until a disgusted Admiral William Adama orders them to stop. Starbuck cuts her hair and seeks out Kacey, whom she brushed off earlier. Tigh confines himself to his quarters and drinks heavily.

Lieutenant Felix Gaeta reconstructs Gaius Baltar's work on the location of Earth and determines that the fleet should navigate to a distant nebula shaped like a lion's head – Lion's Head Nebula. The pilots choose "Athena" as the new call sign for Sharon Agathon after she explains that "Boomer" refers to someone else.

Caprica Six and a Number Three copy tell Baltar that the Cylons plan to make Earth their new home. Hoping the Cylons will let him live, Baltar tells them about the Lion's Head Nebula.

In a conversation with Caprica Six, Baltar starts to question whether he himself is a Cylon. Caprica Six has told him in the past that there are only 12 Cylon models of which Baltar has only met 7 and he asks about the 5 models he has never met. Caprica Six declines to offer information and says "we don't talk about the other five", visibly distraught.

The Cylons send a basestar to scout the nebula but lose contact after a virus infects the ship and its crew. At Head Six's suggestion, Baltar volunteers to board the basestar so the Cylons can avoid exposure to the disease. A dying Six copy identifies an ancient beacon the crew found and brought aboard as the source of the sickness. She accuses Baltar of leading them to the nebula so they would find the infected beacon; Baltar kills her after she threatens to tell the others. Baltar omits mention of the beacon in his final report, but Caprica Six notices it in the photos he brought back.

The Cylons abandon the infected basestar. Later, Athena and Racetrack discover the basestar while scouting the nebula in a Raptor.

== Reception ==
Eric Goldman from IGN gave the episode a 9/10 saying that it continually delivered all dramatic and upsetting thrills that the show was known for.
