= A Measure of Salvation =

- Battlestar Galactica episode
- One of Galactica's prisoners, a Leoben Conoy model, lies dead in his holding cell.
- Episode no.: Season 3 Episode 7
- Directed by: Bill Eagles
- Written by: Michael Angeli
- Original air date: November 10, 2006

Guest appearances
- Lucy Lawless as Number Three; Rick Worthy as Simon; Callum Keith Rennie as Leoben Conoy; Matthew Bennett as Number Five; Luciana Carro as Louanne "Kat" Katraine; Donnelly Rhodes as Cottle; Bodie Olmos as Hot Dog; Leah Cairns as Margaret "Racetrack" Edmondson

Episode chronology
| ← Previous "Torn" | Next → "Hero" |
- Battlestar Galactica season 3

"A Measure of Salvation" is the seventh episode of the third season from the science fiction television series Battlestar Galactica.

== Plot ==
Major Apollo leads a boarding team inside the ship finding most of the Cylons are dead, however, a small group is found barely alive on the bridge. The landing team also finds the mysterious cylinder device. Sharon "Athena" Agathon tries to access the Basestar's computer system to no avail. She then speaks with a Cylon copy of herself who calls her a traitor. Apollo requests permission to finish off the Cylons. However, at Captain Helo's suggestion, Admiral Adama orders the prisoners to be brought back to Galactica for interrogation. Once they leave, the Basestar self-destructs.

Gaius Baltar is confronted by Number Three and Caprica-Six, who ask why he didn't reveal the existence of the device he found on the Basestar. Baltar feigns ignorance at first but then confesses that he did know about the device. Three and Six believe that he knows more about the device that he's letting on. They have two Centurions take him away for interrogation.

The Cylon prisoners, along with Apollo's boarding party, are placed under quarantine by Doctor Cottle. Later, he determines the virus to be a strain of Lymphocytic Encephalitis, one that has caused the Cylon's brains to swell and other symptoms like high fever, stupor, and disorientation.

Cottle reports to Adama and President Roslin that he can create a serum that will suppress the virus and keep the Cylons alive, without ever curing them; the Cylons will have to be given periodic injections to keep them alive. Athena proves to be immune thanks to antibodies inherited from her hybrid daughter Hera. A Cylon copy of Simon is brought before Adama and Roslin. In exchange for the serum, Simon explains the Cylons' plans to find Earth. He reveals that Baltar is with the Cylon fleet and is showing them the way to Earth. Simon further explains about the probe, and how the contaminated Basestar was abandoned by the rest of the Cylon fleet.

Apollo realizes that the human race now has a way to exterminate the Cylons once and for all. All they need do is execute their Cylon prisoners within range of a Cylon Resurrection Ship. Captain Helo objects to this plan, arguing that exterminating an entire race would be a "crime against humanity" and make the humans no better than the Cylons. Apollo argues that the Cylons are not human and they should be wiped out. Helo retorts saying that Sharon ("Athena"), his wife and a Galactica officer, has proved her loyalty, risking her neck time and again to help the human survivors and believes there may be more Cylons that think as she does.

Adama meets with Roslin on Colonial One to discuss the proposal to wipe out the Cylons. Roslin is in favor of the plan, but Adama is uneasy, pointing out that he needs a Presidential Order to use biological weapons. Roslin sees through this as Adama's way of "passing the buck", a point that Adama readily concedes. Roslin takes the responsibility, and orders Adama to carry out the plan to destroy the Cylons with the virus.

Baltar continues to be tortured by Number Three who demands he tell her what he knows. Gaius's mind, however, drifts in and out between the torture room and the beach with Six, who begins to have sex with him. In between intense pain and erotic pleasure, Baltar talks of religion and faith, a monologue that makes little sense to Three because Gaius is actually talking to the Six in his head. He tells Six he loves her but Three doesn't realize who he is talking to, and she ends the torture with a look of pity on her face.

Galactica jumps away from the Colonial fleet and appears in a location within the Cylons' detection range. A Cylon fleet, complete with Resurrection Ship, duly appears. Adama orders Apollo to execute the Cylon prisoners, but when Apollo arrives at their cell, he discovers that the Cylons are already dead. Adama immediately recalls Galactica's fighters and the Galactica jumps away.

The Cylons were in fact killed by Helo, who had secretly sabotaged the air handlers to remove the oxygen from their cell. Expecting to be arrested at any moment, Helo confesses his actions to Athena. He tells Athena that he believes he has made the right decision. However, the dreaded knock at the door of his quarters never comes.

Adama tells Roslin that the Cylons were killed before they had a chance to download to the Resurrection Ship, and that the plan to infect the Cylons with the virus has failed. Roslin believes there are only two possible suspects and asks what Adama is going to do about an investigation. Adama believes the device was a marker, and that they are definitely on the right track to finding Earth. Roslin agrees with this, but points out that if the humans are on the right track to Earth, then the Cylons must be too.

== Emmy Award consideration ==
James Callis submitted this episode for consideration in the category of "Outstanding Supporting Actor in a Drama Series" on his behalf for the 2007 Emmy Awards.
