= Battlestar Galactica: The Plan =

2009 television film directed by Edward James Olmos

- DVD cover
- Written by: Jane Espenson
- Directed by: Edward James Olmos
- Starring: Edward James Olmos; Dean Stockwell; Michael Trucco; Grace Park; Aaron Douglas; Michael Hogan; Callum Keith Rennie; Rick Worthy; Lymari Nadal; Tricia Helfer
- Composer: Bear McCreary
- Country of origin: United States
- Original language: English

Production
- Producers: David Eick; Jane Espenson; Ronald D. Moore; Harvey Frand; Ron E. French
- Cinematography: Stephen McNutt
- Editor: Andrew Seklir
- Running time: 112 minutes
- Production companies: David Eick Productions; NBC Universal Cable; Universal Studios Home Entertainment

Original release
- Network: Syfy
- Release: October 27, 2009

Battlestar Galactica: The Plan is a television film set in the reimagined version of the fictional Battlestar Galactica universe. It consists of newly filmed material as well as a compilation of footage from the 2003 miniseries and 2004 TV series.

The miniseries and first two seasons of Battlestar Galactica are retold with more emphasis on the Cylon perspective and their plan to wipe out the human race. The story follows two versions of the Cylon known as Cavil, one of whom admits they may have made a mistake, with the story being told in flashback. The "Final Five" Cylons are featured prominently.

The film premiered exclusively on DVD, Blu-ray Disc and digital download on October 27, 2009. It premiered on January 10, 2010, on Syfy, on April 2, 2010, on Sky Premiere in the United Kingdom, and on August 6, 2011, on Space in Canada.

== Plot ==
The opening scenes of The Plan occur just prior to the destruction of the Twelve Colonies in the televised miniseries Battlestar Galactica. Humanoid Cylon John Cavil is shown leading the planning for the genocidal attack on the human race. The seven known Cylons are present in the control room of the main Cylon base. Two versions of Cavil are shown in a Resurrection Ship, with the "Final Five" Cylons in stasis in resurrection chambers. The two versions of Cavil briefly discuss their plans for "teaching a lesson" to their creators, the Final Five. One version of Cavil announces his intention to witness the destruction of humanity on the ground. This version of Cavil travels to the planet Picon, where he encounters Ellen Tigh. Other characters from the series are also depicted: Gaius Baltar has a final meeting with Caprica Six; Samuel Anders is shown at his Pyramid team's training camp along with the team doctor, who is Number Four/Simon; and Tory Foster (Rekha Sharma) is shown driving to an airport.

The destruction of the Twelve Colonies is depicted in a series of new special effects shots, with the Cylon Hybrid narrating the destruction with oblique poetry. Almost all of the planets of the Twelve Colonies are depicted in short scenes. Ellen Tigh is severely wounded in the nuclear attack on Picon. Cavil helps her leave the planet aboard a Colonial Fleet rescue ship. Aboard a civilian transport, Cavil torments the half-conscious woman with descriptions of his intent to destroy humanity. Tory Foster survives the nuclear attack as well, but is wounded when her car flips over in the blast. Anders helps console his teammates in the mountainous region where they were training. Several scenes from the television miniseries were edited into The Plan.

Cavil later boards the Galactica, calling himself "Brother Cavil," and takes over the Galactica's chapel. The creation of Galactica's "wall of remembrance" is depicted, where survivors posted pictures and mementos of their dead or missing loved ones. Using religious fliers which talk about a "plan", Cavil covertly gathers the seven known Cylons. Cavil tells them that he intends to continue his plan to utterly destroy the human race. He also tells them that there is a sleeper agent aboard the Galactica, a Number Eight, whom he also plans to use.

Back on Cylon-occupied Caprica, Sam Anders and his teammates have fled their training center for safer quarters. They spot Cylon Centurions collecting the parts of their fallen comrades. Later, Sam and his companions launch their first attack on the Cylons, losing several people in an otherwise successful attack. Sam and Jean Barolay later observe several Number Fives burying numerous dead human bodies, realize that Cylons have taken humanoid form, and resolve to attack them. They do so later, while a Cavil version supervises the Fives' work. Cavil plays dead and survives the attack unharmed. Mistakenly believing Cavil to be a human being, Sam and his friends take the priest with them back to their camp. Cavil is clearly shocked to see Anders, because he is one of the original Final Five.

Back on the Galactica, the events of the first-season episodes unfold from the Cylons’ perspective. Brother Cavil triggers the original Cylon programming of the Number Eight known as Sharon "Boomer" Valerii. She plans a bombing of the ship's water storage facilities. As she tries to implement her plan, Boomer becomes increasingly distraught because she has fallen in love with Chief Galen Tyrol (Aaron Douglas). Cavil becomes angry when the Number Five known as Aaron Doral is exposed as a Cylon, and demands that he attempt to kill Commander Adama. The Number Two, meanwhile, listens in on Colonial Fleet communications, and becomes convinced that Kara "Starbuck" Thrace (Katee Sackhoff) holds some special purpose for the humanoid Cylons. He begins to paint the nebula depicted in Season Three episodes. Cavil, realizing that the Number Two known as Leoben Conoy has had his identity compromised, demands that the Number Two turn himself over to the humans and attempt to deceive or kill them. When Boomer's plan to deprive the Fleet of water fails (and Boomer helps the Galactica locate more water), Cavil demands that she kill Commander Adama. She first attempts suicide, and later purposefully botches the assassination attempt. Cavil, worried about Dr. Baltar's attempt to develop a Cylon detection machine, orders the Number Six known as Shelly Godfrey to frame Baltar for treason. She does so, but her attempt fails when her evidence is exposed as a sham by Lieutenant Gaeta. Cavil orders the Six into an airlock and kills her. Cally Henderson's assassination of Boomer is depicted as well. Cavil also orders the Number Four known as Simon to destroy the ship on which he lives with his family. Simon commits suicide rather than kill the family he has grown to love.

In the aftermath of Simon's suicide, Simon's wife Giana tries to convince everyone that he wasn't a Cylon. She seeks solace from Chief Tyrol, who is beginning to suspect that he himself might be a Cylon.

Meanwhile, back on Cylon-occupied Caprica, the other version of Cavil has ingratiated himself with Sam Anders. Cavil has ordered the Number Four to attempt to kill members of Sam's team, but none have died and Cavil criticizes the Four's actions. Starbuck returns to Caprica and meets the stranded Colonial pilot Karl "Helo" Agathon. Cavil makes a failed attempt to trick Sam into thinking they are Cylons and attacking them. Helo and Starbuck join them and attack a local Cylon base. Starbuck is wounded, taken captive by the Cylons, and subjected to various breeding experiments. Anders, Helo, and the others rescue her, discovering that Simon is a Cylon in the process. Later, Cavil tries to assassinate Starbuck and Anders but finds that he cannot pull the trigger, because he cannot stop thinking about Anders' comment that death wouldn't make him love these people any less. When the Cylon Centurions attack, Cavil is forced to hide with the rest of the humans. That night, Cavil meets with a Number Six who informs him that the Cylons have agreed to end their attacks on the human race. Cavil, who has changed his mind about humanity, agrees to pass on the message to the humans despite the fact that his model voted against the truce. Cavil returns to the human camp, and the humans leave the next day for the Galactica.

Meanwhile, the Brother Cavil on the Galactica is bedeviled by the repeated appearance of a young boy named John (Alex Ferris) in his chapel. Their various interactions finally end when the fake priest offers the boy an apple and then stabs him to death.

The Plan ends with "Caprica Cavil" arriving aboard the Galactica, and exposing himself and Brother Cavil as humanoid Cylons (as depicted in scenes from the second-season episode "Lay Down Your Burdens"). We realize from the Cylon perspective that he does this on purpose to stop Brother Cavil's plans.

Brother Cavil is brought to the brig protesting that he is not a Cylon until he sees Caprica Cavil already in the brig, at which point he stops pretending. Caprica Cavil announces that the Cylons have voted to give the humans "a reprieve" because they have decided that their attempts at genocide were an error. They have left the colonies and will stop hunting the humans (this scene differs from the same scene in "Lay Down Your Burdens, Part Two".)

Brother Cavil is in disbelief that the Cylons have decided to leave the humans alone, and continues to argue for their destruction. Caprica Cavil asserts that Brother Cavil does not understand the nature of love. He says that the Final Five loved humanity, and that Brother Cavil is jealous of this love. Brother Cavil, he claims, does not understand that God and the Final Five will love humanity even more if the human race is extinguished.

As they are escorted to the airlock, the Cavils see the Final Five Cylons watching them and admit this wasn't the reunion they had expected. The two Cavils are forced into the airlock where they argue their differing perspectives right up until the end. Brother Cavil announces that he intends to finish the destruction of the human race once he is resurrected, implying that he and John Cavil are one and the same and he intends to box Caprica Cavil to prevent him from spreading his ideologies to the rest of the Cylons. The two are ejected, and float out past the fleet. The film ends with this scene overlaid with John Cavil's fourth-season tirade lamenting his human-like body and desiring to be more like a machine so that he could "see gamma rays, hear x-rays, smell dark matter...and feel the solar wind of a super-nova" flowing over him.

== Cast ==
- Edward James Olmos as William Adama
- Dean Stockwell as Number One
- Michael Trucco as Samuel Anders
- Grace Park as Number Eight
- Michael Hogan as Saul Tigh
- Aaron Douglas as Galen Tyrol
- Callum Keith Rennie as Number Two
- Kate Vernon as Ellen Tigh
- Rick Worthy as Number Four
- Lymari Nadal as Giana O'Neill
- Matthew Bennett as Number Five
- Rekha Sharma as Tory Foster
- Tricia Helfer as Number Six
- Alisen Down as Jean Barolay
- Tiffany Lyndall-Knight as Hybrid
- Maya Washington as Sue-Shaun

== Production ==
The Plan was announced August 7, 2008 by Syfy as a two-hour Battlestar Galactica "special event" directed and written by series veterans Edward James Olmos and Jane Espenson. Production began September 8, 2008.

Edward James Olmos was reportedly a fan of Dean Stockwell's 1948 movie The Boy With Green Hair in which Stockwell plays a war orphan, and makes reference to it with a replica of Stockwell's costume worn by a war orphan named John. Olmos allegedly wanted the boy to have green hair too, but the studio wouldn't allow it

== Music ==
Bear McCreary returned to score The Plan. The score features ethnic instruments, similar to the score from the earlier seasons of the show, fitting with the time period the film is set in. It also features an original song "Apocalypse", which debuted at the Battlestar Galactica Orchestra's concerts at ComicCon 2009 – a melody designed as a counterpoint to a variation of the series' Gayatri mantra-Main Title (as performed during the end credits of The Plan).

== Reception ==
The review aggregation website Rotten Tomatoes reported an 83% approval rating based on 12 reviews. Peter Canavese of Groucho Reviews notes, "it's appropriate that the film should be about love" because that's why the Cylons call off the attack. Kevin Carr of 7M Pictures gave it 4 out of 5, praising the action, the effects, and the writing: "I found the movie to be a piece of brilliant writing because it managed to retrofit a neat little story arc into an existing series." Annalee Newitz of io9 was critical of the episode saying it "reveals The Cylons never actually had a plan" and although she was positive about some details that fans would enjoy, she said it was only for completists.
