= A Girl, Three Guys, and a Gun =

2001 film by Brent Florence

The Solid Ones A Girl, 3 Guys and a Gun A Girl, Three Guys and a Gun
- Directed by: Brent Florence
- Written by: Brent Florence
- Produced by: Brent Florence; Jim Florence; Lloyd A. Silverman
- Starring: Josh Holland; Tava Smiley; Michael Trucco; June Allyson; Natasha Henstridge
- Cinematography: Matthew W. Davis
- Edited by: Sam Bauer; Bryan Laszlo Bihari; Brent Florence; Noel Sterrett
- Production company: The Artists' Colony
- Distributed by: New Concorde Home Entertainment; Buena Vista Home Entertainment
- Release date: March 7, 2000 (Cinequest)
- Running time: 87 minutes
- Country: United States
- Language: English
- Budget: $1.4 million

A Girl, Three Guys, and a Gun, also known by its original title The Solid Ones, is a 2000 romantic comedy film written and directed by Brent Florence, who also stars in the picture. A festival acquisition executive-produced by Roger Corman, it is a low budget independent film with a cast consisting primarily of unknown actors, and representing June Allyson's final role in film. The project was filmed using Sony's HD-CAM format. Distribution was subsequently acquired by Disney and the film was released on video as A Girl, Three Guys, and a Gun (a.k.a. A Girl, 3 Guys and a Gun).

== Plot ==
Frank (Brent Florence) is a Northern California 20-year-old who has just been dumped by his girlfriend. He and his slacker buddies Joey (Kenny Luper) and Neil (Christian Leffler) want to escape their small town but lack the funds. To finance their escape, they rob the local bingo tournament, and although their haul is small, the three decide to go to the big city anyway. On the road, their car breaks down. They then take Hope (Tracy Zahoryin) and her boyfriend Dave (Josh Holland) as hostages. The group is being pursued by two bumbling cops.

== Cast ==
- Josh Holland as Dave
- Tava Smiley as Allysa
- Michael Trucco as Trevor
- June Allyson as Joey's Grandma
- Natasha Henstridge as 5 O'Clock Girl
- Kenny Luper as Joey
- Tracy Zahoryin as Hope
- Brent Florence as Frank
- Christian Leffler as Neil
- Robin Clark as Hellman
- John Lexing as Smith
- Dorothy Scott as Grandma Boyde
- Martin Veselich as Uncle Rick
- Doreen Lacey as Joey's Mom
- David Ashrow as Ed

== Reception ==
The film had its world premiere screening as The Solid Ones at Cinequest in March 2000 to a standing room only audience.

Following the Cinequest screening, Variety generally panned the film. While noting June Allyson's part in the project, and finding the film's technical aspects acceptable, they found the film's humor as quirky and lame, its otherwise serious themes feebly handled, and its leads as poor casting choices that failed to convince viewers as "local yokels". They wrote it was a "wan replay of the already derivative youthful-buddy-caper hijinx in indies like Bottle Rocket and Palookaville, Solid Ones offers tepid comedy and vague, touchy-feely dramatics, making for an inconsequential feature debut from writer-helmer-star Brent Florence. Like several preemed titles at San Jose Fest, pic suggests the hype about digitally shot pics will prove hollow so long as products come off like low-end direct-to-vid fodder".

DVD Talk granted that filmmaker "Brent Florence did his homework", due to the film being "just a bit more polished and streamlined than many of its ilk" but felt that the characters were not believable when writing they were "all transparent puppets for the scattershot screenplay, which wants to balance playfulness, danger, and sincerity, but fails with a disappointing consistency". Their acting was good but failed by being "in service of a half-baked plot, some fairly tired comedy schtick, and a handful of seriously over-familiar themes."

The film had its video premiere on 4 December 2001 under the title A Girl, Three Guys, and a Gun.

== Release ==
=== DVD ===
The DVD offers anamorphic widescreen, and while not perfect it is appreciated "to see a flick presented in its original form." The audio offered no extras but is "entirely listen-able."

DVD extras offer two audio commentaries, "one with the multi-hatted Brent Florence and music supervisor Todd Hannigan, and the other with Florence & Hannigan, cast members Kenny Luper & Christian Leffler, and "creative" component Bret Haley. Also included is a 7-minute outtake reel and a handful of trailers for A Girl, 3 Guys, and a Gun, Up Against Amanda, Raptor, and Hard as Nails."
