= List of Battlestar Galactica (2004 TV series) characters =

Promotional photo of the cast of Battlestar Galactica (2004). From left to right: Edward James Olmos as Adama, Mary McDonnell as Laura Roslin, Jamie Bamber as Lee, Katee Sackhoff as Kara, Tricia Helfer as Number Six, James Callis as Baltar and Grace Park as Number Eight.

Battlestar Galactica is a 2004 American military science fiction television series, and part of the Battlestar Galactica franchise. The show was developed by Ronald D. Moore and executive produced by Moore and David Eick as a re-imagining of the 1978 Battlestar Galactica television series created by Glen A. Larson. The pilot for the series first aired as a three-hour miniseries (comprising four broadcast hours in two parts) in December 2003 on Sci Fi, which was then followed by four regular seasons, ending its run on March 20, 2009.

Battlestar Galactica follows a group of human survivors fleeing the destruction of their homeworlds aboard the titular spacecraft, searching for a new home while being pursued by the Cylons, a fearsome society of robots intent on exterminating all humans. Biological models of Cylons, indistinguishable from humans, have infiltrated what remains of the human population, and their identities are revealed over the course of the series.

== Main cast ==
Performer	Character	Seasons			
Performer	Character	1	2	3	4
Credited during opening sequence
Edward James Olmos	William Adama	Main	Main	Main	Main
Mary McDonnell	Laura Roslin	Main	Main	Main	Main
Katee Sackhoff	Kara "Starbuck" Thrace	Main	Main	Main	Main
Jamie Bamber	Lee "Apollo" Adama	Main	Main	Main	Main
James Callis	Gaius Baltar	Main	Main	Main	Main
Tricia Helfer	Number Six	Main	Main	Main	Main
Grace Park	Sharon "Boomer" Valerii / Sharon "Athena" Agathon / Number Eight	Main	Main	Main	Main
Credited after opening sequence
Michael Hogan	Saul Tigh	Main	Main	Main	Main
Aaron Douglas	Galen Tyrol	Main	Main	Main	Main
Tahmoh Penikett	Karl "Helo" Agathon	Main	Main	Main	Main
Kandyse McClure	Anastasia Dualla	Main	Main	Main	Main
Paul Campbell	Billy Keikeya	Main	Main		
Alessandro Juliani	Felix Gaeta	Main	Main	Main	Main
Sam Witwer	Alex "Crashdown" Quartararo	Main	Guest		
Nicki Clyne	Cally Henderson	Recurring	Main (Note: Clyne appears in only one episode of season four, "The Ties That Bind".)	Main	Main
Michael Trucco	Samuel Anders		Recurring	Recurring	Main

== Main characters ==
=== William Adama ===
William Adama, portrayed by Edward James Olmos, is the commanding officer of the Battlestar Galactica and military leader of the Colonial Fleet of survivors after the Cylon attack on the Twelve Colonies. A veteran of the First Cylon War, during which his call sign was "Husker", Adama has the longest tenure as the highest-ranking officer in the Colonial Fleet after the Fall of the Twelve Colonies.

=== Laura Roslin ===
Laura Roslin, portrayed by Mary McDonnell, is the President of the Twelve Colonies. Serving as the Secretary of Education at the time of the Cylon attack, she is promoted to president with the deaths of everyone before her in the line of succession. Roslin becomes a religious figure to some in the Fleet, essential to the fulfillment of a prophecy that the refugees will find the mythical planet Earth.

=== Kara Thrace ===
Kara Thrace (call sign "Starbuck"), portrayed by Katee Sackhoff, is a gifted Viper pilot, with a volatile attitude that has hindered her career in the Colonial Fleet. However, William Adama has confidence in Thrace's military skills, and she greatly aids the Fleet inside and out of the cockpit.

=== Lee Adama ===
Lee Adama (call sign "Apollo"), portrayed by Jamie Bamber, is a former Colonial Fleet Reserve officer who is appointed Galactica's CAG (Commander of the Air Group) after the Cylon attack. The son of William Adama, Lee is a skilled Viper pilot.

=== Gaius Baltar ===
Dr. Gaius Baltar, portrayed by James Callis, is a brilliant scientist who unintentionally aids the Cylons in their attack on the Twelve Colonies. A charismatic genius and womanizer, he is initially portrayed as a self-serving opportunist, but becomes a braver and more caring character over the course of the series.

=== Number Six ===
Number Six, portrayed by Tricia Helfer, is a female humanoid Cylon model whose copies play several key roles in Cylon society. The copy dubbed "Caprica Six" is considered a hero for her infiltration of the defense systems of the Twelve Colonies, which facilitated the cataclysmic Cylon attack. Developing emotions and an affinity for humans, Caprica Six ultimately turns against other anti-human models and seeks peace between Cylons and humans. The Sixes are stunningly beautiful and typically use seduction as a tactic. They are deeply religious, and tend to feel sympathetic toward humans. Other prominent Six copies include Shelly Godfrey, Gina Inviere and Natalie Faust.

=== Number Eight ("Boomer" and "Athena") ===
Number Eight, portrayed by Grace Park, is a female humanoid Cylon model. Two prominent Number Eight copies serve at different times as Galactica pilots: Sharon Valerii, call sign "Boomer", and Sharon Agathon, call sign "Athena". Boomer is a sleeper agent and initially unaware she is a Cylon. She is loyal to Commander Adama but has been preprogrammed as a saboteur, and her true nature is only revealed when she attempts to assassinate him. Killed on the Galactica and resurrected among the Cylons, Boomer subsequently has trouble integrating with both humans and Cylons. She ultimately aligns herself with the anti-human faction of Cylon models led by John Cavil, opposing Athena and the other Eights. Athena poses as Sharon Valerii for an unsuspecting Karl Agathon to help him escape Caprica, and subsequently falls in love with him while trying to earn the trust of the Galactica crew. She becomes pregnant with the first viable hybrid human-Cylon child, and sides with the humans and sympathetic Cylons against the Cavil faction and Boomer.

=== Saul Tigh ===
Colonel Saul Tigh, portrayed by Michael Hogan, is Galactica's XO (Executive Officer) and William Adama's second-in-command. A gruff militarist with an alcohol problem, his relationship to civilians and those under his command is often strained. One of the leaders of the human Resistance against the Cylon occupation on New Caprica, he is jailed and tortured, which embitters him even more. In the season three finale "Crossroads", Tigh learns that he is one of the Final Five Cylons.

Nicholas Bigelow of Screen Rant called Tigh "a deeply flawed yet compelling character", noting that his transformation from a troubled man to a pivotal leader against the Cylons, and the life-altering revelation of his own Cylon nature, make him "a captivating study in imperfection". Screen Rant's Craig Elvy wrote that Tigh's best moment of character development in the series was the death of his troublesome wife Ellen at his hands, though it was later rendered "meaningless" by her resurrection.

=== Galen Tyrol ===
Galen Tyrol (often called "Chief"), portrayed by Aaron Douglas, is the Galactica's highest-ranking non-commissioned officer and in charge of maintenance of the Vipers and Raptors. He has a secret relationship with Lieutenant Sharon "Boomer" Valerii. The revelation of her true identity as a Cylon plunges him into crisis. Tyrol later marries and starts a family with Cally Henderson, though it is later revealed that she had had an affair with Brendan Constanza and the child is his. On New Caprica, he is union leader and later one of the leaders of the human Resistance against the Cylon occupation. In the season three finale "Crossroads", Tyrol learns that he is one of the Final Five Cylons.

Screen Rant wrote that Tyrol stands out thanks to "complex relationship with Sharon Valerii and his quest for redemption", which "highlights the show's theme of breaking the cycle."

=== Karl Agathon ===
Karl Agathon, portrayed by Tahmoh Penikett, is an Electronic Countermeasures Officer and has the call sign Helo, is part of a two-person Colonial Raptor crew based on the Battlestar Galactica, and is paired with Sharon "Boomer" Valerii before the Cylon destruction of the Twelve Colonies. Stranding himself on the devastated planet Caprica so that Dr. Gaius Baltar can be rescued, he is unaware that Sharon is a Cylon model known as Number Eight, and subsequently falls in love with another copy of Sharon.

=== Anastasia Dualla ===
Anastasia "Dee" Dualla, portrayed by Kandyse McClure, is a communications NCO working in the CIC on board the Battlestar Galactica. She begins dating President Laura Roslin's aide Billy Keikeya, but eventually cheats on him with Viper pilot Lee Adama. Billy sees them together and confronts Dee, soon after which they are among a group held hostage by terrorists. Billy intervenes when Dee is about to be executed, saving her life and sacrificing his own. Dee pursues her relationship with Lee, eventually marrying him when the Fleet settles in New Caprica. The marriage is tested by their conflicting political beliefs and Lee's affair with Kara Thrace, and they eventually separate. In the uncertainty after discovering the radiation-soaked former home of the colonies, she commits suicide.

=== Billy Keikeya ===
Billy Keikeya, portrayed by Paul Campbell, is Roslin's Chief of Staff after the Cylon attack, and is one of the few people she considers family. He dies in a shootout during a hostage situation on the luxury liner Cloud Nine in the season two episode "Sacrifice".

=== Felix Gaeta ===
Felix Gaeta, portrayed by Alessandro Juliani, serves as tactical officer on the Battlestar Galactica during the destruction of the Twelve Colonies and the ship's escape from the Cylons. When the human survivors settle on New Caprica, Gaeta becomes Chief of Staff to new President Gaius Baltar. After Baltar submits to the occupation of invading Cylons, Gaeta is perceived as a Cylon collaborator, but he is a spy for the Resistance. Gaeta is shown to be in a romantic gay relationship with Lieutenant Hoshi of the Pegasus in the web series Battlestar Galactica: The Face of the Enemy. After several Galactica crew members are revealed to be Cylons and having been betrayed by a Number Eight Cylon copy he trusted, Gaeta joins Tom Zarek in a mutiny attempt against Adama's leadership. Their plan is foiled, and Gaeta and Zarek are executed.

Gaeta is depicted as bisexual. Co-executive producer Jane Espenson said that Gaeta is completely "out" to his crew, but explains that they would not have that concept, as it is not an issue in their world. She defines him as "someone free of labels, who has probably had a number of relationships, mostly with males."

=== Alex "Crashdown" Quartararo ===
Alex Quartararo (call sign "Crashdown"), portrayed by Sam Witwer, is a Raptor Electronic Countermeasures Officer from the destroyed Battlestar Triton who joins the Galactica crew. A member of a three-Raptor survey party sent to examine the planet Kobol in "Kobol's Last Gleaming", Crashdown takes command of a small group when his Raptor is shot down. His inept and life-threatening leadership of the group ends when Baltar shoots him before he can shoot Cally in "Fragged".

=== Cally Henderson ===
Cally Henderson, portrayed by Nicki Clyne, is a Galactica deckhand. She and Tyrol marry and have a son, Nicholas. Upon learning that Tyrol is a Cylon, she attempts suicide with her child, but is stopped by Tory Foster, who then murders her and saves Nicholas. It is later revealed that she had had an affair with Brendan Constanza and the child is his.

=== Samuel Anders ===
Samuel Anders, portrayed by Michael Trucco, is a well-known athlete with the Caprica Buccaneers who forms a resistance group on Caprica with his teammates, where they are stranded after the Cylon attack. He is later a leader in the human Resistance against the Cylon occupation of New Caprica. He eventually trains as a Viper pilot with the call sign "Longshot". In the season three finale "Crossroads", Anders learns that he is one of the Final Five Cylons, ultimately becoming a Cylon Hybrid to guide the Galactica.

== Recurring ==
Performer	Character	Seasons			
Performer	Character	1	2	3	4
Callum Keith Rennie	Number Two / Leoben Conoy	Guest	Guest	Recurring	Recurring
Matthew Bennett	Number Five / Aaron Doral	Recurring	Guest	Recurring	Recurring
Richard Hatch	Tom Zarek	Guest	Recurring	Recurring	Recurring
Donnelly Rhodes	Sherman Cottle	Recurring	Recurring	Recurring	Recurring
Kate Vernon	Ellen Tigh	Guest	Recurring	Recurring	Recurring
Rick Worthy	Number Four / Simon O'Neill		Guest	Recurring	Recurring
Lucy Lawless	Number Three / D'Anna Biers		Guest	Recurring	Guest
Rekha Sharma	Tory Foster		Recurring	Recurring	Recurring
Dean Stockwell	Number One / John Cavil		Guest	Recurring	Recurring

=== Number Two (Leoben Conoy) ===
Leoben Conoy, portrayed by Callum Keith Rennie, is a male humanoid Cylon model. He is introduced in the 2003 miniseries as an arms dealer hiding at the Ragnar Anchorage munitions depot, where the Galactica has come to resupply itself. He and Adama are separated from the Galactica crew by an explosion, and Leoben begins to show signs of physical distress. Adama realizes that Leoben has been affected by the electromagnetic radiation flooding the station, which is known to be harmless to humans but disrupts the silica pathways of Cylons. Leoben confirms he is a Cylon and reveals the concept of their resurrection technology to Adama before attacking the commander. Adama bludgeons Leoben to death, and his body is taken aboard the Galactica for examination.

Another copy of Leoben is found hiding aboard the Gemenon Traveller and arrested in "Flesh and Bone". Though seemingly immune to interrogation tactics and physically capable of breaking his bonds, Leoben tells Kara Thrace that he has hidden a nuclear bomb somewhere in the fleet. He becomes increasingly obsessed with her, and knows not only her name but information from her past. Leoben tells Kara that she has a special destiny, and that the humans will find their original homeworld, Kobol, which will lead them to their fabled promised land, the planet Earth. Finally, he whispers to President Roslin that Commander Adama is a Cylon. Roslin has Leoben vented into space, but has Dr. Gaius Baltar secretly test Adama's blood in "Tigh Me Up, Tigh Me Down". In season two, a new copy of the Galactica Leoben seeks Kara's whereabouts on New Caprica as the Cylons invade in "Lay Down Your Burdens".

Kara is Leoben's prisoner in the season three premiere, "Occupation". She stabs and kills him the first chance he gets, but a resurrected copy later arrives at the apartment and reminds her that though she has killed him multiple times, he always comes back. In "Precipice", Leoben introduces Kara to Kacey Brynn, a child he claims is a Cylon-human hybrid bred by fertilizing eggs stolen from Kara by the Cylons. Kara is repulsed by the child and keeps her distance. But when Kacey is hurt, Kara worries at her hospital bedside with Leoben, and is relieved when the girl awakens. As the human Resistance overcomes the occupying Cylons in "Exodus", Kara tells an expectant Leoben "I love you" with a kiss, distracting him enough to kill him and take Kacey. Back on the Galactica, Kara is crushed when Kacey's real mother appears and claims her. The Leoben model is very religious, and in "Torn", is shown to believe that the words spoken by Cylon Hybrids, which control the functions of Cylon Basestars, come directly from God. In "Maelstrom", a spiritual guide appearing as Leoben takes Kara on a tour of her past and reminds her of her special destiny.

Leoben is identified as Cylon model Number Two in the season four episode "Six of One". As early as the occupation of New Caprica, the various humanoid Cylon models had begun to disagree on the best way forward for both the humans and the Cylon race. A clear schism erupts in "Six of One" when Cylon Raiders refuse to attack the Colonial Fleet because of the presence of at least one of the Final Five in the fleet. The Ones, Fours and Fives vote to "reconfigure" the Raiders to obey orders mindlessly, but the Twos side with the Sixes and Eights against this. In "The Road Less Traveled", Leoben takes a damaged Cylon ship and seeks out Kara, proposing an alliance between his faction of Cylons and the humans to destroy the Cylon Resurrection Hub and find Earth. He sells the idea to the leader of his faction, a Six named Natalie Faust, in "Faith", and they negotiate with Roslin in "Guess What's Coming to Dinner?". In "Revelations", Leoben encourages D'Anna Biers, the last remaining Three, to assist in finding the Final Five Cylons, which will benefit both the Cylons and the humans. A wary D'Anna reminds him that cooperation with the humans did not end well on New Caprica. Leoben is with Kara on devastated Earth when she discovers her own fatal Viper wreck, including her corpse, in "Sometimes a Great Notion". When the Galactica is overtaken by a mutiny, Roslin flees to a Cylon Basestar, and a Two helps her defeat the Battlestar's jamming signal so she can transmit a message to the entire fleet. When the surviving humans find and settle on the second, pristine Earth in the series finale "Daybreak", the remaining Twos, Sixes and Eights stay as well.

Screen Rant described Leoben as a "serious threat" to both Cylons and humans thanks to his "deceptive and manipulative skills", noting that at times he is "unsettling" and "deliciously twisted", and sets "a dark and mysterious tone" in the series.

=== Number Five (Aaron Doral) ===
Aaron Doral, portrayed by Matthew Bennett, is a male humanoid Cylon model. He is introduced in the 2003 miniseries as a public relations executive handling the Galactica's decommissioning to a museum. As the attacks on the Twelve Colonies commence, Doral bristles when then-Secretary of Education Roslin takes command of the starliner they are on, but is shut down by Lee Adama. Baltar discovers a Cylon tracking device on the Galactica and realizes there is a Cylon agent on board. Anxious to hide his own unwitting complicity in the attacks, and guided by Head Six, Baltar identifies a protesting Doral as the culprit. Unwilling to take a chance in their current situation, Colonel Tigh maroons Doral with basic rations at the Ragnar Anchorage munitions depot. Baltar is proven correct when Doral is rescued by a team of humanoid Cylons that includes Twos, Sixes and other Fives, as well as a single Eight. In "Litmus", a Doral copy boards the Galactica and commits a suicide bombing. This prompts Roslin to announce to the fleet that Cylons can now appear human, and distribute photos of the two known models, Leoben and Doral.

Doral is identified as Cylon model Number Five in the season two episode "Downloaded". The Fives serve a number of roles among the Cylons, and have an "everyman" appearance that helps them blend in with humans. They are generally anti-human, and considered inferior by the Cavils. The Dorals are "emotionally unstable and manipulative, switching from amiable and friendly to angry and violent." In "Six of One", the Fives side with the Ones and Fours and vote to reprogram disobedient Cylon Raiders, but are opposed by the Twos, Sixes and Eights. The last of the Fives all perish in the series finale "Daybreak" when the Cylon Colony falls into a black hole.

=== Tom Zarek ===
Tom Zarek, portrayed by Richard Hatch, is a political radical and a terrorist who found himself stuck on a prison ship when the Colonies were destroyed. Introduced in "Bastille Day", he leads a riot and later runs for political office, is elected vice-president and resists military domination of the civilian government. He combines the traits of an idealistic revolutionary and a self-serving politician.

=== Sherman Cottle ===
Dr. Sherman Cottle, portrayed by Donnelly Rhodes, is the Galactica's Chief Medical Officer, introduced in the season one episode "Act of Contrition".

=== Ellen Tigh ===
Ellen Tigh, portrayed by Kate Vernon, is the mercurial wife of Saul Tigh, who he believed was killed in the initial Cylon attack but appears alive on a rescue ship. Introduced in the season one episode "Tigh Me Up, Tigh Me Down", she is an attractive woman who unapologetically uses her sexuality to get what she wants for herself and her husband. In season three, the human settlement on New Caprica is living under occupation by the Cylons, and Ellen is forced to be an informant for a Cavil model Cylon to keep Saul safe. When he learns of her duplicity in "Exodus", a devastated Saul poisons her himself rather than allow his fellow Resistance members to exact their retribution on her. Saul, having learned he is one of the Final Five Cylons in the season three finale "Crossroads", realizes that Ellen is the last of the Final Five in the season four episode "Sometimes a Great Notion". Her resurrection, and the restoration of her memories as the creator of Cavil and the rest of the numbered model Cylons, is depicted in "No Exit".

=== Number Four (Simon O'Neill) ===
Simon O'Neill, portrayed by Rick Worthy, is a male humanoid Cylon model. He is introduced in "The Farm" as a physician who treats Kara for a gunshot wound in what is supposedly a Resistance hospital on devastated Caprica. He dismisses her suspicions that he is a Cylon, but inadvertently calls her "Starbuck". Kara is proven correct when she overhears him talking to a Six, and comes to understand they are performing fertility experiments on human women and she is next. Kara kills Simon and escapes, coming face to face with another copy who is promptly gunned down by her rescuers from the human Resistance.

The 2009 film The Plan depicts two more Simon copies. One is embedded among the humans as a medic on the Cybele, married to an aeronautical engineer named Giana with a daughter, Jemmy. One of the Cavils orders him to destroy the Cybele, refusing to spare even Simon's family. Simon loves them, and has become sympathetic to the humans, so rather than harm them he commits suicide via airlock without a Resurrection Ship nearby. Another copy is the former doctor of the Caprica Buccaneers, who now serves as the medic to the human Resistance group made up of the team's former players, including Sam Anders, fighting against the Cylon occupation of the planet. This Simon is covertly undermining the group by contaminating their anti-radiation meds and other sabotage. He is ultimately exposed when Anders and the others encounter and kill another Simon copy while saving Kara in "The Farm", and Jean Barolay is sent to kill him.

Simon is identified as Cylon model Number Four in the season four episode "Six of One". The Fours side with the Ones and Fives and vote to reprogram disobedient Cylon Raiders, but are opposed by the Twos, Sixes and Eights. The Fours are medical specialists and the most machine-like of the Cylons, employing logic and reason paired with a lack of emotional response. Screen Rant called Simon a compelling and tragic character who is "fundamentally good despite serving a wicked master."

=== Number Three (D'Anna Biers) ===
D'Anna Biers, portrayed by Lucy Lawless, is a female humanoid Cylon model. A reporter for the Fleet News Service, D'Anna comes aboard the Galactica in the season two episode "Final Cut" to investigate her suspicions of a military cover-up surrounding recent civilian deaths aboard the Gideon. President Roslin and Commander Adama grant her full access, believing that D'Anna will discover that military personnel deal with the same pressures and fears as the rest of the fleet, and that the events were a tragic mistake. She does just that, and documents the successful defense against a sudden attack by Cylon Raiders. D'Anna's glowing report is broadcast to the entire fleet, but is also viewed by copies of Cylon models Six, Sharon and Doral, its transmission made possible by the staged Raider attack. The presentation also includes secret footage showing that Sharon Agathon, a known Cylon, is alive and pregnant. The fourth Cylon in the group is revealed to be a copy of D'Anna.

"The duality of my role is very fun to play as an actor because she is saying one thing, she looks like a friend, but there is something cold about her. I’ve been reading a book called The Fantasy Bond and it talks about cold mothers who may have physical proximity but no warmth towards their child. There is something about that which is one of the most malignant types of mother love there is. I kind of wanted an element of that in this woman, which is why on some level she is really creepy."

— Lucy Lawless on D'Anna in "Downloaded"

In "Downloaded", a D'Anna debriefs newly resurrected Cylons Caprica Six and Sharon "Boomer" Valerii, who are now considered heroes among the Cylon. Identifying her Cylon model as Number Three, D'Anna quickly realizes that Six and Boomer's experiences have made them more sympathetic to humans, and their celebrity creates the dangerous possibility that they could influence other Cylons. Six and Boomer realize that D'Anna has manipulated them to behave so that "boxing", or deactivating, them is justified. They prevent D'Anna from killing human Resistance fighter Sam Anders under the pretense that he should be interrogated, but ultimately Six has to kill this copy of D'Anna to save his life. Six and Boomer determine it will be 36 hours before this D'Anna is resurrected, giving them time to speak out publicly against the continued persecution of the human race.

In season three, D'Anna is one of the Cylons overseeing the Cylon occupation of the human settlement on New Caprica. She begins having dreams that trigger a crisis of faith in "Exodus", which leads to the discovery that the half-human, half-Cylon child Hera Agathon is still alive. D'Anna, Caprica Six and Baltar flee with Hera. D'Anna later tortures Baltar in "A Measure of Salvation", believing he is hiding information about a virus that is killing Cylons. D'Anna is in a sexual relationship with Baltar and Six in "Hero", but her dreams are intensifying. She commands a Cylon Centurion to kill her so that she may resurrect, and during the process sees "something so beautiful between life and death". In "The Passage", Baltar discovers that D'Anna has been committing suicide and resurrecting over and over, trying to learn the identities of the Final Five Cylons, which is forbidden. In "Rapture", the humans and Cylons descend on the Temple of Five, believed to hold both the secret to Earth's location and clues to the Final Five's identities. Cavil attempts to kill D'Anna to stop her from learning the truth, but Baltar kills him instead. The supernova of a local star activates a crystal vision mechanism that shows D'Anna the identities of the Final Five, but she dies before she can tell Baltar what she saw. Reawakening on a Resurrection Ship, D'Anna is told by Cavil that her messianic tendencies have shown her to be flawed, so her model will be boxed.

Subsequently in season four, a schism erupts among the Cylon models which pits the Ones, Fours and Fives against the Twos, Sixes and Eights. Cavil unboxes D'Anna in "The Hub", hoping she can negotiate a truce with the opposing faction, who have made an alliance with the humans and intend to destroy the Cylon Resurrection Hub. Ever defiant, D'Anna kills Cavil, and allows Karl Agathon to "rescue" her from the Hub, after which the humans and rebel Cylons destroy it with a nuclear strike. D'Anna reluctantly joins the human-Cylon joint venture to find the Final Five, who they believe know the way to Earth. However, as the last of the Threes, she refuses to tell Roslin what she knows until she feels safe. D'Anna remains wary in "Revelations", concerned for the Five's safety if she reveals them. Leoben recommends cooperation, but she reminds him that cooperation with the humans did not end well on New Caprica. D'Anna subsequently threatens to execute Roslin and her entourage on the Cylon Basestar unless Adama hands over the four newly identified final Cylons on the Galactica. Tory Foster reveals herself as one of them and joins D'Anna, and Adama, in turn, threatens to vent the remaining three Cylons into space. With moments to spare, Kara reveals that she knows the way to Earth. The humans and Cylons go there together, but find the planet devastated and radioactive. In "Sometimes a Great Notion", the humans and Cylons leave to find a new habitable planet, but D'Anna decides to stay on Earth and die with her ancestors, ending the cycle of death and rebirth.

The Number Threes are depicted as "calculating and duplicitous", and known to manipulate both humans and other Cylons as necessary. Screen Rant wrote "What makes [D'Anna] stand out is her sheer force of will, which continues to transcend allegiances and loyalty throughout the entire series. While she was generally loyal to the Cylons, her obsession with unveiling the Final Five and understanding the truth behind the Cylon-Human conflict leads her to take extreme measures to meet her goals."

=== Tory Foster ===
Tory Foster, portrayed by Rekha Sharma, is introduced in the season two episode "The Captain's Hand" as President Laura Roslin's new aide, in the wake of Billy Keikeya's death. In the season three finale "Crossroads", Tory learns that she is one of the Final Five Cylons. Unlike Tigh, Tyrol and Anders, the revelation is liberating for Tory, and she is quick to align herself with the rebel Cylon factions who seek an alliance with the humans. In "The Ties That Bind", Tyrol's already-overwrought wife Cally learns that he and the others are Cylons, and attempts to vent herself and their son Nicky into space. Tory manages to talk her out of it, but once she has Nicky in hand, she vents Cally out of the airlock to prevent her from revealing their secret. In the series finale "Daybreak", Tyrol learns that Tory murdered Cally, and breaks Tory's neck.

=== Number One (John Cavil) ===
John Cavil, portrayed by Dean Stockwell, is a male humanoid Cylon model. Introduced in the season two finale "Lay Down Your Burdens" as a religious counselor aiding Galen Tyrol, he is revealed as a Cylon when Tyrol spots a duplicate Cavil among a newly-arrived group of refugees from Caprica. The Number Ones possess an exceptional disgust for humans, advocating that they be culled down to near extinction. Cavil also has little respect for other Cylon models, including the Final Five who created him, and freely manipulates, reprograms and even decommissions them as needed to further his goals. Cavil is identified as Cylon model Number One in the season four episode "Six of One".

=== Other characters ===
- Captain Aaron Kelly, played by Ty Olsson, is the LSO (Landing Signal Officer) of the Galactica, serving directly under Colonel Saul Tigh.
- Brendan Costanza ("Hot Dog"), played by Bodie Olmos, is a Viper pilot on Galactica.
- James Lyman ("Jammer"), played by Dominic Zamprogna, is a deckhand working under Galen Tyrol on Galactica in seasons one and two. In the 2006 web series The Resistance, Jammer is a member of the human Resistance against the Cylon occupation of New Caprica, but is shaken by the deaths of ten people at the hands of the Cylons in retaliation for Resistance activity. He is picked up and questioned by a Number Five Cylon model, who suggests Jammer become an informant to keep the Resistance from further damaging the fragile peace between humans and Cylons, and save human lives. Jammer balks at the idea. In season three, he has joined the New Caprica Police, ostensibly a buffer between the humans and Cylons, but functionally forced to do the Cylons' bidding. Jammer soon finds himself in over his head, as escalating strikes against the Cylons by the Resistance trigger escalating crackdowns on the populace by the Cylons. A masked Jammer helps Cally Henderson escape execution in "Precipice", and defends a fleeing President Roslin in "Exodus". In "Collaborators", Jammer is brought before a secret tribunal called The Circle, which sentences him to death for treason for his actions as part of the NCP. He begs Circle member Tyrol for mercy for saving Cally, but Tigh reasons that he has caused too many deaths and Jammer is executed via airlock. Cally is later unable to confirm for a guilt-ridden Tyrol that Jammer was the man who saved her. Writer Ronald D. Moore specifically focused "Precipice" on Jammer's role within the NCP as a means of personalizing someone working for the police force, in contrast to the focus on the Resistance in the previous episode, "Occupation".
- Tucker Clellan ("Duck"), played by Christian Tessier, is a Colonial Viper pilot aboard the Battlestar Galactica. Introduced in the season two "Flight of the Phoenix", he is also a central character in the web series The Resistance. After the killing of his wife, Nora, by Cylons, Duck joins the Resistance on New Caprica. He later dies as a suicide bomber in the season three episode "Occupation".
- Jean Barolay, played by Alisen Down, is a player for the Caprica Buccaneers who, like her teammate Sam Anders, becomes part of a Resistance force against the Cylons when they devastate and occupy Caprica.
- Charlie Connor, played by Ryan Robbins, is a member of the Resistance on New Caprica, later part of "The Circle", who secretly execute 13 collaborators, including Jammer. Robbins also plays the Armistice Officer, Boxey's father, in the 2003 miniseries.
- Louanne Katraine ("Kat") is a Colonial Viper pilot serving aboard Galactica. She was a former smuggler who took the identity of a dead girl, hoping to redeem herself following the attack. She and Starbuck become rivals, and the two frequently butt heads, developing a love-hate relationship. Following several near-death experiences, Kat becomes addicted to drugs she had been taking to deal with the stress, though she quits after nearly crashing her Viper while under the influence. She dies from severe radiation poisoning sustained while guiding several civilian ships out of a highly radioactive area. Played by Luciana Carro, Kat appeared in 18 episodes.
- Romo Lampkin is a defense attorney, traveling on one of the civilian ships. He is called on, at different times, to defend Lee Adama and Gaius Baltar. Becomes President of the Twelve Colonies Of Kobol in the final episode, before the final survivors choose to scatter across the second Earth. Portrayed by Mark Sheppard, Lampkin appears in seven episodes.
- Maya is chosen as the adoptive human mother of Hera Agathon, though she is not told who the baby is. Played by Erica Cerra, Maya appears in four episodes.
- Noel Allison ("Narcho") is a senior Viper pilot on the Battlestar Pegasus who later transfers to Galactica, played by Sebastian Spence. He appears in nine episodes.
- Gage is a Specialist serving on the Battlestar Pegasus, and later on Galactica, played by Mike Dopud. He appears in four episodes and serves in Gaeta's mutiny.
- Peter Laird is a civilian aeronautical engineer pressed into service on the Battlestar Pegasus by order of Admiral Helena Cain after the Cylon attack on the Twelve Colonies, played by Vincent Gale. He appears in six episodes and is killed by Tom Zarek during Gaeta's mutiny.

== Guest ==
- Boxey, portrayed by Connor Widdows, is a young boy who escapes the destruction of Caprica by the Cylons. He is the son of the Armistice Officer at Armistice Station, the first casualty of the attack. The character was intended to appear in multiple episodes of the series, but Widdows's additional scenes were cut.
- Admiral Helena Cain, portrayed by Michelle Forbes, is the first commanding officer of the Battlestar Pegasus, introduced in the season two episode "Pegasus". Following the destruction of the Colonies, Cain had become unhinged, and committed numerous war crimes. Though the Galactica had been believed to be the last surviving Battlestar, when the Pegasus reappears, Cain takes control of the fleet as Adama's superior officer. She is dissatisfied with how Adama has been managing it, which causes friction between her, Adama and Roslin. Cain is shot and killed in "Resurrection Ship" by Gina Inviere, a Cylon Number Six whom Cain had tortured for months. The character later appears, again played by Forbes, in the 2007 television film Battlestar Galactica: Razor.
- Zak Adama, played by Clarke Hudson in the miniseries and by Tobias Mehler in the main series, is the younger son of William Adama, a Viper pilot killed in his first solo flight some time prior to the Cylon attacks. Was in a relationship with, and became engaged to, Kara Thrace during his time at flight school; Kara was in fact his flight instructor. Lee's belief that Zak flew before he was ready due to pressure to please their father damaged Lee and Adama's relationship. However, in the season 1 episode "Act of Contrition" Starbuck reveals to the two that Zak failed Basic Flight but she passed him nonetheless due to her feelings for him.
- Daniel Novacek ("Bulldog"), portrayed by Carl Lumbly, is a pilot who served under Commander William Adama aboard the Battlestar Valkyrie who lost while on a stealth mission across the Armistice Line approximately six years before the Fall of the Twelve Colonies. Bulldog reappears in the season three episode "Hero", having been a captive of the Cylons.
- Emily Kowalski, portrayed by Nana Visitor, is a terminal cancer patient befriended by Laura Roslin in the season four episode "Faith".
- Number Seven (Daniel) is a male humanoid Cylon model mentioned, but never depicted, in the series. In the season four episode "No Exit", the last of the Final Five Cylons, Ellen Tigh, has been resurrected, and her memories as the creator of the numbered model Cylons have been restored. It is explained that the Daniels had been artistic and sensitive, and close with Ellen. A jealous Cavil sabotaged the genetics of the entire line of Sevens so that no more could be created, and then murdered the living copies.
- Sue-Shaun is a member of Samuel Anders's resistance group on Caprica and a former Caprica Buccaneer. She is mercy-killed by Starbuck at her own request after becoming an unwilling test subject of the Cylons' fertility experiments. Played by Tamara Lashley, Sue-Shaun appears in three episodes.
- Alastair Thorne is an officer aboard the Pegasus known as the "Cylon Interregator", played by Fulvio Cecere. He appears in two episodes.
- Barry Garner is the third commanding officer of Pegasus. Before his promotion, he was the ship's chief engineer, played by John Heard. He appears in one episode and suffocates while fixing the Pegasus FTL drive.
- Cole "Stinger" Taylor is the CAG of the Pegasus serving under Admiral Helena Cain. Played by John Pyper-Ferguson. He appears in two episodes.
- Jack Fisk was the Pegasus' second officer at the time of the attacks. A Lieutenant-Colonel, he is promoted to Colonel upon assuming Belzen's duties as XO, and later serves as interim CO of the Pegasus after the murder of Helena Cain before being murdered himself. Portrayed by Graham Beckel.
- Mel "Freaker" Firelli is an officer on Pegasus. Played by P.J. Prinsloo. He appears in two episodes.
- Vireem is a Specialist serving on the Pegasus and later on Galactica, played by Derek Delost. He appears in three episodes and serves in Gaeta's mutiny.
- The First Hybrid is the precursor to the modern Cylon Hybrids, and is the first step in their evolution from pure machines to organic beings. Only appears in the two-hour television movie Razor, played by Campbell Lane.
- Hera Agathon is the first successful Human/Cylon natural born child. She is the daughter of Karl "Helo" Agathon and Sharon (Number 8) "Athena". Played in different episodes by child actors Lily Duong-Walton, Alexandra Thomas and Iliana Gomez-Martinez.
