= John Cavil =

Character in Battlestar Galactica (2004)

John Cavil Number One
- Battlestar Galactica character
- Two copies of the Cavil model
- First appearance: "Lay Down Your Burdens" (Part 1) (2006)
- Last appearance: Battlestar Galactica: The Plan (2009)
- Portrayed by: Dean Stockwell

In-universe information
- Species: Humanoid Cylon
- Gender: Male
- Affiliation: Cylons

John Cavil (Number One) is a fictional character and the main antagonist from the re-imagined Battlestar Galactica television series. He is portrayed by Dean Stockwell. In the fourth-season episode "Six of One", Cavil's model number was revealed as Number One.

== Role in the series ==
=== Background ===
John Cavil, also known as Number One, is a humanoid Cylon model that appears as a highly rational, eccentric man in his late-sixties. The Cavils have a heavy sarcastic demeanor and a sense of humor. They take neither religion nor death seriously and are the only atheist Cylon model. A Cavil is first seen aboard the Galactica assuming the role of a priest, offering spiritual guidance, and going by the name "Brother Cavil". A unique characteristic of the Cavils is the sadistic, cruel and Machiavellian streak in their personalities. The Cavils openly mock their fellow Cylons every time they attempt contact with humans, even when it is necessary.

Even though they view death as a nuisance, the Cavils are extremely displeased with pain (placing the blame on the Final Five). This view fuels the idea that the Cavils wanted death to the humans to be as quick as possible but were unprepared for the aftermath. Their attitude towards human mortality, rather than irrational hatred, derives from their ignorance about death and its consequences. As revealed on Battlestar Galactica: The Plan, the Cavil that was stationed in Caprica learned from Samuel Anders the motives for the resistance; that humans do not leave anyone behind, even their dead. Respecting their resilience, the Caprica Cavil agrees with Caprica Six and Sharon Valerii (Boomer) to abandon the Colonies. Disappointed with the other Cylon models after failing to accomplish anything through boycott and sabotage, the Galactica Cavil fails to learn any lesson. As they are discovered and airlocked from Galactica, Galactica Cavil swears to "box" Caprica Cavil for his insubordination and is indicated to be the same Cavil that is the main enemy of season four, given his plans to destroy humanity once and for all when he resurrects.

It is later implied in the series that the Cavils, akin to their creators, lack superhuman strength and are the least able to defend themselves. It is also implied that the Cavil who led the Civil War and who killed himself in the CIC when he realized he was losing and had no chance of winning, is the resurrected Galactica Cavil. Like the Simons and Number Threes and in contrast to Leobens, Dorals, Number Sixes and Number Eights, Cavils appear to be rare and seldom appear in large groups, though in the third-season episode "Rapture" a large number were seen presumably taking care of the boxing of the three line of Cylons.

The Cavils' superior awareness of all situations (attributable to their being the only human model Cylon with full knowledge of their origin) and uncanny manipulative traits make their series the de facto leaders of the Cylons. Their vast superiority and manipulations over their fellow Cylons goes beyond comprehension, as they manage to annihilate the Twelve Colonies, repeatedly attack the survivors without hurting the Final Five and ensure their survival only to make them 'the ones who suffer the most', carrying on with the annihilation of billions only to teach their creators a lesson.

A comment made by Sharon "Boomer" Valerii indicates the Cavils are against the idea of the Cylons reproducing biologically, which makes sense given their distaste for human traits as well as lack of faith in the Cylon god, whose commandments include, "Be fruitful". Ellen Tigh's observation that the only hope for the future of the Cylon race might be 'messy biological reproduction' is too much for Cavil.

Cavil is insistent the Cylons not seek out or discuss the Final Five models and tries to prevent D'Anna from learning their identities, even threatening her at gunpoint in "Rapture". After she sees their faces, he boxes her before she can tell anyone, while claiming support from the other Cylons. The reason is he knows the identities of the Final Five and doesn't want them exposed (he's waiting until they've learned their "lesson").

=== Character biography ===
Two versions of Cavil appear at the end of the second season – in the two-part episode "Lay Down Your Burdens." His first appearance is as a religious counselor provided by the fleet, with whom Chief Tyrol meets after he physically attacks deck hand Cally Henderson when she awakens him from a recurring nightmare. Tyrol states he dreams of killing himself, and Cavil suggests Tyrol subconsciously believes he is a Cylon sleeper agent like his former girlfriend Sharon "Boomer" Valerii.

Cavil assures Tyrol he is no Cylon, joking "I've never seen you at any of the [Cylon] meetings." Despite posing as a priest, Cavil is critical of the Lords of Kobol, telling Tyrol praying to them will not help. Cavil states humans have been given the choice to decide their own destinies, and the Lords play no part in their affairs. Cavil later meets with President Laura Roslin, and offers prayers to the Lords of Kobol for Roslin's success in her presidential campaign against Gaius Baltar.

A second version of Cavil appears among the survivors from Caprica after Kara "Starbuck" Thrace leads a rescue mission to the planet. During a Cylon attack, the Cylons suddenly cease fire and withdraw. The Cavil among the group announces the Cylons have left Caprica, and that the group has been spared. Upon their return to the fleet, Chief Tyrol spots the second Cavil disembarking from a Raptor, and alerts the guards he is a Cylon. Caprica Cavil admits to being a Cylon with a message for their leader. Admiral Adama has the man taken to the brig. Meanwhile, Galactica Cavil is arrested, and emphatically protests his innocence until he sees another copy of himself in the brig. He simply says "Oh, well...okay then," and calmly enters the cell.

Caprica Cavil gives a message to Roslin, stating the Cylon attack on the Colonies, as well as pursuit of the fleet, was an error. Cavil further explains two Cylon heroes, the Number Six model known as Caprica Six and Number Eight (that version of Sharon "Boomer" Valerii that was stationed on Galactica and shot Admiral Adama), have convinced them the war is futile. He states though the Cylons are machines, they strive to be the best machines possible, and believe they will one day rise above their creators. Their first step had been to replace the humans, and they believed they could do this by hijacking their lives and taking their places. They have determined, however, they have become no better than the creators they despise, and offer a reprieve from the genocide, suggesting that human and Cylon go their separate ways.

Adama and Roslin furiously reject the idea, stating they simply cannot walk away after the Cylons have destroyed their home worlds. Adama asks the two Cavils whether the new plan comes from their God, and Cavil says "there is no God. Supernatural divinities are the primitive's answer to why the sun goes down at night...or at least that's what we've been telling the others for years," although he acknowledges neither position can be proven. Despite the apparent sincerity of the message, and the offer of truce, Roslin orders both Cavils to be airlocked, suggesting they will rapidly discover whether or not God exists. The actual disposal through the airlock is not shown on screen, but is shown in the film The Plan. Galactica Cavil reveals that there is a Resurrection Ship nearby and, given his comments, his resurrected self is likely the one that leads the Civil War.

At least two Cavil versions are present on planet New Caprica during the Cylon occupation. The New Caprica Cavils display particularly venomous anti-human sentiments, taking great pleasure in taunting human prisoners and shrugging off the human casualties of insurgent suicide bombings. One Cavil in particular takes pleasure in blackmailing Ellen Tigh for sexual favors in exchange for releasing her husband Saul from captivity and not killing him. Saul Tigh is eventually released, having lost his right eye.

Later in the season, Cavil is one of three Cylons to board Galactica to meet with William Adama and Laura Roslin about the Eye of Jupiter artifact. He is willing to hand Gaius Baltar over to the humans as part of a deal for the relic, "to sweeten the pot." Upon returning to his Basestar, Cavil feels that the annihilation of Galactica is the best option, given the standoff, because Cylons are machines, and can wait out the human fleet.

In "Rapture", Cavil finds D'Anna in the temple on the Algae Planet, and, realizing she has come to discover the identities of the Final Five, he orders her at gunpoint not to proceed any further. However, Baltar shoots him from behind, and D'Anna finally sees their faces, but she loses consciousness and dies shortly thereafter.

Cavil is present as D'Anna resurrects. He states all members of her line, the Number Threes are fundamentally flawed, and suffer from messianic delusions. He claims he and the other Cylon models agree the Number Threes must all be "boxed" – deactivated, with their memories placed into cold storage. The boxing is carried out by Cavil.

Cavil takes a major role in Season Four, as the leader and head negotiator of one of the two warring Cylon factions. In "Six of One," Natalie, the leader of the opposing faction, demands he stop lobotomizing the Raiders, and reveals that she has restored free will to the Centurions. The Centurions then slaughter Cavil and the other Cylons in the room.

Cavil resurrects in "The Ties That Bind," and claims that, although he does not agree with Natalie and her followers, he will respect their wishes. The Number Twos, Number Sixes and Number Eights (except Boomer) demand the Threes be unboxed to end the deadlock. Cavil seemingly acquiesces but, in reality, sets a trap to destroy Natalie and her followers. Boomer starts to have second thoughts about going against her fellow Eights. However, Cavil, who has developed a relationship with her, encourages her to embrace her true nature as a machine, and abandon her emotions.

Natalie survives the attack, and a civil war ensues. D'Anna is unboxed by Cavil in "The Hub". Cavil hopes she will be able to mediate peace between the warring Cylon factions, but she kills him and escapes with Helo and a Number Eight.

In "No Exit", it is revealed Ellen Tigh was involved in the creation of Cavil, modelling him after the image of her own father, John. Cavil was the first of a new generation of Cylons, and he assisted in the creation of models Two to Eight. Because Ellen Tigh favored the Number Seven (Daniel) model, Cavil's jealousy grew and he had the entire line destroyed by tampering with the amniotic fluid housing the Daniel copies. Cavil was also responsible for the Final Five being banished to live as humans. His rage fueled in part by the Final Five condemning him to an existence complete with all of humanity's weaknesses, and realizing the Five would try to avert another war against the humans, he killed them and when they resurrected, he erased their memories and left them among the humans so they could witness the eventual genocide of the human race. Cavil manipulated his "parents", the Final Five, to be among those who suffered the most.

It was also speculated (although never explicitly stated) Cavil was the one who programmed models Two to Eight not to seek out or discuss the Final Five. This theory has been confirmed in an interview with writer Ryan Mottesheard:

John/Cavil is the only one who knows the Final Five because he corrupted the programming of the other six models to never speak of the Final Five or search for their identities. Obviously, if they did, then his little house of cards topples, which is why he boxed D'Anna.

After Ellen Tigh is poisoned by her husband, she resurrects aboard one of Cavil's ships and is held prisoner there for 18 months (No Exit). In the process of downloading to a new body, Ellen regains the memories Cavil had erased. Later, when the Cylons' resurrection capability is destroyed, Cavil attempts to acquire Ellen's knowledge of the technology (she and the other Final Five being the ones who developed the ability to resurrect). Cavil plans to kill Ellen and recover the information from her brain. Boomer seemingly rebels against him and helps Ellen escape. It is later revealed, however, Ellen's escape was orchestrated by Cavil to sneak Boomer onto Galactica in order to kidnap Hera Agathon.

It is stated by Ellen in No Exit that Cavil is a sadist who enjoys playing mind games with the Final Five as evidenced by him taking Galen Tyrol's confession, a copy following Sam Anders in the resistance, torturing Tigh on New Caprica as well as extorting Ellen for sexual favors. He is also responsible for her being placed on a ship as it was leaving a destroyed Colony as part of his manipulations of the Final Five.

Cavil fully embraces his identity as a machine and believes humans are inherently lesser than Cylons, dismissing Ellen's arguments that humans, for all their imperfections, have something real and precious: Love, compassion, creativity, emotion.

The character of Cavil has echoes of the story of Oedipus. Alan Sepinwall of The Star-Ledger sees Cavil as "a cruel hybrid of the Biblical Cain (he murdered his brother, and his mother is fond of apples), Oedipus (has sex with his mother, though the eye he puts out belongs to his father) and a kind of Pinocchio in reverse."

Cavil wants Hera, as he sees her as the only chance for the Cylon race to continue, following the destruction of Resurrection. After Boomer helps Hera escape, Cavil personally leads a boarding party onto Galactica to retrieve her. In Galactica's CIC, Cavil is captured, while a Simon and Doral with him are killed by the bridge crew. Cavil takes advantage of an explosion to take a gun from a Colonial Marine guard, after knocking him down, and takes Hera hostage. Baltar lowers his side arm, and tries to convince Cavil to end the cycle of violence, and end the standoff on the bridge. Cavil begins to waver from Baltar's speech, but he refuses – without Hera, he believes his race will end.

Tigh offers Cavil Resurrection technology if he releases Hera and stops pursuing humanity. Cavil agrees, and calls off his troops, saying he's a man of his word. Cavil becomes impatient, and sarcastically tells the Final Five Cylons to "hurry up" their discussions, as they are "keeping two civilizations waiting." As the Final Five come together to generate the data necessary for Resurrection technology, Tyrol, discovering Tory was responsible for the death of his wife Cally, breaks the link and kills her. Cavil realizes that, since each of the Final Five possessed part of the secret to Resurrection, that in killing one, then the secret of Resurrection has effectively been lost with the death of Tory.

At that very moment, the Cylon Colony is hit by a barrage of Galactica's remaining nuclear warheads fired by Racetrack's Raptor, which knocks the Colony out of orbit, and dooms it to be swallowed by the black hole. The surviving Simon and Doral, deciding the whole process has been a trick, recommence the battle with the humans, and are gunned down. Cavil shouts "Frak!", puts his gun into his mouth, and commits suicide.

In Battlestar Galactica: The Plan, the history of the Cavils found in the fleet and on Caprica during "Lay Down Your Burdens" is expanded upon. The fleet version of Cavil is revealed to have been with Ellen Tigh when the attack on the Colonies commenced, having wanted to see just how much suffering she had undergone and what she had learned about the evils of humanity. Instead, Cavil discovers that, to his mind at least, Ellen had learned nothing. Cavil saved Ellen after the attacks as he wanted her to continue to suffer and accompanies Ellen to the fleet where Cavil takes command of the Cylon agents, ordering various acts of sabotage. However, each attempt is thwarted, causing Cavil to grow increasingly frustrated. During this time, he reluctantly befriends a young orphan named John, but murders the boy after he explicitly calls them friends.

On Caprica, Anders and the Caprica resistance discover the other Cavil copy who is overseeing a body disposal crew that is attacked by the resistance. Cavil is able to hide amongst the bodies, pretending to have been a survivor amongst the corpses. Cavil is surprised to be reunited with Anders as well as a Number Four model amongst the resistance, but delays acting in order to study Anders whose care for the humans comes to intrigue the Cylon. Cavil's interactions with Anders and the resistance greatly humanize Cavil who realizes that the Final Five will love the humans even if they are gone. After Anders angrily rebukes him, Cavil changes, deciding not to kill Starbuck and Anders when he has a shot. After the Cylons suddenly stop their attack, Cavil learns of the truce from a Number Six model and decides to convey the message himself despite his model voting against it.

When the Caprica copy of Cavil reaches Galactica, both Cavils are exposed as Cylons with "The Plan" making it clear that the Caprica Cavil purposefully did this to stop his other self. Arguing their differing points of view, the two Cavils are led to an airlock where the Caprica Cavil continues to try to convince his brother that they were wrong to try to destroy humanity. The Galactica Cavil reveals that there is a Resurrection Ship in range and that he intends to lead the destruction of humanity personally once he resurrects, suggesting that he is the same John Cavil encountered multiple times throughout the series. However, he intends to box the other Cavil, effectively putting him into cold storage to prevent him from spreading his heretical ideas to the rest of the Cylons. Despite their differences, the two Cavils hold hands as Admiral Adama personally blows them into outer space, the Caprica Cavil meeting his fate with eyes wide open while the Galactica Cavil shuts his eyes.

== Reception ==
According to Jon D. Bohland, Cavil has been described as the Cylon who best "fits the cinematic genocide perpetrator profile as the stereotypical remorseless killer with a lust for power and violence". Bohland compares him to "nationalists leaders such as Milosevic, Hitler and Pol Pot", noting that his strength, just like theirs, comes from being able to manipulate their followers by exploiting their grievances against other ethnicities (in this case, Cylon grievances versus the "humans"). While an atheist himself, even described as the Cylon who "exhibits the most resistance to religion", Cavil, in one of his forms masquerading as a human priest, is able to use it to manipulate those who are more religious, convincing them that they are acting as part of God's will. Bohland, as well Patrick Thaddeus Jackson remarked that Cavil's mentality is warped by his loathing of his creators, a form of an Oedipal complex. Maureen Ryan of the Chicago Tribune wrote:

Cavil could choose to leave the humans alone, but he just can't. If you think about it, he's the most flawed Cylon model of all. Of all the models we've seen up close, Cavil is the least interested in growing and changing and learning ... Unlike other Cylon models we've seen, he's not curious. He's not interested in changing his worldview. He's rigid in his definition of right and wrong, good and bad. His refusal to adapt is his fatal flaw ... He chooses to hate and to stay stuck. That could lead to the end of his race, but he'd rather die and be "in the right" than live in doubt and uncertainty.
