= Grace Park (actress) =

Canadian actress (born 1974)

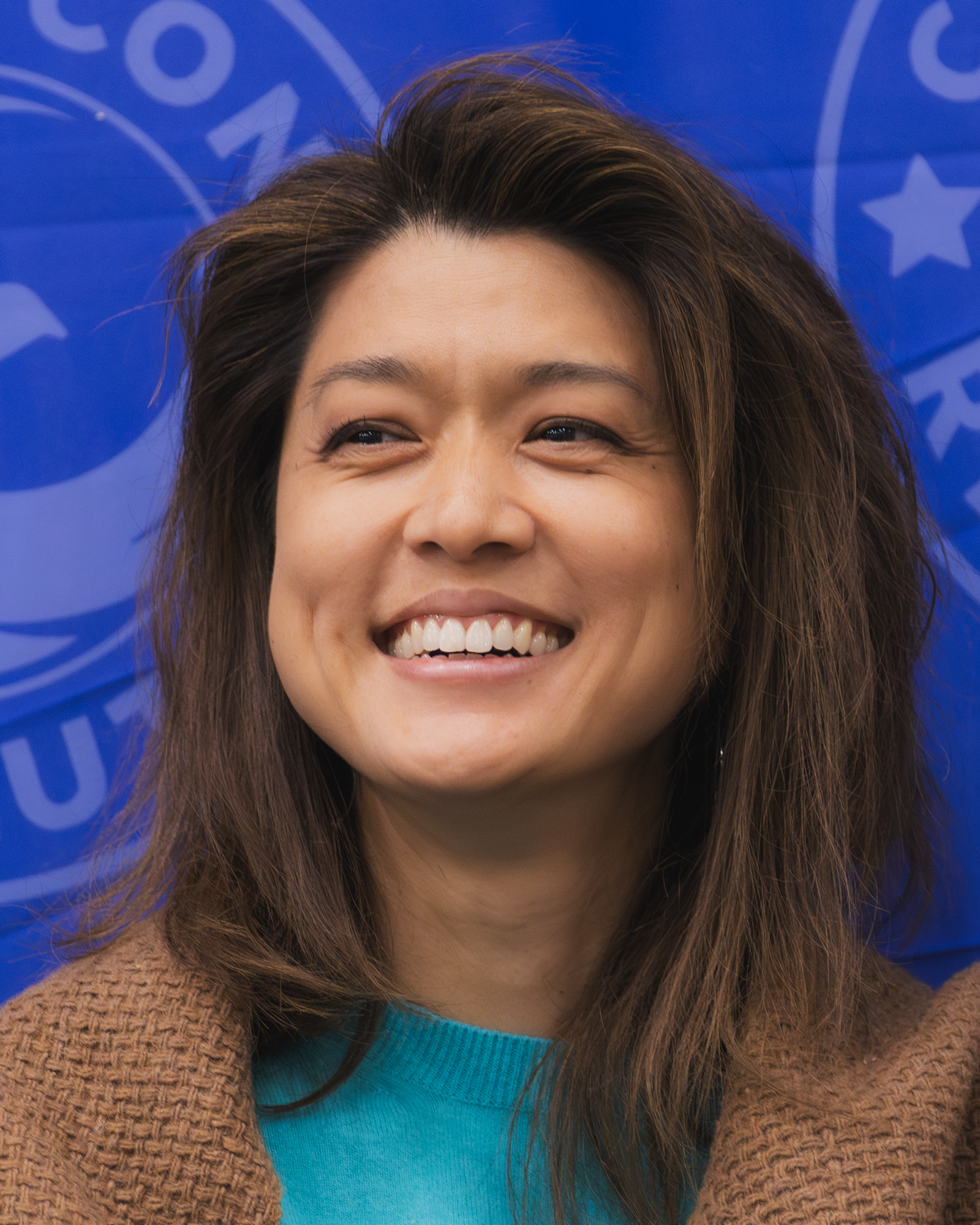
- Park in 2026
- Born: March 14, 1974 (age 52); Los Angeles, California, U.S.
- Citizenship: United States; Canada
- Education: Magee Secondary School; University of British Columbia
- Occupations: Actress, model
- Years active: 1992–present
- Known for: Battlestar Galactica; Hawaii Five-0; Edgemont; A Million Little Things
- Height: 5 ft 9 in (1.75 m)
- Spouse: Phil Kim (m. 2004)
- Children: 1

Grace Park (born March 14, 1974) is an American-Canadian actress and model, known for her roles as Sharon "Boomer" Valerii in the science-fiction series Battlestar Galactica, as Shannon Ng in the Canadian teen soap opera series Edgemont, as Officer Kono Kalakaua in the police procedural Hawaii Five-0, and as Katherine Kim in A Million Little Things.

== Early life ==
Born in Los Angeles to Korean parents, Park moved with her family to Canada when she was 22 months old. She was raised in the Vancouver neighbourhood of Kerrisdale. She graduated from Magee Secondary School in 1992 and holds a degree in psychology from the University of British Columbia.

== Career ==
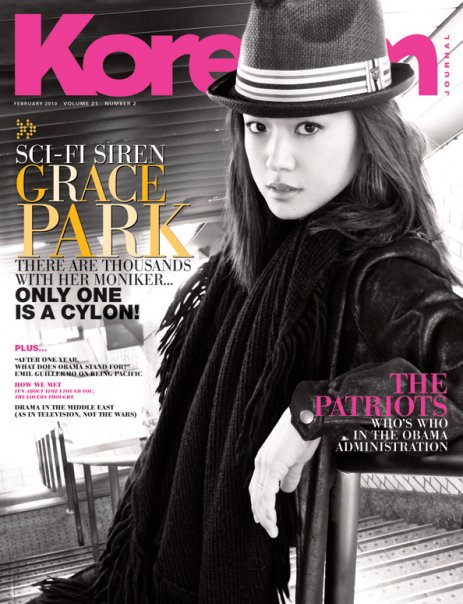
On the cover of KoreAm, February 2010

At age 25, Park was cast as high school student Shannon Ng on the Canadian teen soap opera Edgemont. She appeared in the miniseries Battlestar Galactica in 2003 and continued as the same or related characters in subsequent series and films.

Park had a role in the 2007 movie West 32nd, a crime drama set in New York City's Korean neighborhood. She appeared as Lt. Sandra Telfair in Electronic Arts' Command & Conquer 3: Tiberium Wars, along with her Battlestar Galactica co-star, Tricia Helfer.

In 2008, she had co-starring roles in the A&E series The Cleaner until it was cancelled on September 25, 2009, and the CBC series The Border until it was cancelled in 2010. In 2009, Park had a cameo role (uncredited) on the ninth season, twentieth episode of television show CSI: Crime Scene Investigation entitled "A Space Oddity". She appeared as a fan in a crowd at a science fiction convention, objecting to a gritty remake of a Star Trek–like series, comparable to the Battlestar Galactica remake in which she starred. In 2009 she reprised her role from Battlestar Galactica in the television movie Battlestar Galactica: The Plan.

In 2010, she appeared in the Fox series Human Target as Eva Kahn. Park was a main character, Kono Kalakaua, in the 2010 CBS revival of Hawaii Five-0 until 2017. Park and fellow Hawaii Five-0 co-star Daniel Dae Kim left the show in 2017, leaving the cast without any Asian regulars, after a salary dispute where it was reported that CBS's latest offer paid them 10–15% less than their white co-stars, Alex O'Loughlin and Scott Caan. CBS claimed that they had given "unprecedented" salary raises to Park and Kim, suggesting that they had been paid a lot less under their old contracts. Some critics noted that the network's "refusal to pay Kim and Park on matching terms with O'Loughlin and Caan was CBS's formal declaration that they were determined to protect a disparity that has been a sore point since the show's premiere: The assertion was that O'Loughlin and Caan are Hawaii Five-0 "stars" with Kim and Park being merely "co-leads" or supporting cast", yet Kim and Park were originally featured heavily on advertising and proved to be a crucial part of the show's success.

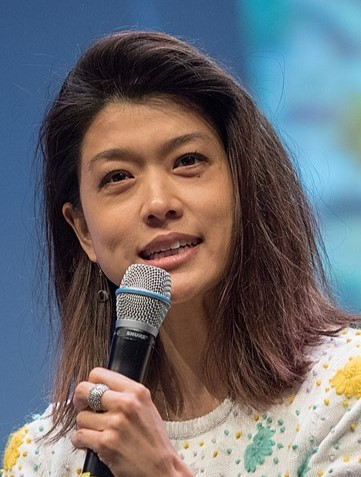
Park at the 2018 FedCon

In 2018, Park joined the cast of the ABC drama A Million Little Things, playing Katherine Kim, a lawyer, working mother and wife of a former musician. Park originally passed on the role twice, but the show's creator DJ Nash eventually convinced her to join by showing Park the program's cold open. Later in 2018, Park starred in the science fiction thriller Freaks, playing a government agent who apprehends people with supernatural abilities who are perceived as threats against humanity.

== Personal life ==
In 2004, Park married real estate developer Phil Kim. The two live in Vancouver. They have one son, born in 2013.

== Filmography ==
=== Film ===
| Year | Title | Role | Notes |
|---|---|---|---|
| 2000 | Romeo Must Die | Asian Dancer | |
| 2003 | Fluffy | Amy | Short film |
| 2007 | West 32nd | Lila Lee | |
| 2008 | Gods of Youth | Hannah Moon | |
| 2017 | Adventures in Public School | Mackenzie | |
| 2018 | Freaks | Agent Ray | |

=== Television ===
| Year | Title | Role | Notes |
|---|---|---|---|
| 1997 | The Outer Limits | Virtual Avatar | Episode: "Bits of Love" |
| 1997 | Beyond Belief: Fact or Fiction | Maddie | Episode: "The Crypt Ghost" |
| 2000 | Secret Agent Man | Louann/Staffer No. 2 | Episodes: "From Prima with Love", "Uncle S.A.M." |
| 2000–2001 | The Immortal | Mikiko | Recurring role (5 episodes) |
| 2001 | The Outer Limits | Satchko | Episode: "Time to Time" |
| 2001 | Dead Last | Bartender No. 2 | Episode: "Pilot" |
| 2001 | Dark Angel | Female Breeding X5 | Episode: "Designate This" |
| 2001 | Stargate SG-1 | Lt. Satterfield | Episode: "Proving Ground" |
| 2001–2005 | Edgemont | Shannon Ng | Main role (69 episodes) |
| 2002 | L.A. Law: The Movie | Charmaigne | TV film |
| 2003 | Jinnah: On Crime – White Knight, Black Widow | Cynthia Wong | TV film |
| 2003 | Battlestar Galactica | Lt. Sharon Valerii | TV miniseries |
| 2003–2004 | Jake 2.0 | Fran Yoshida | Recurring role (4 episodes) |
| 2004 | Human Cargo | Taiwanese Woman No. 1 | TV miniseries |
| 2004 | Andromeda | Doctor 26 Carol | Episode: "Machinery of the Mind" |
| 2004 | The Dead Zone | Sexy Bridesmaid | Episode: "Speak Now" |
| 2004–2009 | Battlestar Galactica | Lt. Sharon "Boomer" Valerii; Lt. Sharon "Athena" Agathon | Main role (73 episodes) |
| 2007 | Command & Conquer 3: Tiberium Wars | Lt. Sandra Telfair | Video game |
| 2007 | Battlestar Galactica: Razor | Lt. Sharon Valerii | TV film |
| 2008–2009 | Battlestar Galactica: The Face of the Enemy | Number Eight | TV miniseries |
| 2008–2009 | The Cleaner | Akani Cuesta | Main role (26 episodes) |
| 2008–2010 | The Border | Special Agent Liz Carver | Main role (12 episodes) |
| 2009 | CSI: Crime Scene Investigation | Convention Attendee | Episode: "A Space Oddity" |
| 2009 | Battlestar Galactica: The Plan | Lt. Sharon "Boomer" Valerii | TV film |
| 2010 | Human Target | Eva Khan | Episode: "Corner Man" |
| 2010, 2013 | American Dad! | Akiko Yoshida (voice) | Episodes: "Best Little Horror House in Langley Falls", "Spelling Bee My Baby" |
| 2010–2017 | Hawaii Five-0 | Kono Kalakaua | Main role seasons 1–7; (168 episodes); Nominated: 2013 Teen Choice Awards – Choice TV Actress: Action |
| 2017 | MacGyver | Kono Kalakaua | Episode 18: "Flashlight" |
| 2018–2023 | A Million Little Things | Katherine Kim | Main role |
