= Michael Trucco =

American actor (born 1970)

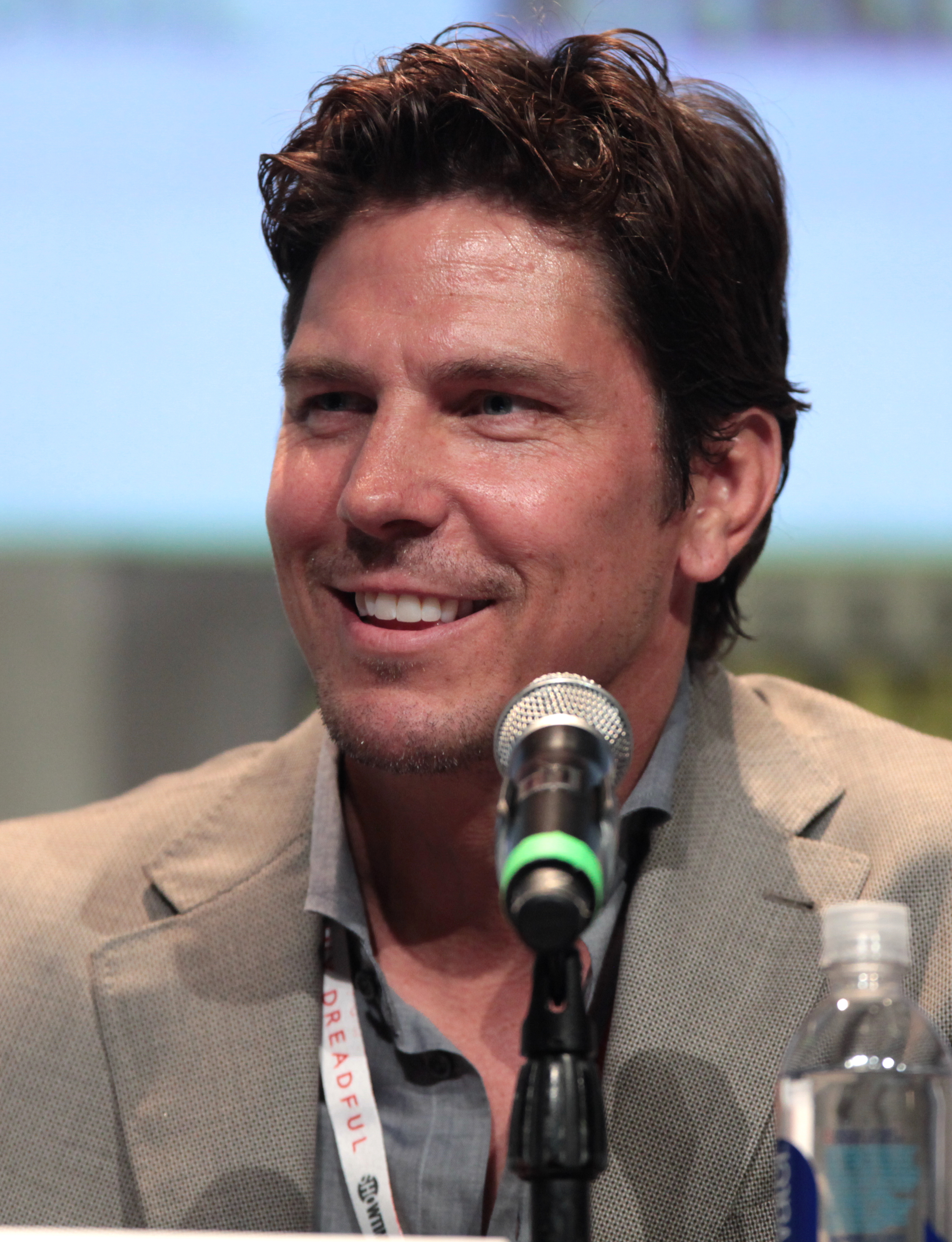
- Trucco at San Diego Comic Con 2015
- Born: Edward Michael Trucco; June 22, 1970 (age 56); San Mateo, California, U.S.
- Occupation: Actor
- Years active: 1994–present
- Spouse: Sandra Hess (m. 2009)

Edward Michael Trucco (born June 22, 1970) is an American actor. He is known for his role as Samuel Anders on the reimagined Battlestar Galactica and his recurring role as Nick Podarutti in How I Met Your Mother. He also appeared on the 2017–2018 Netflix series Disjointed, as Tae Kwon Douglas, a local martial arts instructor who was anti-drug.

== Early life ==
A native of San Mateo, California, Trucco attended Junipero Serra High School where he played football and wrestled. He is the son of a police officer, and was once interested in becoming one himself until college, when he was attracted to theatrical performance. He took a theatre course for non-majors while he was studying Criminal Justice, but he did so well that he was asked to consider changing majors. He changed majors and completed his bachelor's degree in Theatre Arts at Santa Clara University. He has Italian and Norwegian ancestry.

== Career ==
Trucco became active in television in the late 1990s with appearances in episodes of Touched by an Angel, Silk Stalkings, Beverly Hills, 90210, Sabrina The Teenage Witch, Dr. Quinn, Medicine Woman, and Pensacola: Wings of Gold among others. He continued appearing in shows of similar genres like CSI, Heartbeart, Strong Medicine, CSI: Miami, and others into the 2000s. He played Cooper Lee in six episodes of One Tree Hill from 2005 to 2006.

In 2002, Trucco starred in Wishmaster: The Prophecy Fulfilled. In 2005, he joined the drama Battlestar Galactica in the role of Samuel Anders. In 2008, he guest-starred on NBC's Law & Order: Special Victims Unit and The Big Bang Theory. In 2010, he guest-starred on ABC's series Castle as Detective Tom Demming. In 2010, Trucco was cast as a series regular in the USA Network series Fairly Legal.

Trucco guest-starred in a season 6 episode of How I Met Your Mother in 2011, and had a recurring role in the show's eighth season. He played the recurring character Nate Ryan in the second season of Revenge. He later played Elliot's brother in the 2017 film The Bye Bye Man.

Trucco is also the lead guitarist of the band Simpleworld.

== Personal life ==
On Sunday, December 2, 2007, Trucco was involved in a car crash with a friend who was driving a Ferrari 360 on the Pacific Coast Highway in Malibu, California. The vehicle flipped on an embankment, landing upside-down, impacting Trucco's side of the car. Trucco was badly injured in the collision, fracturing four of his vertebrae, whereas his friend walked away uninjured. He has stated that he initially lost feeling in his arms. He was eventually able to get out of the vehicle after regaining feeling in his hands and used his cell phone to call for emergency help. Trucco was airlifted to Ronald Reagan UCLA Medical Center for further care. On December 10, 2007, he was released from the hospital’s care. Doctors said he was extremely lucky, suffering almost the same injury as Christopher Reeve.

== Filmography ==
=== Film ===
Year	Title	Role	Notes
1994	Eyes of Terror	Officer	Television film
1998	Confessions of a Sexist Pig	Troy	
2001	Knight Club	Derek	
2001	Ablaze	Scott	
2001	A Girl, Three Guys, and a Gun	Trevor	
2002	Wishmaster: The Prophecy Fulfilled	Steven Verdel	Direct-to-video
2003	The Groomsmen	Scott	
2004	Perfect Romance	Miles "Boogie" Healey	Television film
2007	Next	Kendall	
2009	Battlestar Galactica: The Plan	Samuel Anders	Direct-to-video
2010	Meteor Storm	Colonel Tom Young	Television film
2010	All American Tooles	Todd Toole	Short film
2016	Hush	John	
2017	The Bye Bye Man	Virgil	
2018	Hunter Killer	Devin Hall	
2020	Through the Glass Darkly	Trip Carmichael	
2024	The Life of Chuck	Dylan's Dad	
2025	The Electric State	Ben Abbott	

=== Television ===
Year	Title	Role	Notes
1995	Hang Time	Tim Ritter	Episode: "Earl Makes the Grade"
1996	Sisters	Young Elton Grenthal	Episode: "The Best Man"
1996	The Guilt	Michael McKenzie	Episode: "Dean's Office"
1996	California Dreams	Dann Hazakoff	Episode: "Babewatch"
1997	Silk Stalkings	Dave	Episode: "Air-Tight Alibi"
1997	Sunset Beach	Officer	Uncredited; season 1, episode 215
1997	Touched by an Angel	Thomas "Tommy" Doyle	Episode: "Venice"
1998	Beverly Hills, 90210	Josh Hunter	3 episodes
1998	Dr. Quinn, Medicine Woman	Patrick Collins	Episode: "Seeds of Doubt"
1998–2000	Pensacola: Wings of Gold	Lieutenant Tucker "Spoon" Henry	Main cast (seasons 2–3); 40 episodes
1999	Charmed	Alec	Episode: "Love Hurts"
2000	Nash Bridges	Gil Vallone	Episode: "Missing Key"
2000	Freedom	Nolan	Episode: "Siege"
2001	Sabrina, the Teenage Witch	Kevin	4 episodes
2001	Family Law	Lee Bigelow	Episode: "Bringing Up Babies"
2001	Arliss	Rounder Fleming	Episode: "The Price of Their Toys"
2001	That's Life	Jason Prader	2 episodes
2002	Arliss	Fred Russell	Episode: "Playing It Safe"
2002	Bram & Alice	Robert	Episode: "Required Reading"
2002	CSI: Crime Scene Investigation	Fred Dacks	Episode: "High and Low"
2003	Tru Calling	Nick Kelly	Episode: "Putting Out Fires"
2003	The Parkers	Bill	Episode: "Out with the Old, in with the New"
2004	Strong Medicine	Victor	Episode: "Selective Breeding"
2005	Strong Medicine	Zack	Episode: "First Response"
2005	CSI: Miami	Mitch Lockhart	Episode: "One Night Stand"
2005	Joey	Paul	Episode: "Joey and the Wrong Name"
2005–2006	One Tree Hill	Cooper Lee	6 episodes
2005–2009	Battlestar Galactica	Samuel Anders	Recurring (seasons 2–3); Main cast (season 4); 35 episodes
2008	Eli Stone	Adam Mitchell	Episode: "One More Try"
2008	Law & Order: Special Victims Unit	Eric Lutz	Episode: "Smut"
2008	The Big Bang Theory	Dr. David Underhill	Episode: "The Bath Item Gift Hypothesis"
2010	V	John May	Episode: "John May"
2010	Castle	Detective Tom Demming	4 episodes
2010	100 Questions	Luke	Episode: "Have You Ever Dated a Bad Boy?"
2011–2012	Fairly Legal	Justin Patrick	Main cast; 23 episodes
2011–2012	How I Met Your Mother	Nick Podarutti	7 episodes
2011	Psych	Cal Eason	Episode: "Dead Man's Curve Ball"
2012	Young Justice	Adam Strange (voice)	4 episodes
2012–2013	Revenge	Nate Ryan	7 episodes
2014	Killer Women	Billy Parker	Main cast; 8 episodes
2014	Intelligence	Secret Service Agent Charlie Griffin	Episode: "Secrets of the Secret Service"
2014	Criminal Minds	Owen McGregor	2 episodes
2014	Scandal	Charles "Chip" Putney	Episode: "Baby Made a Mess"
2014	The Exes	Jeff	Episode: "Love and Death"
2015	The Librarians	Sam Denning	Episode: "The Librarians and the Infernal Contract"
2016	Grandfathered	Craig	4 episodes
2017	Disjointed	Tae Kwon Doug	Recurring role
2017	Chicago P.D.	Frank Barrett	Episode: "Rabbit Hole"
2019–present	The Rookie	Sean Del Monte	11 episodes
2019, 2024	The Good Doctor	Ethan Murphy	2 episodes
2021	FBI	Ethan Shaw	Episode: "Leverage"
2021	Midnight Mass	Wade Scarborough	Main cast; 7 episodes
2022–present	Fire Country	Luke Leone	Recurring role
2022	Young Sheldon	Dusty	Episode: "Passion's Harvest and a Sheldocracy"
2023	The Fall of the House of Usher	Rufus Griswold	8 episodes
2023–present	Average Joe	Benjamin "Touch" Tuchawuski	Main cast
2026	Carrie	John Hargensen	Main cast
