= Matthew Bennett =

Canadian actor, writer and director

- Born: Matthew Ray Bennett; April 9, 1968 (age 58); Toronto, Ontario, Canada
- Other name: Matt Bennett
- Occupations: Actor, writer, director
- Years active: 1991–present
- Spouse: Brittaney Bennett

Matthew Ray Bennett (born April 9, 1968) is a Canadian actor, writer, and director. He is best known for portraying Detective Len Harper on Cold Squad and his recurring roles as Aaron Doral cylon model number five in the reimagined Battlestar Galactica and Daniel Rosen in Orphan Black.

== Career ==
At the age of 20 he moved from his hometown of Toronto, Ontario to Vancouver, British Columbia to pursue an acting career. He studied theatre school for two years and after that acted in TV series including The X-Files and The Commish and telefilms such as A Killer Among Friends, Anything for Love and Relentless: Mind of a Killer. He currently lives in Vancouver but works in Toronto as well.

Matthew is best known for his part as Detective Len Harper on the Canadian police drama Cold Squad for which he has been nominated for both a Gemini and Leo award. Next to that he played the lead role of Lieutenant James Calley on the Showtime series Total Recall 2070 and the 1998 telefilm by the same name. Next to that, he guest starred in many TV series like Stargate SG-1, The Peacemakers, Da Vinci's Inquest, Criminal Minds and At the Hotel. In recent years, Bennett has had a recurring guest role on the Sci Fi Channel television program Battlestar Galactica. Playing the character Aaron Doral, a Cylon, he first appeared in the 2003 mini-series and his final appearance was in the series finale in March 2009. However, Bennett also appeared in the TV movie Battlestar Galactica: The Plan.

== Personal life ==
Bennett was married to actress Brittaney Bennett (formerly Brittaney Edgell), best known for her parts on series as Highlander, Forever Knight and Earth: Final Conflict. She also starred in his writing and directing debut, the 2008 movie Kick Me Down.

== Filmography ==
=== Actor ===
Year	Title	Role	Notes/Episode
1994	The X-Files	Workman #1	Episode: "The Host"
1995	Exquisite Tenderness		
1996	Road to Avonlea	Edward Osborne	Episode: "Ah...Sweet Mystery of Life"
1996	Due South	Special Agent Casey	Episode: "The Edge"
1996	Swann	Doctor	
1997	PSI Factor: Chronicles of the Paranormal	Captain Hastings	Episode: "Man of War"
1997	A Prayer in the Dark	David	
1997	When Secrets Kill	Bill Emery	
1997	Time to Say Goodbye?	FBI Officer	
1997	Titanic: Musical	Pitman	Broadway
1998	Dogboys	Carl Ewing	
1998	Thanks of a Grateful Nation	Dr. Larson	
1998	Due South	Jack Goody	Episode: "Easy Money"
1999	Earth: Final Conflict	Jerry Hanlon	
1999	Ultimate Deception	Federal Building Guard	
1999	Total Recall 2070	James Calley	
1999	Dangerous Evidence: The Lori Jackson Story		
1999	Pushing Tin	Dynajet Steward	
1999	Judgment Day: The Ellie Nesler Story	Psychiatrist, 1983	
1999	Sirens	Roy Dancer	
1999	The Time Shifters	Captain Tyler	
1999	Law & Order	Andrew Hampton	Episode: "Juvenile"
2000	D.C.	Assistant Bureau Chief	
2000	Songs in Ordinary Time	Ross Hinds	Episode: "Blame"
2000	Da Vinci's Inquest	Uniform #1	Episode: "That's the Way the Story Goes"
2000	Stargate SG-1	Ted	Episode: "Point of No Return"
2000–2005	Cold Squad	Det. Len Harper	Main (seasons 5–7); recurring (season 4)
2001	A Perfect Execution	Roger	
2001	HRT		
2001	Ignition	DOD Lawyer	
2001	Da Vinci's Inquest	Uniform #1	Episode: "It's Backwards Day"
2001	Seven Days	Henry Bilkins	Episode: "Empty Quiver"
2002	UC: Undercover	Detective	Episode: "Teddy C"
2002	K-9: P.I.	FBI Agent Henry	Video
2003	Stealing Sinatra	Agent Flett	
2003	Peacemakers	Steward Harrison	
2003	Battlestar Galactica	Aaron Doral/Number Five	Recurring
2004	Andromeda	Cutter	Episode: "So Burn the Untamed Lands"
2004	Stargate SG-1	Jared Kane	Episode: "Icon"
2005	Criminal Minds	Adam Lloyd	Episode: "Popular Kids"
2006	Stargate SG-1	Jared Kane	Episode: "Ethon"
2007	Sabbatical	Patrick Marlowe	TV Pilot
2008	M.V.P.	Malcolm LeBlanc	Recurring
2008, 2011	Flashpoint	Naismith	"The Element of Surprise" (2008) & "The Better Man" (2011)
2009	Spectacular!	Rich Dickenson	Principal role
2011–2022	Murdoch Mysteries	Allen Clegg	Recurring
2013	Rewind	John Malcolm	TV Pilot
2013	Rookie Blue	Simon Dent	
2013	Saving Hope	Graham Kennedy	Episode: "Bed One"
2013	Orphan Black	Daniel Rosen	6 episodes
2015	The Secret Life of Marilyn Monroe	Whitey	
2018	Love, of Course	Bert Morgan	Hallmark
2018	The Expanse	Lt. Durant	Episode: "Triple point"

=== Writer ===
Year	Title
2001	9/11
2008	Kick Me Down

=== Director ===
Year	Title
2008	Kick Me Down

== Awards ==
Year	Award	Category	Movie/show	Result	Ref.
2003	Gemini Award	Best Performance by an Actor in a Continuing Leading Dramatic Role	Cold Squad (episode: "True Believers, part II")	Nominated	
2004	Leo Awards	Best Lead Performance by a Male in a Dramatic Series	Cold Squad (episode: "Mr. Bad Example")	Nominated	
