= Rekha Sharma =

Canadian actress

- Sharma at the 2018 FedCon
- Born: Vancouver, British Columbia, Canada
- Occupation: Actress
- Years active: 2001–present

Rekha Shanti Sharma is a Canadian actress of Indo-Fijian descent, best known for her role as Tory Foster on Battlestar Galactica (2006–2009), and Ellen Landry on Star Trek: Discovery.

== Career ==
Sharma began her acting career in her 20s. She has stage experience but also appeared in television series such as Da Vinci's City Hall, House M.D., The Lone Gunmen, Smallville, Supernatural, John Doe, Dark Angel, The Twilight Zone, Sanctuary, Hellcats, The Listener, Star Trek: Discovery, Battlestar Galactica, and the 2009 re-imagined television series of V.

She has also appeared in the films The Core, Tasmanian Devils, and Aliens vs. Predator: Requiem.

== Personal life ==
Sharma plays the sarangi.

== Filmography ==
=== Film ===
Year	Title	Role	Notes	Ref.
2002	Liberty Stands Still	Usherette		
2003	The Invitation	Wife	Scenes deleted	
2003	Where's the Party Yaar?	Girl		
2003	The Core	Danni		
2005	Edison	Prosecutor		
2005	Fierce People	Social Worker	Uncredited	
2006	Memory	Becka		
2007	Whisper	Mora		
2007	Aliens vs Predator: Requiem	Nurse Helen		
2009	Love Happens	Nose-Ring		
2013	Tasmanian Devils	Lisbon		
2014	Shamed	Asha Malik	Short film	
2015	No Men Beyond This Point	Ajala Bhatt		
2016	Dark Harvest	Coroner		
2021	Traces	Emily		
2022	It's a Wonderful Binge	Aunt Fern		

=== Television ===
Year	Title	Role	Notes
2001	The Lone Gunmen	First EMT	Episode: "The 'Cap n Toby' Show"
2001	The Outer Limits	Reese	Episode: "Mindreacher"
2001	Cold Squad	Receptionist	Episode: "Personal Politics"
2001	Mysterious Ways	E.R. Doctor	Episode: "Doctor in the House"
2001–2002	Dark Angel	Dr. Beverly Shankar	5 episodes
2002	Mysterious Ways	Reporter #1	Episode: "Listen"
2002	The Twilight Zone	Kate Danvers	Episode: "Found and Lost"
2002–2003	John Doe	Stella	15 episodes
2002–2006	Smallville	Dr. Harden	7 episodes
2004	The L Word	Lori	2 episodes
2004	House	Melanie Landon	Episode: "Pilot"
2005	Ladies Night	Account Manager	Television movie
2005–2006	Da Vinci's City Hall	Constable Cindy Winters	10 episodes
2006	This Space For Rent	Casting Agent	Episode: "Pear-Shaped World"
2006–2009	Battlestar Galactica	Tory Foster	31 episodes
2008	The Guard	Isha	Episode: "Sounds of Loneliness"
2008	Sanctuary	Amy Saunders	Episode: "Instinct"
2009	CSI: Crime Scene Investigation	Convention attendee	Episode: "A Space Oddity"
2009–2011	V	Sarita Malik	8 episodes
2010	Supernatural	Kali	Episode: "Hammer of the Gods"
2011	The Listener	Lynn Kendall	Episode: "Lady in the Lake"
2011	Hellcats	Heidi Raft	Episode: "Remember When"
2011	Nikita	Nisha Patel	Episode: "Knightfall"
2013	Arrow	Claire Abbot	Episode: "Dodger"
2013	Once Upon a Time in Wonderland	Ulima	Episode: "Bad Blood"
2014–2015	The 100	Dr. Lorelei Tsing	Recurring; 9 episodes
2016	Her Dark Past	Dr. Mathur	Television movie
2017–2020	Star Trek: Discovery	Commander Ellen Landry (Prime/Mirror)	Recurring; 5 episodes
2018	Bravest Warriors	Quince	2 episodes
2019	Limetown	Special Agent Siddiqui	4 episodes
2021	Another Life	AI Specialist Ursula Monroe	Recurring; 3 episodes
2021–2022	Yellowjackets	Jessica Roberts	Recurring
2022	The Imperfects	Dominique Crain	Recurring
2022	Roswell, New Mexico	Shivani Sen	9 episodes
2022–2024	Transplant	Neeta Devi	Series regular
2024	The Cleaning Lady	Susan Redman	4 episodes
2026	Avatar: The Last Airbender	Amita	5 episodes

=== Video games ===
Year	Title	Voice	Notes
2019	Star Trek Online	Ellen Landry	
2026	Star Wars Zero Company	Fathom	

=== Web series ===
Year	Title	Role	Notes
2017	Star Trek Continues	Avi Samara	Episode VIII: "Still Treads the Shadow"
