= Battlestar Galactica season 2 =

Battlestar Galactica
- Season 2
- Season 2.0 DVD cover
- No. of episodes: 20

Release
- Original network: Sci Fi
- Original release: July 15, 2005 – March 10, 2006

Season chronology
- ← Previous; Season 1 Next → Season 3

The second season of the reimagined science fiction television series Battlestar Galactica premiered on Sci Fi in the United States on July 15, 2005, and concluded on March 10, 2006. The season was split into two parts, each containing 10 episodes. "Season 2.0" aired from July to September 2005, and "Season 2.5" aired from January to March 2006.

== Cast and characters ==
=== Main cast ===
These actors are credited during the opening sequence:

- Edward James Olmos as William Adama
- Mary McDonnell as Laura Roslin
- Katee Sackhoff as Kara "Starbuck" Thrace
- Jamie Bamber as Lee "Apollo" Adama
- James Callis as Gaius Baltar
- Tricia Helfer as Number Six
- Grace Park as Sharon "Boomer" Valerii (Number Eight)

These actors are credited after the opening sequence:

- Michael Hogan as Saul Tigh
- Aaron Douglas as Galen Tyrol
- Tahmoh Penikett as Karl "Helo" Agathon
- Paul Campbell as Billy Keikeya
- Nicki Clyne as Cally Henderson
- Alessandro Juliani as Felix Gaeta
- Kandyse McClure as Anastasia Dualla

=== Recurring ===
- Sam Witwer as Alex "Crashdown" Quartararo
- Kate Vernon as Ellen Tigh
- Donnelly Rhodes as Sherman Cottle
- Richard Hatch as Tom Zarek
- Michael Trucco as Samuel Anders
- Lorena Gale as Priestess Elosha
- Rick Worthy as Simon / Number Four
- James Remar as Meier (credited as a special guest star)
- Matthew Bennett as Aaron Doral / Number Five
- Lucy Lawless as D'Anna Biers / Number Three
- Michelle Forbes as Helena Cain
- Graham Beckel as Jack Fisk
- John Pyper-Ferguson as Cole "Stinger" Taylor
- Sebastian Spence as Noel "Narcho" Allison
- Rekha Sharma as Tory Foster
- Dean Stockwell as John Cavil / Number One
- Luciana Carro as Louanne "Kat" Katraine
- Bodie Olmos as Brendan "Hot Dog" Costanza
- Leah Cairns as Margaret "Racetrack" Edmondson
- Alonso Oyarzun as Socinus
- Kurt Evans as Paramedic Howard Kim
- Chris Shields as Corporal Venner
- Jennifer Halley as Diana "Hardball" Seelix
- Ty Olsson as Captain Aaron Kelly
- Michael Tayles as Flyboy
- Aleks Paunovic as Marine Sgt. Omar Fischer
- Dominic Zamprogna as Jammer
- Patricia Idlette as Sarah Porter
- Malcolm Stewart as Marshall Bagot
- Tamara Lashley as Sue-Shaun
- Jeremy Guilbaut as Lt. Joe "Hammerhead" Palladino
- Curtis Lee Hicks as Marine Sergeant
- Christina Schild as Playa
- Christian Tessier as Tucker "Duck" Clellan
- Vincent Gale as Chief Peter Laird
- Peter-John Prinsloo as Lt. Mei "Freaker" Firelli
- Brad Dryborough as Lt. Louis Hoshi
- Alisen Down as Jean Barolay
- Erica Cerra as Maya
- David Kaye as James McManus

=== Guest ===
- Colm Feore as President Richard Adar
- Paul Perri as Royan Jahee
- Claudette Mink as Shevon
- Bill Duke as Phelan
- Dana Delany as Sesha Abinell
- John Heard as Commander Barry Garner
- Kerry Norton as Paramedic Layne Ishay
- Callum Keith Rennie as Leoben Conoy / Number Two

== Episodes ==
No. overall	No. in season	Title	Survivor count	Directed by	Written by	Original release date
Season 2.0
14	1	"Scattered"	47,875	Michael Rymer	David Weddle & Bradley Thompson	July 15, 2005
With Adama in sickbay, Tigh is forced to take command of Galactica, but is quickly plunged into a crisis when the fleet and Galactica jump to separate locations.
15	2	"Valley of Darkness"	47,874	Michael Rymer	David Weddle & Bradley Thompson	July 22, 2005
A Cylon boarding party wreaks havoc throughout the ship, while the stranded crewmen on Kobol struggle to stay alive.
16	3	"Fragged"	47,862	Sergio Mimica-Gezzan	Dawn Prestwich & Nicole Yorkin	July 29, 2005
Tigh, overwhelmed by the responsibilities of command, deals with the growing political tension throughout the fleet.
17	4	"Resistance"	47,861	Allan Kroeker	Toni Graphia	August 5, 2005
Tigh's imposition of martial law sparks protests in the fleet. Meanwhile, Starbuck and Helo discover additional survivors on Caprica.
18	5	"The Farm"	47,857	Rod Hardy	Carla Robinson	August 12, 2005
Adama reassumes command. Part of the fleet jumps with Roslin back to Kobol. Starbuck, Helo, and the Cylon Boomer leave Caprica.
19	6	"Home (Part 1)"	47,858	Sergio Mimica-Gezzan	David Eick	August 19, 2005
With Starbuck's return, Roslin begins her quest to find the Tomb of Athena, while Adama struggles to replace crewmen lost to Roslin's mutiny.
20	7	"Home (Part 2)"	47,855	Jeff Woolnough	David Eick & Ronald D. Moore	August 26, 2005
Roslin and her followers continue their search for the Tomb of Athena on Kobol as Adama travels there to reunite the fleet.
21	8	"Final Cut"	47,853	Robert Young	Mark Verheiden	September 9, 2005
An ambitious journalist in the fleet is given unlimited access to Galactica and her crew.
22	9	"Flight of the Phoenix"	47,853	Michael Nankin	David Weddle & Bradley Thompson	September 16, 2005
Galactica's crew fights to contain a Cylon computer virus spreading throughout the ship while Tyrol launches a project to build a new fighter.
23	10	"Pegasus"	49,605	Michael Rymer	Anne Cofell Saunders	September 23, 2005
With the arrival of the Battlestar Pegasus, the fleet is exuberant. However, Adama soon worries about Admiral Cain, Pegasus's commanding officer and Adama's superior, in command of the fleet.
Season 2.5
24	11	"Resurrection Ship (Part 1)"	49,604	Michael Rymer	Story by : Anne Cofell Saunders; Teleplay by : Michael Rymer	January 6, 2006
The conflict between Galactica and Pegasus is put on hold with the discovery of a vital Cylon ship.
25	12	"Resurrection Ship (Part 2)"	49,604	Michael Rymer	Michael Rymer & Ronald D. Moore	January 13, 2006
The battle to destroy the Resurrection Ship begins as both Adama and Cain make plans to seize complete command of the military.
26	13	"Epiphanies"	49,598	Rod Hardy	Joel Anderson Thompson	January 20, 2006
Roslin lies on her deathbed, recalling her last day on Caprica with startling revelations. Meanwhile a group of sympathizers want to make peace with the Cylons.
27	14	"Black Market"	49,597	James Head	Mark Verheiden	January 27, 2006
The death of a senior Colonial officer prompts Apollo to lead an investigation into the rampant black market in the fleet.
28	15	"Scar"	49,593	Michael Nankin	David Weddle & Bradley Thompson	February 3, 2006
Starbuck's mental state is in question as Galactica's fighters are hunted by a veteran Cylon raider known as "Scar".
29	16	"Sacrifice"	49,590	Rey Villalobos	Anne Cofell Saunders	February 10, 2006
Terrorists take hostages aboard Cloud 9, demanding the handover of the Cylon onboard Galactica.
30	17	"The Captain's Hand"	49,584	Sergio Mimica-Gezzan	Jeff Vlaming	February 17, 2006
Apollo and Starbuck struggle with Commander Barry Garner, the overbearing chief engineer turned-CO of Pegasus, as Roslin makes a decision on a very hot political issue following the arrival of a stowaway on Galactica.
31	18	"Downloaded"	49,579	Jeff Woolnough	Bradley Thompson & David Weddle	February 24, 2006
Roslin and Adama struggle to decide what to do with the Cylon/Human hybrid as Sharon goes into labor. Meanwhile, Caprica-Six and Boomer are downloaded and reborn on Caprica.
32	19	"Lay Down Your Burdens (Part 1)"	49,579	Michael Rymer	Ronald D. Moore	March 3, 2006
With the presidential elections weeks away, a new discovery could turn the entire election around. Meanwhile, Starbuck leads a team back to Caprica to rescue the resistance fighters.
33	20	"Lay Down Your Burdens (Part 2)"	49,550	Michael Rymer	Anne Cofell Saunders & Mark Verheiden	March 10, 2006
With the elections underway, Starbuck returns from her mission along with a Cylon who delivers an unexpected message to Adama and Roslin.

== Production and reception ==
Following the success of the 13-episode first season, the Sci-Fi Channel ordered a 20-episode second season on February 23, 2005. The season premiered in the United States on the Sci-Fi Channel on July 15, 2005, with the UK, Ireland, and Canadian premiere in January 2006. In fall 2005, airing of the second season halted, as it was part of Sci-Fi Channel's standard airing schedule normally used for its Stargate series, which was to split a 20-episode season into two parts (a "winter season" and a "summer season") to avoid heavy competition with major networks that follow a spring/fall schedule. Universal Home Video took this break as an opportunity to package the episodes aired thus far into a DVD set, calling it "Season 2.0". The final episode of the first half, "Pegasus", was originally 15 minutes too long for broadcast, but according to creator Ronald Moore, the production team decided to cut the episode to time rather than pad it out to fill 90 minutes, as this was deemed impractical. The longer version of "Pegasus" appears on the Battlestar Galactica Season 2.5 DVD set, which was released in the U.S. on September 19, 2006. Sky did not contribute financially to the second season, though UK broadcasts credit the company at the end of every episode.

The second half of season two ("Season 2.5") began airing on January 6, 2006, after a three-month hiatus, during which the Sci-Fi Channel mounted a huge publicity effort. Battlestar Galactica picked up considerable critical acclaim from the mainstream press, including being named the #1 show of 2005 by Time magazine, and being listed on numerous top ten lists of both 2005 and 2006 by publications such as the Chicago Tribune, Entertainment Weekly, Newsday and TV Guide. The American Film Institute also named it one of the ten best television shows of 2005. There was some criticism that a few episodes following "Resurrection Ship, Part 2" were not up to par with previous episodes, such as the episode "Black Market", for which even Ron Moore expressed some disdain. Moore stated in his blog that he felt this was a result of the larger workload the series faced with twenty episodes, instead of thirteen in season one. However, episode 15, "Scar", was thought to bring the series back up to its high level of quality, and subsequent episodes "The Captain's Hand", "Downloaded", and the two part finale "Lay Down Your Burdens", were hailed by fans and critics alike. Moore expressed that the longer break between seasons two and three (seven months instead of two) would help to ensure that all episodes were up to the high level of quality that the production team strove to maintain.

== Reception ==
=== Critical response ===
On Rotten Tomatoes, the season has an approval rating of 100% with an average score of 9.5 out of 10 based on 12 reviews. The website's critical consensus reads, "In its second season, Battlestar Galatica doubles down on the series' high-minded themes and satisfyingly complex storylines."

=== Awards ===
Wins

- 2005 Saturn Award for Best Syndicated/Cable Television Series
- 2005 Saturn Award for Best Supporting Actor on Television – James Callis
- 2005 Saturn Award for Best Supporting Actress on Television – Katee Sackhoff
- 2006 Scream Award for Best Television Show
- 2006 Spacey Awards for Best Television Show
- 2005 Visual Effects Society Award for Outstanding Animated Character in a Live Action Broadcast Program, Commercial, or Music Video (Cylon Centurion in "Fragged")

Nominations

- 2006 ALMA Award for Outstanding Actor in a Television Series – Edward James Olmos
- 2006 Emmy Award for Outstanding Special Visual Effects for a Series ("Resurrection Ship, Part 2")
- 2006 Emmy Award for Outstanding Costumes for a Series ("Lay Down Your Burdens, Part 2")
- 2006 Emmy Award for Outstanding Single-Camera Sound Mixing for a Series ("Scattered")
- 2006 Hugo Award for Best Dramatic Presentation, Short Form ("Pegasus")
- 2005 Saturn Award for Best Supporting Actor on Television – Jamie Bamber
- 2005 Saturn Award for Best Television Release on DVD (Season 2.0)
- 2005 Visual Effects Society Award for Outstanding Animated Character in a Live Action Broadcast Program, Commercial, or Music Video (Cylon in "Valley of Darkness")

== Home video releases ==
Season 2.0 and 2.5 were released on DVD in region 1 on December 20, 2005, and September 19, 2006, respectively. The complete second season was released on Blu-ray Disc in region 1 on April 6, 2010. The complete second season was released on DVD in region 2 on August 28, 2006 and in region 4 on April 4, 2007.

The Season 2.0 DVD set includes the first 10 episodes of season two. Special features on the set include creator Ronald D. Moore's podcast commentaries for 7 of the 10 episodes; a podcast for "Fragged" was not recorded, while the podcasts for "Flight of the Phoenix" and "Pegasus" were not recorded in time for the DVDs, but are available on the official website. Also included are deleted scenes for 9 episodes and a sneak peek promo for the second half of the season. The Season 2.5 DVD set includes the last 10 episodes of season two, plus the extended hour-long version of "Pegasus". Special features include Moore's podcast commentaries for all 10 episodes; he is joined by writers David Weddle and Bradley Thompson on "Scar", his wife Terry Dresbach on "Lay Down Your Burdens, Part 1" and executive producer David Eick on "Lay Down Your Burdens, Part 2". Moore and Eick provide audio commentary for the extended version of "Pegasus", a commentary specifically produced for the DVD. Also included are deleted scenes for 8 episodes, 7 of David Eick's videoblogs, and a collection of the R&D logos that appear at the end of each episode.
