= Epiphanies (Battlestar Galactica) =

- Battlestar Galactica episode
- Episode no.: Season 2 Episode 13
- Directed by: Rod Hardy
- Written by: Joel Anderson Thompson
- Original air date: January 20, 2006

Guest appearances
- Colm Feore as President Richard Adar; Donnelly Rhodes as Doctor Cottle; Paul Perri as Royan Jahee; Luciana Carro as Louanne "Kat" Katraine; David Richmond-Peck as Naylin Stans; Holly Dignard as Asha Janik

Episode chronology
← Previous "Resurrection Ship"	Next → "Black Market"
- Battlestar Galactica season 2

"Epiphanies" is the thirteenth episode of the second season of the reimagined Battlestar Galactica television series. It aired originally on the Sci Fi Channel on January 20, 2006.

In the episode, President Laura Roslin orders Sharon's pregnancy terminated. The order is suspended after Gaius Baltar discovers that the fetus's blood can cure Roslin's cancer, which it does. Baltar aligns himself with an underground group of Cylon sympathizers whose ranks include the troubled Number Six copy Gina.

== Plot ==
Roslin lies near death in Galactica's sickbay. Doctor Cottle reports abnormalities in Sharon's unborn child's blood. Believing the child a threat to the fleet, Roslin orders her pregnancy terminated over Baltar's objections. Head Six, who regards Sharon's child as hers with Baltar, appears to Baltar and insists he intervene. Roslin's decision outrages Sharon and Helo, the child's father, who obstructs the entrance to sickbay. Baltar defuses the standoff by announcing that a transfusion of the fetus's abnormal blood may save Roslin's life. The procedure cures Roslin's cancer within days.

In a sequence of delirious flashbacks, Roslin recalls negotiating an end to a teachers' strike on Caprica as Secretary of Education. Her conciliatory approach angered then-President Richard Adar, with whom she was having an affair, but she refused to back down. She also recalls seeing Baltar with a Number Six shortly before the Cylon attack on the Twelve Colonies.

A civilian crew member sabotages some ammunition. An investigation reveals she is a member of Demand Peace, an underground group of Cylon sympathizers. Admiral William Adama feigns negotiation with Demand Peace only to arrest its representative, Royan Jahee, when he arrives on Galactica. Demand Peace bombs a fuel refinery ship. Roslin meets with Jahee, agrees to hear his group's case, and warns that further violence will lead to harsh measures.

Baltar meets secretly with Gina on Cloud Nine. Gina rejects his sexual advances but invites him to join Demand Peace; Baltar refuses. Head Six laments that saving Roslin's life prevented Baltar, who is vice president, from becoming president. Baltar concludes from a letter Roslin wrote to him in the event of her death that she will never trust him. Jahee returns to Cloud Nine and presents Gina with a gift from Baltar: a nuclear warhead Adama provided Baltar for research purposes in an earlier episode.

== Analysis ==
In his podcast commentary on "Epiphanies", executive producer Ronald D. Moore discussed his views the episode's portrayal of several of the characters.

- Before becoming President, Roslin would have been horrified by a presidential edict to terminate a pregnancy, but her circumstances have forced her to become gradually more comfortable making tough decisions.
- Gina rejects Baltar sexually because of the abuse she endured while a prisoner on Pegasus; actress Tricia Helfer (Gina/Six) came up with this notion. Gina's unavailability frustrates Baltar, who was motivated to help Gina partially by his desire to sleep with her.
- Helo coming to attention after Adama dismisses him is intended as a genuine gesture of respect.
- Moore speculates that Baltar saves Roslin because he feels unready for the Presidency.

Jacob Clifton of Television Without Pity notes that "Epiphanies" considers a number of "endings" for Roslin: of her cancer, her affair with Adar, her job as Secretary of Education (from which Adar asks her to resign), and the Twelve Colonies. He muses that these are commingled because it can be difficult to separate the big "apocalypses" from the small ones. He compares Roslin's interaction with Jahee to her negotiation with the striking teachers: in both cases she has to protect a constituency (teachers or civilians) in the face of a zealous leader who will happily crush them for misbehavior (Adar or Adama).

Clifton argues that Roslin wants to abort Sharon's fetus not because of a security risk but because the doubts that Baltar could maintain the cover-up of Sharon's presence on Galactica if he became president. He further argues that Adama is ambivalent about carrying out Roslin's order but understands her motivation. Rose Wojnar of The San Diego Union-Tribune notes that the conflict over Roslin's order "mirrors the abortion debate in today's world".

Clifton compares the triad of Roslin, Sharon, and her unborn daughter with the Triple Goddess concept. In a review of a later episode, he says Demand Peace is "right about everything".

== Production ==
Moore described "Epiphanies" as "our biggest Laura Roslin show to date." The writers decided to introduce a cure for Roslin's cancer so they could include her in the rest of the series without progressively worsening her conditions. They also found attractive the idea of complicating Roslin's role as the prophesied leader of humanity, who is supposed to be dying. They considered basing the treatment on embryonic stem cells harvested from the fetus to connect the episode to real-world debates over stem cells, but this was rejected as medically implausible and gimmicky.

Moore felt that the series had not paid enough attention to different points of view within the fleet. Demand Peace was developed to demonstrate dissenting opinions, which Moore regards as inevitable in any body politic. He also considered it "a healthy exercise" for him and the other Battlestar Galactica writers, whom he described as generally liberal, to write an episode whose antagonists belong to the political left. He notes that Adama's harsh treatment of Jahee runs counter to actor Edward James Olmos's politics, as well. However, Moore emphasized in his podcast commentary that the episode, like the rest of the series, is not intended to be polemical or allegorical to real-world events.

The writers considered waiting several episodes before re-introducing Head Six after her disappearance in "Resurrection Ship", but Moore felt that "Baltar was less interesting without Six." Instead they inserted dialogue to indicate that several weeks had passed without Six appearing to Baltar.

The succession letter is based on a real-world tradition in which each outgoing President of the United States leaves a letter for his successor in the Oval Office. The letter that appears in the episode is less complimentary than letters that appeared in early drafts.

Moore confessed it was unrealistic that Demand Peace would not recognize Gina as a Number Six copy despite her eyeglasses and different hairstyle.

== Reception ==
"Epiphanies" received lukewarm critical review. Keith McDuffee of TV Squad called Demand Peace "interesting" but wrote, "After an amazing double-part season premiere ["Resurrection Ship"], the show tones down a little." Amanda Keith of the Los Angeles Newspaper Group called the episode's flaws "numerous". Clifton gave the episode a B−, praising the editing and several actors' performances but mocking the episode's technobabble and "mangled logic". Wojnar gave the episode an A−, citing relief over Roslin's cure but noting "some bad acting and some uneven editing." Simon Brew of Den of Geek praised Mary McDonnell (Roslin)'s performance.

== Connection to other series elements ==
- Gina detonates the warhead in the second-season finale, "Lay Down Your Burdens, Part 2", destroying Cloud Nine and inadvertently signaling the human fleet's position to the other Cylons.
- Roslin's cancer is only in remission; by the third-season finale, "Crossroads, Part 2", it has returned.
