= Home (Battlestar Galactica) =

- Battlestar Galactica episodes
- The night sky in the Tomb of Athena.
- Episode nos.: Season 2 Episodes 6 & 7
- Directed by: Sergio Mimica-Gezzan (Part 1); Jeff Woolnough (Part 2)
- Written by: David Eick (Part 1 & 2); Ronald D. Moore (Part 2)
- Original air dates: August 19, 2005 (Part 1); August 26, 2005 (Part 2)

Guest appearances
- Richard Hatch as Tom Zarek; James Remar as Meier; Lorena Gale as Priestess Elosha (Part 1); Patricia Idlette as Sarah Porter (Part 1); Malcolm Stewart as Marshall Bagot (Part 1); Luciana Carro as Louann "Kat" Katraine (Part 1); Bodie Olmos as Hot Dog (Part 1); Ben Ayres as Lt. George "Catman" Birch (Part 1); Linnea Sharples as Lt. Emmitt "Sweetness" Jones (Part 1); Christina Schild as Playa (Part 1); Biski Gugushe as Sekou Hamilton (Part 1); Raahul Singh as Kimmitt (Part 1); Donnelly Rhodes as Doctor Cottle (Part 2); Leah Cairns as Racetrack (Part 2)

Episode chronology
| ← Previous "The Farm" | Next → "Final Cut" |
- Battlestar Galactica season 2

"Home" is a two-part episode of the reimagined Battlestar Galactica television series. Part 1 aired originally on the Sci Fi Channel on August 19, 2005, and Part 2 aired on August 26, 2005.

In the episode, Starbuck returns to the human fleet bearing the Arrow of Apollo. President Laura Roslin leads a team to the surface of Kobol to find the Tomb of Athena and a map to Earth. Commander William Adama overcomes his anger at Roslin and her allies and joins them on Kobol, where the Tomb provides a clue to Earth's location. The fleet is reunited.

According to executive producer David Eick, who wrote Part 1 and co-wrote Part 2 with executive producer Ronald D. Moore, "Home" is more about character development and relationships than about story. The episode received favorable critical review.

== Plot ==
In the previous episode, "The Farm", Adama returned to command following an assassination attempt by the Galactica copy of Boomer (Galactica-Boomer). Roslin led almost a third of the fleet back to Kobol to search for a way to Earth. Starbuck left Caprica with Helo and the Cylon known until then as the Caprica copy of Boomer (Sharon).

=== Part 1 ===
Roslin struggles to persuade the Quorum of Twelve of Apollo's loyalty. Tom Zarek suggests arming the civilian ships in case Galactica attacks, but Apollo says they would stand no chance against the battlestar. Priestess Elosha reminds everyone that the Scriptures predict that a return to Kobol would result in lives lost.

Starbuck docks with Roslin's flagship. Before she can explain about Caprica-Sharon, Apollo sees her and puts a gun to Caprica-Sharon's head. Helo appears and draws his weapon on Apollo to defend Sharon. Roslin defuses the standoff by promising Sharon will not be harmed but then orders her thrown out the airlock. Roslin only relents when Sharon claims to know the location of the Tomb of Athena, where the Scriptures claim a path to Earth can be found. Roslin threatens to put Helo and Sharon, and thus their unborn child, out the airlock unless Sharon leads them to it.

Privately, Zarek admits to his aide-de-camp, Meier, that he does not share Roslin's religious convictions. They plot to kill Apollo so Zarek can replace him at Roslin's side.

On Kobol, Roslin leads a team that includes Apollo, Starbuck, Sharon, Helo, Zarek, Meier, Elosha, and several guards. Elosha is killed by a land mine. Cylon Centurions ambush the party, who fends them off with the help of Sharon; she grabs a stray grenade launcher and destroys one of the Centurions, to Apollo's surprise.

On Galactica, Commander Adama assesses what resources remain after the defection of part of the fleet to "a religious fanatic and a terrorist", as he describes Roslin and Zarek. He appoints George Birch, an inexperienced but "honest and loyal" pilot, to replace Apollo commanding the Viper pilots; several accidents happen under Birch's leadership. Adama appears before the press; denounces those who followed Roslin, whom he describes as no longer President; and threatens to detain anyone who reports that he does not know where Earth is. Later, he confides in Anastasia "Dee" Dualla how hurt he is by betrayal. Dee replies that he has broken his promise to find the fleet a new home and suggests his hurt has more to do with his own feeling of helplessness than betrayal. Adama dismisses Dee brusquely but later asks for reconnaissance photos of Kobol, promising to reunite the fleet, "our family".

=== Part 2 ===
Head Six tells Gaius Baltar that their child will be born in the cell built for Galactica-Boomer. Baltar loses patience and starts mocking the idea that he could have a child with an imaginary woman. Six dons a casual appearance and tells Baltar that she is nothing more than a coping mechanism created by his subconscious following his participation in the genocide of humanity. She taunts him and encourages him to get a brain scan. Doctor Cottle finds nothing wrong and writes Baltar off as a hypochondriac.

Sharon continues to guide the party on Kobol based on her knowledge of human theology. Apollo remains suspicious of Sharon and Helo, but Starbuck vouches for them. Sharon tells Helo she has many memories as Boomer aboard Galactica and that their child will be female. Meier suggests to Zarek that they frame Sharon for Apollo's murder, but Zarek insists they wait until they've found the Tomb.

Commander Adama arrives on Kobol with Billy Keikeya and Chief Galen Tyrol. Roslin reconciles with Billy. Adama reconciles with Apollo and Starbuck. He attacks Sharon, recalling Galactica-Boomer's betrayal, but is prevented from killing her by chest pain following his surgery. Adama reconciles with Roslin, acknowledges her role in saving his and Apollo's life following the Cylon attack on the Colonies, and joins her quest for the Tomb. Tyrol approaches Sharon uncomfortably; Sharon tells him she "remembers" him and hugs him.

Meier tells Sharon about the murder of Galactica-Boomer and warns her to start looking out for herself and her unborn baby. After Adama arrives, Zarek orders Meier to stop plotting, to no avail. Sharon tells Helo she plans to "take matters into my own hands." Meier provides her a handgun, and she promises to ambush Commander Adama when they reach the Tomb. However, when the time comes, she shoots Meier instead, declares she has no hidden programming like Galactica-Boomer's, and surrenders the weapon to Adama.

Adama orders Tyrol to guard Zarek, Sharon, and Helo and enters the Tomb with Roslin, Apollo, Starbuck, and Billy. Starbuck inserts the Arrow of Apollo into a statue of the archer Sagittaron, triggering a vision of a grassy field under a night sky. The party sees constellations representing each of the Twelve Colonies, and Starbuck realizes they are "standing" on Earth. Apollo recognizes a nebula among the constellations (he says it's the Lagoon Nebula, to which his father Adama says it's Astral Body M8) and concludes the fleet can plot its next direction based on it.

Returning to Galactica, Adama promises to keep the fleet unified and reinstates Roslin as president. Sharon is placed in a cell built for Galactica-Boomer. Helo speaks to Sharon about their baby through a direct phone line. Eavesdropping, Baltar realizes the connection with Six's prediction for their "child". Having ruled out the possibility that Six is created by a chip in his brain, and now concluding from her foreknowledge of Sharon's pregnancy that she cannot just be his own creation, he asks what she is. She answers, "I'm an angel of God sent here to protect you, to guide you, to love you." He asks, "To what end?" She replies, "To the end of the human race."

=== Deleted scenes ===
In a scene deleted from Part 1, Elosha confesses to Roslin that she had lost her faith before the Cylon attack on the Colonies. Seeing the hope in Roslin as Elosha administered Roslin's oath of office restored her faith. In a scene deleted from Part 2, Billy confesses to Roslin that he is an atheist but says he is joining her on Kobol because he believes in her and Commander Adama.

== Characterization ==
Eick says "Home" is more about character development and relationships than about story. Susan Tankersley of Television Without Pity agrees, comparing the episode to "a long family car trip." Jason Davis of Mania notes that Apollo and Starbuck act like children with one another and connects their behavior to "their damaged social development".

Eick said that actor Edward James Olmos (Commander Adama) helped him craft the encounter between Adama and Sharon by saying that he expected Adama would try to kill any Number Eight copy he met. Moore said Olmos "did your [Eick's] homework", and Eick agreed.

Moore and Eick view Adama and Roslin's reconciliation scene as a different tone for the characters, who to this point had only shared, in Eick's words, "stiff pleasantries". By the end of the scene, they are calling each other by their first names, something the characters had not done before.

Moore says that during "Home" Helo begins to develop "conflicted loyalties".

== Production ==
"Home" was the first teleplay written by Eick. Director Sergio Mimica-Gezzan told him the episode was too long, so the production team petitioned the Sci Fi network to let them split it into two parts. Once the network signed off, the writers had very little time to craft enough material to fill both episodes. The split also allowed them to spend more time on Apollo and Starbuck's reunion and Adama and Roslin's reunion. In Eick's view, this was important because of the episode's emphasis on the characters.

=== Part 1 ===
The writers decided to have Elosha die in "Home" because they felt it was important that Roslin pay a personal price for leading the pilgrimage to Kobol. They considered having Billy die instead or as well, but ultimately they decided to kill only Elosha to symbolize the end of Roslin's journey to religious awakening. The writers also anticipated Roslin rebuilding her relationship with Adama and returning to political rather than religious leadership in later episodes, and Elosha represented changes in the opposite direction.

In the script, Birch's mistakes rather than Dee's entreaty were the cause for Adama to change his mind and travel to Kobol. The scene between Adama and Dee and the scene with Birch's biggest mistake were swapped during editing. An artifact of this change is that Adama enters the CIC for the Birch mistake scene followed by Dee.

When Starbuck first appears on Roslin's ship, Apollo kisses her. This was actor Jamie Bamber (Apollo)'s idea. Bamber and actress Katee Sackhoff ad-libbed some of Apollo and Starbuck's dialogue in "Home".

The mechanics of the land mine that kills Elosha were inspired by the S-mines deployed by Nazi Germany during World War II. The shot of the mine bounding into the air was filmed conventionally, without visual effects.

=== Part 2 ===
Shooting for Part 2 proceeded slowly because of the large number of exterior shots and the size of the cast in those shots. The writers compensated by putting the actors in pairs or small groups where possible so the director would only need a few of them at a time. Nonetheless, Eick called "Home, Part 2" the most difficult episode in the series up to that point to produce, with the possible exception of the first-season finale, "Kobol's Last Gleaming".

Executive producer Ronald D. Moore compared the teaser of Part 2, which intercuts between Roslin's party following scriptural clues to find the Tomb and Adama using scriptural clues to guess Roslin's location, to the teaser of "Kobol's Last Gleaming, Part 1", which also features intercuts.

The writers had considered having Head Six tell Baltar he's crazy during the first season but never managed to fit it into any of that season's episodes. Splitting "Home" into two episodes created the space they needed to incorporate the idea into the episode. They considered having Baltar visit Sharon in her cell and replacing Six with a vision of Sharon in this episode.

Adama and Billy's skin ripples as their Raptor enters the Kobol atmosphere. Eick had seen the effect in the film Moonraker and wanted it in the episode. The effect was achieved with an air blaster, the same way as in Moonraker, despite some danger for the actors.

The party enters the Tomb cave by pushing a boulder out of the way, but only after Starbuck tries and fails to open the cave by waving the Arrow of Apollo around. Eick felt that the finished episode did not convey Starbuck's initial disappointment after having gone through so much to bring the Arrow from Caprica.

The writers went through several versions of what the party would learn in the Tomb. First they thought that the Arrow itself could be a map to Earth, but they dismissed that because it didn't mandate a journey to Kobol. Then they considered having the party's investigation interrupted by a Cylon attack that would prevent them from learning Earth's exact location; this was abandoned because it seemed unnecessary and because the visual effects would have been too expensive.

== Reception ==
Critical reception to "Home" was favorable. Tankersley gave Part 1 an A− and Part 2 a B. Davis gave Part 1 an A− and part 2 an A, calling Sharon's betrayal of Meier in favor of Adama "one of the best executed pieces of writing seen on television in years." Simon Brew of Den of Geek was less enthusiastic, criticizing the episode's pace but nonetheless calling it "some smashing viewing."

== Connections to other series elements ==
- Moore and Eick said that "Home" resolves much of the conflict that began in "Kobol's Last Gleaming". In this sense they considered it the true end of the first season.
- In the third-season episode "Torn", Head Six reaffirms her self-description as an angel sent to protect Baltar.
- In "The Farm", Starbuck promised Sam Anders she would return to Caprica and rescue him. In "Home", she encourages Roslin to plan a rescue mission to Caprica.
- In the original series episode "Lost Planet of the Gods", Commander Adama discovers Kobol and tries to decipher ancient clues to finding Earth.

== Film homages ==
Starbuck playing with her Pyramid ball is an homage to Steve McQueen's character in The Great Escape. The shot of Six sitting naked on a backward chair is an homage to Scandal. The scene in which the Galactica crew applauds Roslin is an homage to Brubaker.

== Astronomy ==
The constellations Roslin identifies in the Tomb correspond to the real Zodiacal constellations. Moore and Eick concede that all twelve of these constellations cannot be viewed simultaneously in the night sky but say it would be disorienting for the audience to rotate the sky throughout the scene in a way that would make the representation faithful. They also concede that the constellations shown in the episode do not resemble real constellations.

Apollo identifies the nebula as the Lagoon Nebula, in the constellation Scorpio. His father refers to it as "Astral Body M8." The real Lagoon Nebula has Messier designation M8 but is located in Sagittarius, not Scorpius.
