= Downloaded (Battlestar Galactica) =

- Battlestar Galactica episode
- Caprica-Six with Number Three and a hallucination of Gaius Baltar
- Episode no.: Season 2 Episode 18
- Directed by: Jeff Woolnough
- Written by: Bradley Thompson; David Weddle
- Original air date: February 24, 2006

Guest appearances
- Lucy Lawless as Number Three; Michael Trucco as Samuel Anders; Erica Cerra as Maya; Matthew Bennett as Number Five

Episode chronology
← Previous "The Captain's Hand"	Next → "Lay Down Your Burdens"
- Battlestar Galactica season 2

"Downloaded" is the eighteenth episode of the second season of the reimagined Battlestar Galactica television series. It aired originally on the Sci Fi Channel on February 24, 2006.

The episode takes place alongside the rest of the re-imagined series, with 49,579 human survivors left in the Fleet. The episode primarily details the lives of two specific Cylon models after their apparent destruction who were declared Cylon heroes. One model is "Caprica-Six", the copy of Number Six who was responsible for disabling the Colonial defense system prior to the events of the miniseries. The other model is Sharon "Boomer" Valerii, a sleeper agent who was a member of the crew of Galactica and shot Adama twice in the chest.

The concept of a Cylon-centric episode was proposed long before the episode aired, in an episode which would have seen the Cylons discuss their equivalent of the "Final Solution". "Downloaded" instead focuses on showing the personality of the Cylon race, in particular, Caprica-Six and Boomer. The episode was universally well-received despite its unconventional format.

== Plot ==
The episode primarily takes place on Cylon-occupied Caprica. After the Fall of the Twelve Colonies, the copy of Number Six (Tricia Helfer) that was responsible for disabling the Colonial defense system (affectionately known as "Caprica-Six") and Sharon "Boomer" Valerii (Grace Park), after being shot by Specialist Cally ("Resistance") were both "downloaded": a standard Cylon practice of rebirth which takes place if a model is to perish, and have both been hailed as Cylon heroes due to their efforts in infiltrating human society.

Both are having difficulties in adjusting to life on Caprica. In particular, Caprica-Six is having visions of Gaius Baltar (James Callis) that only she can see, much like Baltar's Inner Six, and Boomer is having problems accepting her Cylon nature to the point of the denial, even in danger of being "boxed", which means storing a Cylon's memories without consciousness out of its body. Number Three (Lucy Lawless) asks Caprica-Six to help Boomer in this regard. However, when Caprica-Six starts to associate more with Boomer, they both realize that the holocaust the Cylons effected was a sin. They also come to the conclusion that due to their unique perspectives, Number Three is searching for a reason to box them both, fearing their acquired humanity a flawed corruption.

Caprica-Six and Boomer are next shown conversing with Number Three. While the three move up a stairwell, explosives set by the resistance led by Samuel Anders (Michael Trucco) detonate, trapping Anders, Three, Boomer, and Caprica-Six in a parking garage. While Anders is originally shielded and hidden by the blast, Caprica-Six breaks her leg. Number Three offers to euthanize her, but Caprica-Six refuses as she suspects that Number Three will take the opportunity to box her. Shortly afterwards, the three find Anders who Number Three intends to kill before being stopped by Boomer and Caprica-Six. As Number Three goads them, Boomer and Caprica-Six understand that their unique view of humanity through their love for Baltar and Galen Tyrol gives them a perspective that makes them a threat to the Cylon status-quo. When Number Three attempts to kill Anders, she is killed by Caprica-Six who, along with Boomer, allow Anders to escape. Recognizing that it will take some time for Number Three to resurrect and report them, Caprica-Six and Boomer form a pact to change the Cylon perspective of humanity together before finally being rescued from the collapsed parking garage by the other Cylons.

The episode's secondary plot takes place on Galactica. The copy of Number Eight that defected from the Cylons gives birth by cesarian section to a baby who she and Karl Agathon (Tahmoh Penikett) call "Hera". However, President Laura Roslin, and her secretary, Tory Foster, and Dr. Cottle conspire to fake Hera's death fearing what would happen if the Cylons knew the child lived. President Roslin also did not want Hera to be raised by her Cylon mother, Sharon, whom she still does not trust. At the end of the episode, the child is given to a woman who believes the child was born on Pegasus, while Helo and Chief Tyrol (Aaron Douglas) scatter the ashes they believe to be Hera's into space. Inner Six is outraged at Gaius for not preventing the death of "their child" and swears "God's vengeance on the entire human race for that monstrous, unforgivable sin."

=== Deleted scenes ===
In a deleted subplot for the episode, Baltar enlists the Number Six copy known as Gina to steal Hera. Gina conspires with the fleet copy of Number Three previously seen in "Final Cut," only to have Hera "die" before the abduction can be carried out.

== Production ==
The concept of a Cylon-perspective episode was originally proposed for an episode called "The Raid", which would have consisted on a Cylon meeting not unlike the Wannsee Conference, but was dropped as the equivalent "final solution" had already happened during the miniseries. Nevertheless, Sci-Fi liked the concept, and commissioned this episode.

A major theme of the episode is the humanization of "Caprica-Six" – while Caprica-Six shows her manipulative streak in parts of the episode, in particular during her conversation in the beach-side house with Boomer, the destruction of the Twelve Colonies and her love of Baltar have somewhat changed her psychology. Conversely, Boomer shows resistance to her Cylon nature. Series creator Ronald D. Moore found the scene that took place in Boomer's apartment interesting as it showed a major amount of her backstory. It also serves the purpose of Boomer's denial that her memories were manufactured, and that the Cylons are more passive than humans. Another major subplot is the "Virtual Baltar" only visible by Caprica-Six, which Moore commented was a "delicious symmetry" to Baltar's "Virtual Six". Both were intended to show how the couple had been changed through experience, in particular, the events of the miniseries.

Several scenes were cut from the episode. Of these, the most notable is an entire subplot centering on Gina and D'Anna kidnapping Hera Agathon, which was excised as Moore felt there would be "too many Cylons".

The production team also had significant problems with the scenes in the parking garage, and how to avoid the anatopism of contemporary cars being found on Caprica. In order to avoid this, the production team used cars mostly found in Eastern Europe, for the purpose that the audience would not immediately recognise the types of cars, but still to keep a sense of realism.

== Reception ==
Ronald D. Moore stated that "Downloaded" is his favorite episode of the series, and especially admired the acting of Park, Helfer, and Callis, the latter especially for his change in role. Jacob Clifton of Television Without Pity gave the episode an "A+" rating. Keith McDuffee of TV Squad commented that the episode was "perfect", and made up for any issues he had about the show before the episode. He found the storyline concerning the birth of Hera Agathon, the hybrid baby, a "clever twist", and appreciated the episode's general Cylon perspective. The Chicago Tribune praised Park, Helfer, and Lawless' acting and the appearance of Dr. Cottle, and concluded by saying that it was well-crafted and added to the "deftly drawn moral confusion" over whether the Cylons were good or evil. The episode was nominated by the World Science Fiction Society for the 2007 Best Dramatic Presentation, Short Form, an award that was won by the Doctor Who episode "The Girl in the Fireplace".
