= Resurrection Ship =

- Battlestar Galactica episodes
- Admiral Helena Cain (Michelle Forbes) in her quarters shortly before being shot by Gina (Tricia Helfer)
- Episode nos.: Season 2 Episodes 11 & 12
- Directed by: Michael Rymer
- Written by: Michael Rymer (Part 2); Ronald D. Moore (Part 2)
- Story by: Anne Cofell Saunders (Part 1)
- Teleplay by: Michael Rymer (Part 1)
- Original air dates: January 6, 2006 (Part 1); January 13, 2006 (Part 2)

Guest appearances
- Michelle Forbes as Admiral Helena Cain; Donnelly Rhodes as Doctor Cottle (Part 1); Graham Beckel as Colonel Jack Fisk; John Pyper-Ferguson as Cole "Stinger" Taylor (Part 1); Sebastian Spence as Narcho; Luciana Carro as Louanne "Kat" Katraine; Vincent Gale as Chief Peter Laird; Peter-John Prinsloo as Lieutenant Mei "Freaker" Firelli; Mike Dopud as Gage; Brad Dryborough as Lieutenant Louis Hoshi

Episode chronology
← Previous "Pegasus"	Next → "Epiphanies"
- Battlestar Galactica season 2

"Resurrection Ship" is a two-part episode of the reimagined Battlestar Galactica television series. Part 1 aired originally on the Sci Fi Channel on January 6, 2006, and Part 2 aired on January 13, 2006. It was the first episode broadcast after a hiatus following the broadcast of the previous episode, "Pegasus", on September 23, 2005.

In the episode, Admiral Helena Cain and Commander William Adama call a truce but plan to assassinate each other. The humans destroy a Cylon fleet that includes a resurrection ship. Cain and Adama both cancel their plots, but Gina escapes from the Pegasus brig and kills Cain.

"Resurrection Ship" received positive critical reviews.

== Plot ==
In "The Farm", Starbuck promised Sam Anders she would return to Caprica to rescue him. In "Pegasus", Apollo and Starbuck plotted to steal the stealth-capable Blackbird to obtain reconnaissance photos of a mysterious ship escorted by a large Cylon fleet. Cain sentenced Helo and Chief Galen Tyrol to death for accidentally killing an officer to rescue Sharon. Adama ordered Galactica's Vipers launched toward Pegasus, and Cain ordered the Pegasus Vipers to intercept them.

=== Part 1 ===
Both Viper groups seek permission to fire, but neither Cain nor Adama grants it. The standoff is interrupted by Starbuck, who returns in the Blackbird with photos of the Cylon vessel. Cain and Adama call off their attacks and agree to meet on Colonial One as neutral ground. President Laura Roslin mediates an uneasy truce: the resolution of Helo and Tyrol's fate will be delayed until after the attack on the Cylon fleet. Later, Roslin warns Adama privately that Cain will strike against Adama again and urges him to assassinate Cain first. Adama demurs.

Impressed by what she calls Starbuck's "guts and initiative", Cain promotes her to captain and appoints her Pegasus CAG. Starbuck persuades Cain to reinstate Apollo's flight status though she demotes Apollo to Lieutenant and relegates him to delivery runs. Cain also promises Starbuck she will lead the fleet back to Caprica, destroy the Cylons, and rescue the survivors.

Doctor Cottle says Sharon will be all right. Adama apologizes to Sharon and orders her returned to her cell.

In Gina's cell, Cain abuses the Cylon prisoner. Gina begs Gaius Baltar to kill her. She tells him that the Cylon vessel is a "resurrection ship", where Cylons are downloaded into new bodies; if it is destroyed Gina can die permanently. Cain resolves to destroy the ship, believing mortality will deter the Cylon pursuit.

Colonel Jack Fisk tells Colonel Saul Tigh that Pegasus encountered a small civilian fleet. Cain ordered it stripped for parts, impressed some civilian personnel, executed the families of any who resisted, and abandoned the rest in space. Realizing that Roslin is right about Cain, Adama orders Starbuck to assassinate Cain once the attack on the Cylon fleet concludes. Likewise, Cain directs Fisk to take a detachment of Marines to Galactica to kill Adama after the attack.

=== Part 2 ===
Two Pegasus crewmen confront Helo and Tyrol in the Pegasus brig and beat them with soap bars wrapped in towels; Fisk discovers the blanket party and ends it. Cain warns Starbuck not to let her conscience dictate how she behaves at difficult moments. Apollo agrees to help Starbuck with the assassination but expresses discomfort to his father. Adama invites Sharon to his quarters and asks why the Cylons hate humans; she replies that the Cylons don't hate humans but think them unworthy of life because of their tendency toward murder. As the battle nears, Starbuck and Fisk wish each other "good hunting".

The battle begins. Piloting the Blackbird, Apollo destroys the FTL drive on the resurrection ship, preventing it from escaping but is forced to eject after a damaged Colonial Raptor collides with the Blackbird. His spacesuit leaks oxygen and Apollo hallucinates before eventually allowing himself to suffocate. However, a search and rescue Raptor piloted by Racetrack locates Apollo and is able to revive him. The humans destroy the resurrection ship and the two Basestars guarding it. Cain and Adama contact Fisk and Starbuck respectively, but neither gives the order to assassinate. Both relieved, Fisk and Starbuck stand down.

Baltar signals his rejection of Head Six in favor of Gina by repeating to Gina a coquettish speech Head Six gave earlier. Baltar distracts the Marine guard so that Gina can kill him and take his side arm. Gina asks Baltar to kill her, but he urges her to seek justice, not death, and promises to hide her. Cain returns to her quarters following the battle to find Gina lying in wait for her. Gina shoots Cain and disappears.

Fisk and Starbuck eulogize Cain at her funeral. Fisk becomes Commander of Pegasus. Apollo confesses to Starbuck that he wanted to die in space. Helo and Tyrol return to Galactica. Helo and Sharon are reunited as Tyrol looks on. Recognizing that Adama now commands two battlestars, Roslin promotes him to Admiral. Adama helps the ailing Roslin to her feet and kisses her.

== Analysis ==
Instead of giving Starbuck the order to kill Cain, Adama muses, "It's not enough to survive. One has to be worthy of surviving." In Moore's view, this reflects "one of the key tenets of the show." Clifton compares the conflict between Cain's urge to fight the Cylons and Roslin and Adama's commitment to maintaining civil society to the struggle between Adama and Roslin in the miniseries over whether to fight the Cylons or flee.

Jason Davis of Mania writes that mortality is a central theme of "Resurrection Ship". He cites Adama and Cain's assassination plots and their regrets over them, Adama inspecting his surgical scar, Starbuck and Fisks's mutual wishes of "good hunting", and Apollo and Gina's death wishes.

Clifton argues that Cain's decision to execute Helo and Tyrol is correct given the position she is in. In his view, the audience's prejudices in favor of the two men do not apply to her character because she does not know them. Clifton argues further that Roslin pushes for Adama to assassinate Cain because she expects her cancer to kill her soon and considers Baltar, who as vice president would succeed her, unfit to stand up to Cain.

Moore notes that Cain accomplished all her goals except for her own survival. Clifton compares her pursuit of the Cylons to Captain Ahab's pursuit of Moby-Dick.

In Moore's view, the audience is supposed to feel ambivalent about Gina. On one hand, she perpetrated genocide along with the rest of her kind. On the other hand, her situation inspires sympathy.

=== Characterization ===
In his podcast commentaries on "Resurrection Ship", executive producer Ronald D. Moore discussed his views of what the episode's events reveal about several of the characters.

- Cain's decision not to kill Adama demonstrates that she is "human and... not a black-hatted villain."
- Baltar telling Head Six that he is bored of his fantasy house reflects his growing preference for Gina.
- Though Baltar has real feelings for Gina, his speech to her is "based on a lie, which is at the heart of a lot of things that Baltar’s about."
- Apollo's experience with hypoxia affects his character strongly and influences him for the rest of the second season.
- Adama's initial reaction to Roslin's assassination proposal reflects a reversal of what Moore considers the expected roles of a hawkish Adama and a dovish Roslin.
- Adama's promotion is a sort of parting gift from Roslin, as she expects she will die soon.

In his reviews of "Resurrection Ship", Jacob Clifton of Television Without Pity discussed his own views on the characters.

- Cain's actions in "Resurrection Ship" provide context for her actions in "Pegasus" and make her character "not sympathetic, but understandable" in the mold of Colonel Kurtz. However, the contrast between Cain's decision to pillage her civilian fleet and Adama's decision to protect his reflects "an issue of character rather than humanizing circumstance" (emphasis Clifton's).
- Gina's ability to free Baltar from Head Six represents an opportunity to redeem him; Clifton compares Baltar and Gina's relationship with Angel and Darla's in the television series Buffy the Vampire Slayer and Angel.
- Gina's desire to die represents a profound break from the Cylons' religiosity.
- Adama's relationship with Sharon is evolving. In "Resurrection Ship" he calls her "she" and "her"; in previous episodes he had called her "it".
- Starbuck is conflicted over her loyalty to Adama and Apollo and her hope that Cain will help her rescue Anders. Her improved "demeanor, behavior and even appearance" demonstrate her determination to perform well as CAG.
- Usually Head Six has control when Baltar speaks to her and a third party simultaneously, but the power dynamic is reversed when he talks to Gina.

Amanda Keith of the Los Angeles Newspaper Group disputes Starbuck's assertion in the eulogy that the fleet was safer with Cain in command; Keith attributes Starbuck's assessment to dissatisfaction with Adama and Roslin's leadership and ignorance of Cain's past misdeeds. Keith also believes Roslin is mistaken in her assessment of Cain as irredeemable; after all, Cain did back down from killing Adama.

Keith writes that Baltar believes he can reclaim his missing love by rescuing Gina, but Gina is too "broken" to reciprocate his feelings. Keith compares Baltar's fancy on this point to Cain's impossible dream of reclaiming the irradiated Twelve Colonies from the Cylons. She regards Baltar's actions in the episode as irresponsible and driven by his exclusive focus on his immediate surroundings.

Jennifer Stoy cites Roslin's call for Cain's assassination to argue that Battlestar Galactica challenges gender stereotypes, at least in its early seasons.

== Production ==
"Resurrection Ship" was originally written and shot as a single episode, with the assassination plots hatched at the end of the second act. After editing the episode was still about 20 minutes too long, so it was split. This allowed for more detail within each part and caused plans for a clip show later in the second season to be scrapped. Part 2 opens with several shots of Apollo imagining floating in water as he drifts in space; this would have opened the single episode. Director Michael Rymer came up with the specific imagery of Apollo floating on his back.

The writers decided on Cain's fate in early drafts of "Resurrection Ship". They also decided early on to allow Pegasus to remain in the fleet; Moore believed this would subvert the audience's expectation that the more powerful battlestar would be destroyed at the end of the episode. Originally the conflict between Cain and Adama was to center around Cain's failure to protect civilian decoys during the battle with the Cylons despite a promise to Roslin. At one point during writing, the script explained why Roslin does not promote Adama over Cain to defuse the situation: Roslin knows Cain does not accept her authority as president and would not obey Adama's orders.

Apollo's experience ejecting and witnessing the destruction of the enemy ships was based on the experience of George H. Gay, Jr., in the Battle of Midway during World War II. Plans to include footage of the wrecked Raptor and its dead personnel along with Apollo were scrapped due to the difficulty of creating the shots and the feeling that it would be too morbid. Plans for additional action in Apollo's swimming fantasy were abandoned as "too esoteric".

Gina was initially scripted to embrace and kiss Baltar. This was removed after actress Tricia Helfer (Six/Gina) noted that Gina, a victim of serial rape, would not be willing to do this.

A scene in Part 1 in which Helo and Tyrol discuss Sharon and the blanket party scene in Part 2 used to be the same scene; the characters are in the same physical positions at the end of the first and the start of the second. The scenes were split when the episode was split. The blanket party was inspired by the films Full Metal Jacket and The Grifters. The writers referred to the Pegasus crewmen administering the beatings as the "Yee-Haw Boys"; in the episode Helo calls them "the Sunshine Boys". Their confrontation with Fisk was inspired by Moore's own experience in the U.S. Navy ROTC.

The kiss between Adama and Roslin was not scripted. Actor Edward James Olmos (Adama) improvised it on set. Actress Mary McDonnell (Roslin)'s surprise is genuine.

The Viper standoff was especially time-consuming to write and film. The writers considered having the Vipers open fire shortly before Starbuck appears, but they feared the consequences for morale and cohesion in the fleet.

Cain's code word "Case Orange" for Fisk to kill Adama refers to War Plan Orange, a contingency plan developed by the American military before the Second World War in case of a Japanese attack. Cain's specific directive to "terminate Adama's command, starting with Adama" is an homage to a line delivered by Harrison Ford's character in Apocalypse Now referring to Kurtz. Adama's code word "Downfall" for Starbuck to kill Cain refers to the German film of that name or possibly Operation Downfall, the planned Allied invasion of Japan at the end of the Second World War.

== Reception ==
"Resurrection Ship" received positive critical reviews. Keith McDuffee of TV Squad called the episode "amazing" and praised the scenes between Baltar and Gina, Apollo's swimming fantasy, and the special effects. Amanda Keith called Part 1 "a fantastic episode" and praised the battle, composer Bear McCreary's score, and Adama and Roslin's final scene in Part 2. Jacob Clifton gave Part 1 an A, praising the moral ambiguity around Cain's actions, Olmos's performance, the editing of the final scene in which Cain and Adama give their assassination orders, and Starbuck, Adama, and Fisk's reluctance to participate in the assassination plots. He gave Part 2 an A+, calling actress Michelle Forbes (Cain)'s performance "wonderful", the battle scenes "awesome", the battle music "[g]rand, wonderful, sad and angry and terrible", and the final scene between Adama and Roslin "candid and weird and perfect and sad." Jason Davis gave Part 1 an A+ and Part 2 an A, praising Rymer's writing and Forbes's performance. Simon Brew of Den of Geek lauded the battle scene but said the rest of the episode was even better; he called it "all the more impressive for not doing what you'd expect it to do." Rose Wojnar of The San Diego Union-Tribune gave Part 1 an A− but Part 2 a B−, praising Forbes and Sackhoff's acting and the battle scene but calling Gina killing Cain "too good of a solution".

John Kubicek of BuddyTV ranked "Resurrection Ship" as the series's 18th best episode. Eric Goldman of IGN ranked "Admiral Cain's reign" in "Pegasus" and "Resurrection Ship" second on his list of the series's top "storylines and moments", praising Forbes's performance and calling the three episodes "riveting".

== Connection to other series elements ==
More of Battlestar Pegasus's backstory is presented in the television movie Battlestar Galactica: Razor:

- Cain and Gina were lovers until the Cylon attack on the Colonies.
- The raids on the civilian ships are shown exactly as Fisk describes them in "Resurrection Ship".

The "Sunshine Boys" were introduced in "Pegasus" bragging about raping Gina and plans to rape Sharon. They resurface in the fourth-season episode "The Oath", in which they take Sharon, Helo, Tyrol, and others prisoner during a mutiny.
