= Final Cut (Battlestar Galactica) =

- Battlestar Galactica episode
- D'Anna Biers (Lucy Lawless) interviewing Colonel Saul Tigh
- Episode no.: Season 2 Episode 8
- Directed by: Robert M. Young
- Written by: Mark Verheiden
- Original air date: September 9, 2005

Guest appearances
- Kate Vernon as Ellen Tigh; Donnelly Rhodes as Doctor Cottle; Matthew Bennett as Number Five; Lucy Lawless as D'Anna Biers (special guest star); Luciana Carro as Louann "Kat" Katraine; Bodie Olmos as Hot Dog; Flick Harrison as Bell; Kevan Kase as Pvt. Scott Kelso; Ty Olsson as Capt. Aaron Kelly; Leah Cairns as Racetrack; Jeremy Guilbaut as Lt. Joe "Hammerhead" Palladino

Episode chronology
← Previous "Home"	Next → "Flight of the Phoenix"
- Battlestar Galactica season 2

"Final Cut" is the eighth episode of the second season of the reimagined Battlestar Galactica television series. It aired originally on the Sci Fi Channel on September 9, 2005.

In the episode, journalist D'Anna Biers tapes a report on life aboard Galactica and uncovers a plot against Colonel Saul Tigh. She discovers the pregnant Number Eight copy (Sharon) being held secretly aboard the ship, but Commander William Adama forbids her to include it in her final report. However, Biers is a Cylon, and she shares the footage of Sharon with her Cylon brethren.

"Final Cut" received mixed critical reception.

== Plot ==
In "Resistance", Tigh ordered supplies taken by force from civilian ships. On the civilian ship Gideon, Marines commanded by Lieutenant Joe Palladino opened fire on a hostile but unarmed crowd of civilians, killing four.

Biers is preparing a report on what she calls the "Gideon massacre." Hoping to influence Biers to produce a more "balanced" report, Adama grants her unrestricted access to document life aboard Galactica.

Biers conducts frank interviews with crew members and captures some pilots' hijinks on camera. After Kat overdoses on stimulants and botches a landing, Biers follows her to Galactica's sickbay. There, she discovers Doctor Cottle treating Sharon for a complication with her pregnancy. Adama confiscates the footage, but Biers secretly keeps a copy. She then records the crew during a successful defense against incoming Cylon Raiders and uncovers a disgruntled Palladino as the perpetrator of death threats and an assassination attempt on Tigh.

In her final report, Biers describes arriving on Galactica with a bias against the crew but changing her mind. Pleased with the report, Adama recommends it be shown throughout the fleet. On Caprica, several Cylons also watch the report, as well as the secret footage of Sharon. It is then revealed that Biers herself is a Cylon as another copy sits with the other Cylons. The Raider attack was so that the footage could be transmitted to the Cylons. Biers confirms that both Sharon and her child survived and calls the child "a miracle from God."

=== Deleted scene ===
In a scene deleted from the final episode, President Laura Roslin is shown coming up with the idea of inviting Biers to Galactica. She is motivated by the upcoming presidential election and demands from the Quorum of Twelve for an investigation of the Gideon incident.

== Analysis ==
I'm sick to death of people like you questioning my patriotism. We all want this fleet to survive.

— D'Anna Biers to Commander Adama

Jason Davis of Mania said the episode contrasts "the essential conservatism of the military... with the naturally liberal notions of the media." He also singles out Helo's observation during his interview with Biers that combat training seeks to make soldiers less human. Davis views this as part of an argument by the series's writers that humans and Cylons are similar. Lynnette R. Porter, David Lavery, and Hillary Robson agree that this "goes to the core of the series' major themes".

Susan A. George views Adama's request for a report that shows the positive and negative sides of his crew as parallel to the series's nuanced depiction of humanity.

== Production ==
=== Writing ===
The writers had been considering writing an episode focusing on a journalist aboard Galactica since the first season. Director Robert M. Young, who directed the first-season episode "Six Degrees of Separation", was brought back to direct "Final Cut" because of his experience as a documentarian. Executive producer David Eick had worked with actress Lucy Lawless (Biers) on the series Xena: Warrior Princess and tried to find a role for her in the first season. Lawless declined due to other commitments but agreed when offered the role in "Final Cut". Executive producer Ronald D. Moore cites journalist Christiane Amanpour as a model for Biers's character.

Biers's monologue at the end of her report, in which she acknowledges the crew's imperfections but lauds their heroism and resilience, reflects Moore's own "thesis of the show."

In the episode, Biers interviews a number of secondary characters, including Anastasia "Dee" Dualla, Racetrack, and Lieutenant Felix Gaeta. Moore encouraged the actors playing these characters (in these cases, Kandyse McClure, Leah Cairns, and Alessandro Juliani, respectively) to improvise their interviews extensively and teach him "things I didn't know about these people that I created." This is also the first time Dualla and Gaeta's first names are presented to the audience.

Moore considers the episode to be mainly a character piece about Galactica's crew. He said that the subplot focusing on Palladino's threats against Tigh serves only to inject what he considered was a baseline level of tension required in a television episode and admitted that he was never satisfied with it. The first draft had Palladino shooting himself at the end of his confrontation with Tigh, but the writers considered this "gratuitous" and rewrote it to have Marines arrest him instead.

=== Filming ===
According to Moore, the decision not to include any exterior shots during the battle with the Raiders was a creative choice. Showing the reactions in the CIC and hangar deck to the pilots' audio transmissions was, in his view, truer to the episode's documentary style.

Flick Harrison, the actor who plays Biers's cameraman, is a cameraman in real life. His camera is also real, and he shot some of the footage in "Final Cut" with it.

=== Music ===
At the end of Biers's report, a part of the "Colonial Anthem" from the original Battlestar Galactica plays over images of Galactica crew members. Composer Bear McCreary collaborated with Stu Phillips, who wrote "Colonial Anthem", to produce the track. McCreary called the collaboration "one of the highlights of the second season."

== Reception ==
"Final Cut" received mixed critical reception. Davis gave the episode an A−, praising Lawless's performance in particular. Simon Brew appreciated the surprise reveal of Biers as a Cylon but criticized numerous other elements of the episode. Susan Tankersley of Television Without Pity gave "Final Cut" a C, saying that Moore's premise that the characters are "flawed but heroic" had been evident from the beginning of the series and did not require a dedicated episode. Jacob Clifton of Television Without Pity wrote in a review of a later episode that "'Final Cut' wasn't that bad—I liked it a lot, actually, and it's still better than most things you can see on the TV." He later compared it favorably to the episodes "Litmus", "The Farm", and "Scar"; he gave the last of these an A−.

Porter, Lavery, and Robson called "Final Cut" "one of [the series's] best episodes" but called the Palladino subplot "mostly routine". John Kubicek of BuddyTV ranked "Final Cut" as the 20th best episode of the re-imagined Battlestar Galactica and called the episode "fascinating".
