= Lay Down Your Burdens =

- Battlestar Galactica episodes
- Episode nos.: Season 2 Episodes 19 & 20
- Directed by: Michael Rymer
- Written by: Ronald D. Moore (Part 1); Anne Cofell Saunders (Part 2); Mark Verheiden (Part 2)
- Original air dates: March 3, 2006; March 10, 2006

Guest appearances
- Dean Stockwell as Brother Cavil; Leah Cairns as Racetrack; Richard Hatch as Tom Zarek; Michael Trucco as Samuel Anders; Rekha Sharma as Tory Foster; Erica Cerra as Maya; Callum Keith Rennie as Number Two

Episode chronology
| ← Previous "Downloaded" | Next → "Occupation" |
- Battlestar Galactica season 2

"Lay Down Your Burdens" is the two-part second-season finale of the reimagined Battlestar Galactica television series. Part 1 aired originally on the Sci Fi Channel on March 3, 2006; Part 2 aired on March 10, 2006, as a 90-minute special.

The episode focuses on the discovery of a harsh but habitable planet and the election of Gaius Baltar as the new President of the Twelve Colonies of Kobol, running on a platform of settling the survivors of Twelve Colonies on the planet, naming it New Caprica.

== Plot ==
=== Part 1 ===
Captain Starbuck is green-lit to lead a group of 20 Raptors back to Caprica to rescue the human resistance led by Samuel Anders. The team utilizes a captured Cylon navigation device wired into the Cylon prisoner Sharon Agathon, to increase the Raptors' jump range allowing them to get back to Caprica in only ten jumps. On the first jump however, they lose track of a Raptor piloted by Racetrack, whose mis-jump causes her to arrive inside a nebula. Debating with her ECO whether or not to try to catch up with the others, they stumble across a planet hidden in the nebula that, although somewhat harsh, can support human life.

Vice President Gaius Baltar finds himself behind in the polls with two weeks remaining until the presidential election. Once Racetrack returns with data on the new planet, Tom Zarek realizes that it provides a crucial election issue: an opportunity for permanent colonization. He convinces Baltar to push the idea in his campaign, believing that people cooped up in the fleet for nine months will support it overwhelmingly. President Laura Roslin suspects that the Cylons may already know of the hidden world and that their stay should only be long enough to gather fresh water and to grow food supplies.

In Galactica's hangar, Chief Galen Tyrol is found after sleepwalking, restlessly asleep on the deck by Specialist Cally. He snaps and violently assaults her after she wakes him. He later seeks religious counseling from a priest named Brother Cavil. Tyrol explains his dreams of jumping off a hangar bay catwalk to his death. Cavil believes it is Tyrol's subconscious desire to kill himself manifested from a fear that he too could be a Cylon "sleeper agent" like Boomer. When Tyrol asks how Brother Cavil can be so certain he is actually human, Cavil sarcastically - if ambiguously - reassures him that he is not a Cylon "Oh, well - maybe it's because I'm a Cylon and I've never seen you at any of the meetings" and that Tyrol should return to his duties without worry.

On Caprica, Starbuck's rescue team arrives and locates the survivors including their leader Sam Anders. Their resistance force has been reduced to no more than sixty. The survivors inform their rescuers that they are being pursued by Cylons and they come under immediate attack.

=== Part 2 ===
After an 18-hour standoff on Caprica with the Cylons, Starbuck's rescue team finds that their enemy has completely withdrawn.

At the fleet, Cally is recovering from her beating by Chief Tyrol. Tyrol apologizes to Cally who forgives him and reveals that she has feelings for him. Roslin secretly meets with Baltar and asks that he table his idea for settling the planet he calls "New Caprica" until after the election. Baltar refuses, to Roslin's dismay. She then confronts him about seeing him on Caprica with the blonde Cylon woman, recalling her deathbed vision. Though visibly shaken by Laura's accusation, Baltar knows she has no proof and deflects her questioning.

When Starbuck's rescue team returns to Galactica, an alarmed Chief Tyrol notices a copy of Brother Cavil among the rescued Caprican survivors and alerts security. The man admits to being a Cylon and is taken to the brig along with Sharon Agathon, who knew Cavil was a Cylon agent and didn't warn them. Sharon later explains to Helo that she didn't warn them because she believes Adama killed her baby and that she no longer cares what happens to her.

Kara and Sam Anders get reacquainted in a bunk room. Commander Lee Adama (Apollo) enters to introduce himself to Anders, but a drunken Thrace barely acknowledges Adama's presence and makes crude remarks about his new relationship with Petty Officer Dualla.

Roslin meets with the Cylon man who is joined in the brig by his sarcastic twin, Brother Cavil. The Cylon man brings the message that two Cylon "heroes" have convinced the rest of the Cylons that the attack on the Colonies, along with the pursuit of the fleet, were errors. They state that the Cylons need to find their own unique path to enlightenment and have decided to offer humanity a "reprieve". Roslin and Adama are skeptical and Roslin orders they be vented into space.

On election day, Baltar has a 5,000 vote lead over Roslin until the final batch of votes from the Zephyr are counted. Roslin wins the election against all predictions. Lt. Gaeta, who was in charge of the ballot counting, spots a major irregularity with the Zephyr's ballot papers and reports the matter to Col. Tigh. The truth is that Tigh himself, in collusion with Dualla and Tory Foster (Roslin's campaign assistant), has rigged the election in favor of Roslin. Gaeta takes the matter directly to Admiral Adama.

Adama confronts Roslin who admits she knew that Foster was planning to rig the vote. She stresses that Baltar cannot become president because he is working for the Cylons, explaining to Adama what she saw back on Caprica. He is shocked at her claims and though he has no wish to see Baltar as president he insists the vote rigging was illegal and would eventually weigh heavily on her conscience.

Roslin reluctantly cedes the victory to Baltar. Adama explains to Baltar that the original vote count was a "tabulating error". Baltar knows this isn't true but decides to let the matter rest and orders Adama to take the fleet to New Caprica.

Baltar later meets with the Gina version of Number Six (who he previously saved, then supplied with a nuclear warhead) and tells her they can live together at the new settlement, but she says she isn't going. While Baltar is sworn in as president on Colonial One, Gina sets off the warhead. The detonation destroys Cloud Nine and several other ships caught within the blast radius. Despite the threat of a new Cylon attack, Baltar insists that plans to settle on New Caprica move forward.

The next scene opens 380 days later, when the people of the fleet have settled "New Caprica City". Above New Caprica, the remaining larger ships orbit with only skeleton crews. These include Galactica where Admiral Adama is now assisted by Helo, and Pegasus, where Commander Lee Adama is now assisted by Dualla. The battlestars are no longer being maintained in combat-ready condition.

President Baltar has turned Colonial One into a messy bachelor pad. Gaeta works diligently as his aide, though Baltar largely ignores him. Laura Roslin has returned to teaching and works inside a makeshift school assisted by Maya. Tyrol is now the leader of a disgruntled worker union denouncing the deplorable conditions the people face under President Baltar. At his side is a pregnant Cally.

Sam Anders, now married to Kara, is bedridden with pneumonia. Dr. Cottle has no more antibiotics left to give him, but Tigh tells Kara that Commander Adama has antibiotics stored away as a medical reserve on Pegasus for his pilots. Kara reluctantly calls Lee, but neither seems to wish to talk to the other. Before Lee can respond to Kara's request, a fleet of Cylon ships suddenly jumps in. Admiral Adama is reluctant to abandon those on New Caprica but Apollo, knowing that they are outmatched, convinces him to jump away, leaving New Caprica undefended.

Gaeta rushes to inform President Baltar that the Cylons have appeared and that the fleet has jumped away. The Cylons fly over New Caprica in force and proceed to occupy the human settlement. The Humanoid Cylon Leoben Conoy searches for Thrace but finds only the bedridden Anders.

President Baltar meets with the Cylons who insist they will not attack unless the humans resist. They explain that New Caprica was found by accident when they detected, from over a light-year away, the signature of the nuclear explosion which destroyed Cloud Nine. With no other option, Baltar surrenders to the Cylons on behalf of the people of New Caprica. Meanwhile, Thrace, Tigh, Roslin, Tyrol, Cally and others watch as Cylon Centurions march through the New Caprica settlement, and vow to resist.

== Notes ==
- While the episode doesn't show the deaths of the Cavils, The Plan does. While the events of the season make it appear to the audience that the Cavils and Gina's deaths will be permanent, dialogue in The Plan indicates that the Cavils did in fact resurrect. No mention is ever made of Gina amongst the Cylons again, indicating that she could be truly dead or perhaps even "boxed" by the Cylons.
- The Plan reveals that Caprica Cavil had deliberately exposed himself as a Cylon in this episode in order to halt his Galactica counterpart's plans to destroy the fleet.
- Part 1 shows the population in the fleet is 49,550. The original election results of 46,631 ballots (Roslin credited with 24,265, Baltar with 22,366) means that at least 94.1% of the fleet is of voting age. This would mean that no more than 2,919 children have survived the annihilation of the Twelve Colonies of Kobol, prior to multiple ships being destroyed in Part 2.

== Historical references ==
Chief Tyrol's speech at the Union Hall in Part II quotes directly from a speech given by activist Mario Savio at the University of California, Berkeley as part of the Free Speech Movement in 1964.
