= The Farm (Battlestar Galactica) =

- Battlestar Galactica episode
- Simon (Rick Worthy) and Starbuck (Katee Sackhoff) in the hospital on Caprica.
- Episode no.: Season 2 Episode 5
- Directed by: Rod Hardy
- Written by: Carla Robinson
- Original air date: August 12, 2005

Guest appearances
- Michael Trucco as Sam Anders; Rick Worthy as Simon; Lorena Gale as Priestess Elosha; Richard Hatch as Tom Zarek; Tamara Lashley as Sue-Shaun

Episode chronology
← Previous "Resistance"	Next → "Home"
- Battlestar Galactica season 2

"The Farm" is the fifth episode of the second season of the reimagined Battlestar Galactica television series. It aired originally on the Sci Fi Channel on August 12, 2005. It is the first episode of the series in which the plot is set on Caprica.

In the episode, Cylons capture Kara "Starbuck" Thrace and hold her in an abandoned hospital, where they are performing experiments with human reproduction. Starbuck escapes and leaves Caprica to return to the human fleet. Commander William Adama returns to command of the fleet, but President Laura Roslin persuades almost a third of the fleet to follow her back to Kobol.

According to executive producer Ronald D. Moore, the production process for "The Farm" was one of the most contentious of the second season.

Starbuck's portrayal in "The Farm" has attracted academic study. Critical reaction was mixed.

== Plot ==
=== Caprica ===
Starbuck wakes up with Sam Anders. He tries to persuade her to stay on Caprica, but she insists on returning to Galactica. She recommends the resistance give up fighting, move to higher ground, and wait for her to return with a rescue party.

Cylons ambush the resistance as they make plans to capture a Cylon Heavy Raider. Starbuck is shot and loses consciousness. She wakes in a hospital, where a doctor named Simon tends her. Simon explains that Anders brought her to the hospital but later died from a shrapnel wound. Simon laughingly dismisses Starbuck's suspicion that he is a Cylon and explains away her other concerns. He presses the idea that Starbuck have a baby, calling child-bearing women "a very precious commodity to us." Starbuck demurs.

Meanwhile, Anders, very much alive, leads a search party. Caprica-Boomer appears and promises to take them to Starbuck.

Starbuck is kept heavily sedated. She is suspicious after an unplanned emergency surgery following a pelvic examination, and her suspicions are confirmed when Simon calls her "Starbuck", a name she never revealed to him. Starbuck fakes sedation and sneaks out of her room, where she sees Simon talking to a Number Six copy. When Simon returns, Starbuck kills him by stabbing him with a fragment from a broken mirror. Searching for a way out, she discovers other captured human women, attached to machines. One woman Starbuck recognizes, a member of the resistance named Sue-Shaun, says they have become "baby machines" and "can't live like this." Starbuck breaks the Cylon equipment, killing the women. Fleeing, she encounters another copy of Simon, confirming that he is a Cylon. The resistance rescues Starbuck with the aid of Boomer, who provides close air support from a Heavy Raider.

Boomer explains that the Cylons have had no success reproducing on their own and are trying to reproduce with humans. Appalled, Starbuck volunteers to stay and help liberate these so-called "Farms". Anders reminds her of her mission, and she reiterates her promise to return with rescue, giving him her dog tags. He promises to liberate as many of the "Farms" as possible. She departs in the stolen Heavy Raider with Boomer and Helo to return to the human fleet.

=== The human fleet ===
Commander Adama returns to command and orders a ship-by-ship search for Roslin and Lee "Apollo" Adama, who are still on the run. After Apollo finds himself unable to go through with Tom Zarek's suggestion that he denounce his father publicly, Roslin sends a message to the fleet asking anyone who believes in the prophecies to follow her to Kobol. Commander Adama dismisses the message as "religious crap" and is astonished when almost a third of the fleet follows her.

Chief Galen Tyrol says Galactica-Boomer was just a machine, but Commander Adama insists she was more than that. Nonetheless Adama explains to Tyrol that Specialist Cally will spend 30 days in the brig for unlawful discharge of a firearm (so not explicitly for murder). He also reminds Tyrol that the human-looking Cylons are made in many copies, so Tyrol will see Boomer again eventually, although that sounds more like a menace than a promise. Adama views Boomer's corpse in the morgue and weeps over her.

=== Deleted scenes ===
In a deleted scene, Apollo explains his refusal to denounce his father by telling Roslin that he was disappointed that she did not back him up when he mutinied to protect her in "Kobol's Last Gleaming". In his view, he has defied his father enough, and the struggle now belongs to Roslin. In another deleted scene, he promises to stick with Roslin regardless of the consequences of their imminent departure from the fleet.

== Characterization ==
In his podcast commentary on "The Farm", Moore discusses his views of what the episode's events reveal about several of the characters.

- Following Adama's brush with death, he returns to command with his "emotions... closer to the surface." This marks a change in his character that the writers intended to affect Adama for the rest of the second season. The change is manifest in this episode in his speech returning to the CIC and his angry reaction to Roslin's message. Roslin notices the change and Adama acknowledges it in a scene deleted from "Home, Part 2".
- When Adama asks Tyrol questions about his feelings for Boomer, he is also asking them of himself, internally. His conflict over her comes to a head when he views her body. Executive producer David Eick said in a later podcast that actor Edward James Olmos (Adama) told him following shooting the morgue scene that he expected Adama would try to kill Boomer if he ever saw her again.
- Starbuck's relationship with Anders is consistent with her character: she "sleeps [with] who she feels like sleeping with and makes no apologies for it." However, her emotional reaction to Simon telling her of Anders's death proves that she does have genuine feelings for him.
- At the start of the episode, Anders wants Starbuck to stay, but Starbuck remains focused on her mission. By the end, Starbuck's fury over her violation has changed her mind, but Anders reminds her that she has to leave.
- Roslin chooses to "play the religion card" and is surprised at the effects: people of faith in the fleet start treating her differently, with reverence. Moore says she will later come to regret her choice.

Amanda Keith of Los Angeles Newspaper Group attributes to Adama "a serious case of PTSD and a lot of misdirected rage." Susan Tankersley of Television Without Pity writes of Adama reminding Tyrol that Boomer would return, "it's not clear if Adama is trying to warn Tyrol, or comfort him. Probably a bit of both."

== Analysis ==
"I am not a commodity. I am a Viper pilot."

— Starbuck

Scholars have considered how "The Farm" approaches reproduction sociologically. Ingvil Hellstrand argues that the episode "raises issues of reproduction as a gendered imperative, where fertile women have a moral obligation or duty to reproduce." In this context, she identifies Starbuck with the desire for individual agency and Simon with "state-regulated biopolitics". In this regard, Starbuck is "both anti-natalist and techno-critical". The conflict between freedom and control is not presented in the series as strictly between human and Cylon; Roslin outlaws abortion in the human fleet twelve episodes later, in "The Captain's Hand". Lorna Jowett argues that the Farm exists within a context of "masculinized science" in which a man (Simon) controls reproduction and the women are viewed as baby-making machines. Susan A. George argues that the Cylons are seeking to absorb the captive human women into a kind of biological machine.

Scholars have also identified real-world contemporary issues around reproduction discussed in "The Farm". In Jowett's view the Cylon "desperation to reproduce" reflects contemporary human anxieties. Hellstrand connects Starbuck's presentation as a career-focused white woman choosing to remain childless with contemporary demographics in Europe and the United States. In this context, Simon's appeals to Starbuck correspond to attempts by governments in these areas to increase fertility rates. Hellstrand also notes that Starbuck's character is modeled on her male counterpart in the original Battlestar Galactica, but only the female Starbuck is forced to explain her career-oriented lifestyle choices.

Jowett notes that the "image of women hooked up to machines for reproduction" can be found in other works of science fiction, citing the television series Dark Angel and the film Alien Resurrection. Kieran Tranter cites the Dune franchise as an additional precedent. Hellstrand compares Starbuck's destruction of the Cylon facility to Ellen Ripley's destruction of clones of herself in Alien Resurrection, saying that both characters "feel violated by an authority pushing for scientific advancements linked to their reproductive ability." In Hellstrand's analysis, like Ripley, Starbuck destroys versions of herself that represent an unacceptable transgression against her reproductive rights. Hellstrand compares Starbuck's violent action with Athena's decision in the third-season episode "Rapture" to die so she can be resurrected and rescue her child from the other Cylons.

Patrick B. Sharp examines "The Farm"'s presentation of Starbuck as a female soldier. In particular, he contrasts Starbuck, who seeks to be an excellent soldier and uses violence to accomplish her objectives, with female soldiers in other works of fiction, such as G.I. Jane, which he says present violence as incidental to their jobs rather than essential to their characters. Euthanizing the captive women demonstrates how seriously Starbuck and the other female resistance fighters take their roles as soldiers: they "would rather die than be forced to become mothers." Sharp also compares Starbuck's ordeal of being captured during war and treated in a strange hospital to Jessica Lynch's experience during Operation Iraqi Freedom.

Keith argues that the episode inspires a measure of sympathy for the Cylons. In her view, their inability to reproduce is lamentable by itself, but it is made sadder by the fact that it precludes them from following their God's commandments.

Moore notes a reversal of gender roles in Starbuck's promise to return for Anders. In his view it is more traditional in stories for a man to promise to rescue a woman.

== Production ==
"The Farm" was controversial among the production team, some of whom feared that the episode was too dark and would drive away female viewers. This was considered especially important because of female viewers' historical reluctance to embrace science fiction. According to Moore, among the episodes of the second season, only "Valley of Darkness" may have had as contentious a production process. The decision to suggest that Simon had given Starbuck a pelvic exam was particularly controversial.

The outline of the episode remained largely the same from its conception. The largest change was for Starbuck to be unsure at first whether she is in a Cylon facility. According to Moore, the writers never believed they could fool the audience entirely into thinking Simon was human; rather, they sought to introduce ambiguity and then resolve it.

The first scene with Roslin and Apollo shows them hiding in cold storage aboard a civilian ship. Moore originally conceived for them to hide in a meat locker among "the last brisquets, burgers, filets, and pot roasts left in the universe" as a reminder of the magnitude of humanity's loss. When every meat locker art director Doug McLean scouted in Vancouver, where Battlestar Galactica was filmed, proved too small or too cold to film in, production designer Richard Hudolin built the cold storage room on a set with a window that would suggest a meat locker in the next room.

The scene in which the resistance encounters Sharon was written as a night scene but was filmed during the day for production reasons. Also, a scene showing the bloody aftermath of Caprica-Sharon's capture of the Heavy Raider was cut due to time constraints. The shots of the resistance boarding the Heavy Raider were all done with a green screen and a corresponding green ramp.

When Starbuck is shot, a wound on her eyebrow switches from the right to the left side of her face in an apparent mistake. In fact, the shot in which the switch occurs is a mirror image, as evidenced from the position of the steering wheel in the truck behind her. According to Moore, this was not a mistake but a deliberate editing choice to reflect the psychological trauma Starbuck undergoes.

Starbuck leaves one of her dog tags behind with Anders at the end of the episode. Actress Katee Sackhoff (Starbuck) came up with this as a way for the character to demonstrate her commitment to return to Anders.

== Reception ==
Critical reaction to "The Farm" was mixed. Jason Davis of Mania gave the episode an A+, praising the writing's "elegance and economy" and writing that Sackhoff "never ceases to astonish with the naturalness of her performance." Simon Brew of Den of Geek also commended Sackhoff's acting and added that "The Farm" "was as good an episode as I've seen thus far of Battlestar Galactica." Writing retrospectively several months after the episode aired, Jacob Clifton of Television Without Pity also praised Sackhoff's acting and compared the episode as a whole favorably to the episodes "Litmus", "Final Cut", and "Scar"; he gave the last of these an A−. Tankersley gave "The Farm" a B− and wrote of the pelvic exam, "Gack. This scene's kind of short on things I feel comfortable making jokes about, honestly." Keith called actor Rick Worthy (Simon) "criminally underused" and wrote, "First time through, I didn't think of a lot of this episode, but in hindsight, it packs a lot of character moments into what is essentially an action episode."

== Connections to other series elements ==
- The Cylons' inability to reproduce biologically, revealed in "The Farm", is the reason for their cultivation of the relationship between Helo and Caprica-Boomer in the first season.
- In "The Farm", Caprica-Boomer reiterates the contention Leoben Conoy made in "Flesh and Bone" that Starbuck has a special destiny.
- Eick used Olmos's prediction of Adama's reaction to seeing Boomer again to help craft Adama's encounter with Caprica-Boomer in "Home, Part 2".
- Starbuck returns to Caprica and rescues Anders and the resistance, as promised, in the second-season finale, "Lay Down Your Burdens".
