= Black Market (Battlestar Galactica) =

- Battlestar Galactica episode
- Episode no.: Season 2 Episode 14
- Directed by: James Head
- Written by: Mark Verheiden
- Original air date: January 27, 2006

Guest appearances
- Richard Hatch as Tom Zarek; Graham Beckel as Commander Jack Fisk; Claudette Mink as Shevon; Donnelly Rhodes as Doctor Cottle; Bill Duke as Phelan; Leah Cairns as Racetrack; Hayley Guiel as Paya

Episode chronology
← Previous "Epiphanies"	Next → "Scar"
- Battlestar Galactica season 2

"Black Market" is the fourteenth episode of the second season of the reimagined Battlestar Galactica television series. It aired originally on the Sci Fi Channel on January 27, 2006. In the episode, Apollo's investigation of the fleet's black market becomes intertwined with his involvement with a prostitute. The episode was a disappointment both to executive producer Ronald D. Moore and to critics, several of whom called it the series's worst episode.

== Plot ==
Haunted by his near-death experience after ejecting from the Blackbird, Apollo begins sleeping with Shevon, a prostitute on Cloud Nine who reminds him of his pregnant girlfriend who died in the Cylon attack on the Twelve Colonies. Dee asks Apollo whether their relationship is going anywhere; he brushes her off.

President Laura Roslin decides to crack down on the black market within the fleet. Commander Jack Fisk at first advises against it but then volunteers Pegasus to take the lead. Fisk is later found garrotted in his quarters. Assigned to investigate the murder, Apollo discovers Fisk was heavily involved in the black market, and that Vice President Gaius Baltar and Colonel Saul Tigh were among Fisk's trading partners. Roslin privately asks Baltar to resign; the suggestion insults Baltar and redoubles his determination to stay in office.

Responding to an emergency call from Shevon, Apollo rushes to Cloud Nine to find her bruised and distressed. Thugs enter Shevon's room and attack Apollo. As he is being strangled, a gangster tells Apollo to stop investigating Fisk's murder, threatens Shevon and her daughter Paya if he refuses, and knocks Apollo out. Apollo wakes to find Shevon and Paya gone and the wielder of the garrote murdered.

Tom Zarek enters the room soon after. He claims he refused to join Fisk's smuggling network and suggests that the murderer's corpse was given to Apollo as "a way out" of his investigation. Apollo is not dissuaded, so Zarek mentions a man named Phelan who runs the black market and gives Apollo the location of his ship. On Phelan's ship, Apollo discovers the black market is hoarding antibiotics and trafficking in children; Paya is among their prisoners. Phelan, who turns out to be the gangster from before, reveals that Shevon works for him and defends the black market as necessary. Apollo offers Phelan amnesty if he will release Shevon and Paya and shut down his operation. When Phelan refuses, Apollo wrests a bodyguard's handgun and kills Phelan. Apollo acknowledges that the fleet needs the black market and so doesn't shut it down. However, he warns the smugglers to remove the human smuggling, hoarding and murder parts of their operation or he will shut them down.

Roslin objects but acquiesces to the resolution. Zarek makes his way aboard Phelan's ship surrounded by his men, indicating that Zarek will take over the black market. Shevon refuses to see Apollo again, saying she cannot replace his lost love. Dee returns to Billy Keikeya.

== Production ==
Apollo's journey through the fleet's criminal underground culminating with the encounter with Phelan was inspired by Heart of Darkness. The writers were initially excited by the combination of this storytelling device with the opportunity to complicate Apollo's character. Moore was happy with the script when it was written but gradually came to believe the episode was deeply flawed. In October 2005 he wrote, in reference to the still unaired "Black Market", that he was "positively angry with myself at something I knew in my bones had fallen well below the bar I set for myself and for the show in general." In particular, he felt that the episode was too conventional in its story and execution. Moore attributed what he considered a drop in quality from other episodes to the second season's increased production schedule; nonetheless, he insisted that the responsibility belonged with him rather than with the circumstances or with anyone else who worked on the episode.

Moore was particularly disappointed with how the black market's illegality is established. At first, Moore notes, it is difficult to see what distinction Roslin makes between legitimate and illicit commerce in a post-apocalyptic environment. The distinction may only become clear to the audience once the child trafficking is revealed, but Moore came to regard this as a "cheap" dodge of the dilemma.

== Reception ==
Critics mostly shared Moore's disappointment with "Black Market". Rose Wojnar of The San Diego Union-Tribune gave the episode a D+, calling it "one of the weakest, if not the weakest, episode of an otherwise outstanding series so far." Jacob Clifton of Television Without Pity gave it a D, writing, "Good acting is marred by nonsensical plot and unreadable dialogue." Clifton later elaborated that the episode "sucked hard". Keith McDuffee of TV Squad considered the episode unrealistic and unnecessary. Amanda Keith of the Los Angeles Newspaper Group wrote, "'Black Market, one of the most reviled episodes of the entire series, deserves it." Simon Brew of Den of Geek wrote, "this probably the weakest episode of the show [so far] ... [but] it still manages to blast pretty much every other show off the screen." Jason Davis of Mania gave "Black Market" an A−, praising the development of Apollo's character and Bill Duke's performance but criticizing the plot; nonetheless, Davis called it "better than most of the programming on TV."

In September 2007, Adam Swiderski of UGO called "Black Market" the series's worst episode, calling it "one big, confused mess that has nothing to do with anything". StephenFlagg (Dean Spence) of ScrewAttack also called it the series's worst episode, but said, "Bad? Yes. Boring? Yes. Terrible? No." Alan Sepinwall praised Duke's performance but called "Black Market" "one of the series' low points".
