= DJ Flipout =

Canadian disc jockey, radio personality, and actor

- Born: Philip Cabrita; October 10, 1974 (age 51); Vancouver, British Columbia, Canada
- Origin: Vancouver, British Columbia, Canada
- Genres: Hip hop
- Occupations: Disc jockey; radio personality; actor
- Years active: early 1990s–present

DJ Flipout (born Philip Cabrita; October 10, 1974) is a Canadian disc jockey, radio personality, and background actor based in Vancouver, British Columbia. He has hosted The 5 O'Clock Traffic Jam on the Vancouver radio station 94.5 Virgin Radio since the mid-2000s, and has served as host of the Red Bull Thre3style World DJ Championships, an international DJ competition that originated in Vancouver in 2007. He has also appeared in numerous background and minor supporting screen roles, including the Battlestar Galactica spin-off series Caprica.

== Early life ==
Cabrita was born on October 10, 1974, in Vancouver, British Columbia. He grew up in Burnaby where, while attending Burnaby Central High School, began rapping and adopted the stage name "Flipout" around that time. He went on to perform in his own rap group, Anger Management Project, before moving into club and radio work as a disc jockey. Outside of his predilection for music, served as an altar boy at St. Theresa's Catholic Church, having grown up across the street from that organization during his youth.

== Career ==
=== Radio ===
Cabrita and fellow disc jockey Jay Swing hosted a Saturday-night hip-hop program, "The Show" with Checkmate, on the University of British Columbia's campus station CiTR. In May 1995 the pair launched Elements, a self-published hip-hop magazine produced out of the station; working largely without outside contributors, with graffiti artists from the AA Crew supplying illustrations, they put out eight issues before the title folded the following year amid recurring missed deadlines. Cabrita also took part in Vancouver's breakdancing scene where, in 1997, he toured as a B-boy with the Canadian hip-hop group Rascalz alongside American rapper KRS-One.

From 1998 to 2006, Cabrita and Swing co-hosted Straight Goods, a hip-hop radio mixshow in Vancouver, where Cabrita interviewed touring hip-hop artists, including Afrika Bambaataa, and was made an honorary member of the Universal Zulu Nation as a result. The Vancouver Sun reported in 2010 that Cabrita had been DJing professionally in the city for nearly two decades by that point.

By January 2010, Cabrita was co-hosting a daily in-studio mixshow, The 5 O'Clock Traffic Jam, on Vancouver's commercial hit-music station The Beat 94.5 (later rebranded as 94.5 Virgin Radio) with Holly Conway.

Cabrita was among the competitors at the first Red Bull 3Style event, a one-off DJ contest staged at Vancouver's Atlantis nightclub in 2007 that subsequently grew into the international Red Bull Thre3style World DJ Championships. He hosted the competition's Vancouver heat in 2009, competed himself the following year, and went on to serve as official host of the Thre3style World Finals in Vancouver, Toronto, Baku, and Tokyo. Cabrita has also continued to perform at public events around Vancouver, including the city's Concord New Year's Eve celebration in 2017 and Surrey's annual Tree Lighting Festival in 2024. In June 2010, Cabrita took part in a five-hour outdoor tribute to Michael Jackson in downtown Vancouver marking the one-year anniversary of the singer's death, one of about ten local DJs to perform at the event.

=== Acting ===
Cabrita has appeared in numerous background and minor supporting screen roles, primarily in productions filmed in Vancouver. His credits include the horror film Case 39 (2009), the science-fiction series Fringe (2009) and The X-Files (2018), and the Netflix series Altered Carbon (2018). In 2010, he portrayed a suicide bomber at Caprica's Atlas Arena during the climax of "Apotheosis," the series finale of the Battlestar Galactica spin-off Caprica, which introduced and later galvanized the efficacy of the Cylons to the Twelve Colonies of Kobol.
