= Sacrifice (Battlestar Galactica) =

- Battlestar Galactica episode
- Episode no.: Season 2 Episode 16
- Directed by: Rey Villalobos
- Written by: Anne Cofell Saunders
- Original air date: February 10, 2006

Guest appearances
- Kate Vernon as Ellen Tigh; Dana Delany as Sesha Abinell

Episode chronology
← Previous "Scar"	Next → "The Captain's Hand"
- Battlestar Galactica season 2

"Sacrifice" is the sixteenth episode of the second season of the reimagined Battlestar Galactica television series. It aired originally on the Sci Fi Channel on February 10, 2006.

In the episode, Dee spurns Billy Keikeya and goes on a date with Lee "Apollo" Adama at a bar. An armed group takes control of the bar, demanding the captive Cylon Sharon in return for the lives of their hostages. Lee is badly wounded when Starbuck attempts a rescue. Billy is shot and killed saving Dee just before a team of Marines raids the bar and rescues the remaining hostages.

The episode focuses on Admiral William Adama's relationship with Sharon as he weighs the gunmen's demands. It also presents the gunmen's motives and raises questions about whether there is merit to their point of view.

According to executive producer Ronald D. Moore, Billy was killed to release actor Paul Campbell to do other projects. Campbell said in an interview that it was because he was unwilling to sign a five-year contract for the series. In early drafts of the episode, Colonel Saul Tigh clashed with Adama over his handling of the crisis, but in the final version episode the two of them and President Laura Roslin all agree that they cannot bow to the demands of a group they call terrorists.

Critical reaction to "Sacrifice" was lukewarm. Moore discussed his own disappointment with several aspects of the episode in his podcast commentary on the episode.

== Plot ==
The press has learned that a Number Eight model Cylon is being held in Galactica's brig. Admiral Adama insists to President Laura Roslin that Sharon is a valuable source of intelligence. Billy, Roslin's chief of staff, urges Adama to tell the fleet about Sharon.

Billy proposes marriage to Dee, but Dee turns him down. Later he discovers Dee on a date with Lee in a bar on Cloud 9 and is heartbroken.

Gunmen led by Sesha Abinell take over the bar, demanding that the Admiral hand over Sharon. Learning that Abinell is seeking revenge for her husband's death in a Cylon attack, Adama refuses and orders Starbuck to plan a rescue with several marines. A ruse by Lee convinces the gunmen that the bar is losing oxygen, giving Starbuck an opening. Her attempt backfires, and she accidentally shoots Lee during the confusion. Dee and Billy attend the bleeding, unconscious Lee. Roslin argues to Admiral Adama and Colonel Tigh they cannot give in to terrorists. As Abinell threatens Ellen Tigh, who is among the hostages, Adama agrees to hand over Sharon, but not alive.

Adama sends over the corpse of Sharon "Boomer" Valerii, the Number Eight copy who shot him and died, to give Marines time to storm the bar. Abinell shoots Boomer's corpse but discovers the deception shortly after. She orders Dee killed. Against Dee's advice, Billy grabs a gun and shoots the would-be executioner dead. As he dies, the executioner also shoots and kills Billy. The Marines kill the remaining gunmen, including Abinell, and free the hostages.

Roslin mourns Billy, whom she described as "the closest thing I have to family left". Dee awaits Lee's recovery in Galactica's sickbay as Starbuck looks on.

== Analysis ==
Moore says in his podcast commentary on "Sacrifice" that the episode "is all about Sharon in some measure, because even though she's off-camera for most of it, all the events are driven by her presence and what she's about." He notes that Sharon's motives and whether the humans can trust her are open questions. Moore says that Admiral Adama feels an emotional connection to Sharon despite her being a Cylon and despite having been nearly killed by another Number Eight copy. He contrasts this with Colonel Tigh, who is more skeptical. At several points in the episode, Tigh reminds Adama that Sharon is a machine, a "thing". Amanda Keith of the Los Angeles Newspaper Group writes that Adama's trust of Sharon places him apart from other characters in this episode and that Billy's life is the price of that trust.

Moore notes that Abinell has a fundamentally different perspective on the events of the series than the audience. The audience sees the fleet's leadership in action and understands why Adama and Roslin make the decisions they do. By contrast, Abinell's perspective is shaped by what she hears from the press and other characters. Moore said one aim of the episode was to raise the question of whether the audience could understand her point of view and should sympathize with her. He also notes that, in at least one respect, Abinell is right where Adama and Roslin are wrong: she believes correctly that the defense ministry of the Twelve Colonies was infiltrated by Cylons before the Destruction of the Twelve Colonies. Abinell is also correct that Sharon is not being as helpful as she could be, she refuses to turn informer against other Cylon agents in the fleet. Jacob Clifton of Television Without Pity argues that "all of her info is pretty much on target" and says her group and the Cylon sympathizer group Demand Peace "are right about everything". In his judgment she is wrong to take her grief out on the people in the bar, because everyone in the fleet has lost loved ones for no good reason. He also argues that Abinell's initial resistance to Adama's offer to bring Sharon dead and her violent reaction upon seeing the corpse prove that her motivations are personal rather than political. This accords with what he sees as one of the series's themes: that political questions and conflicts generally boil down to personal ones.

Clifton connects Starbuck's botched rescue in "Sacrifice" with her failures in the previous episode, "Scar". He sees them as part of a disintegration of the professional competence that helps Starbuck endure her broken personal life. He compares the process of stripping Starbuck of her protection to Eustace Scrubb losing his dragon skin in The Voyage of the Dawn Treader.

== Production ==
Moore said that Billy was killed in "Sacrifice" because Campbell was being offered good roles on other television series, and the scheduling conflicts were interfering with filming. The writers found it implausible that Billy would simply quit as Roslin's chief of staff and could not think of any other good excuses for the character to be missing from the narrative for long stretches, so they decided to kill the character. Moore called Campbell's departure sad and said in his podcast commentary, "It's not something I thought we'd be doing when the season began." Campbell said in an interview that he was not surprised by the decision. He said that he was unwilling to sign a five-year contract, and the producers concluded he was not committed to the series.

Moore said the plot was influenced by the film Dog Day Afternoon. In the film, as in "Sacrifice", a "true believer" stands at the top of the hostage takers, who are ultimately unprepared for the arrival of the authorities.

Early drafts of the episode focused on a conflict between Admiral Adama and Colonel Tigh over the hostage situation. In these early versions, Tigh pressed Adama to give the hostage-takers what they asked for to protect Ellen. The confrontation was even supposed to turn violent. Eventually the writers decided that Tigh would not want to give in to the demands of people he considered terrorists, and the conflict was removed from the script. Moore notes that Adama and Roslin also have loved ones in the bar (Lee and Billy, respectively), but the emotional connection does not affect their decisions, either.

In a scene that was cut because of time and financial constraints, Starbuck's presence aboard Cloud 9 was explained by showing her about to have a liaison with a man she had just met. This was intended as a counterpoint to Lee pursuing a relationship with Dee rather than Starbuck and as further demonstration of Starbuck's self-destruction over her feelings about Sam Anders. Moore noted that showing this in "Sacrifice" would have contradicted the previous episode, "Scar", in which Starbuck finds a measure of peace over Anders.

Executive producer David Eick knew actress Dana Delany (Abinell) personally and convinced her to make a guest appearance in the series. He first approached her about it during the first season.

The bar scenes were filmed on a film set rather than in an existing location. The writers considered having the hostage situation occur aboard a shuttle. They moved it to a bar because they did not have a shuttle set available, and building the bar was less complicated and less expensive. The shots of the Marines preparing for the final assault were taken from the first-season episode "Bastille Day".

== Reception ==
"Sacrifice" received a lukewarm response from critics. Rose Wojnar of The San Diego Union-Tribune gave the episode a B−, criticizing "overuse of Sesha’s flashback of her husband dying and the predictable shot of her falling dead on Sharon’s body". Clifton gave "Sacrifice" a B+, praising Delany's performance but criticizing the lack of context for Lee and Dee's relationship. Overall, he called it "the best episode in a while". Keith McDuffee of TV Squad was glad to see Lee back to form after several difficult episodes but questioned the plausibility of the terrorists falling for the Boomer-switching trick. Amanda Keith responded favorably to the episode in general but felt the writers "flubbed how they portrayed [Dee's] relationship with Lee". Simon Brew of Den of Geek wrote, "it was good telly, but the show has inevitably struggled to recapture the flat-out brilliance of the middle of the season."

Moore felt the episode fell short in several respects. He felt that the episode did not spend enough time with Abinell, getting the audience to understand how the loss of her husband radicalized her after the loss of the Colonies did not; he said Delany's strong performance made up for some of this. He hoped there would be more tension surrounding how Admiral Adama, Roslin, and Colonel Tigh each had a loved one in the bar. He also disliked how Starbuck's raid was filmed and thought that the script fell short by not explaining why the Marines don't storm the bar from the back through the passage where Lee tampers with the oxygen sensor. Moore emphasized that he believed the episode's shortcomings were his responsibility as showrunner and that his criticisms were directed at himself and not at anyone else. He praised the performances of actors Jamie Bamber (Lee), Paul Campbell (Billy), Kandyse McClure (Dee), Mary McDonnell (Roslin), and Katee Sackhoff (Starbuck). Overall, he called it "a decent episode, not my favorite but I don't think a disaster."
