= Scar (Battlestar Galactica) =

- Battlestar Galactica episode
- The Cylon Raider, nicknamed Scar
- Episode no.: Season 2 Episode 15
- Directed by: Michael Nankin
- Written by: David Weddle; Bradley Thompson
- Original air date: February 3, 2006

Guest appearances
- Luciana Carro as Louanne "Kat" Katraine; Bodie Olmos as Hot Dog; Christopher Jacot as Ensign Brent "BB" Baxton; Sean Dorry as Ensign Joseph "Jo-Jo" Clark; Christian Tessier as Tucker "Duck" Clellan

Episode chronology
← Previous "Black Market"	Next → "Sacrifice"
- Battlestar Galactica season 2

"Scar" is the fifteenth episode of the second season of the reimagined Battlestar Galactica television series. It aired originally on the Sci Fi Channel on February 3, 2006.

In the episode, Viper pilots Starbuck and Kat form a rivalry over which of them will destroy Scar, a feared Cylon Raider. Tormented by her feelings for Sam Anders, Starbuck nearly allows Scar to kill her in a game of chicken. In the end, she swerves and lures Scar to Kat, who destroys Scar.

Executive producer Ronald D. Moore insisted that the episode include only one dogfight. As a result, the episode focuses on the differences between Starbuck and Kat and how their personalities come into conflict rather than on space combat. Their mutual animosity has been identified as an inversion of typical gender roles, especially in comparison with the male pilot Apollo. According to one analysis, Scar represents more than just a professional rivalry, but both characters' personal demons.

Critical reception to "Scar" was mostly positive. The episode appeared on several retrospective "best of" lists.

== Plot ==
Drunk in the pilots' mess, Starbuck vows to destroy Scar, a Raider known as the Cylons' ace of aces and dreaded for his sneak attacks. Kat challenges Starbuck, getting her to bet her beer stein labeled "Galactica Top Gun". Later, Kat interrupts Starbuck during a briefing, breaks her record in a test of shooting a side arm accurately while dizzy, and chastises her after her advice gets a rookie pilot killed by Scar.

Sharon warns Starbuck that Scar is likely so competent and bloodthirsty because "he" has died and been resurrected many times. With the Cylon Resurrection ship gone, destroying him would make his death permanent.

Starbuck is troubled by memories of Anders, whom she promised to rescue from Caprica; Admiral William Adama and President Laura Roslin have refused to order a rescue mission. After the rookie's death, she drunkenly comes on to Apollo but rejects him during foreplay. They fight over her feelings for Anders. She leaves and continues drinking while watching archival gun camera footage of Scar.

Later, Starbuck is hung over and assigns another pilot to take her place on patrol. When Scar kills her inexperienced wingman, Kat blames Starbuck. They trade insults. Starbuck taunts Kat for her fear of Scar, and Kat punches Starbuck. Apollo arrives, cutting the altercation short. He orders the two pilots to fly together to protect a mining operation in an asteroid field.

As Starbuck and Kat patrol in their Vipers, Kat pursues a Raider she believes to be Scar. As Starbuck checks behind them, the real Scar appears and damages Starbuck's Viper. Starbuck plays chicken with Scar, to Kat's horror. Remembering her promise to Anders, Starbuck swerves at the last moment. She lures Scar into Kat's line of fire, and Kat shoots him down. Back in the mess, Starbuck yields her stein to Kat and toasts a succession of pilots who have perished since the war began. She claimed previously that she could not remember their names.

Later, while practicing boxing with Helo, she admits that, before she met Anders, she would have not thought twice about dying in the process of killing Scar, while Helo tells her that letting Kat take the shot was the right decision. She tells Helo that she can't get over the hope that Anders might still be alive, despite the unlikelihood. Helo suggests that before meeting Anders, Starbuck had something to die for, but now she has something to live for.

== Characterization ==
Moore notes that, despite Starbuck's reputation as a superior fighter pilot, "Scar" demonstrates a number of her character flaws and poor choices. He cites her obsessive competition with Kat, her drinking, and her ill conceived attempt to sleep with Apollo. Writers David Weddle and Bradley Thompson based Starbuck's portrayal in "Scar" in part on their fathers, whom Weddle described as "war veterans who were very conflicted and self-destructive". Jacob Clifton of Television Without Pity sees the episode in part as a deconstruction of the myth of Starbuck as a perfect pilot, a myth embraced by the characters, particularly Kat, and the audience alike. Kieran Tranter echoes this analysis, noting that her competence as a pilot was unquestioned in the series before "Scar".

Thompson contrasts Starbuck's attitude toward the new pilots with Kat's. Where Starbuck has become jaded by seeing so many rookies killed in battle, Kat reaches out to them with advice and genuine concern. Moore contrasts Apollo's calm in "Scar" with Starbuck and Kat's mutual animosity and suggests that this amounts to a reversal of gender roles. Clifton also notes that the episode plays a "Flip the Genders game." Moore observes that Starbuck opens up to Helo in "Scar" more than she opens up to Apollo; the series established previously that she and Helo are old friends. Clifton contends that Helo, as a pilot of Raptors rather than Vipers, does not fully understand Starbuck's loss, but he makes up for it by being instinctively supportive.

Clifton sees Starbuck's anguish over leaving Anders as a manifestation of a recurring tension in the series between the impulses to "'Stay and fight' or 'Run and rebuild'" when fighting would mean certain death. Anders represents what Starbuck could have had if the Cylons had not destroyed the Twelve Colonies. His absence also allows Starbuck to project away her feelings instead of confronting them. Clifton notes further that Starbuck's status as an adult survivor of child abuse complicates her feelings on these issues.

Clifton reflects on what Scar represents to Starbuck and Kat. Overall, he writes, "the real truth is not that nailing Scar is a competition for them; the real truth is that Scar has become each other, and everything that takes things away from them." For both of them, this goes beyond fear of the Cylons in general. For Starbuck, Scar embodies her anxiety over the mysterious operation the Cylons performed on her on Caprica and the abuse in her past; Clifton notes both these experiences left literal scars on Starbuck. For Kat, Scar embodies her fear of not being as good as Starbuck and her fear of letting the fleet down, which in the past caused her to turn to abuse stimulants.

Kat and some other pilots try to remember the name of a fallen comrade's girlfriend who died in the attack on the Colonies, but Starbuck considers it pointless. Clifton suggests Kat identifies with the dead woman more than Starbuck because Kat was a civilian until she signed up as a pilot during the series. He also notes a similarity between the names that are guessed (Kathy, Katherine, Kassie, Karen), Kat's call sign, and Starbuck's first name, Kara.

== Production ==
Moore wanted an episode focused on Viper pilots like the first-season episode "Act of Contrition". In particular, he wanted to explore their daily lives aboard Galactica and their tactics in battle. Writers David Weddle and Bradley Thompson kept the episode from becoming too "industrial" by incorporating executive producer David Eick's desire for a confrontation between Starbuck and Kat. Weddle compared "Scar" to the film Battleground for its focus on the individual pilots.

Moore restricted the writers to one dogfight in this episode. To increase the dramatic tension, Weddle and Thompson began the episode at the start of Starbuck and Kat's patrol and told the bulk of the story in flashbacks; inserted more opportunities for Starbuck and Kat to clash on Galactica; and wrote another dogfight to be narrated over radio.

The writers went over the script in detail with Moore in a July 2005 writers' meeting that was recorded and published by podcast. One key plot point they discussed at length was a motive for Galactica staying in one place while Scar shoots down its fighters one at a time. Slate summarized the ensuing discussion:

One writer suggests that they're fixing the engines (a true standby of science fiction, one that served Star Trek for decades). Another writer proposes that ...Vipers are vulnerable because they're flying attenuated, long-distance patrols. Moore eventually decides that the fleet must have manufacturing facilities, but needs raw material, some magic metal for building Vipers found only where the ship is stuck. 'Then it can influence the conversations in the ready room,' Moore says, 'because of the psychological toll on the pilots. Now their machines are more valuable than they are.'

A scene of auctioning off a recently killed rookie pilot's belongings was written and filmed, but it was cut from the episode. Moore felt it was too jarring a scene to include in the episode. He compared the practice of new pilots taking dead pilots' bunks to a scene from Full Metal Jacket.

The chair in which the pilots spin to get dizzy before their accuracy test was based on a similar device Moore saw at Edwards Air Force Base; the test there was to point one's finger accurately rather than to fire a weapon. Thompson based Scar's technique of flying at Starbuck with the sun behind him obscure her vision on a technique described in World War II pilot Pappy Boyington's autobiography, Baa Baa Black Sheep. A diagram shown on a whiteboard in the ready room during Starbuck's briefing was taken from a textbook on fighter tactics.

The visual effects in "Scar" were particularly difficult and time-consuming to produce. The last visual effects shots were finished in the week before the episode aired.

In a rare break from the series's cinéma vérité style, director Michael Nankin slows down time as Starbuck remembers Anders in the moments before she swerves from Scar. The episode closes with Stanley Myers's classical guitar piece "Cavatina", the theme from the 1978 film The Deer Hunter.

== Reception ==
Critical reaction to "Scar" was mostly positive. Rose Wojnar of The San Diego Union-Tribune gave "Scar" a B+, praising the "great action scenes and for some gut-wrenching emotional ones" but criticizing the narrative device of cutting back and forth between the final encounter with Scar and earlier action. Keith McDuffee of TV Squad also lamented the "time shifting" but liked the episode overall. Clifton gave "Scar" an A−, praising actress Luciana Carro performance as Kat and the editing. He later elaborated, "I liked 'Scar' as a well-done story, but in the middle of a lackluster and unrepentantly heterogeneous season, I could have done without." Amanda Keith of the Los Angeles Newspaper Group noted that Katee Sackhoff's portrayal of Starbuck had evolved from a "larger-than life character" to one that is "one hundred different kinds of frakked up". Keith called it "a remarkable transformation, and another sign that the [Battlestar Galactica] actors really was [sic] robbed of Emmy glory." Simon Brew of Den of Geek called "Scar" "not one of the best episodes to date, I thought, but an improvement on 'Black Market' [the previous episode]".

Right before the series finale, as part of a retrospective look at the series, Alan Sepinwall of The Star-Ledger included "Scar" on his list of favorite episodes, calling it a "great self-contained show, and one of the best showcases Katee Sackhoff ever got, as we spend an entire hour just living with the Viper pilots and getting a better sense of the emotional toll of war without end for the toughest warrior of them all." Michael Hickerson of Slice of SciFi ranked it as the series's fifth best episode. John Kubicek also ranked it fifth best, calling the scene in which Starbuck toasts the dead pilots "pure magic, and easily my favorite single scene in the history of the show." Kelly Woo of TV Squad ranked "Scar" as the series's eighth best episode. Eric Goldman of IGN ranked Starbuck's showdown with Scar at #19 on his list of the series's top "storylines and moments", calling it a "visually strong battle sequence".
