= Kobol's Last Gleaming =

- Battlestar Galactica episodes
- Episode nos.: Season 1 Episodes 12 & 13
- Directed by: Michael Rymer
- Story by: David Eick
- Teleplay by: Ronald D. Moore
- Original air dates: Part 1: January 17, 2005 (UK); March 25, 2005 (US); Part 2: January 24, 2005 (UK); April 1, 2005 (US)

Guest appearances
- Lorena Gale as Priestess Elosha; Donnelly Rhodes as Sherman Cottle; Nicki Clyne as Cally; Leah Cairns as Racetrack

Episode chronology
← Previous "Colonial Day"	Next → "Scattered"
- Battlestar Galactica season 1

"Kobol's Last Gleaming" is the two-part first-season finale of the reimagined Battlestar Galactica television series.

In the first part, the human fleet discovers the abandoned planet Kobol, the mythical birthplace of humanity, who left here and founded the Twelve Colonies of Kobol elsewhere in the galaxy. A survey team is stranded there by Cylons while President Laura Roslin convinces Starbuck to disobey orders and retrieve an artifact called the Arrow of Apollo. In the second part, Commander William Adama stages a military coup and places Roslin in Galactica's brig. Starbuck retrieves the Arrow and discovers that Boomer, still on Galactica, is a Cylon. This Boomer destroys the Cylon Basestar orbiting Kobol, returns to Galactica, and shoots Commander Adama; the season ends on a cliffhanger.

"Kobol's Last Gleaming" underwent numerous substantial rewrites. It was one of the most expensive episodes of the first season to produce. The episode received favorable critical review. Michael Hickerson of Slice of SciFi ranked it as the fourth best episode of the re-imagined Battlestar Galactica. Simon Brew of Den of Geek called it "just outstanding television."

== Plot ==
=== Part 1 ===
When a habitable planet is found, President Roslin concludes that the planet is Kobol, the mythical birthplace of humanity. Commander Adama wants to begin permanent settlement of Kobol, but Roslin cites scriptures in her belief that Kobol will point the way to Earth. However, this would require retrieving an artifact called the Arrow of Apollo from Caprica; Adama is unwilling to commit vital military resources (particularly the captured Cylon Raider that can make long jumps) when he doesn't believe Earth even exists. Roslin convinces Starbuck to disobey her orders and take the captured Raider to Caprica to retrieve the Arrow of Apollo.

On Caprica, Helo nearly kills the copy of Boomer he has been traveling with but decides to keep her alive.

Afraid that she will hurt someone, Boomer tries to shoot herself but survives. She discusses her angst with Galen Tyrol. Commander Adama sends a survey team down to Kobol in three Colonial Raptors, one of which is shot down by Cylons, leaving several Galactica crew members stranded.

=== Part 2 ===
Starbuck arrives on Caprica and, after a fight with a Number Six, retrieves the Arrow of Apollo. She discovers Helo with Boomer. Helo stops her from killing Boomer: although she is a Cylon, she is also pregnant with his child.

On Kobol, Head Six shows Dr. Baltar a vision of a crib in an ancient Opera House and declares that God has tasked him with protecting the "first of the new generation of God's children."

Adama demands that Roslin resign, since convincing Starbuck to disobey orders violated their power-sharing arrangement where he would make all military decisions and she would oversee the civilians. When she refuses, he sends a team of Marines to Colonial One to arrest her. A standoff ensues between Colonel Tigh and Apollo, and Roslin surrenders to avoid bloodshed. Both she and Apollo are sent to Galactica's brig.

Adama orders Boomer on Galactica to destroy the Cylon Basestar orbiting Kobol: a captured Cylon transponder allows Boomer's Raptor to penetrate the Cylon defenses. The launch system jams, so she is forced to land the Raptor inside the basestar and release the nuclear warhead manually. There she encounters several copies of herself, proving to her that she is a Cylon. She flees in the Raptor, destroys the basestar and returns to Galactica. Under the influence of her Cylon programming, Boomer shoots Adama twice in the torso.

== Characterization ==
Adama: "I didn't know you were that religious."
Roslin: "Neither did I."

According to executive producer Ronald D. Moore, Roslin's character had a secular worldview at the start of the series, but her experience hallucinating the Opera House in "Kobol's Last Gleaming" makes her believe in the Scriptures. She becomes a woman of faith because she considers it logical given the evidence. Nonetheless, it is new enough that she is uncomfortable arguing from religion that Adama should send the Raider to Caprica. Adama is respectful but thoroughly secular by contrast.

According to Moore, Baltar's scene with Boomer before she shoots herself reveals a darker, more manipulative side to his character than had been shown in the series so far. Understanding that Boomer is a Cylon and poses a threat, Baltar encourages her to kill herself, a move Moore says not even Head Six may have thought him capable of.

According to Moore, Baltar wanted to sleep with Starbuck from the scene when they first met, in the earlier episode "Water", and only became more interested as she continued to spurn him in later episodes. Six's reaction in "Kobol's Last Gleaming" to Baltar sleeping with Starbuck is the first indication that Six and Baltar have a relationship that is not strictly in Baltar's head.

According to Moore, Starbuck's devotion to Adama is so strong that rational arguments would be unable to persuade her to disobey his orders. Roslin realized that her only option was to show Starbuck that Adama had betrayed her first, and this strategy works.

== Production ==
Partly because of the large amount of computer-generated imagery (CGI), "Kobol's Last Gleaming" was more expensive to produce than others in the first season. The production team kept costs down on prior episodes in order to have a greater budget available for "Kobol's Last Gleaming". Sci Fi also allocated additional money for it.

=== Writing ===
"Kobol's Last Gleaming" was executive producer David Eick's first time writing for television. According to Moore, Eick mapped out the story while Moore concentrated on rewrites and production details for other episodes. Moore wrote the teleplay.

Several ideas for the plot of "Kobol's Last Gleaming" were considered but abandoned:

- The cliffhanger was originally going to consist of Apollo, Tyrol, Cally, and others pinned down by Cylons in a temple on Kobol. The idea was abandoned due to budget constraints. Also, Roslin was going to still be barricaded in her office at the time Adama is shot.
- It was decided later that Apollo should not be on Kobol at all, but aboard the fleet to participate in the events surrounding the coup and to be present when his father is shot. A plotline that had Tyrol questioning Apollo's command decisions was transferred to Crashdown.
- Another abandoned idea around the Kobol temple had Baltar traveling through an underground passage in the temple, coming to a room where he would hear and recognize a Jimi Hendrix song, and meeting a character played by Dirk Benedict who would introduce himself as God. Reactions were mixed, and Sci Fi network executive Mark Stern nixed the idea, saying it was too hokey. Moore ultimately agreed with this assessment.
- An early conception of the Opera House scene had an orchestra onstage playing a piece that would be recognizable to the audience. Baltar would sit in an empty chair, pick up a violin, and start playing despite not knowing how.
- A scene in which Tyrol persuades Adama to reinstate Specialist Socinus and then berates Socinus was cut due to time constraints. Socinus was sent to Galactica's brig during a prior episode, "Litmus." Moore expressed regret for cutting this scene in his podcast commentary for the second-season episode "Valley of Darkness".
- The writers considered narrating some of "Kobol's Last Gleaming" through "interviews" in which characters spoke directly to the camera. The idea was abandoned for lack of time. Some characters speak to the camera when interviewed by journalist D'Anna Biers in the second-season episode "Final Cut".

The boxing scene was the idea of actors Edward James Olmos and Jamie Bamber, who played Commander Adama and Apollo, respectively; they even choreographed the scene.

Eick pitched the idea of a fight scene between Six and Starbuck about halfway through the first season. The fight was present in every draft of "Kobol's Last Gleaming".

=== Design ===
Scenes on Caprica were given a distinct "look" to contrast them with scenes on Kobol; both planets' surfaces appear in "Kobol's Last Gleaming", and the production team wanted to ensure that audiences would be able to tell them apart at a glance. One element of Caprica's "look" is frequent rain, which is also an acknowledgment of the ecological effects of the Cylon nuclear attack on the planet.

Moore initially advocated for the interior of the Cylon basestar to be a simple white room. Production designer Richard Hudolin and another writer suggested a biomechanical environment, the idea that eventually won out. The design was supposed to resemble but remain distinct from the interior of the stolen Raider. The footage of the Raptor flying through the basestar interior is CGI, but the scenes of Boomer outside the Raptor were filmed on a set.

=== Filming ===
Director Michael Rymer and film editor Dany Cooper made a number of changes from the episode's script:

- Moore originally wrote the teaser as a sequence of extreme close-ups. It also included scenes from Roslin's cancer treatment.
- A scene of Starbuck testing the Raider was cut and footage woven into the scene in which Starbuck steals the Raider.
- Starbuck's flight to Caprica was originally scripted to occur during Part 2; they moved it to the end of Part 1 to augment the action in Part 1 and open up more time to tell the story of Part 2. Moore thought the emotional impact of this scene made it a better candidate to end Part 1 than the original choice, the Raptor crash.

Moore concedes that Roslin's security detail permits Tigh and his Marines to get much closer to Roslin than a real presidential security detail like the United States Secret Service would. He explained that some realism was sacrificed to enhance the drama.

In Starbuck's sex scene, actor Jamie Bamber (Apollo) was filmed as Starbuck's partner until she calls out Lee's name, at which point actor James Callis (Baltar) replaces him. According to Moore, this was done "to establish who Starbuck would rather be with."

In the flaming Raptor sequence in the Part 2 teaser, only the Raptor explosion was CGI. Callis actually reached his hand through flames during the shots where Head Six leads Baltar out of the Raptor. According to Moore, the actors on Battlestar Galactica disliked filming Raptor scenes generally because the space is so cramped, but this reflects reality aboard military transports.

The scene where Boomer encounters the Number Eight copies was shot with motion control photography. Grace Park played every copy and had to move and speak according to a precise rhythm in each shot. Moore called the process very time-consuming and expensive.

Actors Tricia Helfer (Number Six) and Katee Sackhoff (Starbuck) did their own stunts for their fight scene. They trace the beginning of their friendship to their antics on-set filming this scene.

=== Music ===
Rymer asked composer Bear McCreary to write a classical-sounding piece for Baltar's vision of the Opera House. The result was "The Shape of Things to Come", which is closely connected to "Passacaglia", the piece McCreary wrote for the Part 1 teaser. McCreary recalled that Rymer was unsatisfied with earlier versions of the Part 1 teaser music and encouraged McCreary to stop approaching it as a film score. McCreary stopped looking at the footage for inspiration and produced "Passacaglia".

== Reception ==
"Kobol's Last Gleaming" received favorable critical review. Susan Tankersley of Television Without Pity gave Part 1 of "Kobol's Last Gleaming" an A+ and Part 2 an A. David Thomas of AOL's TV Squad called the Raptor crash sequence "[o]ne of the most superb crash scenes in Sci-Fi television history" and said, "the only slow part seemed to be the crash victims on Kobol." Jason Davis of Mania gave Part 1 an A, comparing it favorably with the original series episode "Lost Planet of the Gods", praising the contribution of both Boomers to the emotional tone, and calling the teaser "masterful". He also gave Part 2 an A, calling it better than Part 1 and expressing particular appreciation for the tension between Crashdown and Tyrol, which he described as unconventional in science fiction. Simon Brew of Den of Geek said, "the second part of 'Kobol's Last Gleaming' had me screaming at my television set. ... [T]his is just outstanding television."

Michael Hickerson of Slice of SciFi ranked "Kobol's Last Gleaming" as the series's fourth best episode. Kelly Woo of TV Squad ranked Part 2 second best, writing, "Jaw, floor. Enough said." John Kubicek of BuddyTV ranked Part 2 as the 12th best episode, calling Six and Starbuck's fight scene "one of the best and sexiest fight scenes in the history of television." Eric Goldman of IGN ranked Boomer shooting Adama #6 on his list of the series's top 20 storylines and moments. The twist where Boomer is revealed to be a Cylon was listed at number 98 as part of the "Top 100 Most Unexpected Moments in TV History" by TV Guide and TV Land in December 2005.

== Series context ==
- The conflict between Adama and Roslin in "Kobol's Last Gleaming" is the culmination of tension that has been building since they forged their power-sharing arrangement. Although they have developed a degree of mutual respect, their different priorities make a confrontation inevitable, in Moore's view.
- Adama does not return to command until the fifth episode of the second season, "The Farm". He and Roslin do not reconcile until two episodes later, in "Home, Part 2".
- Crashdown is the ranking officer among the survivors of the Raptor crash, but several of the character's actions are intended to cause the audience to question his leadership. His decisions in the first three episodes of the second season bring him into conflict with the other survivors, especially Tyrol.
- According to Moore, the Caprica storyline of the first season builds to the revelation of Caprica-Boomer's pregnancy in "Kobol's Last Gleaming". In his podcast commentary for "Kobol's Last Gleaming", Moore said why the Cylons were so interested in getting Caprica-Boomer pregnant would be answered in the second season. In the second-season episode "The Farm", Caprica-Boomer explains that "be fruitful" is one of the Cylon God's commandments.
- In "Flesh and Bone", Leoben Conoy prophesied that the human fleet would find Kobol.
- In season 3, D'Anna Biers has a sequence of visions of the Opera House, culminating with a vision of the Final Five Cylons in the episode "The Eye of Jupiter". Roslin, Athena, and Caprica Six begin sharing visions of Athena's daughter Hera in the Opera House in the third-season finale, "Crossroads". The Opera House's true meaning is revealed in the series finale, "Daybreak".
- In the following episode, "Scattered", the cradle in the Opera House is revealed to contain a baby girl, whom Head Six describes as her child with Baltar.
