= Claudette Mink =

Canadian actress (born 1971)

- Born: April 4, 1971 (age 55); Toronto, Ontario, Canada
- Education: George Brown Theatre School
- Occupation: Actress
- Years active: 1993–2013
- Known for: The Guard; Paycheck; Firehouse Dog

Claudette Mink (born April 4, 1971) is a Canadian former actress.

== Education ==
She is a graduate of George Brown Theatre School.

== Filmography ==
=== Film ===
Year	Title	Role	Notes
1993	Deadly Heroes	Marcy Cartowski	
1998	The Taste of Pomegranate	Mabel Howe	
2001	Monkeybone	Typhoid Mary	
2001	Children of the Corn: Revelation	Jamie Lowell	
2003	Paycheck	Sara Rethrick	
2004	Lies Like Truth	Kelly Fitterson	
2004	Alfie	Bitter Girl	
2005	Bad Blood	Frances	Short film
2005	Tamara	Alison Natolly	
2007	Firehouse Dog	Captain Jessie Presley	
2007	Butterfly on a Wheel	Judy Ryan	a.k.a. Shattered a.k.a. Desperate Hours

=== Television ===
Year	Title	Role	Notes
1993	Spenser: Ceremony	Hooker	Television film
1995	The Hardy Boys	Truly Paul	Episode: "All That Glitters"
1995	Kung Fu: The Legend Continues	Lisa	Episode: "The Promise"
1995	Family of Cops	Marci Sullivan	Television film
1996	Coach	Debbee	Episode: "Patching Things Up"
1996	Pacific Blue	Jane Robertson	Episode: "Deja Vu"
1997; 1999	Sliders	Brice / Sheilah	Episode: "Slide Like an Egyptian" (as Sheilah); Episode: "Heavy Metal" (as Brice)
1997	Viper	Louise	Episode: "Out from Oblivion"
1997	Earth: Final Conflict	Janice Greene	Episode: "Scorpions Dream"
1998	The Outer Limits	Jessica Brooks	Episode: "In the Zone"
1998	Conan the Adventurer	Holoch	Episode: "The Child"
1998	Welcome to Paradox	Marcia	Episode: "News from D Street"
1998	Night Man	Trudy Thorpe	Episode: "Book of the Dead"
1998	CHiPs '99	Monica	Television film
1998, 2000	First Wave	Allegra / Shasha	Episode: "Blue Agave" (as Shasha); Episode: "The Plan (as Allegra)
1999	Killer Deal	Kyra Russell	Television film
2000	18 Wheels of Justice	Katie	Episode: "Triple Play"
2000	Freedom	Meagan	2 episodes
2000	Christy: Return to Cutter Gap	Harriet Quimby	Television film
2000	Andromeda	Kae-Lee	Episode: "A Rose in the Ashes"
2001	Doc	Samantha	2 episodes
2001	The Chris Isaak Show	Maria	Episode: "Behind the Isaak"
2001	Return to Cabin by the Lake	Lauren Majors	Television film
2001–2002	Sk8	Whitney Lass	Main cast
2002	L.A. Law: The Movie	Belinda James	Television film
2002	The Twilight Zone	Lea	Episode: "Chosen"
2002	Cold Squad	Tracey Pawlachuck	Episode: "Back in the Day"
2003	John Doe	Turquoise	Episode: "Ashes to Ashes"
2003	Tom Stone	Carmen LaBruce	Episode: "Busted Shoulder"
2003	Before I Say Goodbye	Bonnie Wilson	Television film
2003	The Stranger Beside Me	Victoria	Television film
2003	Rush of Fear	Carly	Television film
2003	The Wonderful World of Disney	Lace Pennamin	Episode: "Phenomenon II"
2004	Kingdom Hospital	Reporter Celeste Daldry	Recurring role
2004	The Days	Tyler	Recurring role
2004	Dead Like Me	Jeannie Bead	Episode: "Rites of Passage"
2004	Smallville	Corinne Hartford	Episode: "Bound"
2005	Ladies Night	Susan Vercillino	Television film
2005	24	Kelly Girard	Episode: "Day 4: 11:00 p.m.-12:00 a.m."
2005	Best Friends	Claudia Hartnell	Television film
2006	Battlestar Galactica	Shevon	Episode: "Black Market"
2006	The L Word	Marlene	Episode: "Losing the Light"
2006	The Evidence	Mrs. Tafanelli	Episode: "Wine and Die"
2006	Men in Trees	Kiki	Episode: "Pilot"
2008	The Guard	Laura Nelson	Main cast (season 1)
2009	Harper's Island	Katherine Wellington	Recurring role
2009	Reaper	Cindy	Episode: "The Good Soil"
2009	Fringe	Captain Diane Burgess	Episode: "Fracture"
2009	Web of Desire	Finn Connors	Television film
2012	Smart Cookies	Erica	Television film
2012	The Haunting Hour: The Series	Painting Mom	Episode: "The Girl in the Painting"
2013	Romeo Killer: The Chris Porco Story	Betsy Masters	Television film; final role

== Awards and nominations ==
Year	Awards	Category	Nominated work	Result	Refs
2008	Leo Awards	Best Lead Performance by a Female in a Dramatic Series	The Guard for the episode "Coming Through a Fog"	Nominated	
