= Luciana Carro =

Canadian actress

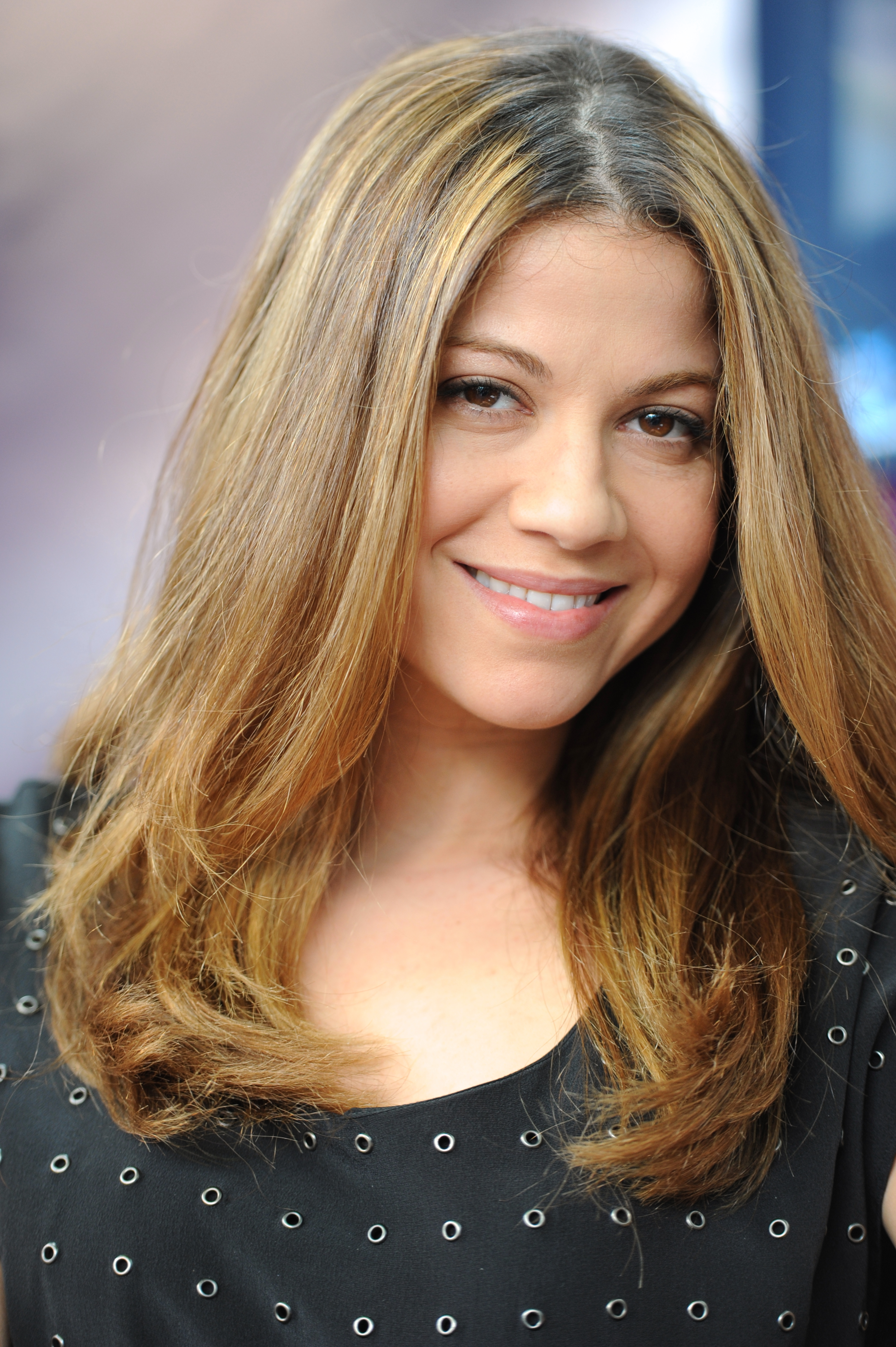
- Carro in 2012
- Born: March 23, 1981 (age 45); Toronto, Ontario, Canada
- Occupation: Actress
- Years active: 2002–present

Luciana Carro (born March 23, 1981) is a Canadian actress best known for her appearances on the television series Battlestar Galactica, Caprica, and Falling Skies and in movies such as Two for the Money and Dr. Dolittle 3.

== Early life ==
Carro was born in Toronto, Ontario, Canada. She was encouraged to act by her parents as a way of overcoming her shyness. With the encouragement of her high school drama teacher Gerry Campbell (father of Neve Campbell), she attended theater school.

== Career ==
Carro began her career with roles in The Chris Isaak Show, Smallville, and The L Word. These led to a part in Battlestar Galactica TV series as Louanne "Kat" Katraine. Like many characters, Kat was intended as a one-off, appearing as a trainee Viper pilot, but producers liked Carro's performance and made Kat a recurring role. Katraine became a rival to Starbuck and at times the Galactica's CAG.

Carro subsequently starred in Dr. Dolittle 3 and alongside Al Pacino in Two for the Money. She was also cast in the recurring roles of Stephanie Meyer in Everwood, Priyah Magnus in Caprica, Crazy Lee in Falling Skies, and Anana in Helix.

== Filmography ==
Year	Title	Role	Notes
2002	Point Blank	Maria	Episode: "Scam Artists"
2002–2004	The Chris Isaak Show	Tanya	7 episodes
2003	Da Vinci's Inquest	Carmen	Episode: "The Ducks Are Too Depressing"; Episode: "You Got Monkey Chatter"
2003	Peacemakers	Elena	Episode: "No Excuse"
2003	Mob Princess	Female Bike Courier	TV movie
2003	Smallville	Talon Waitress	Episode: "Rush"
2004	I Want to Marry Ryan Banks	Surfer Girl #1	TV movie
2004	Still Life	Rosa	Episode: "Caught"; Episode: "Not Fade Away"
2004	Passageway	Gianna	Short film
2004	The Collector	Tipsy Woman	Episode: "The Rapper"
2004	White Chicks	Waitress	
2004–2005	The L Word	Lisa	3 episodes
2004–2006	Battlestar Galactica	Louanne 'Kat' Katraine	18 episodes
2005	Murder at the Presidio	Cpl. Diana Phillips	TV movie
2005	Young Blades	Juanita	Episode: "The Invincible Sword"
2005	Two for the Money	Gail	
2005	Smallville	Karen	Episode: "Thirst"
2006	Killer Instinct	Eljay	Episode: "Love Hurts"
2006	Dr. Dolittle 3	Brooklyn Webster	main antagonist
2006	Everwood	Stephanie Meyer	4 episodes
2007	Blades of Glory	Sam	
2007	Hidden Palms	Kaylie	Episode: "Party Hardy"
2007	Snowglobe	Gina Moreno	TV movie
2009	Phantom Racer	Deputy Monroe	TV movie
2010	Urgency	Sofia	
2010	Caprica	Priyah Magnus	3 episodes
2011	The Icarus II Project	Agent Owens	3 episodes
2011	Traveling at the Speed of Life	Jody	
2012–2013	Falling Skies	Crazy Lee	Recurring; 13 episodes
2014–2015	Helix	Anana	Recurring; 7 episodes appeared 8 episodes credited
2016	Supernatural	Melissa Harper	Episode: "Love Hurts"
