= Karl Agathon =

Character in Battlestar Galactica

Karl C. Agathon
- Battlestar Galactica character
- Tahmoh Penikett as Karl "Helo" Agathon
- First appearance: Miniseries
- Last appearance: "Daybreak"
- Portrayed by: Tahmoh Penikett

In-universe information
- Alias: Helo
- Species: Human
- Gender: Male
- Title(s): Lieutenant (BSG Miniseries - Episode 3.05); Captain (Episode 3.06)
- Colony: Caprica
- Affiliation: Colonial Fleet

Karl C. Agathon (callsign "Helo") is a fictional character on the re-imagined Battlestar Galactica TV series, portrayed by Tahmoh Penikett.

== Appearances ==
=== Background ===
Agathon is an Electronic Countermeasures Officer, part of a two-person Colonial Raptor crew based on the Battlestar Galactica, and is paired with Sharon "Boomer" Valerii before the Cylon destruction of the Twelve Colonies. Unlike other major characters such as Kara "Starbuck" Thrace or Gaius Baltar, the series reveals little about Agathon's life before the events of the series. It is confirmed Helo is a Caprican, which is partly why he and Starbuck knew each other.

The (unofficial) backstory Tahmoh Penikett and Katee Sackhoff came up with to explain a comment from Thrace in "Scattered" that she and Helo "go way back" is the two were old friends for a long time who most likely attended the academy together as cadets and as "drinking buddies".

=== Miniseries ===
During the Cylon attack, Agathon and Sharon's Raptor is damaged, he is hit in the leg and they are forced to land on Caprica. While making repairs, they are mobbed by a group of survivors desperate to get off the planet. A lottery is used to decide who will be allowed to escape due to the Raptor's limited space. Agathon sacrifices his own seat to allow Dr Gaius Baltar, discovered in the crowd, to survive. Boomer lifts off with refugees aboard and Helo is left on the nuked and occupied Caprica with only a med kit and sidearm.

=== Series ===
After the Raptor leaves, Agathon flees into the wilderness and tries to elude Cylon forces, surviving by using anti-radiation injections and the other contents of his survival kit. Eventually, he is captured by a Number Six copy, but is rescued by Valerii (unknown to Agathon, his rescuer is another copy of Cylon model Number Eight). Valerii's true motive in accompanying Agathon is the participation in a Cylon experiment designed to attempt to create a Cylon–human hybrid offspring. The Cylons track Agathon's progress toward a military base in Delphi, placing him in situations designed to result in affection and ultimately love towards Valerii. The experiment results in Valerii becoming pregnant, though as an unintended side effect, she falls in love with him. Agathon soon discovers the truth about her Cylon nature after spotting another Number Eight copy while trying to infiltrate the Delphi military base. Believing that he is being led into a trap, he runs from the base and Valerii.

She eventually catches up to him and reveals she is pregnant. Despite shooting her in the shoulder, Agathon realizes he can't bring himself to kill her and instead, at her urging, takes her with him to the Delphi museum. It is there he is reunited with fellow Galactica pilot Kara "Starbuck" Thrace, who is on a special mission from President Laura Roslin to recover the Arrow of Apollo. After nearly being killed by Thrace, Valerii steals the Cylon Raider and flies off. Agathon and Thrace make their way first to Thrace's old apartment to retrieve a new mode of transport (an old army truck she owned) and then into the woods in search of another military base. While stopping to get their bearings, they run into a group of Pyramid players-turned resistance fighters. After Thrace is wounded and captured by the Cylons, Agathon and the others track her down and attempt to rescue her from the hospital where she is being held. They are, surprisingly, aided by Valerii, who returns in a stolen Heavy Raider. With the Arrow of Apollo in hand, Agathon, Thrace and Valerii leave Caprica and make their way to Kobol to rejoin Roslin.

Upon rejoining the Colonial survivors aboard the Astral Queen, Agathon pulls his gun on Lee Adama in order to stop him from shooting Valerii, whom Adama blames for the attempt another Valerii copy makes on his father's life. Later, while searching for the Tomb of Athena on the surface of Kobol, Agathon admits to Valerii he still loves and trusts her.

After finding the Tomb of Athena, Agathon returns with the group to Galactica, almost three months after being MIA and presumed dead. His homecoming is bittersweet; Helo's former friends turn their backs on him due to his love for a Cylon, let alone one whose doppelgänger attempted to murder Commander William Adama. Helo finds support from Starbuck and Chief Petty Officer Galen Tyrol, who was in love with the original Galactica crew member version of Sharon before her betrayal of the fleet and death. Helo eventually is accepted by the crew when he recommends the Blackbird should be encased in carbon-composite skin to make it a stealth ship.

After the appearance of the Battlestar Pegasus, Agathon witnesses Sharon's torture and attempted rape by Lieutenant Alastair Thorne, a Pegasus crew member and Cylon interrogator. Along with Tyrol, Helo stops Thorne from raping Sharon but in the process, they accidentally kill him. (This incident is subject to subtly different editing. In the DVD version of the episode, they interrupt Thorne while he is raping Sharon; in the broadcast version, they arrive just in time to prevent it.) Admiral Cain's summary trial and death sentence of Agathon and Tyrol bring Galactica to a confrontation with Pegasus. Although the death sentence is not carried out, Agathon and Tyrol remain in the brig, where Tyrol ultimately gives Helo his blessing for a relationship with Sharon. The two are eventually released by Colonel Jack Fisk, with all charges being dropped.

Following his captivity on Pegasus, Helo is reunited with his version of Sharon as her pregnancy continues. When President Laura Roslin proclaims her intention to force Sharon to undergo an abortion to eliminate the perceived threat Hera Agathon (Helo and Sharon's child) represents to the fleet, Helo begs Admiral Adama to overrule Roslin and allow himself and the pregnant Sharon to leave the fleet and find a world where they could live in peace. Adama refuses and Roslin rescinds her demand for a forced abortion when Gaius Baltar extracts blood from the unborn child for use as a cure for Roslin's terminal cancer. This leads to Roslin betraying Helo again by ordering Helo and Sharon's newborn daughter to be taken from the hospital after she is born. The infant's death is faked and Helo is given what are ostensibly her ashes, which he and Tyrol release into space.

Following the discovery and settlement of the planet New Caprica, Agathon remains on Galactica as part of her skeleton crew. He is promoted to captain and serves as Galactica's executive officer (XO), replacing Colonel Saul Tigh. Karl Agathon marries his version of Sharon Valerii, who is commissioned as a lieutenant in the Colonial Fleet and takes the call sign "Athena". He later assists Lee Adama in the latter's effort to lose weight.

During an attempt by Galactica to spread a virus to wipe out the Cylon race, Agathon disobeys orders and sabotages a key part of the plan because he considers such an action to be genocidal.

When Colonel Tigh finally returns to the position of Galactica's XO after a long depression brought on by his experiences on New Caprica (in particular his execution of his wife, Ellen, for collaboration with the Cylons), Agathon returns to the flight line. He pilots one of the Raptors used to guide the fleet through a nearly un-navigable and highly radioactive stellar cluster. He becomes one of the second highest pilots left after the deaths of Kara "Starbuck" Thrace and Louanne "Kat" Katraine. He is next in line with Ricky "Two Times" Richardson and Marcia "Showboat" Case, respectively.

Two weeks after the death of Kara, Helo takes over as C.A.G. (Commander, Air Group) from the still visibly shaken Lee Adama, who is subsequently removed by Admiral Adama. Days later, he once again temporarily replaces Col. Tigh as XO, when it becomes apparent the latter has returned to the bottle. Helo returns to his duties as CAG after Colonel Tigh returns to duty. When Starbuck returns, Helo is placed second in command on the Demetrius in the mission to find earth. During the mission to destroy the Hub, Helo rescued the Number Three D'Anna before the Hub was destroyed.

During the mutiny, Helo was beaten unconscious by the mutineers and thrown in the brig along with his wife and daughter. After the mutiny was put down, he and his family returned to life as usual. This equilibrium was disrupted when Boomer, the Raptor pilot he had formerly served with, impersonated his wife and allowed him to seduce her (while Athena, bound in a closet, watched in helpless fury) and then abducted Hera for study. Boomer fled with the child to the Colony, where John Cavil intended to dissect her to determine the secrets leading to her conception. After the abduction, with Athena in a listless depression, Helo begged Adama to let him take out a Raptor for a search-and-rescue mission, despite the risk he would not find her or return. (Adama, stern if sympathetic, denied the request.)

When Adama finally obtained the location of the Colony, Helo and Athena were among the many who volunteered to crew Galactica for the attack-and-rescue mission. He devised the plan of using Raptors as boarding craft, inserting small teams of Marines into the Colony—a plan made extremely dangerous by the dense asteroid agglomeration and gravitational distortions caused by the Colony's orbit around a black hole. He and Athena were the only Raptor crew to survive insertion, combat and withdrawal but (with a little help from a repentant Boomer) retrieved their daughter. Soon after, Galactica was boarded and Helo was shot in the thigh. Hera fled the scene and despite knowing he would die of blood loss unless Sharon attended him, Helo demanded she protects their daughter.

Helo did not appear again until the last few minutes of the episode. Though he used a walking stick to counter his limp, he was still alive, still mobile, and evidently not severely distressed by his injury; instead, he bantered with Sharon over what they would teach Hera (and who should get to teach her) on this new planet called Earth. While Karl and Sharon Agathon passed namelessly into history, Hera was eventually identified by Earth scientists as "Mitochondrial Eve".

== Concept and creation ==
=== Character origin ===
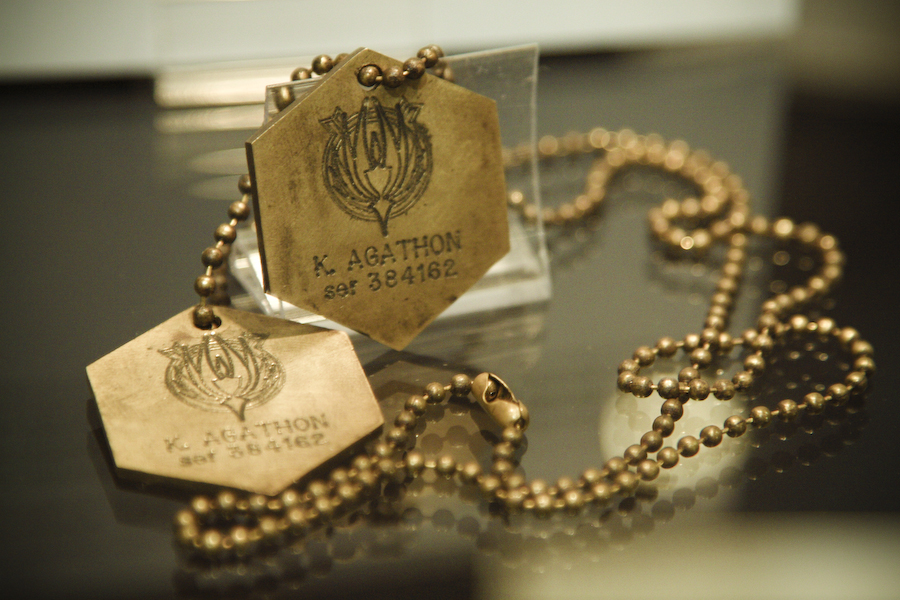
Karl Agathon's dog tags

Helo was originally conceived as a "red-shirt" character. After stranding him on the post-nuclear attack Caprica, the writers had no further plans for the character and intended his fate to be that he died (off-screen) in the radiation that followed the nuking of the planet. But Penikett impressed showrunners, and fans took a liking to the character and wanted to know what happened to him after he was left on Caprica. The producers revised their plans for the series to include the character and his activities on Caprica after the mini-series.

=== Name ===
Like many of the characters on the series, his name has its origins in ancient Greece, Agathon being the name of an Athenian tragic poet. The Greek proverbial phrase kalon k'agathon ("the beautiful and the good") — also written as kalos k'agathos — was used to describe the ideal man, the epitome of both aesthetics and ethics, as well as the Form of the Good in Platonic philosophy. Helo's full name, Karl C. Agathon, wasn't revealed until the release of "33" — after the writers revised their original plans and expanded the character's storyline. His call sign, "Helo," could possibly originate from the Greek Titan Helios, though it is also military slang for a helicopter.

Agathon is also the name of a Prince of Troy in the Iliad. King Priam scolds Agathon and his 8 brothers for being cowards after Hector is killed by Achilles. On page 475, beginning on line 263 in Book 24 of Stanley Lombardo's translation:

"And he [Priam] waded through them, scattering them
With his staff. Then he called to his sons
In a harsh voice--Helenus and Paris,
Agathon, Pammon, Antiphnus, Polities,
Deiphobus, Hippothous, and noble Dius--"
