= Sherman Cottle =

Character in Battlestar Galactica (2004)

Dr. Sherman Cottle
- Battlestar Galactica character
- First appearance: "Act of Contrition"
- Last appearance: "Daybreak"
- Portrayed by: Donnelly Rhodes

In-universe information
- Species: Human
- Gender: Male
- Title: Major
- Colony: Unknown
- Affiliation: Colonial Fleet

Sherman Cottle is a fictional character in the reimagined Battlestar Galactica series. Played by Donnelly Rhodes, Cottle is the Battlestar Galactica's Chief Medical Officer.

== Character analysis and reception ==
Geoff Ryman holds Cottle as an example of Battlestar Galactica's rich but efficient characterization, presented to the audience of mid-2000s America as a "crusty leftover from an earlier age by having him smoke cigarettes". Erica Mongé-Greer describes him: "experienced, a gruff exterior, kind-hearted, and very knowledgeable."

Lorna Jowett uses Cottle to highlight the show's commentary on contemporary discussions around women's reproductive care, he along with Gaius Baltar and Cylon Simon show "men are in charge of reproductive science". Later they note how a character escapes her family who is opposed to abortion in hope that Cottle will help her, though ultimately it is President Laura Roslin who makes the decision. As one example in an examination on whether American television could affect stigma of abortion care in the real-world, Gretchen Sisson and Katrina Kimport note Cottle's matter-of-fact approach to abortion care, also noting that he later advised the character in question to seek political asylum. They say this as an example of "providing a social good, thereby countering provider stigma."

Rikk Mulligan compares Cottle's outraged reaction to the use of rape as an interrogation tactic to Americans' outraged reaction to the treatment of detainees by coalition forces in the Iraq War in the mid-2000s. However, to Lesley Henderson and Simon Carter, while Cottle symbolizes "concerns about the future of humanity, he also presents us with a discourse of hope, an idealised (possibly unrealistic) view of the tensions that the caring health sciences must navigate in a world engaged in a 'war on terror'." They describe his actions in the show "as signifying an ethical resistance to the all-encompassing needs of the military in times of war".

According to Jowett, the character is also used explore stereotypes of science in media. To Jowett, Cottle's portrayal is partly in moral contrast to Baltar who demonstrates science as aloof and amoral. Cottle's constant cigarette smoking is used to distinguish him from Baltar who occasionally smokes fine cigars. Jowett points out that the way Cottle converses with other characters with a down-to-earth manner and acceptance of his nickname, "Doc", distinguishes him from Baltar who relies on technobabble, and angrily rejects being referred to as "Doc". Jowett also describes how the character portrays an alternative to the immoral, represented by the genocidal Dr. Robert, as Cottle's medical ethics and humanity towards patients provide contrast with such behavior.

On the return of Roslin's cancer, Amy Kind explains, Cottle also presents a dilemma that Cylons do not face. Cottle advises Roslin that the treatment "would radically and irreversibly change her psychological makeup and capabilities", and Kind goes on to contrast this with the abilities of Cylons to retain memories upon resurrection, further analyzing the nature of identity and death.

In his essay How To Be Happy After the End of the World, Erik Baldwin compares Doctor Cottle, who fixes humans, to Chief Tyrol, a mechanic who fixes spaceships. Upon this, Baldwin applies Aristotle's philosophy from Nicomachean Ethics to examine the purpose of humanity in an end-of-the-world scenario.

In another analysis of human and Cylon identity, Paul Booth notes that Cottle and his surgical apron demonstrate the lack of difference between human and Cylon blood.

=== Further characterization ===
In a scene where several characters allow animosity to lead to a boxing match, Doc Cottle wants to stop the fight, while the President gives advice to a participant.

In The Theology of Battlestar Galactica: American Christianity in the 2004-2009 Television Series, Kevin Wetmore notes that as chief medical officer in the fleet, Cottle suggests prayer to President Roslin, whose cancer diagnosis has just been confirmed.
