= Music of Battlestar Galactica (2004 TV series) =

The music of the 2004 TV series Battlestar Galactica is a body of work largely credited to the composers Bear McCreary and Richard Gibbs. The music of Battlestar Galactica displays a variety of ethnic influences and generally does not conform to the "orchestral" style of many science fiction scores.

The music of Battlestar Galactica makes use of the technique called "leitmotif". A leitmotif is a phrase or melodic cell that signifies a character, place, plot element, mood, idea, relationship or other specific part of the story. It is commonly used in modern film scoring as a device to mentally anchor certain parts of a film to the soundtrack. Of chief importance for a leitmotif is that it must be recognizable enough for a listener to latch onto while being flexible enough to undergo variation and development. However, the development of leitmotifs was not part of the composers' (Bear McCreary) original plan:

For a show that set out to avoid 'themes,' Battlestar Galactica has certainly ended up with quite a few.

— Bear McCreary, Bear's Battlestar Galactica Blog.

== Background ==
When he began work on the series, McCreary was asked to produce something completely different from the "gleaming, brassy sound" of the original series. To save on expenses McCreary typically works with 9-10 musicians. For some of the series' more important episodes, he requested a full orchestra: "I don't need to put up a fight for it. The episodes that require an orchestral presence are self-evident, and everybody at Sci Fi and the producers know it's money well-spent."

Orchestral music began to be introduced near the end of the first season. In the beginning, producers preferred other sounds:

They didn't want an orchestral sound. So when I started the series, I had an extremely limited palette – a lot of percussion. I only had a handful of instruments that could play anything melodic. As the show went on I started developing motific ideas that started coming into the texture that represented certain characters. Towards the end of the first season one of the producers turned to me during one of the playbacks and said, "Can we get some of that Boomer theme right there? I want to hear the Boomer theme!" I thought to myself: we’d never had a discussion that said it was okay for me to start writing a Boomer Theme, but I happened to have done it, and they noticed it, and from that point on I started exploring other possibilities once I realized that this show could develop.

— Bear McCreary, The Score: Bear McCreary – From "Battlestar Galactica" to "Terminator", Cinefantatique Online

McCreary was interested in producing an organic sound using real instruments.

This sort of opened up the floodgates for anything non-orchestral that I could find, and LA is a great town to find musicians who play unusual instruments. So it ultimately benefited the show, because I started writing for non-traditional instruments and I still had to find ways for those instruments to speak musically the same way that an orchestral score would – meaning that the drama still had to be there; I just couldn’t use twenty-four horns and sixty strings – I had a couple of frame drums and a duduk! The irony is that by the end of the first season they were asking for some orchestra, and we were putting some orchestral strings back into the mix, but it was in a very different context. The strings, when they come up, suddenly sound special and unique, and when those episodes come up, I think viewers are subconsciously drawn to them because it sounds bigger, whereas if we plastered every episode with strings that effect would be lost.

— Bear McCreary, The Score: Bear McCreary – From "Battlestar Galactica" to "Terminator", Cinefantatique Online

== Soundtrack releases ==
To date, seven CDs of soundtrack music from Battlestar Galactica have been released for sale. All seven albums have been released on the La-La Land Records label.

Season 4 is a 2-CD set, with an overview of the season's music cues making up Disc 1, and the score for the Series Finale "Daybreak" (Parts 1, 2 and 3) on Disc 2.

=== Miniseries soundtrack ===
The soundtrack for the 2003 Battlestar Galactica Miniseries was largely scored by Richard Gibbs. The total running time of the album is 1:08:16.

Many of the cues from the Miniseries soundtrack have been re-used as incidental or background music in the regular series beginning in 2004. For example, the track "Starbuck's Recon" plays over the final scene on Caprica in "Tigh Me Up, Tigh Me Down".

1. "Are You Alive? / Battlestar Galactica Main Title" [5:28]
2. "Goodbye, Baby" [2:24]
3. "Starbuck Buck Buck" [1:49]
4. "To Kiss or Not to Kiss" [2:42]
5. "Six Sex" [1:48]
6. "Deep Sixed" [1:59]
7. "The Day Comes" [1:08]
8. "Counterattack" [2:40]
9. "Cylons Fire" [1:34]
10. "A Call to Arms" [1:03]
11. "Apollo to the Rescue" [1:56]
12. "Launch Vipers" [4:26]
13. "Seal the Bulkheads" [2:10]
14. "The Lottery Ticket" [3:06]
15. "Eighty-Five Dead" [1:23]
16. "Inbound" [1:23]
17. "Apollo Is Gone / Starbuck Returns" [2:19]
18. "The Storm and the Dead" [2:40]
19. "Thousands Left Behind" [2:09]
20. "Silica Pathways" [3:32]
21. "Reunited" [1:56]
22. "The Sense of Six" [3:01]
23. "Starbuck's Recon" [1:11]
24. "Battle" [7:40]
25. "Good Night" [2:38]
26. "By Your Command" [1:56]

=== Season 1 soundtrack ===
Battlestar Galactica Season 1 soundtrack cover art

Gibbs opted not to devote full time to the regular series' production, due to scheduling conflicts: he wished to devote more time to scoring theatrical films. As a result, Bear McCreary scored "33" (which was actually the first episode) and then stayed on as soundtrack composer for all subsequent episodes of the series. McCreary is credited as sole composer for 26 of the 30 tracks on the Season 1 soundtrack. The total running time of the album is 1:18:19. Irish singer Lilis Ó Laoire sings in the Irish language on "Wander My Friends".

Many of the leitmotifs of the show were introduced in this opus, including the Adama family theme, Boomer's theme, the Cylon theme and Starbuck's theme.

1. "Prologue" [0:40]
2. "Main Title (U.S. Theme)" [1:05]
3. "Helo Chase" (from "33") [1:31]
4. "The Olympic Carrier" (from "33") [5:48]
5. "Helo Rescued" [1:02] (from "33")
6. "A Good Lighter" (from "The Hand of God") [1:56]
7. "The Thousandth Landing" (from "Act of Contrition") [3:08]
8. "Two Funerals" (from "Act of Contrition") [3:26]
9. "Starbuck Takes On All Eight" (from "Act of Contrition") [3:46]
10. "Forgiven" (from "You Can't Go Home Again") [1:31]
11. "The Card Game" (from "Act of Contrition") [3:04]
12. "Starbuck On the Red Moon" (from "You Can't Go Home Again") [2:01]
13. "Helo In the Warehouse" (from "Litmus") [2:02]
14. "Baltar Speaks With Adama" (from "Six Degrees of Separation") [1:55]
15. "Two Boomers" (from "Six Degrees of Separation") [1:48]
16. "Battlestar Operatica" (from "Tigh Me Up, Tigh Me Down") [2:36]
17. "The Dinner Party" (from "Tigh Me Up, Tigh Me Down") [3:14]
18. "Battlestar Muzaktica" (from "Colonial Day") [1:43]
19. "Baltar Panics" (from "Six Degrees of Separation") [1:46]
20. "Boomer Flees" (from "Flesh and Bone") [1:17]
21. "Flesh and Bone" (from "Flesh and Bone") [4:06]
22. "Battle On the Asteroid" (from "The Hand of God") [6:53]
23. "Wander My Friends" (from "The Hand of God") [2:58]
24. "Passacaglia" (from "Kobol's Last Gleaming, Part I") [5:16]
25. "Kobol's Last Gleaming" (from "Kobol's Last Gleaming, Parts I and II") [2:49]
26. "Destiny" (from "Kobol's Last Gleaming, Part II") [4:44]
27. "The Shape of Things to Come" (from "Kobol's Last Gleaming, Part II") [2:56]
28. "Bloodshed" (from "Kobol's Last Gleaming, Part II") [1:51]
29. "Re-Cap" [0:37]
30. "Main Title (U.K. Theme)" [1:05]

=== Season 2 soundtrack ===
Battlestar Galactica Season 2 soundtrack cover art

McCreary is again credited as the primary composer for the Season 2 soundtrack; Gibbs retains his credit for the series' main title music. The total running time of the album is 1:18:53.

In his sleeve notes for the album, McCreary singles out two pieces for particular attention: the re-arrangement of Stu Phillips and Glen A. Larson's original theme for Battlestar Galactica to become the "Colonial Anthem" as it appears in "Final Cut"; and the string quartet "A Promise to Return", dedicated to the recovery of the lead violinist, Ludvig Girdland, who was severely injured in a car crash a month after the recording.

The Season 2 soundtrack also featured the first statement of Tigh's theme (in track number 6, entitled "Martial Law") and the Roslin and Adama theme (in track number 13, entitled "Roslin and Adama").

1. "Colonial Anthem" ("Theme from Battlestar Galactica") (from "Final Cut") [4:02]
2. "Baltar's Dream" (from "Valley of Darkness") [2:45]
3. "Escape from the Farm" (from "The Farm") [3:09]
4. "A Promise to Return" (from "The Farm") [3:03], performed by the Supernova String Quartet
5. "Allegro" (from "Home, Part 2") [4:59]
6. "Martial Law" (from "Fragged") [1:51]
7. "Standing in the Mud" (from "Black Market") [1:45]
8. "Pegasus" (from "Pegasus") [2:46]
9. "Lords of Kobol" (from "Pegasus") [2:50], featuring Raya Yarbrough, vocals
10. "Something Dark is Coming" (from "Lay Down Your Burdens, Part 1") [8:51]
11. "Scar" (from "Scar") [2:26]
12. "Epiphanies" (from "Epiphanies") [2:43]
13. "Roslin and Adama" (from "Resurrection Ship, Parts 1 and 2") [2:49]
14. "Gina Escapes" (from "Resurrection Ship, Part 2") [2:00]
15. "Dark Unions" (from "Lay Down Your Burdens, Part 2") [2:53]
16. "The Cylon Prisoner" (from "Pegasus") [3:51], featuring Bt4, vocals
17. "Prelude to War" (from "Pegasus" and "Resurrection Ship, Parts 1 and 2") [8:22]
18. "Reuniting the Fleet" (from "Home, Parts 1 and 2") [2:45]
19. "Roslin Confesses" (from "Lay Down Your Burdens, Part 2") [2:09]
20. "One Year Later" (from "Lay Down Your Burdens, Part 2") [1:43]
21. "Worthy of Survival" (from "Lay Down Your Burdens, Part 2" and "Exodus Part 2") [3:35]
22. "Battlestar Galactica Main Title" [0:45], music by Richard Gibbs; engineered and mixed by Gordon Fordyce; featuring Michael Now and Caitanya Riggan, vocals
23. "Black Market" (from "Black Market") [5:48], featuring Steve Bartek, guitar

=== Season 3 soundtrack ===
Battlestar Galactica Season 3 soundtrack cover art

The official soundtrack for Battlestar Galactica's third season was released October 23, 2007. Several previously established themes are re-visited: for example, the Adama family theme ("Admiral and Commander"), Starbuck's theme (in the cues taken from "Maelstrom") and the "Worthy of Survival" theme ("Gentle Execution"). "Wayward Soldier" and "Violence and Variations" develop the second season's use of strings, as exemplified by "Prelude to War". New thematic elements include Kat's theme ("Kat's Sacrifice") and the Apollo-Starbuck love theme ("Under the Wing").

1. "A Distant Sadness" (from "Occupation") [2:50], featuring Raya Yarbrough, vocals
2. "Precipice" (from "Precipice") [4:52]
3. "Admiral and Commander" (from "Exodus, Parts 1 and 2") [3:16]
4. "Storming New Caprica" (from "Exodus, Part 2") [7:48]
5. "Refugees Return" (from "Exodus, Part 2") [3:43]
6. "Wayward Soldier" (from "Hero") [4:17]
7. "Violence and Variations" (from "Unfinished Business") [7:42]
8. "The Dance" (from "Unfinished Business") [2:33]
9. "Adama Falls" (from "Unfinished Business") [1:46]
10. "Under the Wing" (from "Maelstrom") [1:11]
11. "Battlestar Sonatica" (from "Torn") [4:44], performed by Bear McCreary, piano
12. "Fight Night" (from "Unfinished Business") [2:27]
13. "Kat's Sacrifice" (from "The Passage") [2:46]
14. "Someone to Trust" (from "Taking a Break from All Your Worries") [3:09]
15. "The Temple of Five" (from "The Eye of Jupiter") [2:44]
16. "Dirty Hands" (from "Dirty Hands") [3:32]
17. "Gentle Execution" (from "Exodus, Part 2") [3:28]
18. "Mandala in the Clouds" (from "Maelstrom") [4:10]
19. "Deathbed and Maelstrom" (from "Maelstrom" and "He That Believeth in Me") [5:53]
20. "Heeding the Call" (from "Crossroads, Part 2") [2:11]
21. "All Along the Watchtower" (from "Crossroads, Part 2") [3:33], featuring Bt4, vocals; words and music by Bob Dylan; adapted, arranged, and produced by Bear McCreary

=== Season 4 soundtrack ===
Battlestar Galactica Season 4 soundtrack cover art

The track listing for the fourth season soundtrack was announced by Bear McCreary on his blog on 19 June 2009. The first disc of the two-disc set consists of cues from the main body of season four, excluding "Razor" and "Daybreak"; the second disc comprises almost the full score of "Daybreak", the series finale.

Disc 1:

1. "Gaeta’s Lament" (from "Guess What’s Coming to Dinner?") [4:49], featuring Alessandro Juliani, vocals
2. "The Signal" (from "Revelations") [5:09]
3. "Resurrection Hub" (from "The Hub") [3:40]
4. "The Cult of Baltar" (from "He That Believeth in Me" and "Escape Velocity") [5:42], featuring Raya Yarbrough
5. "Farewell Apollo" (from "Six of One") [2:55]
6. "Roslin Escapes" (from "Blood on the Scales") [2:55]
7. "Among the Ruins" (from "Sometimes a Great Notion") [7:44]
8. "Laura Runs" (from "A Disquiet Follows My Soul") [2:21]
9. "Cally Descends" (from "The Ties That Bind") [3:08]
10. "Funeral Pyre" (from "Sometimes a Great Notion") [3:57], featuring Kandyse McClure
11. "Roslin and Adama Reunited" (from "The Hub") [1:59]
12. "Gaeta’s Lament" (Instrumental) (from "Guess What’s Coming to Dinner?") [4:50]
13. "Elegy" (from "Someone to Watch Over Me") [2:55]
14. "The Alliance" (from "Revelations") [2:30]
15. "Blood on the Scales" (from "The Oath" and "Blood on the Scales") [5:19]
16. "Grand Old Lady" (from "Islanded in a Stream of Stars")[0:51]
17. "Kara Remembers" (from "Someone to Watch Over Me") [3:28]
18. "Boomer Takes Hera" (from "Someone to Watch Over Me") [2:39]
19. "Dreilide Thrace Sonata No. 1" (from "Someone to Watch Over Me") [5:35]
20. "Diaspora Oratorio" (from "Revelations") [4:52]

Disc 2 (all from "Daybreak"):

1. "Caprica City, Before the Fall" [4:34]
2. "Laura’s Baptism" [2:40]
3. "Adama in the Memorial Hallway" [2:11]
4. "The Line" [3:57]
5. "Assault on the Colony" [15:07]
6. "Baltar’s Sermon" [4:25]
7. "Kara’s Coordinates" [4:21]
8. "Earth" [3:08]
9. "Goodbye Sam" [2:11]
10. "The Heart of the Sun" [3:20]
11. "Starbuck Disappears" [2:09]
12. "So Much Life" [5:01]
13. "An Easterly View" [4:23]
14. "The Passage of Time" [1:18]

=== Razor/The Plan soundtrack ===
The next soundtrack, consisting entirely of music from Razor and The Plan, neither of which had previously had music featured on a soundtrack, was released on February 23, 2010. The track list is as follows:

1. "Apocalypse" (Theme from "The Plan") [4:06], featuring Vocals by Raya Yarbrough & Guitars by Scott Ian of Heavy Metal band Anthrax
2. "Razor Main Title" (from "Razor") [2:13]
3. "Arriving at Pegasus" (from "Razor") [2:27]
4. "The Plan Main Title" (from "The Plan") [4:33]
5. "Attack on the Scorpion Shipyards" (from "Razor") [3:37]
6. "Apocalypse, Pt. I" (from "The Plan") [6:36]
7. "Apocalypse, Pt. II" (from "The Plan") [2:35]
8. "Pegasus Aftermath" (from "Razor") [4:09]
9. "Kendra's Memories" (from "Razor") [2:43]
10. "Mayhem on the Colonies" (from "The Plan") [3:28]
11. "Civilian Standoff on the Scylla" (from "Razor") [2:56]
12. "Husker in Combat" (from "Razor") [1:54], contains "Theme from Battlestar Galactica" by Stu Phillips and Glen A. Larson
13. "Major Kendra Shaw" (from "Razor") [5:03]
14. "Cavil Kills and Cavil Spares" (from "The Plan") [2:12], featuring Raya Yarbrough, vocals
15. "The Hybrid Awaits" (from "Razor") [2:43]
16. "Kendra and the Hybrid" (from "Razor") [6:06]
17. "Princes of the Universe" (from "The Plan") [3:56]
18. "Starbuck's Destiny" (from "Razor") [0:39]
19. "Apocalypse" (Theme from "The Plan" / bonus Live Version) [6:24], performed by The Battlestar Galactica Orchestra

=== Blood and Chrome soundtrack ===
A final soundtrack, consisting entirely of music from Blood and Chrome was released on March 3, 2013. The track list is as follows:

1. "Dear Dad" (3:58)
2. "The Galactica" (1:37)
  - Featuring Raya Yarbrough, vocals
  - Contains "Theme from Battlestar Galactica" by Stu Phillips and Glen A. Larson
3. "The Mission Begins" (2:00)
4. "Becca's Past" (2:42)
5. "Archeron" (5:37)
6. "The Ghost Fleet" (2:03)
7. "Coker and Kirby" (1:48)
8. "The Last Battle of the Osiris" (8:39)
9. "Emergency Landing" (1:58)
10. "The Ice Cave" (5:23)
11. "You Will Regret This" (5:38)
12. "Coker's Interlude" (2:50)
  - Performed by Joohyun Park
13. "Ski Lodge Battle" (6:28)
14. "Automated Cylon Transmission Relay" (2:58)
15. "A Cylon Spy" (4:01)
16. "Coker's Photo" (2:32)
17. "Husker" (3:12)
18. "Apocalypse: Blood & Chrome" (4:53)
  - Featuring Raya Yarbrough and Brendan McCreary, vocals
  - Lyrics by Raya Yarbrough; Music by Bear McCreary

== Main title music ==
The main titles of Battlestar Galactica have been set to two distinct pieces of music. For the first season, a different cue was used in North America than for broadcasts taking place in other regions. The North American cue was a modification of the instrumental cue used for Zak Adama's funeral in "Act of Contrition", followed by a segment played on taiko drums that played over a montage of scenes from the upcoming episode. The "worldwide" cue followed the same structure, but with the funeral cue replaced by a vocal rendition of the Gayatri Mantra:

oṃ bhūr bhuvaḥ svaḥ
tát savitúr váren_{i}yaṃ
bhárgo devásya dhīmahi
dhíyo yó naḥ pracodáyāt

A literal translation of the Gayatri verse proper can be given as:

"May we attain that excellent glory of Savitar the god:

So may he stimulate our prayers."

—The Hymns of the Rigveda (1896), Ralph T. H. Griffith

From the second season on, the North American broadcasts used the same Gayatri Mantra title theme as the rest of the world. The North American DVD and Blu-Ray releases have used the theme music that was used for the broadcast of the respective episodes.

== Principal themes ==
=== Colonial theme ===
Usage in "Are You Alive? / Battlestar Galactica Main Title" is related to its frequent interweaving with Number Six's Theme, and Cylon creation by Humans.

- Soundtrack: "Are You Alive? / Battlestar Galactica Main Title", "A Call to Arms", "To Kiss or Not to Kiss", "The Day Comes", "Launch Vipers", "Seal the Bulkheads", "The Lottery Ticket", "Apollo is Gone / Starbuck Returns", "The Storm and the Dead", "Reunited", "Battle" and "Good Night".

=== Adama family theme ===
This theme, usually used for heartfelt moments involving William and/or Lee Adama, uses an uilleann pipe and Irish flute in a heavily Celtic style, with lyrics in Irish Gaelic. Performances range from a full choral arrangement ("The Hand of God", "Home, Part 1") to a more subtle performance on an Irish whistle ("Resistance"). In season 4 the theme is also played on Scottish smallpipes, including a building march entitled "Farewell Apollo" in the episode "Six of One".

- Episodes: "The Hand of God", "Home, Part 1", "Exodus, Part 1", "A Day in the Life", "Six of One", "Daybreak, Part II" – A variation of this theme is also played towards the end of the pilot episode of the spin-off series Caprica.
- Soundtrack: Season 1- "A Good Lighter," "Wander My Friends"; Season 2- "Reuniting the Fleet"; Season 3- "Admiral and Commander"; Season 4- "Farewell Apollo," "Grand Old Lady"

=== Apollo's theme ===
Lee "Apollo" Adama's theme is a slow, sad piece that is rarely heard on the show: McCreary attributes this to the inflexibility of Apollo's theme, as opposed to Starbuck's, which has spawned many variations. In its melancholy form, Apollo's theme underscored the destruction of the Olympic Carrier passenger liner in "33"; and in the revelations of Lee Adama's lost love on Caprica in "Black Market". In a more positive mode, it plays as Apollo prepares to destroy the Cylon tylium mining facility in "The Hand of God". The theme returns in season three's "Taking a Break from All Your Worries", when it plays as a drunken Lee – torn between his wife Dualla and Starbuck – loses his wedding ring and frantically searches for it in one of Galactica's corridors.

- Episodes: "33", "Act of Contrition", "The Hand of God", "Black Market", "Collaborators", "Taking a Break from All Your Worries".
- Soundtrack: Season 1- "The Olympic Carrier," "Battle on the Asteroid." Season 3- "Someone to Trust."

=== Cylon theme ===
The Cylon theme was first introduced when Karl "Helo" Agathon ran from the Cylon centurions in "33", then later throughout the first season as the Cylons pursued Helo and Sharon. Performed on taiko drums and augmented with metallic sounds (including pots, pans and toasters — "toaster" on the show being a pejorative word for "Cylon").

The theme became a general theme for the Cylons and Cylon Raiders in particular, a development that is highly prominent in "Scar".

- Episodes: "33", "Six Degrees of Separation", "The Hand of God", "Flight of the Phoenix", "Scar"

=== Cylon Basestar theme ===
For the sequence of episodes dealing with Gaius Baltar's experiences on a Cylon Basestar, series creator Ronald D. Moore wished to use "unsettlingly familiar classical piano music": his initial idea was to use Ludwig van Beethoven's Piano Sonata No. 14 ("Moonlight" Sonata). Bear McCreary then developed the theme for Baltar's experiences on the Basestar from this starting point, incorporating Baltar's theme into the piano performance.

- Episodes: "Torn", "A Measure of Salvation", "The Passage", "The Eye of Jupiter".
- Soundtrack: Season 3- "Battlestar Sonatica"

=== Laura Roslin's theme ===
Laura Roslin's theme was first introduced in first season finale "Kobol's Last Gleaming" to help underscore the spiritual and mysterious discovery of Kobol. This rendition of the theme was accompanied with Latin lyrics sung by a boy soprano; the lyrics are made up of two of the show's recurring verbal motifs, "All of this has happened before, and all of it will happen again," and "So say we all."

Roslin's theme was set to lyrics a second time for the third season premiere "Occupation", this time in Armenian.

- Episodes: "Kobol's Last Gleaming", "Fragged", "Epiphanies", "Lay Down Your Burdens", "Occupation", "Exodus, Part 1"

Note that there is also the "Roslin and Adama theme", which frequently plays in scenes featuring Laura Roslin.

=== Lee and Kara's love theme ===
Introduced in season three's "Unfinished Business", this piece accompanies the tempestuous affair between pilots Lee Adama and Kara Thrace. A tender rendition of it can be heard in "Maelstrom" as Lee offers support to the increasingly unstable Kara and the two reflect sadly on their troubled relationship. In the third season soundtrack, it features in the tracks "Violence and Variations", where it is interwoven with the Opera House (Passacaglia) theme, and "Under the Wing."

- Episodes: "Unfinished Business", "Maelstrom," "Six of One," "Islanded in a Stream of Stars," "Daybreak: Part 2".

=== Number Six's theme ===
Also known as the "Cylon overlord theme", this simple 9-note motif was composed by Richard Gibbs for the Miniseries. The 9/8 figure is divided unevenly into a group of 3, followed by 3 groups of 2. It is almost always performed on a gamelan. The theme serves as a general theme for Number Six, in particular the copy that "haunts" Gaius Baltar, and plays over the prologue of each episode.

In "Downloaded", when Caprica-Six is similarly haunted by a vision of Gaius Baltar, Number Six's theme is featured, but it has been digitally reversed, signifying the turning of the tables. The reversed Number Six theme has been used for subsequent appearances of Caprica-Six's internal Baltar. Some of the sections of the theme have connections to the Colonial theme, each being a primary theme in the Miniseries, and some parts are frequently interwoven, stemming from both usage in the first track "Are You Alive? / Battlestar Galactica Main Title."

Theme appears in different variations as "Are You Alive? / Battlestar Galactica Main Title", "Goodbye, Baby", "Six Sex", "Deep Sixed", "The Day Comes", "Counterattack", "A Call to Arms", "Seal the Bulkheads", "The Lottery Ticket", "The Storm and The Dead", "The Sense of Six", "Starbuck's Recon", "Good Night", "By Your Command".

- Episodes: Miniseries, each episode's prologue, numerous scenes featuring Number Six

=== Roslin and Adama theme ===
This theme is a simple waltz, inspired by traditional Celtic ballads, and serves as a "love theme" for Laura Roslin and William Adama. Originally composed for the gentle scenes in "Resurrection Ship, Parts 1 & 2", in which William Adama's caring for the dying President Roslin is most apparent, this theme becomes an obvious thematic marker for their subtle relationship. It plays again as Roslin decides to concede the presidential election to Doctor Gaius Baltar in "Lay Down Your Burdens, Part 2".

- Episodes: "Resurrection Ship, Parts 1 & 2"; "Lay Down Your Burdens, Part 2"; "Unfinished Business"; "A Day in the Life"; "Crossroads, Part 2"; "The Hub"; "A Disquiet Follows My Soul"; "Islanded in a Stream of Stars"; "Daybreak, Part 2".
- Soundtrack: "Roslin and Adama"; "Adama Falls"; "Roslin and Adama Reunited"; "Laura Runs"; "So Much Life"

=== Sharon's theme ===
Sharon's theme is sombre and introspective, representative of the inner conflict common to both principal copies of Number Eight (Sharon) featured in the series. This theme is occasionally played in ethnic woodwinds or by a string orchestra, but almost always performed by an ensemble of gamelans and bells.

- Episodes: numerous scenes featuring Number Eight

=== The Shape of Things to Come theme ===
This theme, also referred to as the "Passacaglia", "Allegro", or "Opera House theme", is one of the few recurring motifs in Battlestar Galactica — along with "Worthy of Survival" — not associated with a particular character or group of characters. Appearing in the first season soundtrack as "Passacaglia" after the Spanish and Italian musical form that it follows, the theme was first introduced over the opening montage of episode "Kobol's Last Gleaming, Part 1". In "Kobol's Last Gleaming, Part 2", it plays as Baltar has a vision amid the ruins of the Opera House on Kobol of that structure as it was during Kobol's glory days. He is informed by his internal Number Six that the mysterious infant he sees within — apparently Hera Agathon — is "the first of a new generation of God's children" and "the face of the shape of things to come." The theme also accompanies Number Three's visions of the Final Five set in the Opera House in "Hero", but its usage is not limited to the Opera House setting: in "Home, Part 2", "Pegasus", and "Unfinished Business" it accompanies emotionally resonant scenes that concern the fate of characters or their relationships. In the third season soundtrack, it features in the track "Violence and Variations", where it is interwoven with Lee and Kara's love theme, and "Under the Wing." The final version serves as the outro to "An Easterly View", which plays as Admiral Adama sits next to Laura Roslin's grave in the series finale.

Each major variation of this theme is in a different meter: "Passacaglia" is in 3/4, "The Shape of Things to Come" is in 6/8 and "Allegro" is in 4/4.

- Episodes: "Kobol's Last Gleaming, Parts 1 and 2", "Scattered", "Home, Part 2", "Hero", "Unfinished Business", "Crossroads, Part 2," "Daybreak, Part 2."
- Soundtrack: Season 1- "Passacaglia", "The Shape of Things to Come"

=== Starbuck's themes ===
The character of Lieutenant Kara "Starbuck" Thrace has acquired two distinct themes over the course of the series. The first theme was originally composed for "You Can't Go Home Again", as a triumphant cue for when Starbuck escapes from the red moon on which she was stranded, flying a captured Cylon Raider. It also scored the heart-felt finale when William Adama forgives her for the death of his younger son, Zak Adama.

"I never intended this simple theme to become a signature for Starbuck, but since it played both warm/bitter-sweet and triumphant/exciting in one episode it obviously had potential as a malleable thematic idea. In fact, in "Flesh and Bone", this theme was given a dark variation as Starbuck mercilessly tortured Leoben and her motives for doing so became questionable." — Bear McCreary

- Episodes: "You Can't Go Home Again", "Flesh and Bone", numerous scenes featuring Kara Thrace

A second theme was introduced in the opening episodes of the third season to accompany the love-hate relationship between Leoben and Starbuck. The theme was further developed as a "destiny" cue in "Maelstrom", in which Starbuck, before her own apparent demise, appears to commune with Leoben and her deceased mother.

The cue is always performed on a Chinese erhu or zhonghu, a two-stringed instrument similar to a violin in timbre.

- Episodes: "Occupation", "Precipice", "Exodus, Parts 1 and 2", "Maelstrom", "Razor", "Sometimes A Great Notion".

=== Tigh's theme ===
Tigh's theme is inspired by present-day military hymns, and, along with Kat's theme from "The Passage", represents almost the only use of orchestral brass in the entire score. McCreary "wanted to create a musical idea that would represent both [Tigh's] strength and loyalty, as well as his unpredictable and dangerous nature." Tigh's theme is first stated during Colonel Tigh's declaration of martial law in "Fragged"; it returns during the third season, playing as Tigh is released from prison and over other key character moments for Tigh.

- Episodes: "Fragged", "Final Cut", "Sacrifice", "Occupation", "Precipice", "Torn", "Hero", "Crossroads, Parts 1 and 2", "Razor", "Escape Velocity", "Sometimes a Great Notion".

=== Tyrol's theme ===
Tyrol's theme was first devised as a love theme for Tyrol and Sharon "Boomer" Valerii, but was shelved after its first use because the two characters ended their relationship immediately thereafter. It returned at the end of the second season as a love theme for Tyrol and Cally, and served in that role for the rest of the series. The tune is written in Lydian mode and performed using the bottom register of an alto flute.

- Episodes: "Litmus", "Lay Down Your Burdens, Part 2", "Occupation", "A Day in the Life".

=== Worthy of Survival ===
The "Worthy of Survival" theme was developed as a melancholy variation of the "Prelude to War" cue used to score the combat scenes in "Pegasus" and "Resurrection Ship, Parts 1 and 2".

"While the accompanimental figures come from Prelude, the melody is wholly original to this theme. First stated on a lonely duduk, and then in octaves by the violins and violas, it is a melancholy and contemplative tune." — Bear McCreary

Taking its title from a line of dialogue in "Resurrection Ship, Part 2", the theme was intended to play as Starbuck prepares to assassinate Admiral Helena Cain, but only a small fragment was used in the final cut of the episode. McCreary re-worked the theme for the second season finale, "Lay Down Your Burdens, Part 2", and a bolder statement of the theme played over the Cylons' occupation of planet New Caprica. "Worthy of Survival" returned in its most tragic and melancholy statement as the cue playing over Saul Tigh's uxoricide of Ellen Tigh.

- Episodes: "Resurrection Ship, Part 2", "Lay Down Your Burdens, Part 2", "Exodus, Part 2", "Daybreak, Part 2".

== Original series homage ==
During Baltar's television introduction and the museum dedication scene in the miniseries, the "Colonial Anthem" is played in the background. The anthem is actually the main theme music of the original Battlestar Galactica series, originally composed by Stu Phillips. The anthem is heard again as background music in D'Anna Biers' documentary in the episode "Final Cut." The theme was used again in "Razor", in the flashback in which the young William Adama is fighting over the Cylon planet, although it is not the same rhythmic meter. The theme is again used in "Daybreak, Part II", heard at several junctions in the show, including when Adama flies the last Viper off the Galactica and when Anders flies the fleet into the sun. The theme plays again in "Blood & Chrome", when Adama arrives at the Colonial Fleet and sees the Galactica for the first time.

In the episode "Someone to Watch Over Me", the piano player riffs on a theme which Starbuck identifies as the second movement of Nomian's 3rd Sonata; the theme is Stu Phillips' "Exploration", the trumpet fanfare from the prelude to the original theme. The prelude fanfare is also heard during the ceremonial squadron flyby in the first part of the miniseries.

In the prequel show Caprica, the original theme is heard relatively unaltered before the beginning of a professional Pyramid game, giving the impression that it is the national anthem of either the Colony of Caprica or, given that Caprica is the capital of the Colonies, the Twelve Colonies as a whole.

== Music not original to Battlestar Galactica ==
On occasion, Battlestar Galactica features music that was not composed specifically for the series.

=== Cavatina ===
The second-season episode "Scar" closes with Stanley Myers' classical guitar piece "Cavatina", most famous as the theme from the 1978 film The Deer Hunter.

=== Metamorphosis ===
The second-season episode "Valley of Darkness" features "Metamorphosis One" by Philip Glass. While the piece cannot be found on the show's second season soundtrack album, the original recording may be found on Glass' 1989 album Solo Piano as part of Glass' Post Minimalism work. The piece is played in Kara Thrace's apartment on Caprica (it is explained that her father is the fictional pianist) and plays over Lee Adama and Saul Tigh's conversation at William Adama's bedside at the end of the episode. It is one of the few pieces of music in the remade Battlestar Galactica that is both diegetic and extradiegetic.

=== All Along the Watchtower ===
An arrangement of Bob Dylan's "All Along the Watchtower" features prominently in the third season track "A Distant Sadness", and specially the season finale episodes "Crossroads, Parts 1 and 2", in the tracks "Heeding the Call", and the penultimate "All Along the Watchtower". McCreary's arrangement utilizes the electric sitar, harmonium, duduk, fretless bass, yaylı tambur, electric violin and zurna, and features McCreary's brother Brendan "Bt4" McCreary and former Oingo Boingo guitarist Steve Bartek.

The song haunts the characters Saul Tigh, Galen Tyrol, Samuel Anders, and Tory Foster throughout the two parts of "Crossroads" and plays over the final scenes of "Crossroads, Part 2": like "Metamorphosis One", it is one of the few pieces of music in the remade Battlestar Galactica that is both diegetic and non-diegetic.

Variations of the theme can also be heard by Saul Tigh in "He That Believeth In Me", the four of the final cylons revealed thus far in "Revelations", and Samuel Anders (who remembers playing the song on guitar) in "Sometimes A Great Notion" . A piano version of the tune entitled "Kara Remembers" can also be heard in the episode "Someone to Watch Over Me". The most famous version of the song, recorded by Jimi Hendrix, plays at the very end of "Daybreak, Part 3", making it the last song played in the series.

Incidentally, in season 4 episode 18, Baltar proclaims "death is not the end" at the funeral. This is also a Dylan song with lyrics that are thematic to the storyline.

== Reception ==
Alan Sepinwall of The Star-Ledger states that Bear McCreary on Battlestar Galactica as well as Lost's Michael Giacchino do "transcendent work in an area [composing for television] that's too often underappreciated." The Chicago Tribune's Maureen Ryan praises McCreary's work on the series as "sensational" and "innovative." Cinefantastique finds it "richly textural" and "drawing deeply from ethnic and world beat music." Joanna Weiss of The Boston Globe states that "visionary composer Bear McCreary... did much to create the rich atmosphere of Battlestar." Variety says: "Galactica offers some of the most innovative music on TV today." SoundtrackNet gave the fourth season soundtrack five stars, saying "This album is a must-have for any soundtrack collector."

On the 2009 Primetime Emmy Awards Battlestar Galactica's "Prelude to War" was used in a segment showcasing "the Year in Drama".

== Live performances ==
There have been several live concerts featuring the music of both Battlestar Galactica and Caprica. In April 2008, more than 1,000 fans attended two sold-out shows at L.A.'s Roxy on Sunset Boulevard, with some fans flying in from as far as Britain and Australia. A ballet based on McCreary's scores for Galactica premiered on March 7, 2009 for a 13-week run. Entitled "Prelude to War", it was performed by the dancers of the Theaterhagen in Hagen, Germany with choreography by Ricardo Fernando, and the Hagen Philharmonic Orchestra conducted by Bernhard Steiner.

Officially known as The Battlestar Galactica Orchestra and directed by Bear McCreary, the group performed three concerts in late July 2009 at the House of Blues in San Diego. Edward James Olmos (Admiral Adama) and Grace Park (Boomer/Athena) made appearances. Earlier in a live performance on June 13, 2009, McCreary was joined onstage at the piano by Katee Sackhoff performing the intro to "All Along the Watchtower" as a reenactment of the scene in "Someone to Watch Over Me". According to McCreary's blog, a future international tour and a possible concert CD and DVD is currently in the works. In June 2021, McCreary released the album, So Say We All: Battlestar Galactica Live, consisting of live concert arrangements of 13 pieces of music from the TV series.

== See also ==
- Music of Caprica
- Pavamana Mantra (used in 'To Kiss Or Not To Kiss')
