= Revelations (Battlestar Galactica) =

- Battlestar Galactica episode
- Episode no.: Season 4 Episode 10
- Directed by: Michael Rymer
- Written by: Bradley Thompson; David Weddle
- Original air date: June 13, 2008

Episode chronology
| ← Previous "The Hub" | Next → "Sometimes a Great Notion" |
- Battlestar Galactica season 4

"Revelations" is the tenth episode in the fourth season of the reimagined Battlestar Galactica. It first aired on television in the United States on June 13, 2008. The episode serves as the mid-season finale of the fourth season, with the concluding episodes of the series airing after a hiatus. The survivor count shown in the title sequence is 39,665.

== Plot ==
The Cylons, led by D'Anna Biers (Lucy Lawless), decide to take Laura Roslin (Mary McDonnell) and the Colonial soldiers aboard the Basestar hostage to bargain for the secretive "Final Five" Cylons currently on the Battlestar Galactica. Before the departure of Admiral William Adama (Edward James Olmos) from the Basestar, President Roslin secretly orders him to attack and destroy the Basestar in the event that negotiations between the Cylons and Humans go poorly, for if they have the five they'll have Earth and he can't allow that eventuality. D'Anna asks initially that the four can leave at their own will, but after Tory Foster (Rekha Sharma) joins them (at first only under the guise that Laura needs her medication and she being her assistant, is obliged to do so). When the other Cylons refuse to disclose themselves and voluntarily go with her, D'Anna reneges and starts to order the execution of her hostages until "her people come home". Adama subsequently passes along Roslin's order to his son and acting President Lee Adama (Jamie Bamber), who reluctantly agrees.

After Tory's defection, Colonel Saul Tigh (Michael Hogan) admits to his friend and commanding officer that he too is a Cylon in order to prevent what he sees as useless slaughter. Tigh even offers himself up to be airlocked as a bargaining chip. Horrified, Adama orders Tigh to be arrested. As Tigh is escorted away, Adama tears apart his office in a fit of rage and despair. Lee uses Tigh's life, as well as those of fellow Cylons Samuel Anders (Michael Trucco) and Galen Tyrol (Aaron Douglas), as leverage, but D'Anna refuses, at one point arming the Basestar's nuclear weapons. Gaius Baltar (James Callis), also a hostage, tries to reason with D'Anna.

At Anders and Tyrol's request (who were drawn back to Kara's viper), Kara "Starbuck" Thrace re-inspects the Viper fighter she was piloting in the third-season finale "Crossroads", and discovers a hidden signal being received by the fighter (the same signal that activated the five previously). She halts the execution of Tigh, and explains to the Galactica's crew that she presumes the signal originates from Earth. Though everyone agrees that it is unlikely, D'Anna and Lee form an alliance to find Earth.

In the final scene of the episode, the Fleet jubilantly arrives at Earth. Adama announces to the Fleet that their journey is finally over. A party of humans and Cylons travel down to the surface. Landing in the ruins of a large city, they are left speechless when they find Earth to be a desolate, radioactive, lifeless world.

== Production ==
The scene on Earth was shot on Centennial Beach in Tsawwassen, British Columbia.

For the arrival at Earth, Bear McCreary composed a piece he titled "Diaspora Oratorio." He also wrote the lyrics which were then translated into Latin for one scene and Samoan for another.

== Reception ==
Joanna Weiss of the Boston Globe called it "one of the most tense, well-executed episodes [she] can remember," praising the acting of Callis and Olmos in their respective keynote scenes. The New York Times praised the episode as "stunning," and declared that "the finale—especially the ominous final scene—is getting far more attention than its rating would indicate." James Hibberd of The Hollywood Reporter said, "The show, which has been uneven this season, snapped together in its last hour for an Emmy-worthy cliffhanger."

Alan Sepinwall of The Star-Ledger called it "one of the busiest and yet most emotional hours of Galactica ever." Robin Brownfield of SyFy Portal praised the episode overall, but found the trip to Earth to be anticlimactic: "I know the sudden change of venue was necessary to move the story along, but it seemed a bit too rushed.". The Chicago Tribune's Maureen Ryan found that the episode "brilliantly reinforced the main themes of the series" and "the final scene, with its masterful tracking shot of all the characters reacting to the devastation around them, was one of the best moments in the entire series."

In March 2009, the episode was nominated for a 2009 Hugo Award in the Best Dramatic Presentation, Short Form category.

=== Ratings ===
The mid-season finale of Battlestar Galactica was watched by 1.8 million total viewers for a 1.4 household rating; the largest audience for an episode of the show since the Season 4 premiere. Of that total, 1.2 million viewers were in the coveted 18-to-49-year-old demographic.

These ratings do not include viewers who watch the show on DVRs. One source estimated that fewer than 500,000 additional viewers watch Battlestar Galactica on DVR. The Nielsen ratings estimate for DVR watching (calculated over the seven days following an episode's initial airing) do not count shows watched on delay by fewer than 500,000 viewers, and Battlestar Galactica does not usually appear in the Nielsen DVR ratings.
