= Sine qua non (disambiguation) =

Sine qua non is a Latin phrase that refers to indispensable and essential action, condition, or ingredient.

Sine qua non may also refer to:

- "Sine Qua Non" (Battlestar Galactica), an episode of the sci-fi TV series Battlestar Galactica
- Sine Qua Non (wine), a California cult wine producer
- "Sinequanon", a song by Hybrid appearing on the 1999 album Wide Angle
