= Pavamana Mantra =

Hindu mantra introduced in the Bṛhadāraṇyaka Upaniṣad

The Pāvamāna Mantra (pāvamāna meaning "being purified, strained", historically a name of Soma), also known as pāvamāna abhyāroha (abhyāroha, lit. "ascending", being an Upanishadic technical term for "prayer") is an ancient Sanskrit mantra found in the Bṛhadāraṇyaka Upaniṣad, part of the Yajur Veda.

== Text and translation ==
The text of the mantra reads:

असतो मा सद्गमय ।
तमसो मा ज्योतिर्गमय ।
मृत्योर्माऽमृतं गमय ॥

asato mā sadgamaya,
tamaso mā jyotirgamaya,
mṛtyormā'mṛtaṃ gamaya.

Swami Madhavananda offers the following translation:

From evil lead me to good,
From darkness lead me to light,
From death lead me to immortality.

Patrick Olivelle offers a slightly different translation:

From the unreal lead me to the real!
From the darkness lead me to the light!
From death lead me to immortality!

The more common modern translation differs slightly in the translation of the first line:

From falsehood lead me to truth,
From darkness lead me to light,
From death lead me to immortality.

These three statements are referred to as the three Pavamana Mantras. Some renderings – generally modern – add Omॐ (oṃ) at the beginning and/or ॐ शान्तिः शान्तिः शान्तिः ॥ (oṃ śāntiḥ śāntiḥ śāntiḥ, 'om peace peace peace') as a fourth line. This is a stylistic addition that concludes a recitation; as such it is often included with the verse. The Upanishad itself does not end the line that way.

== Sanskrit word meaning ==
- asataḥ – "from falsehood"; ablative case of asat "falsehood", from a (negation) + sat "truth"; becomes asato due to sandhi; can be a synonym for "evil"
- mā – "me"; first person pronoun, singular number, accusative case
- sat – "to truth"; accusative case of sat "truth"; here accusative case shows the destination; becomes sad due to sandhi; can be a synonym for "good"
- gamaya – "lead"; causative, imperative mood, active voice, singular number, second person of root gam "to go".
- tamasaḥ – "from darkness"; ablative case of tamas "darkness"; becomes tamaso due to sandhi
- jyotiḥ – "to light"; accusative case of jyotis "light"; becomes jyotir due to sandhi
- mṛtyoḥ – "from death"; ablative case of mṛtyu "death"; becomes mṛtyor due to sandhi
- amṛtaṃ – "to immortality"; accusative case of amṛta "immortal", literally "not dead", from a (negation) + mṛta "dead"; becomes 'mṛtaṃ due to vowel elision.

The Sanskrit term sat, which means "truth" or "what is existing, real", has a range of important religious meanings including "truth" or "the Absolute, Brahman". The passage immediately following the mantra explicitly identifies the unreal and darkness with death and the real and light with immortality, saying that all three portions of the mantra have the same meaning of "Make me immortal." In the interpretation of Swami Krishnananda (1977), "From the nonexistent, from the unreal, from the apparent, lead me to the other side of it, the Existent, the Real, the Noumenon." According to this interpretation and in keeping with the philosophy of Vedanta, the text rejects the material world as "unreal", "dark" and "dead" and invokes a concept of the transcendental reality.

== Usage in culture ==
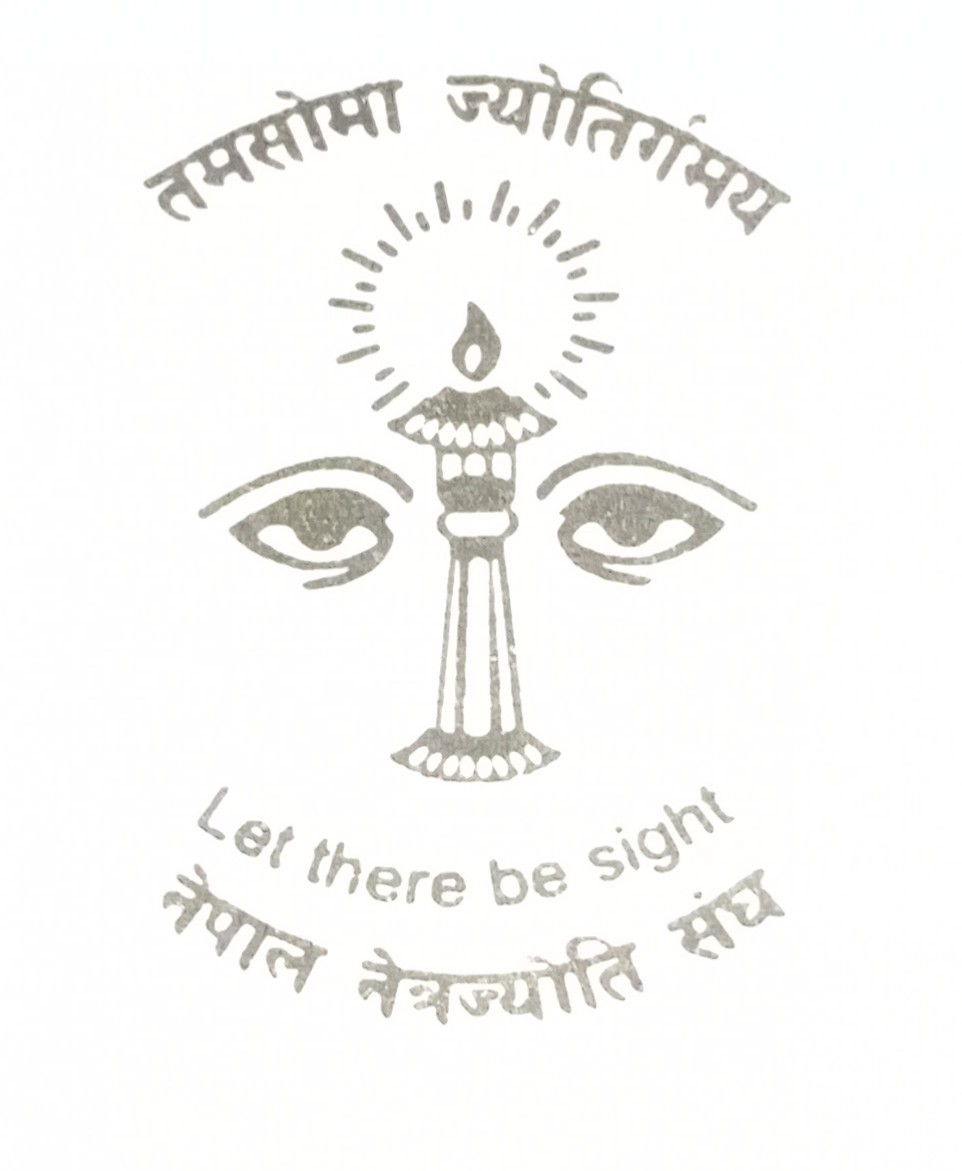
Nepal Netra Jyoti Sangh "तमसोमा ज्योतिर्गमय"।

The quote has been used as an opening statement for the Economic Survey 2021 by Krishnamurthy Subramanian, who reports to the finance minister under the Narendra Modi Government.

In 1997, it was musically arranged by Ravi Shankar and George Harrison, and included in the album Chants of India.

In 1976, the mantra was used for the lyrics for "Gita", a song by John McLaughlin's Mahavishnu Orchestra, from their album Inner Worlds.

In 2003, the mantra was worked into two pieces of the score for The Matrix Revolutions, Neodämmerung by Don Davis and Navras by Juno Reactor and used in the final battle scene and end credits of the film, respectively.

The mantra features in 'To Kiss or Not to Kiss' in the soundtrack of Battlestar Galactica (2004 TV series).

The text of the mantra (albeit with some typography issues and/or typos) is quoted in the beginning of the official music video for Light of Transcendence, the first track on the 2018 album Ømni by the Brazilian power metal band Angra.

In 2024, the mantra was used in the lyrics for "Shanti", a song by Zedd from the album Telos.

In the 2025 film Dhurandhar, the mantra soundtracks a hallucinatory vision of the deceased character Rehman Dakait, experienced by the film's protagonist Hamza.
