= Battlestar Galactica season 3 =

Battlestar Galactica
- Season 3
- Season Three DVD cover
- No. of episodes: 20

Release
- Original network: Sci Fi
- Original release: October 6, 2006 – March 25, 2007

Season chronology
- ← Previous; Season 2 Next → Season 4

The third season of the reimagined science fiction television series Battlestar Galactica premiered on Sci Fi in the United States on October 6, 2006, and concluded on March 25, 2007. Unlike the previous season, it was not split into two parts and did not have an extended hiatus during the middle of the season. The third season contained 20 episodes.

== Cast and characters ==
=== Main cast ===
These actors are credited during the opening sequence:

- Edward James Olmos as William Adama
- Mary McDonnell as Laura Roslin
- Katee Sackhoff as Kara "Starbuck" Thrace
- Jamie Bamber as Lee "Apollo" Adama
- James Callis as Gaius Baltar
- Tricia Helfer as Number Six
- Grace Park as Sharon "Boomer" Valerii / Sharon "Athena" Agathon / Number Eight

These actors are credited after the opening sequence:

- Michael Hogan as Saul Tigh
- Aaron Douglas as Galen Tyrol
- Tahmoh Penikett as Karl "Helo" Agathon
- Nicki Clyne as Cally Henderson Tyrol
- Alessandro Juliani as Felix Gaeta
- Kandyse McClure as Anastasia Dualla

=== Recurring ===
- Lucy Lawless as D'Anna Biers / Number Three
- Michael Trucco as Samuel Anders
- Callum Keith Rennie as Leoben Conoy / Number Two
- Kate Vernon as Ellen Tigh
- Matthew Bennett as Aaron Doral / Number Five
- Rekha Sharma as Tory Foster
- Dean Stockwell as John Cavil / Number One
- Richard Hatch as Tom Zarek
- Rick Worthy as Simon / Number Four
- Donnelly Rhodes as Sherman Cottle
- Mark Sheppard as Romo Lampkin
- Chelah Horsdal as Didi Cassidy
- Brad Dryborough as Hoshi
- Leah Cairns as Margaret "Racetrack" Edmondson
- Madeline Parker as Kacey
- Dominic Zamprogna as Jammer
- Colin Lawrence as Hamish "Skulls" McCall
- Eileen Pedde as Sgt. Erin Mathias
- Jennifer Halley as Diana "Hardball" Seelix
- Ryan Robbins as Charlie Connor
- Bodie Olmos as Brendan "Hot Dog" Costanza
- Tiffany Lyndall-Knight as Hybrid
- Don Thompson as Figurski
- Christian Tessier as Tucker "Duck" Clellan
- Erica Cerra as Maya
- Ty Olsson as Captain Aaron Kelly
- Emilie Ullerup as Julia
- Alisen Down as Jean Barolay
- Diego Diablo Del Mar as Hillard
- Aleks Paunovic as Marine Sgt. Omar Fischer
- Tygh Runyan as Private Sykes
- Alison Matthews as Karen Fallbrook
- Susan Hogan as Doyle Franks

=== Guest ===
- Amanda Plummer as Oracle Selloi
- Carl Lumbly as Danny "Bulldog" Novacek
- Luciana Carro as Louanne "Kat" Katraine
- Kerry Norton as Paramedic Laybe Ishay
- Bruce Davison as Dr. Michael Robert
- Lucinda Jenney as Carolanne Adama
- David Patrick Green as Xeno Fenner
- Dorothy Lyman as Socrata Thrace
- Sebastian Spence as Noel "Narcho" Allison

== Episodes ==
No. overall	No. in season	Title	Survivor count	Directed by	Written by	Original release date
34	1	"Occupation"	Unspecified	Sergio Mimica-Gezzan	Ronald D. Moore	October 6, 2006
Four months into the Cylon occupation of New Caprica, the resistance continues to attack both Cylons and collaborators. Meanwhile, Adama and Apollo argue over the plan to rescue the colonists.
35	2	"Precipice"	Unspecified	Sergio Mimica-Gezzan	Ronald D. Moore	October 6, 2006
The morality of suicide bombings is debated among the resistance leaders as the Cylons enact harsh measures on the civilian population in an effort to quell the growing insurgency.
36	3	"Exodus (Part 1)"	Unspecified	Félix Enríquez Alcalá	Bradley Thompson & David Weddle	October 13, 2006
Both the resistance fighters on New Caprica and those within the fleet make final preparations for the evacuation of the planet, while Number Three has strange dreams which lead her to a human oracle.
37	4	"Exodus (Part 2)"	Unspecified	Félix Enríquez Alcalá	Bradley Thompson & David Weddle	October 20, 2006
With the return of the Galactica, the insurgents on New Caprica begin an all-out uprising in an attempt to evacuate the stranded colonists.
38	5	"Collaborators"	41,435	Michael Rymer	Mark Verheiden	October 27, 2006
The Circle, a secret tribunal onboard Galactica, decides the fate of Colonials who collaborated with the Cylons during the occupation of New Caprica.
39	6	"Torn"	41,422	Jean de Segonzac	Anne Cofell Saunders	November 3, 2006
As Starbuck and Tigh seed discontent among Galactica's crew, Baltar attempts to help the Cylons deal with a virus spreading among their race.
40	7	"A Measure of Salvation"	41,420	Bill Eagles	Michael Angeli	November 10, 2006
With the discovery of a dying Cylon Basestar, Adama and Roslin debate the morality of deploying a biological weapon against the Cylons with the intention of eradicating them.
41	8	"Hero"	41,421	Michael Rymer	David Eick	November 17, 2006
Adama confronts one of the darkest moments of his career when "Bulldog" Novacek, a pilot who was thought to have died years ago during a secret mission, escapes the Cylons and arrives on Galactica.
42	9	"Unfinished Business"	41,422	Robert Young	Michael Taylor	December 1, 2006
In order to ease tensions among the crew, Galactica holds boxing matches between various crew members, while flashbacks detail Apollo and Starbuck's falling out on New Caprica.
43	10	"The Passage"	41,420	Michael Nankin	Jane Espenson	December 8, 2006
When the fleet's food supply is contaminated, Galactica's pilots must lead the ships through a hazardous star cluster. Meanwhile, Kat must suddenly confront a dark secret from her past.
44	11	"The Eye of Jupiter"	41,402	Michael Rymer	Mark Verheiden	December 15, 2006
While collecting algae on a barren planet to use as food, Tyrol discovers the Temple of Five, built by the thirteenth tribe. However, a tense standoff ensues when the Cylons arrive looking for the temple.
45	12	"Rapture"	41,401	Michael Rymer	Bradley Thompson & David Weddle	January 21, 2007
The human-Cylon standoff over the mysterious Eye of Jupiter has reached a breaking point. On the algae planet, D'Anna, Baltar, Brother Cavil, and a team of Centurions prepare to assault the Temple of Five, where the Eye supposedly lies hidden. Meanwhile Athena takes action to retrieve her daughter Hera.
46	13	"Taking a Break from All Your Worries"	41,403	Edward James Olmos	Michael Taylor	January 28, 2007
Baltar is interrogated aboard Galactica, while a makeshift bar called "Joe's" in the hangar deck becomes popular and the relationship problems of Apollo, Dualla, Starbuck and Anders unfold.
47	14	"The Woman King"	41,401	Michael Rymer	Michael Angeli	February 11, 2007
Helo investigates a doctor tending to civilian refugees that may be harming Sagittaron patients.
48	15	"A Day in the Life"	41,398	Rod Hardy	Mark Verheiden	February 18, 2007
Cally and Tyrol are trapped in an area with a dangerous hull breach; Adama struggles with troubling memories of his wife on their anniversary.
49	16	"Dirty Hands"	41,400	Wayne Rose	Jane Espenson & Anne Cofell Saunders	February 25, 2007
After an accident nearly kills President Roslin, Tyrol defies Adama to demand safer working conditions throughout the fleet - and makes himself the rallying point for a strike.
50	17	"Maelstrom"	41,400	Michael Nankin	Bradley Thompson & David Weddle	March 4, 2007
Starbuck's past comes back to haunt her when Adama has doubts about her fitness for duty.
51	18	"The Son Also Rises"	41,399	Robert Young	Michael Angeli	March 11, 2007
When Baltar's representatives face assassination attempts, Adama asks Apollo to protect Baltar's lawyer.
52	19	"Crossroads (Part 1)"	Unspecified	Michael Rymer	Michael Taylor	March 18, 2007
Tensions mount as Baltar's trial begins. Caprica Six stirs memories of Colonel Tigh's wife.
53	20	"Crossroads (Part 2)"	Unspecified	Michael Rymer	Mark Verheiden	March 25, 2007
Gaius Baltar's trial concludes. The fleet jumps into the Ionian nebula, and four of the final five Cylons discover their own true identities.

== Production ==
The Sci-Fi Channel ordered a 20-episode third season on November 16, 2005, with production beginning in April 2006 in Vancouver, British Columbia. The season premiered in the United States on October 6, 2006, in Canada the following day, and in the UK on January 9, 2007; with the first two episodes being shown together. The broadcast schedule for season three did not include a long hiatus in the middle of the season, as with season two. The Sci-Fi Channel moved the series to Sundays on January 21, 2007, the first time the show had changed nights since it began airing.

== Reception ==
=== Critical response ===
The season received universal acclaim from critics, scoring 94 out of 100 based on 14 reviews from Metacritic. On Rotten Tomatoes, the season has an approval rating of 100% with an average score of 9 out of 10 based on 20 reviews. The website's critical consensus reads, "Dark, charming and unusually thoughtful, Battlestar Galactica's third season continues to improve on the show's most addictive elements."

The series also placed on numerous critics top ten lists of both 2006 and 2007 by publications such as the Chicago Tribune, Entertainment Weekly, Newsday, The New York Times and TV Guide.

=== Accolades ===
The third season received four Emmy Award nominations: Outstanding Writing for a Drama Series (Ronald D. Moore for "Occupation / Precipice"), Outstanding Directing for a Drama Series (Félix Enríquez Alcalá for "Exodus, Part 2"), Outstanding Sound Editing for a Series ("Exodus, Part 2"), and won for Outstanding Special Visual Effects for a Series for "Exodus, Part 2", the series' first Emmy win. Ronald D. Moore was also nominated for a Writers Guild of America Award for Episodic Drama for "Occupation / Precipice".

== Home video releases ==
The third season was released on DVD in region 1 on March 18, 2008, in region 2 on September 3, 2007 and in region 4 on November 20, 2007. It was also released on Blu-ray Disc in region 1 on July 27, 2010.

The sets include all 20 episodes from the third season, plus an extended 25-minute longer version of "Unfinished Business". Special features include creator Ronald D. Moore's podcast commentaries for all 20 episodes. Actors Grace Park and Tahmoh Penikett join Moore for his podcast commentary on "Unfinished Business", and Moore's wife Terry Dresbach appears frequently throughout the podcasts as well. Moore also provides a new commentary track for the extended version of "Unfinished Business". Executive producer and writer David Eick provides commentary for "Hero". Bonus podcasts for the final three episodes are also included—writer Michael Angeli and actor Mark Sheppard on "The Son Also Rises" and Sheppard himself on both parts of "Crossroads". Also included is the ten-part webisode series Battlestar Galactica: The Resistance, deleted scenes for various episodes, and 22 of David Eick's videoblogs.
