= Music of Caprica =

The music of Caprica is a body of work credited to composer Bear McCreary.

== Background ==
Bear McCreary, the composer for parent series Battlestar Galactica, has been tasked to compose for the new series. Despite his critically acclaimed work on Battlestar, McCreary was not initially considered for Caprica. The producers preferred a completely new direction in order to emphasize the program as separate from its predecessor, however, they changed their minds after he showed that he could deliver something different. McCreary says: "It needed to be more intimate, more familiar, more classical, and pull away from the raw tribal energy that was in Battlestar". However, some elements of the Battlestar score are used to hint at the future, sparingly at first with the potential to evolve further in that direction in future seasons, including the Adama family theme and the Colonial Anthem.

McCreary's work on Caprica is almost entirely orchestral. As on Battlestar Galactica, character themes are used extensively, however, world ethnic influences play a much smaller role. The full ethnic percussion ensemble, including taikos, frame drums, dumbeks, chang changs, tsuzumis and other instruments, was brought in, although used much more sparingly than on Battlestar. The Tauron Theme draws inspiration from Russian folk music. In the episode "End of Line", the soundtrack prominently features an opera composed for the show by McCreary and sung by Alessandro Juliani, who played Felix Gaeta in Battlestar Galactica.

The second episode of Caprica borrows music from another Bear McCreary composition, the Terminator: The Sarah Connor Chronicles soundtrack. "Atomic Al's Merry Melody" is playing in the background when Lacy visits the home of Sister Clarice Willow.

== Soundtrack releases ==
=== Pilot soundtrack ===
The soundtrack for the extended pilot episode was released on June 16, 2009, by La-La Land Records.

1. "The Graystone Family"
2. "Terrorism on the Lev"
3. "Grieving"
4. "Lacey and Zoe-A"
5. "Cybernetic Life Form Node"
6. "Zoe's Avatar"
7. "Daniel Captures the Code"
8. "A Tauron Sacrifice"
9. "Amanda Graystone"
10. "Joseph and Daniel"
11. "Tamara's Heartbeat"
12. "Delivering the Message"
13. "Monotheism at the Athena Academy"
14. "Children of Caprica"
15. "Irrecoverable Error"
16. "The Adama Name"
17. "Zoe Awakens"
18. "Caprica End Credits"

=== Expanded Soundtrack ===
On July 30, 2013, La-La Land Records released an expanded soundtrack featuring a selection of music from across the first (and only) season of the show. The album is not meant to collect all of the music from the season, but rather a range of the diverse score. It includes many of the cinematic tracks, but also a national anthem, a gangster rap, a drag queen burlesque, and an opera.

Disc 1

1. Caprica Main Title
2. Caprica Abides (Music by Bear McCreary, Lyrics by Jane Espenson, featuring Steve Amerson, vocals) - From the Episodes: "Rebirth" and "Apotheosis"
3. Apotheosis - From the Episode: "Apotheosis"
4. All of This Has Happened (Music and Lyrics by Brendan McCreary, performed by Young Beautiful in a Hurry) - From the Episode: "The Imperfections of Memory"
5. New Cap City - From the Episode: "There Is Another Sky"
6. Lacey and the Cylon- From the Episode: "Rebirth"
7. Vergis' Dream - From the Episode: "Know Thy Enemy"
8. Pact of Brothers - From the Episode: "Dirteaters"
9. Grieving (Alternate Version) - From the Episode: Pilot
10. Control and Power - From the Episode: "Rebirth"
11. Caprica Buccaneers Theme - From the Episode: "Rebirth"
12. Burlesque (Remixed by Jonathan Snipes) - From the Episode: "Ghosts in the Machine"
13. Amanda's Forgiveness - From the Episode: "False Labor"
14. Barnabus - From the Episode: "Retribution"
15. Cerberus Dance (Demo) - From the Episode: "Ghosts in the Machine"
16. Through the Paces - From the Episode: "Ghosts in the Machine"
17. Lacey's Test - From the Episode: "Blowback"
18. Clarice Willow - From the Episodes: "Rebirth," "Reins of a Waterfall" and "Gravedancing"
19. Tauron Ceremony Song (Piano Sketch) - From the Episode: "There Is Another Sky"
20. Lacey and Zoe (Expanded Version) - From the Episode: Pilot
21. Capricoperatica (Music by Bear McCreary, Lyrics by Laura Kalpakian, Featuring Elissa Johnston and Alessandro Juliani, vocals) - From the Episode: "End of Line"

Disc 2

1. Caprica Abides (Instrumental Version) - From the Episodes: "Rebirth" and "Apotheosis"
2. The Differently Sentient - From the Episode: "Apotheosis"
3. Amanda's Epiphany - From the Episode: "Rebirth"
4. Rites of Passage - From the Episode: "There Is Another Sky"
5. New Cap City Theme (Demo)
6. Voices of the Dead (Featuring Brendan McCreary, vocals) - From the Episode: "Reins of a Waterfall"
7. The Dive Bar - From the Episode: "Rebirth"
8. The Cylon Whisperer - From the Episode: "The Heavens Will Rise" and "Here Be Dragons"
9. Daniel Captures the Code (Expanded Version) - From the Episode: Pilot
10. Dirteaters - From the Episode: "Dirteaters"
11. Healing Wounds - From the Episode: "Reins of a Waterfall"
12. Gemenon - From the Episode: "Unvanquished"
13. I Am a Man (Music and Lyrics by Brendan McCreary, Performed by Young Beautiful in a Hurry) - From the Episode: "Gravedancing"
14. Was Love (Music and Lyrics by Jonathan Snipes, Performed by Captain Ahab) - From the Episode: "Gravedancing"
15. Tamara Kills - From the Episode: "There Is Another Sky"
16. Here Be Dragons - From the Episode: "Here Be Dragons"
17. A Tauron Sacrifice (Expanded Version) - From the Episode: Pilot
18. Waltz for Zoe - From the Episode: "Unvanquished"
19. Death of the Guatrau - From the Episode: "Apotheosis"
20. Tauron Ceremony Song (Featuring Raya Yarbrough, vocals) - From the Episode: "There Is Another Sky"
21. Graystone Plays Nomion Variations (Includes "Exploration" by Stu Phillips) - From the Episode: "Rebirth"
22. Caprica Theme (Sketch)

== Reception ==
Film Music Magazine gave the Caprica pilot soundtrack an "A", saying: "McCreary powerfully establishes his prequel main theme off the bat with a distinct, and haunting sense of melancholy for strings and violin, until his biggest statement is made for the end titles. It's striking orchestral composing that shows just how good McCreary has gotten at this stuff".

== See also ==
- Music of Battlestar Galactica (reimagined)
