= The Hub (Battlestar Galactica) =

- Battlestar Galactica episode
- Episode no.: Season 4 Episode 9
- Directed by: Paul Edwards
- Written by: Jane Espenson
- Original air date: June 6, 2008

Episode chronology
← Previous "Sine Qua Non"	Next → "Revelations"
- Battlestar Galactica season 4

"The Hub" is the ninth episode in the fourth season of the re-imagined Battlestar Galactica TV series. It first aired on television in the United States on June 6, 2008.

== Plot ==
After their unexpected jump away from Galactica, the Rebel Cylons determine that the Hybrid panicked after sensing that the Number Six known as Natalie had been shot by Athena. However, the Hybrid is taking the rebel Basestar to the Cylon Resurrection Hub, giving the joint strike force the opportunity to complete their mission. Privately, Roslin orders Helo to bring D'Anna to her alone, much to Helo's discomfort. During this time, Helo befriends an Eight who reveals that she had downloaded his wife's memories from her resurrection at the algae planet.

At the Hub, Cavil and Boomer unbox D'Anna themselves in an attempt to get her to convince the rebels to stand down. Instead, D'Anna kills Cavil after threatening to expose the identities of the Final Five to everyone. Simultaneously, Roslin learns of D'Anna's resurrection from the Hybrid and informs Helo who surmises this development will make the mission easier for them.

Upon arrival at the Hub, the rebels and Colonial pilots launch a joint strike with Cylon Heavy Raiders towing into battle powerless Raptors and Vipers. The surprise attack quickly disables the Hub's FTL drive and allows Helo and the Eight to board and rescue D'Anna. During the battle, a pilot panics and jumps back to Galactica after his Raptor is badly damaged. Once Helo, Eight and D'Anna are clear, the Vipers launch nuclear missiles at the Resurrection Hub, destroying it and at least one of the defending Basestars. With the Hub destroyed, all Cylons lose the ability to resurrect, effectively making them mortal.

Throughout these events, Roslin attempts to get answers from the Hybrid about her mysterious message to Kara Thrace and experiences a series of visions of her friend the priestess Elosha during each FTL jump. Elosha shows Roslin visions of her death from cancer aboard Galactica and tries to teach Roslin to accept her love for Admiral Adama. After Baltar is badly wounded by shrapnel from the battle, he confesses to Roslin his role in the destruction of the Twelve Colonies. Roslin nearly lets him die as a result before finally relenting thanks to her visions of Elosha.

Once clear of the battle, D'Anna jokes that Roslin is one of the Final Five before refusing to reveal their identities until her safety is guaranteed as she is now the last Number Three Cylon. Returning to the rendezvous point, the Basestar is met by Admiral Adama. Roslin finally admits her love for Adama who returns it.

=== Deleted scenes ===
Helo, Eight and D'Anna return to the rebel baseship, they learn from a Six of enemy Cylon boarders. After Eight confronts Helo about breaking the deal and her trust, she's shot dead by a Cavil copy who is subsequently killed by Helo.

== Reception ==
Alan Sepinwall of The Star-Ledger praised Mary McDonnell's performance and was intrigued by Helo's uneasy interactions with the Eight who had downloaded Athena's memories. Lucy Lawless' return "proved worth the wait, between her casually snapping Brother Cavil's neck while still in her resurrection bath, or her snarking on all sides of the Cylon/human alliance once she was free of the Hub." Eric Goldman of IGN.com also praised McDonnell's acting in this episode, and found the episode's final scene satisfying, despite not finding it believable that Adama would have waited for Roslin. "But in and of itself, Roslin being reunited with him and proclaiming that she loved him was incredibly sweet and gratifying, considering all that has occurred between the two throughout the entire series."
