= A Day in the Life (Battlestar Galactica) =

- Battlestar Galactica episode
- Wedding photo of Bill and Carolanne Adama
- Episode no.: Season 3 Episode 15
- Directed by: Rod Hardy
- Written by: Mark Verheiden
- Original air date: February 18, 2007

Guest appearance
- Lucinda Jenney as Carolanne Adama

Episode chronology
← Previous "The Woman King"	Next → "Dirty Hands"
- Battlestar Galactica season 3

"A Day in the Life" is the fifteenth episode of the third season from the science fiction television series, Battlestar Galactica.

== Plot ==
It has been over a month since the fleet last encountered the Cylons and the crew of the Galactica begins the tedious job of conducting repairs and maintenance to their battered ship. In his quarters, Admiral Adama reflects upon his wedding anniversary, dreaming of his estranged wife Carolanne. Adama is awakened when Colonel Tigh arrives to have him sign off on papers. Tigh reports that since most of the Vipers are out of dry-dock, Chief Galen Tyrol will be checking the servos on Airlock 12. Admiral Adama continues to fantasize of Carolanne, but it is quickly revealed that their relationship wasn't perfect. Carolanne accuses him of putting duty before family which is why she divorced him.

Meanwhile, in their quarters, Chief Tyrol and his wife Cally prepare for repair duty. Galen gets their infant son Nicky ready for daycare while Cally protests having to work when she hoped they could spend the day together. Galen reminds her that duty takes priority over their marriage obligations.

The two arrive at the damaged Airlock 12 with deckhand Seelix who enters the control booth. Cally remains disapproving, questioning why Galen picked her to work with him when she should be taking care of the baby. This starts a quarrel between them. Galen tells her things are different now that they've left planet New Caprica and are back aboard Galactica. As Seelix overhears the argument through the intercom, an alarm activates and the airlock doors seal shut. Galen tells Seelix to open the door, but she says there's a pressure differential and the doors sealed automatically. Believing it to be a trivial problem, Galen begins to look for a leak and soon finds a small crack in a patch on the bulkhead.

As Adama walks to a meeting with President Roslin, he continues to fantasize about Carolanne, who accuses him of creating a god-like facade for himself and Roslin as an excuse to keep his distance. Adama meets with Roslin who brings up the issue of Gaius Baltar's upcoming trial. She indicates the trial will be problematic because they'd have to pick a common set of laws for the process, but since the colonies each had their own systems of justice she doesn't know which one to use. She says she wants to appoint an honest and dedicated person to organize and conduct the legal research. She requests Adama's son, Apollo, knowing that his grandfather was a respected lawyer. Adama agrees that Apollo is a good choice but says Apollo had never shown an interest in law. Roslin insists and Adama says he will ask him. Roslin then requests to stay on the Galactica for the rest of the day.

In the pilot ready room, Apollo enters to give a briefing. He overhears the pilots chattering about how many days it has been since they encountered the Cylons, which is currently at 49 days. Apollo berates their celebration saying they only need to consider the number "1"—since "one slip-up" is all it takes to jeopardize the fleet. Adama watches his son's stern lecture from the doorway as Carolanne's image returns to his mind. She scoffs at the fact that he never tells Lee how much he loves him and that he lets performance reviews express his feelings instead of words. Afterwards, Adama tells his son of Roslin's request that he handle the legal proceedings. Apollo is flattered saying he remembers looking through his grandfather's legal textbooks and that he briefly considered becoming a lawyer instead of joining the military. Apollo refuses because the duties of the CAG already consume all his time.

Meanwhile, the situation in the airlock grows critical. Galen's temporary patch of the hole doesn't hold and the breach expands further. He and his wife are beginning to freeze and rapidly losing air. By now, Admiral Adama has been alerted of the crisis and goes to the control room to assess the situation. Adama is frustrated that the backup systems can't be activated, and Apollo explains that extensive battle damage to Airlock 12 knocked out the bypass. Colonel Tigh suggests using explosives to break through the window of the control booth, but Apollo says the window is too strongly reinforced. The amount of explosive necessary to breach it would kill the Tyrols in the blast.

The only option left is a harrowing plan to blow the exterior hatch and rescue them with a Raptor. Adama informs Galen of the plan saying they are taking them "out the front door". Galen asks if they're planning on setting up a docking collar, but Adama replies that there isn't enough time. Cally is visibly shaken and fears they won't survive the explosive egress. Adama tells her not to worry, assuring that people have survived exposure to vacuum for as long as a minute. She begins to worry about Nicky, telling her husband that she knows what happens to orphaned children in the fleet. While Galen moves loose objects closer to the airlock so that they won't be struck during the decompression, Cally asks the Admiral that if anything should happen to them, would he see to Nicky being given to a woman in the fleet named Susan Settler. Adama promises that he'll see to it and tells them to get ready.

Outside the airlock, Athena pilots a Raptor up to the exterior hatch. Inside, Apollo and Starbuck open the side hatch and ready themselves to catch the Tyrols as they are blown out into space. In the airlock, Galen takes tight hold of Cally. He apologizes for being selfish with forcing her to work with him, but admits that he just wanted to enjoy her company. The hatch is blown sending the Tyrols and several cargo containers into space. The Raptor narrowly avoids being struck by the debris and Apollo and Starbuck catch the Tyrols safely. Apollo reports they are alive, but in rough shape.

Once back aboard, Apollo sits with his father reminiscing about his mother Carolanne. He explains that after the divorce, Carolanne took to drinking heavily. Despite his father's devotion to her, he believes his mother never truly loved him.

Down in sickbay, Galen and Cally recover from their incident. Seelix brings Nicky to see his father who painfully rests in a bed. He finds the strength to get to his feet and carries Nicky to Cally, who is in a hyperbaric chamber recovering from decompression sickness.

Meanwhile, Apollo returns to his quarters where his wife Dee tells him that his father sent down a box for him. Apollo is amazed to find it filled with his grandfather's old legal books and shocked that his father had even kept them.

Elsewhere, Admiral Adama has another meeting with Roslin. He brings up a past conversation of hers where she said that if they'd have stayed on New Caprica, she would have found a nice secluded place to build a cabin. She says Baltar's inept leadership and New Caprica's terrain would have made it too difficult. She wonders however, if the Cylons had never returned, would he have eventually left Galactica to settle down himself. He evades the question saying it would have been irrelevant anyway. The image of Carolanne returns to his thoughts who tells him that she knows he would have eventually. As Adama leaves, Roslin says she would have indeed built the cabin.

Adama returns to his quarters and takes one last look at his wedding photo before putting it back inside his locker.

=== Added scene ===
The episode ends with a brief extra scene which takes place earlier in the episode before Colonel Tigh takes maintenance reports to Adama. The scene shows Felix Gaeta walking through a corridor with Dee. Felix says that he has taken notice that the Admiral and the President seem to be spending quite a bit of time together. Dee wonders what he's implying where Gaeta believes there may be an intimate relationship forming.

The rest of the scene continues (available on Syfy.com and as a deleted scene on the DVD release) and shows Gaeta and Dee staring at each other in contemplation of the idea. The two soon begin to laugh hysterically until Colonel Tigh walks up and asks what is so funny. Gaeta and Dee come to attention and state that it's nothing. Tigh takes the reports away and when the coast is clear, the two resume their laughter.

== Emmy Award consideration ==
Edward James Olmos submitted this episode for consideration in the category of "Outstanding Lead Actor in a Drama Series" on his behalf for the 2007 Emmy Awards.
