= Rapture (Battlestar Galactica) =

- Battlestar Galactica episode
- Episode no.: Season 3 Episode 12
- Directed by: Michael Rymer
- Written by: Bradley Thompson; David Weddle
- Original air date: January 21, 2007

Guest appearances
- Lucy Lawless as Number Three; Dean Stockwell as Cavil

Episode chronology
← Previous "The Eye of Jupiter"	Next → "Taking a Break from All Your Worries"
- Battlestar Galactica season 3

"Rapture" is the twelfth episode of the third season from the science fiction television series Battlestar Galactica. Aired on January 21, 2007, this episode marked the return of regular broadcasting after the Christmas mid-season hiatus.

== Plot ==
Apollo holds Samuel Anders at gunpoint when he demands that Apollo do something to rescue Starbuck. Apollo radios Dee who says she sees the smoke from Starbuck's crash site and Apollo orders her to intercept it and rescue Starbuck, which puts Anders at ease for the moment. Anders threatens to kill Apollo if Starbuck dies, and Apollo responds that if that happens he will let him.

The Cylons fear that Admiral Adama will carry out the threat of nuking the planet and is not bluffing. They decide to recall their ships; however, a copy of Number Three, betting that Adama will not fire nukes over just one ship, openly defies the other models and recalls only five of the Raiders. The sixth, which has Gaius Baltar, D'anna Biers, and Brother Cavil on board, stays on course to the planet.

Down on the planet, Apollo and Anders prepare to defend the camp from approaching Cylon Centurions. At the same time, Dee finds Starbuck whose hands are burned, but her Raptor is relatively intact. While repairing it, a drugged Starbuck muses on her relationship with Apollo to Dee, who is well-aware of their affair, as is Anders. After the Raptor is repaired, Dee is forced to fly it and Starbuck back to Galactica herself due to Starbuck's injuries.

Back aboard Galactica, Captain "Helo" Agathon and his wife Athena discuss rescuing their child Hera from the Cylons. Athena has a dangerous plan to resurrect her way onto the Cylon ship, but Helo is hesitant to go through with killing her - he eventually relents and shoots her. Adama reminds Helo that Athena knows sensitive information that the Cylons could use against them, but Helo insists that Athena will not betray them.

Back on the planet, unable to hold the enemy off indefinitely, Apollo calls Tyrol, who is with the Eye of Jupiter, and tells him to get ready to blow up the temple. At the same time, Baltar, D'anna and Cavil arrive at the temple, discover the explosives around the Eye of Jupiter's column and quickly disable them, while Baltar takes note of the spiral symbol on the floor. Cavil eventually turns against D'anna, but is killed by Baltar with a forgotten human gun.

At that moment the planet's star goes nova, which was anticipated as a danger by Gaeta. The nova resembles the Eye of Jupiter drawings in the temple. The light from the nova enters the temple, is deflected by the crystals on the roof and column and shines a light on the spiral symbol on the floor. D'anna enters the light and sees five hooded figures, dressed in white and bathed in a brilliant light.

She moves closer to see their faces and instantly recognizes one of them saying, "You! Forgive me, I had no idea." The being, whose identity remains hidden from the viewer, reaches out to take D'anna's hand, but the scene quickly fades with Baltar taking the figure's place. Baltar agonizingly asks what the five faces were and if he is a Cylon, but D'anna can only say it was beautiful and dies. Tyrol and the rest of the humans arrive and arrest Baltar.

Aboard a Basestar, Athena and Six arrive in the nursery where Boomer (the copy of Number Eight who shot Admiral Adama), is caring for Hera. Athena urges Boomer to come with them, saying Tyrol and Adama still love her, but Boomer says that part of her life is over. Athena decides that Hera needs a human doctor and pleads with Six and Boomer to let her take Hera back to Galactica; if not, the first of a "new generation" will die. Boomer is reluctant and seems ready to kill the baby herself, but Caprica-Six kills Boomer and leaves with Athena and Hera for Galactica.

As the nova expands, the Cylon Basestars jump away and Adama orders that a rescue mission be launched. The raptors rescue the people on the planet and Galactica jumps away just in time. On the flight deck, Anders and Starbuck reunite, along with Apollo and Dee. Helo and Athena take their daughter to Doctor Cottle for treatment, while Caprica-Six is taken to the brig. Baltar, who was brought aboard Galactica in a body bag - despite being alive - is also taken to the brig on the orders of Colonel Tigh.

Helo remembers seeing a painting in Starbucks's apartment that looked just like the Eye of Jupiter drawing in the temple and asks her why she made it, but Starbuck is uncertain, saying she simply liked the pattern.

D'anna is resurrected and is greeted by a Brother Cavil. She smiles, having finally seen the five remaining Cylon models, but before she can elaborate, Cavil tells her that her model series has been determined to be fundamentally flawed and the entire line will be put in cold storage. Her last words are that he will see the five soon too.

== Emmy Award consideration ==
Grace Park submitted this episode for consideration in the category of "Outstanding Supporting Actress in a Drama Series" on her behalf for the 2007 Emmy Awards.
