= Maelstrom (Battlestar Galactica) =

- Battlestar Galactica episode
- Kara Thrace and Leoben on Caprica
- Episode no.: Season 3 Episode 17
- Directed by: Michael Nankin
- Written by: Bradley Thompson; David Weddle
- Original air date: March 4, 2007

Guest appearances
- Georgia Craig as Oracle Yolanda Brenn; Dorothy Lyman as Socrata Thrace

Episode chronology
← Previous "Dirty Hands"	Next → "The Son Also Rises"
- Battlestar Galactica season 3

"Maelstrom" is the seventeenth episode of the third season from the science fiction television series, Battlestar Galactica.

== Plot ==
The episode begins with Starbuck restlessly asleep in her bunk and having a dream in which she finds herself in her apartment on Caprica painting the Eye of Jupiter on her wall. She becomes frustrated and splashes white paint over her artwork as the Cylon Leoben Conoy approaches her from behind. The two begin to aggressively make love until Starbuck awakens, breathing heavily.

Later, Starbuck talks with Helo, who learns of her strange dreams and suggests she see an oracle. During the discussion, Starbuck catches a glimpse of a little beaten girl in a mirror; it is her younger self. Turning about, the child is not there. Starbuck then heads to Dogsville in the hangar and sees the oracle, Yolanda Brenn. She enters the tent, finding a small winged figurine. Suddenly, Brenn speaks from the shadows, explaining that the figurine is a depiction of the goddess Aurora, who signifies change and allows Starbuck to keep it. Before Starbuck can say much, Brenn says she knows why she came. She says she knows of Leoben and the dreams, repeating word-for-word Leoben's remarks of Starbuck's destiny. She tells Starbuck that it all means that her mother, Socrata Thrace (Dorothy Lyman), is trying to tell her something important. Angry and afraid, Starbuck quickly leaves.

Meanwhile, the fleet is undergoing fuel replenishment in the orbit of a gas giant, using the planet's radiation to help hide their presence from the Cylons. After a rendezvous with her husband, Anders, Starbuck tells him about some of the abuse she endured at the hands of her mother. Starbuck says that her mother had an intense phobia of insects. Starbuck was angry with her mother one day, and hid plastic insects in her mother's shoes. As punishment, her mother slammed Starbuck's hand repeatedly in a door.

Later, Starbuck and Hot Dog are on patrol, piloting their Vipers in the clouds of the gas giant. Starbuck catches sight of a Cylon Heavy Raider and gives chase. Because of the radiation, the DRADIS is blind and Hot Dog is unable to get a confirmation of the ship. He soon loses sight of Starbuck, who remains in hot pursuit of the Cylon. In orbit, Admiral Adama aborts the refuelling and orders the fleet to prepare for a jump. Starbuck dogfights the Cylon through the clouds, eventually entering a swirling storm into which the Cylon dives. Strangely, the clouds take on the red, blue and yellow colors of the Eye of Jupiter. Determined to kill the Cylon, Starbuck maintains her pursuit, ignoring the frantic calls from Apollo to pull up before she is crushed by the increasing atmospheric pressure below the cloud deck.

After seeing glimpses of her apartment between flashes of lightning and the outline of her mother standing in the room, Starbuck finally comes to her senses and returns to Galactica. Once aboard, she is shocked by Chief Tyrol's claim that her Viper has no visible damage, even though she felt bullet impacts. Likewise, her gun camera footage shows she was firing at nothing. Admiral Adama meets with Apollo, asking his son if he thinks Starbuck is losing her mind. Apollo says he will talk to her and later finds Starbuck sitting in Memorial Hallway, staring at the pictures on the wall. She tells him if she dies first, he is to place her photo right next to the photo of Kat. Apollo promises, but says if he dies first, he wants to be placed next to the photo of Duck and Nora, who were both lost on New Caprica. Starbuck asks his decision about her flight readiness and he gives her some words of encouragement. Meanwhile, she observes dripping candle wax taking the pattern and colors of the Eye. When Starbuck passes Admiral Adama and President Roslin, she gives the figurine of Aurora to Adama, saying it would make a great figurehead for the model sailing ship in his quarters.

Preparing for her next flight mission, Starbuck stops herself from entering her Viper cockpit when she sees her younger self sitting in the seat. Visibly shaken, she tells Apollo she is unable to trust herself and cannot fly. Apollo comforts her by offering to be her wingman for the flight.

Once more in the sky of the planet, Starbuck catches sight of the Heavy Raider and engages pursuit. Apollo's scopes show no sign of the bogey and he chases after Starbuck, but he quickly loses sight of her. Starbuck again chases the Raider into the swirling storm, where the Cylon turns around and nearly collides with her. Suddenly, the Viper's cockpit canopy is punctured and Starbuck passes out as her fighter begins a wild spin. The cockpit alarms change to the alarm of a clock and the scene changes to Starbuck lying in bed in her apartment on Caprica. She turns off the clock's alarm and immediately finds Leoben sitting by her side.

Starbuck believes she is being tricked again and that this is all a dream or some Cylon mind-game. Leoben assures her that he is there to give her a chance at something she avoided in her past. He gently takes her hand and leads her into another scene change, this time it is her mother's apartment. Fearful, Starbuck sees herself, six years prior, entering her mother's kitchen dressed in her fleet officer uniform. Her mother sits reading a paper and smoking a cigarette. Hoping for some congratulations from her mother for having graduated flight school and becoming an officer, Starbuck instead receives an admonishment for graduating 16th in her class. Starbuck tells her she was 16th out of 117 cadets. Angered, her mother tells her she should have been number one. Starbuck retaliates, thinking that her mother is jealous because she never became an officer, despite having served as a decorated Marine Corporal in the first Cylon War.

Starbuck then notices a medical paper on the table and grabs it despite her mother's objection. The report says her mother has terminal cancer. Starbuck offers sympathy, but her mother rejects it, saying that Starbuck should have pity for herself. In anger, Starbuck walks out the door, vowing to never return and that her mother can die alone. Starbuck relives the moment and sobs.

Leoben then takes her to the bedroom where her mother lies on her deathbed and gives Starbuck another chance to be with her mother as she dies. Starbuck sits next to the bed and notices her mother holds a scrapbook filled with all her childhood drawings, including the swirling Eye. Starbuck takes her mother's hand as she tells her that she is happy she came back. She presses her daughter's hand against her face as she takes her final breath. Starbuck quietly sobs, but is partially relieved to have been at her mother's final moments. Leoben tells her that death is not hard to embrace, and that is the message her mother was trying to tell her all along. Starbuck finally sees Leoben as something else, perhaps not a Cylon, but her spiritual guardian. Leoben says he never claimed he was actually Leoben.

In reality, Starbuck finally awakens to the shouts of Apollo begging her to come back. She moves her hand near the ejection seat lever on her Viper before telling him that she is no longer afraid and will "see him on the other side". Apollo demands that she pull up, but she whispers, "just let me go... they're waiting for me". Apollo then sees an explosion as Starbuck's Viper breaks apart and disintegrates. With no sign that she ejected, Apollo cries out in despair. In orbit, Admiral Adama asks if Apollo has visual contact with Starbuck. Apollo replies "negative...she went in". Adama orders search-and-rescue ships to be dispatched, but Apollo tells him that Starbuck is gone; there is nothing to find. There is stunned silence across the bridge.

Later, Admiral Adama sits quietly in his quarters looking at the Aurora figurine. He sees that it is a perfect fit for the prow of his sailing ship, but in grief and anger, he smashes the model to pieces and begins to sob.

=== Deleted scene ===
Starbuck is inspecting her Viper when she finds a red liquid that looks like blood. She asks Tyrol what the substance is, to which he replies that its hydraulic fluid and says all the birds leak fluid. She angrily demands that he fix the problem, but Tyrol says the seals are worn and replacements are scarce. He promises that the problem is minor and her Viper will fly, but Starbuck does not believe him. Apollo arrives and takes Starbuck aside to cool her temper.

== Production notes ==
The end scene where Adama smashes up his model sailing ship was improvised by Edward James Olmos and was not part of the original script. According to writers Bradley Thompson and David Weddle, Olmos informed episode director Michael Nankin that he was intending to do this, but unlike Nankin, was unaware that the model was not an inexpensive prop built for the production. At the time of filming, only Nankin and the cameramen knew Olmos was going to smash the model. According to Ron Moore, it was a very expensive museum-quality model worth several hundred thousand dollars that was being rented for the production. It was insured, according to Moore.

== Emmy Award consideration ==
Katee Sackhoff submitted this episode for consideration in the category of "Outstanding Supporting Actress in a Drama Series" on her behalf for the 2007 Emmy Awards.
