= Dirty Hands (Battlestar Galactica) =

- Battlestar Galactica episode
- Chief Tyrol is locked up for mutiny
- Episode no.: Season 3 Episode 16
- Directed by: Wayne Rose
- Written by: Jane Espenson; Anne Cofell Saunders
- Original air date: February 25, 2007

Episode chronology
← Previous "A Day in the Life"	Next → "Maelstrom"
- Battlestar Galactica season 3

"Dirty Hands" is the sixteenth episode of the third season from the science fiction television series, Battlestar Galactica.

== Plot ==
A Raptor piloted by Racetrack experiences engine failure soon after launch and collides with Colonial One, nearly killing President Roslin and her aide Tory Foster. An investigation reveals that a recent batch of Tylium fuel contains impurities and Roslin calls upon Xeno Fenner, the director of the fleet's refinery ship, for answers. When Fenner meets Roslin and Admiral Adama, he is sarcastic and uncooperative, calling the situation a "glitch." He admits that it may be his workers' way of getting some attention after repeatedly being ignored regarding the squalid and dangerous conditions they face every day without a single break. Roslin doesn't sympathize, explaining that fuel production is critical and must be maintained. When Fenner quotes text from an underground book by Gaius Baltar, "If you hear the people, you never have to fear the people" and threatens a few more "glitches," Roslin has him arrested.

Adama is stunned by her action and inquires about the book. Visibly angered, Roslin whispers that Gaius Baltar's attorney has passed a manuscript around the fleet written by Baltar entitled, My Triumphs, My Mistakes. It deals with class struggle, and she says she is thinking about having a "good ol' fashioned book burning." Adama contacts Chief Tyrol, informs him of Fenner's arrest, and orders him to go to the refinery ship to take charge of the situation. Tyrol's wife Cally admits to Tyrol that she has read Baltar's book, which discusses the unfair labor differences between the people of the Twelve Colonies. She questions why the people from the poorer colonies like Gemenon, Sagittaron, and Aerelon are forced to work in harsh blue-collar jobs while the more elite and educated colonials from places like Caprica, Tauron and Virgon get to keep their plush white-collar jobs.

Roslin goes to Baltar's cell and demands that he hand over the pages from his book. She lies, saying it was intercepted before anyone could read it, and orders the guards to tear the room apart. She concludes with a partial strip search of Baltar during which Six appears in Baltar's mind and tells him to protect his dignity. Six slides her hand into his open pants, but Baltar stops her. He withdraws the pages of his book and surrenders them to Roslin, who sneers that she's been "dying to see how it ends" and mocks his attempt to appear as a "man of the people."

Meanwhile, Tyrol arrives on the refinery ship and takes a tour of the facility, led by a foreman named Cabott. He witnesses the somber glances from the tired, grime-covered workers who are both men and women ranging in age from the elderly to mere children. Tyrol goes to the massive Tylium storage room where a single, dwindling pile of ore remains. Cabott says they're lucky if the supply lasts long enough to get them out of the system. Next, Tyrol goes to the main conveyor line where the work has completely shut down. Tyrol asks for a reason for the shutdown, but the workers remain silently defiant until a young boy named Milo speaks up and says the pressure seals are broken. Tyrol notices that the seals are completely missing and have been removed by the workers in protest of Fenner's arrest.

Tyrol returns to Galactica and informs Roslin and Adama of the missing seals and explains the workers are buying time for their pleas to be heard. He adds that some of the workers have been doing the same grueling job since the attack on the Colonies and requests Roslin accede to some of their demands for a break. Roslin objects, however, saying it is just as difficult to work aboard the algae processing, recycling and waste handling ships. She sees their work stoppage as extortion and demands the names of the organizers. Tyrol hesitantly surrenders Cabott's name.

Cabott is arrested and joins Fenner in an adjacent cell. When Tyrol visits them, he finds that Cabott is having a breakdown and injuring himself. Fenner reminds Tyrol that Cabott was tortured by the Cylons back on New Caprica, and confinement is causing him post-traumatic stress. Tyrol tells Fenner there is no time for games and demands Cabott reveal where the seals have been hidden. Fenner hesitates, then angrily reveals that they were hidden in the air vents. Tyrol then has the men released and work is resumed aboard the refinery ship.

Later, Tyrol goes to Colonial One to talk to Roslin. He explains parents are passing down their skills to their children, and they are forever stuck doing the same job in the next generation. He says they should be given a chance to choose their future. Roslin understands the problem and tells him to make a list of colonists with relevant skills to supplement those aboard the labor ships. Next, Tyrol deals with a protesting young man named Danny Noon who was pulled from Dogsville. Noon had worked a summer job on a farm to earn money for college, but agriculture is not his career choice. Tyrol tells him the job is only temporary and has the angry youth escorted away.

Tyrol then finds a copy of Baltar's book and opens to a page entitled The Emerging Aristocracy and the Emerging Underclass. Tyrol goes to Baltar's cell and refers to the book. Baltar learns the truth that the book has been leaked and asks Tyrol what he thinks about it. Tyrol responds that he thinks it's a load of crap, disbelieving Baltar's claim that he grew up on a farm on Aerelon—especially since Baltar's accent is different from other Aerelons he knows. Baltar, speaking in an Aerelon accent, states that he learned to mimic the Caprican accent to help hide the fact he was from Aerelon, a poor farming world known as the "food basket for the twelve worlds." Baltar explains the purpose of the book was to show that class-strife has continued to follow the fleet well after the Cylon attack, and they will find that those in the aristocracy will continue to hold onto their power.

Tyrol returns to the refinery ship where work halts when the conveyor system becomes jammed. Fenner says the belt must be repaired or else a back-up will occur which could cause the "hot" Tylium further down the line to go critical and cause a chain reaction that will take out the whole ship. Without stopping the slipping belt, Tyrol finds the problem is a jammed drive mechanism, but he is unable to reach it. Danny Noon frees the jam but injures his arm in the process. Fed up, Tyrol walks to main control levers and shuts down the entire factory. He declares the workers to be on strike.

Aboard Galactica, Starbuck finds her flight mission delayed by hangar workers who are playing cards on a Raptor wing. She demands they get back to work where the senior deckhand, Pollux, tells her that they are only servicing vital missions per orders from Chief Tyrol. Tyrol is immediately arrested. Admiral Adama angrily confronts Tyrol in the brig and orders him to call off the work stoppage, but Tyrol refuses. Adama says he will not tolerate the disobedience of orders, calling it mutiny and reminding him that mutineers are shot, but Tyrol stays put. Adama grabs the phone and orders the arrest of Cally. Alarmed, Tyrol asks what he's doing. To get his point across, Adama says he will execute Cally as mutineer and continue with the rebellious deck crew if he has to. He admits it's something he doesn't want to do, but will to maintain the survival of the fleet. Tyrol relents and calls off the strike. Adama instructs him to report to Roslin, suggesting that Adama was sympathetic but couldn't let the strike go on.

Tyrol meets with Roslin on Colonial One and they talk about the cultural vocations that some colonists are locked into by birth. Tyrol suggests setting up a training program to allow the colonists to learn more than one trade, and a work rotation started so that those in dangerous and dirty jobs get an equal chance to work in more comfortable and safer positions in the fleet. He adds that he'd like to see some of Colonial One's crew get their hands dirty for a change. Roslin agrees, but tells Tyrol to consider the reestablishment of the worker's union that he led back on New Caprica as it will ensure stability within the fleet.

Later, Tyrol calls his deck crew to muster when Starbuck arrives and demands to know why Diana Seelix is 20 minutes late for her first day of pilot training. Seelix is confused and Tyrol apologizes, explaining that Seelix has been promoted to Ensign and assigned to flight training - something she was turned down for earlier because her job as an avionics specialist was too important. Tyrol pins the Ensign rank on her collar and salutes her while Starbuck tells the newly recruited nugget to double-time it to debriefing. Seelix rushes off with an excited smile on her face.

== Notes ==
- The original production title for this episode was "Our Enemies, Ourselves."
