= Crossroads (Battlestar Galactica) =

- Battlestar Galactica episodes
- The "Final Five" Cylon models are shown in a shared dream between Roslin, Athena, and Caprica-Six
- Episode nos.: Season 3 Episodes 19 and 20
- Directed by: Michael Rymer
- Written by: Michael Taylor (Part 1); Mark Verheiden (Part 2)
- Original air dates: March 18, 2007; March 25, 2007

Guest appearances
- Chelah Horsdal as Didi Cassidy; Mark Sheppard as Romo Lampkin

Episode chronology
← Previous "The Son Also Rises"	Next → Razor
- Battlestar Galactica season 3

"Crossroads" (Parts 1 and 2) are the nineteenth and twentieth episodes of the third season and season finale from the science fiction television series, Battlestar Galactica. Neither episode begins with a survivor count.

== Plot ==
=== Part 1 ===
President Roslin and Athena share the same vision of chasing Hera Agathon through the ancient opera house on Kobol, where they also encounter Caprica Six. At Joe's Bar, Colonel Tigh and Samuel Anders share a different form of vision, ethereal music which only the two of them are able to hear.

Just before Baltar's trial is set to begin, Cassidy refuses Roslin's request that Baltar be tried for conspiring with the Cylons. Meanwhile, Baltar is visited in the brig by a woman who asks him to bless her child. He refuses, but she reaffirms her belief in him nonetheless. Although the fleet is nearing the Ionian Nebula, and has not encountered the Cylons for weeks, Adama is unconvinced the fleet has truly outrun them. His suspicions are confirmed when Racetrack's trailing Raptor narrowly dodges an attack by a massive Cylon fleet. When Tigh questions Caprica Six, she informs him the Cylons had found a way to track the fleet's Refinery Ship. The interrogation turns to blows when Six takes her imaginary Baltar's suggestion to bring up Tigh's wife. Shaken, Tigh has Six shackled.

At the beginning of the trial, Cassidy's opening arguments rest on Baltar having been a failed leader and the devastating loss of 5,197 people on New Caprica. Defense attorney Romo Lampkin opens by condemning Baltar in the harshest terms, finally obtaining an unruly shout from a member of the gallery. Lampkin uses the outburst to turn his arguments abruptly into the notion that Baltar is being railroaded to execution and the trial is being held as a formality to justify the carnal desire to punish Baltar beyond any blame he deserved. Lampkin also takes advantage of Roslin's arrival at the courtroom to suggest she would have pursued confrontation with the Cylons, and gotten more people killed than Baltar had by unconditional surrender.

The trial moves further into Baltar's favor when Colonel Tigh takes the witness stand and admits to masterminding the New Caprica Police graduation bombing (see "Occupation"), with Baltar as the primary target. After Cassidy opens up the subject by suggesting Ellen is another victim of Baltar, Lampkin pushes him into eventually confessing to killing Ellen. Lampkin also coaxes Tigh into admitting his drinking problem, and Tigh further degrades his own position when he again hears the ethereal music and angrily yells for it to be turned off. He is effectively barred as a witness after repeatedly admitting he would do or say anything to see Baltar executed.

When Roslin herself takes the witness stand, she confirms for Lee Adama that Baltar helped save her life during her bout with cancer a year beforehand, and later also confirms, over the objections of Admiral Adama, that she had resumed taking medication because her cancer had returned. As the chamalla has hallucinogenic side effects, Roslin's credibility is seriously damaged.

During a recess in the trial, Romo Lampkin asks Lee Adama to consider that his role in the trial may get him expelled from the "aristocracy" of the Adama family in the fleet. Soon afterwards, Lee argues with his father over the principle of trying Baltar. Admiral Adama confirms the trial is a formality and that he already feels Baltar is guilty. He also condemns Lee for the damage done to Saul, though Lee had no knowledge of Ellen Tigh's death, much less that Saul murdered her. In disgust, Lee resigns his commission, and Adama readily accepts it. Later, in their quarters, Dualla takes Lee's role in the trial as the final straw to break their troubled marriage, packs her things and leaves over his pleas to stay.

On Colonial One, Roslin is badgered with questions from reporters about the resurgence of her cancer. Tory Foster, suffering from constantly hearing the music in the same way as Colonel Tigh, angrily tells the reporters to stop prying into Roslin's personal affairs, earning her a private reprimand from Roslin. On Galactica's bridge, Felix Gaeta and Helo review a plan to use the refinery ship as a decoy to lure the Cylons off course, and brood over a gathering storm.

=== Part 2 ===
As Anders and Tory continue to hear the strange music and begin making love, Chief Tyrol is awakened by the music. Both he and Colonel Tigh begin their own searches for its source, but neither can find it. On the hangar deck, Anders realizes that Tyrol is humming the strange music, and the two agree it sounds like something they remember from childhood.

After receiving an injection for her cancer treatments in sickbay, Roslin has another vision of the opera house on Kobol. Also in sickbay, Sharon enters the same vision while holding Hera in her arms and both women wake up screaming. Sharon confirms having shared the experience and likens it to the Cylon ability of "projection." They proceed to question Caprica Six in her cell, and immediately discover that she had the same dream as well. Caprica talks of feeling compelled to protect Hera.

The trial resumes and Felix Gaeta takes the witness stand. He perjures himself by saying Baltar willingly signed the death order to have Roslin, Zarek, and others executed. Rather than attempting to disprove this during cross-examination, however, Lampkin acts on Lee Adama's suggestion and moves for a mistrial, based on prejudicial statements Admiral Adama had made to Lee concerning Baltar's guilt and the trial's outcome. Lee then takes the witness stand, but refuses to testify against his father, instead returning to Lampkin's original line of argument that Baltar, for all his failings, could not be faulted for the tragedy on New Caprica.

By a vote of 3 to 2, the tribunal finds him not guilty and the courtroom erupts in furor. His service having been completed, Lampkin abandons Baltar. Reflecting on the trial, Baltar wonders how he will survive. In CIC, Admiral Adama admits to Roslin's dissatisfaction that he was one of the "not guilty" voters. When the fleet makes the final jump into the Ionian Nebula, Roslin feels faint and a few seconds later all of the ships suffer a power outage and drift. The Galactica crew struggles to restore power. Moving through the darkness and trying to hide his face, Baltar is suddenly surrounded by three people, including the woman who had asked him to bless her child. They take him to what they tell him is "[his] new life."

Caprica Six returns again to the opera house and sees herself, Baltar and Hera looking up at the glowing, robed apparitions of the Final Five Cylons looking down on them from a balcony. Compelled by their own shared auditory hallucination, Tory, Colonel Tigh, Tyrol, and Anders converge on the Galactica gym, where they all hum the melody together, then sing the lyrics, and come to the distressing conclusion that they are all Cylons. When power is restored, DRADIS identifies four Cylon basestars bearing down on the fleet and Admiral Adama orders general quarters. All of the newly discovered Cylons return to their posts but are wary of what they might do. As the other pilots scramble to their ships, Lee returns to his locker to grab his flight gear, despite having been removed from flight status. After launch, Apollo separates from the other Vipers to chase a new DRADIS contact in the nebula. The contact turns out to be Starbuck; she tells a surprised Apollo she has found Earth, and she will lead them there.

As the Cylon and Galactica fleets prepare for battle, the camera zooms out (to show the entire galaxy), and zooms back into a nearby section of the galaxy to show a single planet: Earth.

== Music ==
The song and lyrics that Tory, Tigh, Tyrol and Anders hear is Bob Dylan's "All Along the Watchtower", as adapted by series composer Bear McCreary. Inspired by Jimi Hendrix's version of the song, McCreary enlisted his brother Brendan McCreary to perform the vocals and Oingo Boingo's Steve Bartek to play various guitars and sitars. There is no explanation given in the show as to why this particular song is heard, nor where it comes from. According to a conversation McCreary had with Ronald D. Moore, the version heard in the episode is meant to have been recorded by a Colonial artist rather than by Jimi Hendrix himself.

== The trial ==
The trial has been discussed by Steven S. Kapica as part of his research on the "inquiry into the legal rhetoric and jurisprudential tensions" of the show. Kapica argued that the trial tied into the discourse surrounding "post-9/11 anxieties and American jurisprudence in crisis".

== Emmy Award considerations ==
Mary McDonnell and Jamie Bamber each submitted this episode for consideration in the categories of "Outstanding Lead Actress in a Drama Series" and "Outstanding Supporting Actor in a Drama Series" on their behalf for the 2007 Emmy Awards. Similarly, Mark Sheppard also submitted this episode for consideration of his work in the category of "Outstanding Guest Actor in a Drama Series".

== Notes ==
- Apollo is the last person to see Starbuck before her "death", in "Maelstrom", and is also the first person to see her after her "re-appearance", in this episode, both occasions where they are each flying a Viper.
- To keep Starbuck's return a secret until the end of the episode, Katee Sackhoff was not listed in the opening titles of the episode, but rather in the closing credits.
