= Unfinished Business (Battlestar Galactica) =

- Battlestar Galactica episode
- Episode no.: Season 3 Episode 9
- Directed by: Robert M. Young
- Written by: Michael Taylor
- Original air date: December 1, 2006

Guest appearances
- Kate Vernon as Ellen Tigh; Michael Trucco as Samuel Anders; Rekha Sharma as Tory Foster; Donnelly Rhodes as Cottle; Bodie Olmos as Hot Dog; Luciana Carro as Louanne "Kat" Katraine; Christian Tessier as Tucker "Duck" Clellan; Nicki Clyne as Cally; Leah Cairns as Margaret "Racetrack" Edmondson; Dominic Zamprogna as Jammer

Episode chronology
← Previous "Hero"	Next → "The Passage"
- Battlestar Galactica season 3

"Unfinished Business" is the ninth episode of the third season of the science fiction television series Battlestar Galactica. It aired on December 1, 2006. Writer Michael Taylor received a nomination for the 2006 Nebula Award in the "Best Script" category for this episode.

An extended version of this episode with 25 minutes of extra footage was included on the Region 1 DVD and Blu-ray releases of the third season and in the UK exclusively on the Blu-ray release

== Plot ==
The crew of Galactica have reinstated an old military tradition by setting up a boxing ring and putting rank aside — by the placing of dog tags in a metal box — crew and officers freely duke it out in one-on-one matches. Colonel Tigh is match referee.

Elsewhere in a bunk room, Starbuck has finished having sex with her estranged husband Samuel Anders. Starbuck remarks that their encounter was just what she needed and gets up to leave. Anders replies that he wants to reconcile their marriage. Starbuck responds that she's not ready yet and heads to the fights.

Kara heads past the boxing match and observes Major Apollo losing a match against Captain "Helo" Agathon. Apollo leaves the ring and picks up his dog tags to signify that he is quitting the competition. However, Starbuck drops her tags in the box and goads an initially reluctant Apollo into fighting her instead.

Admiral Adama arrives with President Roslin, who is a boxing enthusiast, to watch the next series of fights; Kat wins against a female crew member, and Hot Dog is quickly knocked out by Starbuck.

Adama then observes Chief Tyrol and his wife Cally, recalling a moment when the fleet first settled New Caprica and Tyrol and Cally were still assigned to Galactica. Tyrol asked Adama for permission to leave the ship so he and Cally's child could be born and raised down on the planet. Adama refused the request, telling Tyrol he and Cally are needed on board.

Back at the boxing match, Adama overhears Tyrol give one of his crew permission to watch the fight although the crew member has not yet finished fixing a broken spacecraft. Without warning, the Admiral steps into the ring and tells Chief Tyrol to get his "fat, lazy ass" in there with him. Tyrol enters as ordered, thinking the match will be a joke until the bell rings and Adama knocks him to the mat with a fast right hook. Adama taunts Tyrol asking him if this is how he fought down on New Caprica. Insulted, Tyrol rises to his feet and begins to lay into the Admiral. Adama is easily over matched as Tyrol angrily pummels him into the ropes asking if this is what he wanted. Adama is saved for the moment by the bell. Adama sits to rest while Doctor Cottle looks him over. Roslin rushes to Adama's side and gives him some advice on how to win, but Adama replies that he does not intend to win.

Round two begins with Tyrol rushing Adama back into the ropes with more fierce pummeling. Adama does not do much to resist, with his face beaten to a bloody pulp. Tyrol eventually floors the old man who stays down for the count. A stunned silence falls over the crowd as Tyrol and Tigh help Adama back to his feet. The fight is over and Adama takes a moment to tell the crew that he has let them all get "too close" to him, something which must come to an end, and he will no longer forgive laxity among the crew as he's done in the past - he let them drop their guard during the initial settlement of New Caprica and left humanity exposed to the Cylons as a result. As the Admiral leaves, Tigh announces the matches are over and orders everyone back to duty.

Starbuck will not give up her planned fight with Apollo, however. They both enter the ring and let loose with all their bottled up hostilities. As fists fly, flashbacks take the scene back to New Caprica. During the late evening of a ground-breaking ceremony, Apollo and Starbuck found a moment alone to talk. Starbuck had (literally) drunk Anders under the table, and he had passed out cold on the ground, under a table. Apollo took the opportunity to ask Starbuck about her plans for the future, musing about what will become of her relationship with Anders.

Back to the present, the boxing match between Starbuck and Apollo intensifies. Dee watches as Anders remarks that the two look like they'll kill each other.

On New Caprica the two eventually head outside the city to a secluded field and they end up making love. Afterward, Starbuck wonders what will happen if anyone finds out about what they have done — especially Anders or Dee. Apollo stands up and shouts to the night sky that he loves Kara Thrace, unconcerned about anyone hearing him. Hesitantly at first, Starbuck eventually does the same shouting that she loves Lee Adama. Apollo says he will tell Dee about the new situation and asks that Starbuck do the same with Anders.

In the boxing ring, Apollo knocks Starbuck to the mat at which point the fighting turns dirty. Starbuck does a leg sweep and trips Apollo. As he gets back to his feet, Starbuck kicks him in the face. Seeing the match is getting personal, the few remaining spectators begin to leave the room.

Flashing to the next morning on New Caprica, Admiral Adama and Roslin talk with Chief Tyrol and Cally. Adama tells Tyrol that he has given the Chief's situation some thought and that he has decided they can remain on New Caprica to have their child. Apollo awakes in the field and finds Starbuck has gone. Returning to the town, he meets his father, who tells him that Starbuck and Anders have just got married in a surprise ceremony earlier that morning. Still reeling from the news, Apollo meets the newlyweds walking down the street. Anders reveals that the wedding was Starbuck's idea and that she "popped the question to him" only that morning. Apollo recovers enough to congratulate Anders and wish him luck, adding that "you're going to need it" as he glances towards Starbuck. Apollo then walks off in a dazed shock back to a Raptor to return to Pegasus, with Dee waiting on the entry ramp. Apollo walks straight from his confrontation with Starbuck to Dee and immediately kisses her.

Back at the boxing ring, Starbuck and Apollo have battled each other to a stand-still. They slump against each other in the middle of the ring with their arms around each other. An awkward silence follows, and the spectators shuffle out of the hall. Anders leaves too, while Dee lowers her head. Starbuck whispers to Apollo that she has "missed him". Apollo replies that he missed her, too. As the scene fades out, there is the trace of a smile upon Starbuck's face.
