= The Eye of Jupiter (Battlestar Galactica) =

- Battlestar Galactica episode
- Episode no.: Season 3 Episode 11
- Directed by: Michael Rymer
- Written by: Mark Verheiden
- Original air date: December 15, 2006

Guest appearances
- Lucy Lawless as Number Three; Dean Stockwell as Cavil

Episode chronology
← Previous "The Passage"	Next → "Rapture"
- Battlestar Galactica season 3

"The Eye of Jupiter" is the eleventh episode of the third season of the science fiction television series Battlestar Galactica. It aired on December 15, 2006, and was filmed in Kamloops, BC, Canada.

== Plot ==
The refugee fleet orbits an algae planet for two weeks. Members of Galactica set up a base camp on the surface while harvesting food supplies. After Starbuck haphazardly lands a Raptor, Apollo admonishes her behavior, but the two soon embrace in a kiss. Apollo wants to stop hiding their feelings and divorce their respective spouses, but Starbuck says marriage is a sacrament with the gods which she vowed not to break.

Aboard a Cylon Basestar, Gaius Baltar is awakened by the cries of a baby. He trailed the sound of the cries to a room where the Cylon/Human child Hera is being cared for by a Number Eight who says the child is sick.

Back in orbit of the algae planet, four Cylon Basestars jump near the Galactica, a force that is big enough to overpower the humans. However, they do not attack, they instead make radio contact with Gaius Baltar speaking from the Basestar, and a Cylon delegation comes on board the Galactica. The delegation consists of D'anna, Boomer (the number eight copy that shot Adama), Brother Cavill, and Baltar. Boomer is removed from the negotiations when recognized by Athena. During their brief discussion in the hallway, Athena finds out that her daughter Hera is, in fact, alive but ill, onboard one of the Basestars.

President Roslin leaves the negotiations early, disgusted by Baltar's collusion with the Cylons, despite his assertion that the humans are alive only because of him. The Cylons offer to let the humans go in return for the Eye of Jupiter on the surface. Adama retorts that he will not hesitate to nuke the planet and the humans on it to ensure the Cylons do not get their hands on the Eye. The Cylons respond with a warning that they will not allow humans to return from the surface of the planet to Galactica.

At the base camp, fearing a Cylon ground attack, Apollo orders Starbuck, her husband Anders, and his wife Dee, to round up the workers and equip them with arms and start fabricating telium mines. Anders scoffs, stating the workers are not soldiers and do not stand a chance if attacked. Apollo believed that organizing a militia was Anders' specialty back on Caprica, but Anders argues his militia conducted hit-and-run attacks. Knowing Anders is being defiant on purpose, Apollo tells him that they need to put their differences aside to which Anders says that he is not blind to what has been going on between Apollo and Starbuck. Anders also reveals that Lee is not the first person Starbuck has cheated on him with, but he knew Kara's personality when they married.

The Cylons contemplate the deadlock they are in with the humans when D'anna reveals that she sent a Cylon Heavy Raider to the surface when the Basestars jumped into orbit, hoping it would be missed in the commotion, which was indeed the case. This means there are already Centurions on the surface making their way to the temple.

President Roslin admits to having colluded with Dr. Cottle to fake Hera's death and hand her over to be adopted. Her whereabouts are unknown after the Exodus from New Caprica, and she may well indeed be with the Cylons. Helo and Athena are outraged and can only think about reuniting with their daughter at any cost.

Back on the planet, Starbuck flies her Raptor on a recon mission where she spots a Centurion emplacement. They fire a missile that damages the Raptor and causes Starbuck to spiral out of control. Apollo learns that Starbuck's Raptor was shot down, and Anders demands they mount a rescue operation. Apollo says they do not have enough workforce, and they must hold the camp. Anders tells Apollo off and starts to head out on his own, but Apollo orders Sergeant Mathias to stop him. Mathias draws a weapon and points it at Anders's head.

Galactica's DRADIS detects the launch of six Cylon Heavy Raiders heading toward the planet in space. Maintaining his vow to destroy the temple, Adama orders the armament of the nukes. The Cylons likewise detect the opening of Galactica's missile doors and prepare for a counter-attack of their own, ending the episode as a mid-season cliffhanger.

== Notes ==
Many of the runes which appear on the central column of the Eye of Jupiter artifact are stylized Hebrew letters written in both standard right to left format and reversed as if seen in a mirror. The letters appear to be random and form no words. Most easily recognizable are gimmel (ג), mem (מ), and final tsadik (ץ).
