= The Passage (Battlestar Galactica) =

- Battlestar Galactica episode
- Kat lies dying on Galactica
- Episode no.: Season 3 Episode 10
- Directed by: Michael Nankin
- Written by: Jane Espenson
- Original air date: December 8, 2006

Guest appearances
- Lucy Lawless as Number Three; Donnelly Rhodes as Cottle; Luciana Carro as Louanne "Kat" Katraine; Brad Dryborough as Louis Hoshi; Bodie Olmos as Hot Dog; Leah Cairns as Margaret "Racetrack" Edmondson

Episode chronology
← Previous "Unfinished Business"	Next → "The Eye of Jupiter"
- Battlestar Galactica season 3

"The Passage" is the tenth episode of the third season from the science fiction television series Battlestar Galactica. It aired on December 8, 2006.

The episode is notable for its special effects and action sequences, reminiscent of Season 1.

== Plot ==
The fleet's food supply has been contaminated, forcing everyone to subsist on rapidly dwindling food rations. Athena, who has been doing reconnaissance, discovers a planet where abundant algae is found that can be used as a nutritious, if unappetizing, food source. Unfortunately, the planet is located on the other side of a vast, highly radioactive star cluster that is too big to go around. The fleet must cross the cluster or risk starvation. Because of the size of the cluster, each ship must jump to a point within it before jumping again to the planet.

Admiral Adama proposes that each civilian ship be paired with a Raptor, which will serve as a guide for each ship and direct it safely towards the algae planet. Each pilot is issued a white radiation warning badge which turns solid black when the pilot has been exposed to their maximum safe level of radiation. At that point that pilot is to be pulled off the operation.

Following the strategy meeting, Kat is approached by a disheveled-looking man named Enzo who addresses her as "Sasha", the man tells her she cannot deny who she really is. Enzo continues to harass her, trying to get her to cooperate in some unnamed and apparently criminal activity. It is evident that the two know each other, despite Kat's protestations to the contrary.

Starbuck spies on one of their conversations, questions Enzo and then confronts Kat about what she heard. Kat tearfully admits she was once a "trucker" — a smuggler of drugs and of criminals, and says she stole the identity of a woman who had died just prior to the Cylon attack on the Colonies. Starbuck says one theory behind the success of the Cylon attack was that the Cylons might have infiltrated Caprica with aid from smugglers like Kat.

Deeply shaken by the insinuation she is a traitor, Kat retorts at the time the Colonials didn't know some Cylons had human appearances. If any were Cylons, she wasn't aware, and begs Starbuck not to tell Admiral Adama. Kat tells Starbuck she will tell him herself.

Inside the Cylon fleet, Gaius Baltar grows concerned about the strange behavior of a Number Three. Wondering what she could possibly be up to, he learns from Caprica Six that her behavior is causing concern among the other Cylons as well. Baltar confronts Three, learning that she keeps committing suicide and resurrecting, over and over again. Three says that during her resurrections, she sees the five humanoid Cylons that have yet to be revealed, even drawing pictures of them. Baltar, still wondering if he could be a Cylon himself, asks if he is one of the remaining five, but Three says her visions are muddled and she can give no further details.

Back at the Colonial fleet, many of Galactica's pilots help execute Apollo's plan. As the mission proceeds, the pilots become more and more fatigued and sickened by the intense radiation. Kat in particular is traumatized by the loss of two ships, the Adriatic (which was being escorted by Hot Dog) and the Carina (which was being escorted by Kat herself).

Kat is plunged into a deep state of depression from a combination of guilt about her false identity, the loss of the ships, and the physical and psychological stresses of flying through the cluster itself. In her depression, she steals a white radiation badge (out of Helo's locker) and uses it to replace her own black one. She also conceals that her hair has started to fall out due to overexposure to radiation.

Kat makes one last attempt to guide a civilian ship. This time, like the others, the civilian ship goes adrift and becomes hidden by the brilliant light of the cluster. The mid-cluster jump point rapidly becomes unstable and even more lethal, prompting Admiral Adama to order all Raptors to jump to the planet, whether or not they have located their associated civilian ship. Kat vows not to lose another ship and disobeys the order. In her persistent efforts to locate the lost ship, she is exposed to a lethal dose of radiation. She successfully guides the ship to the algae planet. When she returns to Galactica, she is greeted with a round of applause from Adama and much of the Galactica crew, Starbuck included. However, she collapses as soon as she gets out of her Raptor.

Back on the Cylon Basestar, Three and Baltar visit the Basestar's hybrid. Believing every cryptic word the Hybrid utters has meaning, Baltar gets close to her to listen. Against Three's advice, Baltar tries to touch the Hybrid, who immediately grabs Baltar's arm and tells him to find "a hand that lies in the shadow of the light in the eye of the husband of the eye of the cow" before falling back in silence. Baltar and Three try to interpret her oracular words, eventually determining that the eye of the cow is a reference to "cow-eyed" Hera. Hera's husband is the god Jupiter, and the two conclude the "Eye of Jupiter" is a planet in the shadow of a star cluster - another clue to the location of Earth. Baltar speculates the hand could be a reference to the final five Cylons.

Back at the Colonial fleet, orbiting a planet in the shadow of a star cluster, Starbuck visits the dying Kat in sickbay in remorse over her earlier words to her. She gives Kat a bottle of sleeping pills, "just in case she needs them". Admiral Adama also visits Kat and tells her that he is promoting her again to CAG. Kat is hesitant to accept, and tells Adama that there is something about her that he should know. Adama just says that whatever she was going to say wouldn't change what she had already accomplished.

The scene changes to a briefing room. All of the Galactica's pilots are gathered in front of a chart listing the command structure of the flight group. The pilots somberly watch as Admiral Adama swaps Kat's name with Apollo's, so making her the CAG.

Later, Starbuck is shown, trying to hold back tears as she affixes Kat's picture to the wall commemorating the missing and deceased. Apollo watches behind her.

== Production ==
According to Ron Moore's podcast, this episode was heavily re-edited after the initial rough-cut was shot, drastically changing it not merely from the original script, but what was planned when initially shooting. The overall effect is that many details of the plot are very different from what writer Jane Espenson's initial script called for.
