= Lee Adama =

Character in Battlestar Galactica

- Battlestar Galactica character
- Jamie Bamber as Lee "Apollo" Adama
- First appearance: Miniseries
- Last appearance: "Daybreak"
- Portrayed by: Jamie Bamber

In-universe information
- Alias: Apollo
- Species: Human
- Gender: Male
- Title: Captain (BSG miniseries - Episode 2.10); Lieutenant (Episode 2.11 - 2.12); Captain (Episode 2.13 - 2.16); Major (Episode 2.17); Commander (Episode 2.18 - 3.05, BSG: Razor); Major (Episode 3.06 - 3.19); Commanding Officer of the Battlestar Pegasus (BSG: Razor, Episode 2.18 - 3.04); Caprica delegate, Quorum of Twelve (Episode 4.03 - 4.08); Acting President of the Twelve Colonies (Episode 4.08 - 4.10); Vice President of the Twelve Colonies (Episode 4.15 - finale)
- Family: William Adama (father); Carolanne Adama (mother); Zak Adama (brother)
- Colony: Caprica

Leland Joseph "Lee" Adama (callsign "Apollo") is a fictional character in the television series Battlestar Galactica. He is portrayed by actor Jamie Bamber, and is one of the main characters in the series. His first appearance was in the 2003 Battlestar Galactica miniseries.

== Character biography ==
=== Early life ===
Lee Adama was born to William Adama, a veteran of the First Cylon War, and his wife, Carolanne Adama.

Lee had a younger brother, Zak Adama. Their father strongly encouraged both boys to join the Colonial Fleet and become Viper pilots. Zak died in an accident after being granted flight status, against the better judgment of his flight instructor and fiancée, then-Lieutenant Kara "Starbuck" Thrace. Zak's death created a rift between Lee Adama and his father, which would only be healed two years later after the Destruction of the Twelve Colonies.

=== After the destruction of the Twelve Colonies ===
By the time of the Cylons' devastating attack on the Twelve Colonies, Lee Adama is a Captain in the Colonial Fleet Reserve with the call sign "Apollo". He is a special guest at the decommissioning ceremonies for Battlestar Galactica, commanded by his father. After Major Jackson "Ripper" Spencer, the Galactica's CAG (Commander of the Air Group) is killed in battle, Lee Adama becomes senior surviving pilot, then joins the Galactica crew and becomes its CAG.

Lee Adama's strained relationship with his father also causes him to become a strong supporter of Colonial President Laura Roslin, who often butts heads with William Adama. Roslin, unfamiliar with the military, appoints Lee Adama to be her personal advisor.

Early in their relationship, President Laura Roslin often referred to Lee Adama as "Captain Apollo". Lee once corrected her, stating "Apollo" was his call sign, but President Roslin replied "'Captain Apollo' has a nice ring to it." Upon joining Galactica's crew, Apollo was a bit of an outsider but after proving himself in several missions as more than just the "old man's son" he earned the respect of his fellow pilots and soon became one of the crew.

When Kara Thrace goes missing after being shot down over an unnamed red moon, Lee takes a leading role in the search for the missing pilot. However, he and his father are eventually forced to abandon the search for Starbuck. President Roslin points out that their personal feelings are taking precedence over the welfare of the fleet, leading to the difficult decision to cease the search. Fortunately, Starbuck is able to return to Galactica using a Cylon Raider she shot down. However, the incident cements the father-son bond between William Adama and his surviving son. Lee questions how long his father would search for him, were he missing, to which the elder Adama responds, "If it were you, we'd never leave."

Lee is part of the strike team sent by then-Commander Adama to Colonial One to terminate Laura Roslin's presidency after she encourages Kara Thrace to abscond with a captured Cylon Raider. On board Colonial One, Lee has a change of heart, declaring that it isn't worth it to sacrifice democracy. He puts his gun to Colonel Saul Tigh's head. Tigh calmly tells Lee, "This is mutiny, you know that." Tigh takes control of the situation after Roslin surrenders and is able to take both Roslin and Lee into custody.

Lee is present in the Galactica's CIC shortly thereafter, when the Cylon infiltrator known as Lieutenant Junior Grade Sharon "Boomer" Valerii shoots Commander Adama twice in the chest; despite his disagreement with his father over deposing Roslin, he tries to comfort his father after being shot. On Tigh's orders, Lee is physically dragged from his father's side and thrown in the brig. Needing Lee's services as CAG, Tigh later releases Lee on parole. Lee will perform his duties as before, but "make no attempt to free [Roslin] or sow insurrection among the crew", and will return to the brig when not on duty.

Nonetheless, Lee breaks his parole after Tigh's leadership takes a disastrous turn and results in civilian deaths. He helps Roslin to lead a breakaway fleet to Kobol. After Commander Adama and President Roslin make a personal effort to heal the divisions in the fleet, Lee returns to duty on Galactica. Lee is one of the five people who see firsthand the map to Earth in the Tomb of Athena on Kobol.

After the Battlestar Pegasus joins the fleet, Lee is temporarily transferred to the Pegasus, given duties flying Raptors rather than Vipers, and even demoted to Lieutenant. All of these misfortunes are reversed after the successful attack on the Cylon Resurrection ship, the death of Rear Admiral Helena Cain, and his father's promotion to flag rank. However, Lee battles with depression at this time, confessing to Kara Thrace "he didn't want to make it back alive."

While on leave on the Cloud 9 luxury liner, Lee is accidentally shot by Kara Thrace during a hostage rescue. He takes almost a month to recover from this wound, during which time he is promoted to Major and consummates his long-simmering relationship with Petty Officer Second Class Anastasia Dualla. He is assigned to Pegasus to assist the new commanding officer, Commander Barry Garner. After he successfully commands the ship during a Cylon surprise attack in which Garner is killed, Lee is quickly promoted from Major to Commander, and given command of Pegasus.

=== New Caprica and the Second Exodus ===
Shortly before the Roslin-vs.-Baltar presidential election, the fleet discovers a somewhat habitable planet inside of a nebula, presumably safe from Cylon discovery, which is named New Caprica. After Gaius Baltar wins the presidential election, he orders the establishment of permanent settlements on the planet. The Galactica and Pegasus begin a monotonous orbital defense patrol.

Months later, at a party commemorating the ceremonial groundbreaking on New Caprica, Lee and Kara Thrace both become inebriated. During the celebration, they express their love for each other, make love, and subsequently fall asleep together. However, Kara wakes up first and departs. When Lee wakes and returns to the settlement he finds Kara has married Samuel Anders. This betrayal causes a lot of bad feeling between Adama and Thrace. He takes to overeating and puts on a lot of weight; he also marries his new first officer, Anastasia Dualla, now a Lieutenant Junior Grade.

Eight months later the Cylons find New Caprica, and take control over the colonists. With only a skeleton crew manning his ship, Lee is forced to flee with the rest of the fleet hoping to return again to fight off the Cylons and save the civilian population.

Four months later still, as the Galactica and Pegasus lay plans to rescue the civilians trapped on New Caprica, the psychological impact of the past year is also obvious: after previously being in good physical shape, Lee has become overweight, sentimental and "soft", to the point where it interferes with his ability to command the Pegasus. When contact with the resistance movement on New Caprica is established, Lee is ordered by his father to take the Pegasus and continue the search for Earth while the Galactica attempts to liberate the planet. When Galactica is near destruction, Lee and Pegasus come to the rescue, giving his father's ship time to jump out. Under heavy fire from four Cylon Basestars, the Pegasus is heavily damaged, having left its Vipers to defend the rest of the fleet. Lee orders the crew to abandon ship in Raptors, the Pegasus then rams a Cylon basestar, instantly destroying both vessels, and a large piece of flight pod wreckage damages or destroys a second basestar.

Lee's first role after the rescue of the civilian population appears to be connected to conducting some kind of head-count or census of the rescued civilians. It is in this capacity he notices certain confirmed survivors have gone missing, having been executed by The Circle for collaborating with the Cylons. He then returns to the role of Galactica's CAG, with the rank of Major. After much hard physical training, he loses the excess weight he gained over the previous year and asks Captain Karl "Helo" Agathon to remind him to never let himself go like that again.

Lee advocates using captured Cylons infected with a strain of lymphocytic encephalitis as biological weapons to exterminate the Cylon race. His plan is approved by President Roslin, but is thwarted by Captain Karl "Helo" Agathon, the Galactica's executive officer at the time.

The renewed strength of his bond with his father is shown when his father chooses to confess to Lee about his fears he may have inadvertently provoked the Cylon onslaught on the Colonies.

=== Resignation from Colonial Forces and legal aspirations ===
The father-son relationship between Lee and Adama sours after the death of Kara Thrace, whom Lee loved deeply and whom Adama considered as close as a daughter. Both grieve, but Lee is visibly shaken by the loss, while Adama tries to move forward. Recognizing that his son has become unhinged by her death, Adama pulls Lee from flight duty and assigns him the task of leading the security detail for the defense attorney of Gaius Baltar. Adama views Baltar's trial as little more than a public relations exercise. Lee suspects his father is being overprotective, fearing to lose him as he did Kara. After two assassination attempts on Baltar's lawyer, Romo Lampkin, the culprit is identified. Adama then reinstates Lee as CAG, not wanting to expose him to the dangers of potential assassination attempts. However, Lee has developed a keen interest in Colonial law after reading his grandfather's law books and believes he could assist Lampkin in preparing the case. Despite Adama's resistance, Lee refuses to resume his duties as CAG and joins the legal team.

During the trial, Admiral Adama becomes infuriated upon learning that Saul Tigh, now a witness, is compelled to admit that he killed his own wife on New Caprica. Adama blames Lee, suspecting that his son provided the information to Lampkin. Adama urges Lee to cease assisting Baltar, but Lee refuses. Tensions escalate, leading to Lee resigning his commission after Adama openly declares that Lee lacks integrity and accuses him of being a "coward" for purportedly allowing Romo to question Saul.

Shedding the uniform, Lee starts to view the trial as an exercise in justice rather than a trial of a specific individual. He personally takes on the cross-examination of President Laura Roslin, confronting her about her renewed use of the hallucinogenic compound chamala-extract, which she asserts is a treatment for her relapse of cancer. While Lee sees this move as justified in preserving justice within the fleet, it exacerbates tensions in his relationships with both his father and Roslin. Additionally, it prompts his wife to finally leave him.

After Laura's deposition, Lee is the last witness called, following Felix Gaeta's perjury in stating President Baltar willingly signed a mass execution warrant. Lee proclaims in court nearly all those in positions of power throughout the Fleet, including himself, are guilty of murder and treason to some degree; because Baltar is broadly reviled in Fleet society, human civilization is scapegoating the ex-President in an effort to expunge its guilt and shame. Lee ultimately realizes he was being manipulated by Lampkin, who boldly predicted to Baltar he has no greater ally than a son trying to flee his father's shadow.

Following Baltar's acquittal, the Fleet is once again discovered by the Cylons. Despite having resigned his commission, Lee dons a flight suit and pilots Viper 3 to aid in defending the fleet from the Cylons. While in flight, he notices something on his wing, discovering it to be another Viper flown by Kara Thrace. She reassures him, saying, "It's okay, don't freak out, it's really me. I've been to Earth, I know where it is, and I'm gonna take us there."

While reviewing his gun camera footage, Lee tells his father that since Baltar's trial, he feels he can do more outside the military, even as his father offers to return his wings. Adama is visibly upset but ultimately accedes to his son's wishes.

At a party, Lee drinks several toasts to the Galactica, his friends, Rear Admiral Adama, the Fleet and "to absent friends." As he leaves the Galactica, the pilots and Command staff salute him while he boards the Raptor taking him off the ship. Dualla presents Lee with his Viper wings in a frame.

Lee begins his political career as the Caprica Delegate to the Quorum of Twelve. Following the disappearance of President Roslin aboard the defecting Cylon basestar, Lee searches for an alternative Presidential candidate to Tom Zarek. After a tense confrontation with a despairing Romo Lampkin, during which he is informed of his nomination with a gun to the head, Lee accepts his candidacy. Aboard Colonial One, Lee Adama is inaugurated as the Acting President of the Twelve Colonies of Kobol.

=== Earth ===
After his father's return to Galactica, President Adama is faced with a hostage crisis instigated by the Cylon D'Anna. She demands the Four Cylons within the Colonial fleet reveal themselves and find their way to the Rebel baseship; until then, a Colonial hostage on the baseship would be killed every 15 minutes.

Amid his father's nervous breakdown following Tigh's confession, Lee gained the upper hand. Quickly, he had three of the final five individuals standing in an airlock. D'Anna, feeling cornered and prepared to nuke the civilian fleet, seemed hopeless in the confrontation until Starbuck arrived with the coordinates to Earth. Lee believed that withholding the information would only prolong a pointless war, so he shared the discovery with D'Anna. He ensured that Cylons and humans would travel to Earth and forge a new home together.

The Fleet's arrival at Earth was a bittersweet experience for Adama. Joy, elation and relief quickly turned to dismay and horror upon witnessing a devastated cityscape once the thirteenth colony.

After returning to Galactica, Lee and his ex-wife Anastasia Dualla share a "date." After Lee departs, Dualla fatally shoots herself in the head wishing to hold onto the reconciliation as her last memory.

In the wake of Tom Zarek's failed coup, Lee is appointed Vice President of the Colonies by President Laura Roslin, and it is made clear while she will retain the title of President, Lee will handle the "heavy lifting."

Admiral Adama decides to lead a possibly one-way rescue mission for Hera, and when volunteers are requested, Lee is the first to step forward. Leading one of the assault teams into the Colony, he successfully retrieves Hera and brings her safely back to the Galactica. Upon reaching the second Earth, Lee proposes that the survivors abandon their ships and technology, taking the opportunity to break the cycle of violence and start anew. The survivors agree to the plan, willingly allowing the fleet to be destroyed as they settle on Earth with their existing supplies. With a fresh chance at life, Lee expresses interest in exploring the new planet.

== Relationships ==
- William Adama: Lee's father and current commander of the fleet and Galactica. Although strained at the beginning, his relationship with his son has evolved into a mutual love and respect. Lee then quit his role as CAG to defend Baltar full-time and was on very bad terms with Bill Adama. Following the trial, the two reconciled; Lee being offered the opportunity to return to the service.
- Kara Thrace: Although the extent of his relationship with Kara Thrace, callsign Starbuck, before joining Galactica has never fully been explained, they share one of the strongest bonds on the show. It is revealed in the series finale Lee met Kara while she was dating Zak Adama. The three had a dinner party in Kara's apartment, and a drunken Kara dared Lee to make love to her while Zak was passed out on the sofa. The two stopped themselves when Zak briefly woke, but it is clear the attraction between Lee and Kara existed from the beginning of their friendship. Aboard Galactica, the two often have a volatile relationship, both professionally and personally. They almost consummated their relationship in "Scar", and have often been known to be jealous of each other's lovers. While not on good terms since finally sleeping together on New Caprica, their relationship seems to have improved since facing off in an emotional boxing match in "Unfinished Business". In the beginning of season 3 Lee and Kara seem to be on the verge of a serious relationship until Kara suddenly gets married. This does not put a stop to the tension between the characters; however, Lee won't cheat on his wife, Dee, and Kara doesn't want to divorce her husband, Anders, saying divorce is a sin in "The Eye of Jupiter". After Kara returns from the dead at the beginning of season 4, Lee supports her claims she can lead the fleet to Earth. Aside from a brief kiss during the mutiny aboard Galactica, Lee and Kara's relationship is not explored much during the final season, although the two characters share a final scene together in the series finale, with Kara mysteriously disappearing when Lee briefly looks away from her.
- Laura Roslin: President of the Colonies. Appointed Lee as her military advisor in Season 1. Over the course of the show Lee has consistently sided with Roslin over his father, most notably when he refused to arrest her for defying his father's orders and later when he defected with her and nearly a third of the fleet to go to Kobol. Since then, however, their relationship has deteriorated. Assigned to Gaius Baltar's security during his trial for the crimes committed on New Caprica, Lee takes an active interest in Baltar's defense to the point of questioning Laura Roslin himself when the President took the stand. In an attempt to undermine her credibility, Lee forced the President to confess she had resumed taking chamalla, the hallucinogenic alternative cancer therapy. While Lee's reasoning was the President had become addicted, a disappointed and betrayed Roslin was forced to reveal her cancer had in fact returned. In Season 4, Lee resigns his post as CAG and takes up a position as Quorum Delegate for Caprica, which finds his idealism conflicting with Roslin's more totalitarian and secretive approach to fleet politics. However, Lee gains Roslin's respect with his handling of the hostage situation created by D'Anna as the acting president, with her saying his duty to the fleet is not over and the human race will need people like Lee Adama to lead them in the coming days.
- Anastasia Dualla: Former communications NCO on Galactica. She was Lee Adama's executive officer aboard Pegasus and after forming a relationship with Lee, she married him. Later, Dee left her husband after he took a job on Baltar's defense team and relentlessly attacked Laura Roslin on the stand, forcing her to reveal her chamalla use. After the discovery of the planet originally called Earth, Lee and Dee briefly reestablished their relationship. However, this does not stop the depressed Dee from committing suicide after Earth is found to be unsuitable for colonization. Lee is deeply shaken by her death, and knows that he will ultimately never understand her reasons for suicide. Although her decision was never explained onscreen, a deleted scene from the episode Unfinished Business indicated Dee was aware of Lee's 'love and connection' with Kara Thrace.
- Romo Lampkin: Defense attorney (specifically a public defender) and protégé of Lee's grandfather Joseph (himself a public defender). Lampkin's approach in developing Gaius Baltar's defense intrigues Lee and causes him to become Lampkin's bodyguard. Later, Lampkin's philosophical prodding on the nature of justice, as well as stories about Joseph Adama's career and personality encourage Lee to resign from the Fleet and become the Caprican representative on the Quorum of Twelve.
- Gianne: Lee's fiancée from Caprica who presumably died during the Cylon attacks. Lee holds residual guilt for leaving her behind, and for running out on her when he found out she was pregnant with his child prior to the Cylon attacks.
- Shevon: A prostitute from Cloud 9 with whom Lee had relations. Lee tried to ease his guilt over what happened with Gianne by trying to save Shevon and her daughter Paya.
