= Battlestar Galactica season 4 =

Battlestar Galactica
- Season 4
- Season 4.0 DVD cover
- No. of episodes: 21

Release
- Original network: Sci-Fi Channel
- Original release: April 4, 2008 – March 20, 2009

Season chronology
- ← Previous; Season 3 Next → The Plan (TV movie)

The fourth and final season of the reimagined science fiction television series Battlestar Galactica premiered on the Sci-Fi Channel in the United States on April 4, 2008, and concluded on March 20, 2009. Similar to the second season, it was split into two parts, each containing 10 episodes. "Season 4.0" aired from April to June 2008 and "Season 4.5" aired from January to March 2009. The fourth season contained 20 episodes, plus the television film Razor.

== Cast and characters ==
=== Main cast ===
These actors are credited during the opening sequence:

- Edward James Olmos as William Adama
- Mary McDonnell as Laura Roslin
- Katee Sackhoff as Kara "Starbuck" Thrace
- Jamie Bamber as Lee "Apollo" Adama
- James Callis as Gaius Baltar
- Tricia Helfer as Number Six
- Grace Park as Sharon "Boomer" Valerii/Sharon "Athena" Agathon (Number Eight)

These actors are credited after the opening sequence:

- Michael Hogan as Saul Tigh
- Aaron Douglas as Galen Tyrol
- Tahmoh Penikett as Karl "Helo" Agathon
- Michael Trucco as Samuel Anders
- Alessandro Juliani as Felix Gaeta
- Kandyse McClure as Anastasia Dualla
- Nicki Clyne as Cally Henderson Tyrol (only in episode 3)

=== Recurring ===
- Rekha Sharma as Tory Foster
- Callum Keith Rennie as Leoben Conoy (Number Two)
- Rick Worthy as Simon (Number Four)
- Matthew Bennett as Aaron Doral (Number Five)
- Sebastian Spence as Noel "Narcho" Allison
- Dean Stockwell as John Cavil (Number One)
- Richard Hatch as Tom Zarek
- Donnelly Rhodes as Sherman Cottle
- Kate Vernon as Ellen Tigh
- Mark Sheppard as Romo Lampkin
- Lucy Lawless as D'Anna Biers (Number Three)
- Roark Critchlow as Slick
- Kerry Norton as Paramedic Laybe Ishay
- Lorena Gale as Priestess Elosha
- Leah Cairns as Margaret "Racetrack" Edmondson
- Bodie Olmos as Brendan "Hot Dog" Costanza
- Jennifer Halley as Diana "Hardball" Seelix

== Episodes ==
No. overall	No. in season	Title	Survivor count	Directed by	Written by	Original release date	U.S. viewers (millions)
Razor
54	0	Razor	49,579	Félix Enríquez Alcalá	Michael Taylor	November 24, 2007	1.72
55	0	Razor	49,579	Félix Enríquez Alcalá	Michael Taylor	November 24, 2007	1.72
A series of flashbacks reveals the chronicles of the Battlestar Pegasus and its crew from the initial Cylon attack on the Twelve Colonies, up to its meeting with Galactica, while Apollo's new XO deals with the harsh reality of Admiral Cain's legacy. Chronologically, this fits into Season 2 between the episodes "The Captain's Hand" and "Downloaded."
Season 4.0
56	1	"He That Believeth in Me"	39,698	Michael Rymer	Bradley Thompson & David Weddle	April 4, 2008	2.14
Starbuck returns to the Galactica and faces doubt from her former crew members as she tries to convince them she knows the way to Earth. Meanwhile Baltar takes up residence with a faction of his followers who believe he can save a young boy suffering from viral encephalitis.
57	2	"Six of One"	39,676	Anthony Hemingway	Michael Angeli	April 11, 2008	1.80
Starbuck faces the repercussions of her armed confrontation with President Roslin and loses the confidence of most of the crew. After learning the Final Five models are within the colonial fleet, a Number Six model named Natalie leads a coup within the Cylon hierarchy.
58	3	"The Ties That Bind"	39,676	Michael Nankin	Michael Taylor	April 18, 2008	1.74
While Starbuck commands a lone freighter in her desperate search for Earth, political intrigue and marital discord aboard the Galactica are paralleled by deep rifts in the Cylons' solidarity.
59	4	"Escape Velocity"	39,675	Edward James Olmos	Jane Espenson	April 25, 2008	N/A
Baltar's monotheistic cult activities expand, sparking political discord at the Quorum of Twelve, and possibly a religious civil war, while Colonel Tigh's mental state again becomes fragile.
60	5	"The Road Less Traveled"	39,676	Michael Rymer	Mark Verheiden	May 2, 2008	N/A
Starbuck faces mutiny on board the Demetrius when she expresses her intent in cooperating with the Cylon Leoben, who has boarded the ship to help her find Earth.
61	6	"Faith"	39,675	Michael Nankin	Seamus Kevin Fahey	May 9, 2008	N/A
Starbuck leads a mission to see the Cylon Hybrid who reveals more clues to finding Earth. On Galactica, President Roslin discusses religious faith with a dying woman named Emily.
62	7	"Guess What's Coming to Dinner?"	39,673	Wayne Rose	Michael Angeli	May 16, 2008	N/A
Bitter enemies must set aside their grudges as the Demetrius crew teams up with Cylon rebels to destroy a vital enemy target.
63	8	"Sine Qua Non"	39,674	Rod Hardy	Michael Taylor	May 27, 2008	N/A
In the aftermath of President Roslin's abduction, a bitter power struggle erupts which threatens to tear the once-ordered world of the colonial fleet apart.
64	9	"The Hub"	39,673	Paul Edwards	Jane Espenson	June 6, 2008	N/A
In pursuit of the enemy's Resurrection Hub, a team of Viper pilots and Cylon rebels become uneasy collaborators in formulating a battle plan.
65	10	"Revelations"	39,665	Michael Rymer	Bradley Thompson & David Weddle	June 13, 2008	1.80
D'Anna reveals that there are only four of the Final Five Cylons in the fleet and holds President Roslin hostage while attempting to lure the four out of hiding. After a dramatic entanglement, the humans and Cylons join together and arrive at Earth.
Season 4.5
66	11	"Sometimes a Great Notion"	39,651	Michael Nankin	Bradley Thompson & David Weddle	January 16, 2009	2.11
Earth is revealed to have been populated by Cylons until a nuclear war, 2000 years in the past. Starbuck tracks the homing signal and finds her own remains on the planet. The identity of the fifth of the Final Five Cylons is revealed. This episode is followed by ten The Face of the Enemy webisodes.
67	12	"A Disquiet Follows My Soul"	39,644	Ronald D. Moore	Ronald D. Moore	January 23, 2009	1.72
Laura Roslin begins to lose faith in the Pythian prophecy and her role as the dying leader. Tom Zarek intends to weaken the Human-Cylon alliance. Galen Tyrol is told that he is not the father of Cally's son.
68	13	"The Oath"	39,643	John Dahl	Mark Verheiden	January 30, 2009	1.56
Gaeta and Zarek start an uprising in the fleet, leaving the commanders of Galactica with a crucial choice.
69	14	"Blood on the Scales"	39,603	Wayne Rose	Michael Angeli	February 6, 2009	1.77
President Roslin faces off against Tom Zarek and Lt. Gaeta as they try to take control of the Colonial fleet. The alliance with the rebel Cylons as well as Adama's life are both at stake.
70	15	"No Exit"	39,556	Gwyneth Horder-Payton	Ryan Mottesheard	February 13, 2009	1.74
As Sam Anders recovers from surgery to dislodge the bullet in his brain, his memories of the Final Five Cylons re-emerge. Ellen Tigh resurrects aboard a Basestar, and reveals the part she played on Earth. With the Galactica losing structural integrity, Adama asks the newly reinstated Chief to fix the ship.
71	16	"Deadlock"	39,556	Robert Young	Jane Espenson	February 20, 2009	1.53
Galactica undergoes repairs using a Cylon substance that can help maintain the ship's structural integrity. With Boomer's help, Ellen Tigh escapes Cavil's ship and reunites with the fleet completing the gathering of the Final Five. Caprica Six miscarries Tigh's child, ending the hope that Cylons can reproduce with their own kind.
72	17	"Someone to Watch Over Me"	39,556	Michael Nankin	Bradley Thompson & David Weddle	February 27, 2009	1.66
Starbuck encounters a mysterious piano player in Joe's Bar and helps him work on his latest song. Realizing the musical notes match a series of dots drawn by Hera, Starbuck finishes the song which Col. Tigh and Tory Foster recognize as the music they heard when they learned they were Cylons. Tyrol unwittingly helps Boomer, who poses as Athena to kidnap Hera and take her to Cavil.
73	18	"Islanded in a Stream of Stars"	39,521	Edward James Olmos	Michael Taylor	March 6, 2009	1.57
Boomer's Raptor escape damages Galactica when she jumps too close to the hull. Admiral Adama makes the crucial decision to abandon ship and puts Lee in charge of offloading equipment to the rest of the fleet. As Starbuck searches for the meaning behind the "Cylon song" (revealed to be a rearrangement of "All Along the Watchtower", a real song from 1967), Baltar tries to expose her return from the dead as proof of life after death.
74	19	"Daybreak (Part 1)"	39,516	Michael Rymer	Ronald D. Moore	March 13, 2009	1.66
A series of pre-Cylon attack flashbacks delve into past situations of Caprica Six's involvement in caring for Baltar's elderly father, Roslin's sudden loss of her family in an accident, and Lee Adama's passionate feelings for Starbuck, who is dating his brother Zak. In the present, Anders reveals the location of Cavil's base and Adama decides to take Galactica on one final mission to rescue Hera.
75	20	"Daybreak (Part 2)"	39,406	Michael Rymer	Ronald D. Moore	March 20, 2009	2.36
76	21	"Daybreak (Part 3)"	39,406	Michael Rymer	Ronald D. Moore	March 20, 2009	2.36
Admiral Adama leads Galactica's final battle and rescues Hera from the Cylon Colony. Starbuck draws upon the meaning of Hera's musical notes to lead the fleet to a habitable world. The fate of the fleet and its relationship to modern day Earth is revealed.

== Production ==
During the hiatus after season 3, the writers had a retreat in Lake Tahoe where they planned much of the story arc for the fourth season, mainly mapping out the storylines of the first 10 episodes. In June 2007, the Sci-Fi Channel confirmed the fourth season would be its final season, with an order of 22 episodes, an increase from 13 as originally announced. Production of the final season began in May 2007. A special TV movie, titled Battlestar Galactica: Razor, aired on November 24, 2007. The regular season began airing on April 4, 2008.

Only the first 12 episodes of season four (including Razor, which is technically the first two episodes of the 22 ordered for season 4) were filmed before the 2007–2008 Writers Guild of America strike halted production of all scripted TV shows. After the strike ended, the final 10 episodes began airing on January 16, 2009.

== Reception ==
The season received universal acclaim from critics, scoring 85 out of 100 based on 16 reviews from Metacritic. On Rotten Tomatoes, the season has an approval rating of 92% with an average score of 8.1 out of 10 based on 38 reviews. The website's critical consensus reads, "Battlestar Galactica's final season proves a satisfying conclusion to TV's best science fiction offering." The series also placed on numerous critics top ten lists of both 2008 and 2009 by publications such as the Chicago Tribune, San Francisco Chronicle, The Star-Ledger, Time and TV Guide.

The fourth season received a total of eleven Emmy Award nominations. "Season 4.0" received six nominations at the 60th Primetime Emmy Awards, for Outstanding Writing for a Drama Series (Michael Angeli for "Six of One"), Outstanding Cinematography for a One-Hour Series (Stephen McNutt for Razor), Outstanding Single-Camera Picture Editing for a Drama Series ("He That Believeth in Me"), and Outstanding Sound Mixing for a Comedy or Drama Series (One-Hour) (Razor); and won for Outstanding Special Visual Effects for a Series ("He That Believeth in Me") and Outstanding Special Class – Short-Format Live-Action Entertainment Programs (Razor Flashbacks). "Season 4.5" received five nominations at the 61st Primetime Emmy Awards, with the episode "Daybreak, Part 2" receiving all the series' nominations, for Outstanding Directing for a Drama Series (Michael Rymer), Outstanding Single Camera Picture Editing for a Drama Series, Outstanding Sound Mixing for a Comedy or Drama Series (One Hour), and Outstanding Special Visual Effects for a Series; and won for Outstanding Sound Editing for a Series.

For the 10 regular episodes, Battlestar Galactica averaged a 1.7 Nielsen household rating and 2.2 million total viewers. This represented an increase of 13% in household rating and 11% in total viewers. The series finale received 2.4 million viewers and became the most-watched episode of the series in over three years.

== Home video releases ==
Similar to the second season, the fourth season was split into two parts, as well the DVD and Blu-ray sets. Season 4.0 was released on DVD in region 1 on January 6, 2009, in region 2 (although simply titled "Season 4") on October 6, 2008 and in region 4 (titled "Season 4: Part 1") on December 3, 2008. Season 4.5 was released on DVD in region 1 on July 28, 2009, in region 2 (titled "The Final Season") on June 1, 2009 and in region 4 (titled "Season 4: Part 2 – The Final Chapter") on July 28, 2009. The complete fourth season was released on Blu-ray Disc in region 1 on January 4, 2011.

The Season 4.0 DVD set includes the first 10 episodes of season four and the television film Razor. The Razor disc includes the broadcast version as well as the unrated extended version. Executive producer Ronald D. Moore and writer Michael Taylor provide commentary for the extended version. Also included on the Razor disc are deleted scenes, two featurettes—"The Look of Battlestar Galactica" and "My Favorite Episode So Far", as well as a sneak peek at season 4. For the other discs, special features include creator Ronald D. Moore's podcast commentaries on 7 of the 10 episodes; podcasts for "Guess What's Coming to Dinner?" and "Sine Qua Non" were not recorded, while a podcast for "Faith" was recorded and is available on the official website but is not included on the sets due to the recording quality. With that, new commentaries were recorded for the DVD. Moore, along with writers Bradley Thompson and David Weddle provide commentary for "Faith"; Moore and writer Michael Angeli provide commentary for "Guess What's Coming to Dinner?"; and Moore and writer Michael Taylor prove commentary for "Sine Qua Non". Moore is joined by writer Jane Espenson, editor Michael O'Halloran and supervising editor Andrew Seklir on his podcast commentary for "The Hub"; and is joined by writers Bradley Thompson and David Weddle, and editor Julius Ramsay on his podcast commentary for "Revelations". Also included are deleted scenes for every episode, ten David Eick videoblogs, three featurettes—"The Journey", "Cylons: The Twelve", and "The Music of Battlestar Galactica", as well as a sneak peek of season 4.5 and a trailer for Caprica.

The Season 4.5 DVD set includes the last 10 episodes of season four. Special features include creator Ronald D. Moore's podcast commentaries on all 10 episodes. There are also three unaired extended episodes, for "A Disquiet Follows My Soul", "Islanded in a Stream of Stars", and "Daybreak". The extended episodes feature commentary tracks; writer and director Ronald D. Moore on "A Disquiet Follows My Soul"; series star and episode director Edward James Olmos on "Islanded in a Stream of Stars"; and executive producers Ronald D. Moore and David Eick and director Michael Rymer on "Daybreak". Also included are deleted scenes for various episodes, 11 David Eick videoblogs, and five featurettes—"Evolution of a Cue", "And They Have a Plan", "The Journey Ends: The Arrival", "What the Frak is Going on With Battlestar Galactica?", and "A Look Back".
