= Islanded in a Stream of Stars =

- Battlestar Galactica episode
- Episode no.: Season 4 Episode 18
- Directed by: Edward James Olmos
- Written by: Michael Taylor
- Original air date: March 6, 2009

Guest appearances
- Kate Vernon as Ellen Tigh; Donnelly Rhodes as Doc Cottle; Rekha Sharma as Tory Foster; Dean Stockwell as Cavil

Episode chronology
← Previous "Someone to Watch Over Me"	Next → "Daybreak"
- Battlestar Galactica season 4

"Islanded in a Stream of Stars" is the eighteenth episode in the fourth season of the reimagined Battlestar Galactica. It aired on television in the United States and Canada on March 6, 2009. The survivor count shown in the title sequence is 39,521. The Region 1 DVD release of Season 4.5 includes an extended version of this episode.

== Plot ==
Repairs on Galactica continue, but the ship's systems are fluctuating, and a major hull breach kills 61 people, 26 of them Cylons.

Ellen Tigh states that if Cavil's plan is to study Hera and learn what made her a successful human-Cylon hybrid, he would take her to "The Colony", a large biomechanical structure similar in composition to the Basestars. Under protest, Adama allows a heavy raider to be sent to The Colony, not wanting to risk the whole fleet. In their room, Helo and Athena are distraught over the kidnapping of their daughter. Helo asks Adama for a Raptor so that he can go look for Hera, but Adama tells him that the Cylons have already reported back that the Colony has moved.

As Boomer plots several jumps to the Colony in order to deliver Hera to Cavil, Hera begins to whine and cry for her mother. Boomer grabs a needle with a sedative in it and threatens Hera with it, but finds herself unwilling to forcibly sedate her. Boomer begins to tell Hera about her dream home with Tyrol on Picon, revealing that it was, in fact, once her dream and not simply a ruse created to manipulate Galen Tyrol. Hera reaches for Boomer's hand and connects with her, allowing the girl to project the dwelling in Boomer's imagination. Boomer arrives at The Colony with Hera and delivers her to Cavil.

Gaius Baltar meets Kara Thrace in one of the ship's heads, where Kara tells him that she discovered her own body on Earth and asks him to analyze her dog tags. Baltar finds that blood on the tag matches Starbuck's DNA. At the burial of those lost in the hull breach, Baltar reveals what he has discovered and designates Starbuck an angel. Later, Apollo meets with Starbuck and offers her his unconditional love and support. Starbuck puts a photo of herself on the memorial wall of the dead.

Samuel Anders has been transferred to a hybrid tank in the hopes it would help him recover, but he remains comatose. Kara visits him and decides to shoot him as an act of mercy, but the still-comatose Sam grabs the gun and begins to speak like the hybrid. Arriving in Anders' room, Tigh is informed that Anders has gotten into the ship's programming. The Cylon biopolymer fluid which repair crews have painted upon Galactica's hull has made possible a connection between Anders' hybrid tank and Galactica's electrical systems. When the Eight states that it is theoretically possible for Anders to gain control of Galactica's FTL drive and jump away, Tigh orders that he be taken offline. Kara visits Sam and says they will work out the meaning of the song. She plugs Sam back in and he says, "new command".

Adama informs Tigh that he has made a decision: he plans to abandon the ship. Adama orders a stop to the repairs on the ship, and instructs the crew to begin stripping down Galactica, start offloading civilians, and transfer the crew and weapons to the basestar. When Tigh objects, Adama states that he can't blame Tigh for being what he is, especially when that includes being the best friend and XO he's ever had. But, that the ship is dying and he wants to send her off "in style". Adama and Tigh both salute the damaged Galactica with a drink as the episode ends.

== Production ==
Director Frank Darabont, helmer of the motion picture adaptations of The Shawshank Redemption and The Green Mile, as well as a major fan of the re-imagined Battlestar Galactica series, was originally slated to direct "Islanded in a Stream of Stars," but was forced to withdraw due to scheduling conflicts.

=== Deleted scenes ===
A number of scenes were omitted for time. There was at least one scene of Galen Tyrol in the brig, having confessed to his actions in the previous episode. An extended cut of the episode is available on the season 4.5 DVD.

== Reception ==
=== Ratings ===
"Islanded in a Stream of Stars" was seen by 1.568 million viewers (live viewing plus same day digital video recorder viewing), about 100,000 fewer viewers than for the previous episode.

=== Critical reviews ===
Alan Sepinwall of The Star-Ledger praised the performances, noting that "almost everyone went to some new, scarier places in this one." IGN's Eric Goldman felt the strongest part of the episode were the scenes between Boomer and Hera, praising Grace Park's performance as both Boomer and Athena. Goldman felt the scene in which Adama breaks down over the inevitable loss of Galactica "lacked as much weight as it seemed intended to have" but felt Islanded in a Stream of Stars was "a decent episode overall". Marc Bernardin of Entertainment Weekly felt the episode lacked cohesion, calling it a "collage of moments" though some of those moments were "lovely and heartbreaking and fantastic" and felt Tahmoh Penikett gave his best performance of the series. Paste's Michael Saba felt the scene between Adama and Roslin in the sickbay was a "surprisingly emotional moment" but that overall the episode was really "about setting up for the finale". The Chicago Tribune wrote that the episode "felt like an elegiac farewell" and particularly praised the performance given by Mary McDonnell. Alan Stanley Blair of Airlock Alpha felt that the storyline concerning Athena and Helo coping with the loss of Hera deserved more airtime but felt that Olmos gave both "fantastic acting and direction".
