= Shelley Godfrey =

Shelley Godfrey may refer to:

- Shelley Godfrey, a character in the television series Hemlock Grove (TV series)
- Shelly Godfrey see Number Six (Battlestar Galactica)
