= Daybreak (Battlestar Galactica) =

- Battlestar Galactica episodes
- The Galactica reaches the second Earth
- Episode nos.: Season 4 Episodes 19, 20 and 21
- Directed by: Michael Rymer
- Written by: Ronald D. Moore
- Original air dates: March 13, 2009 (Part 1); March 20, 2009 (Parts 2 & 3)
- Running time: 141 minutes (aired); 152 minutes (extended)

Guest appearances
- Callum Keith Rennie as Leoben; Kate Vernon as Ellen Tigh; Dean Stockwell as Cavil; Mark Sheppard as Romo Lampkin; Rick Worthy as Simon; Donnelly Rhodes as Doc Cottle; Matthew Bennett as Aaron Doral; Rekha Sharma as Tory Foster; Kerry Norton as Layne Ishay

Episode chronology
← Previous "Islanded in a Stream of Stars"	Next → The Plan
- Battlestar Galactica season 4

"Daybreak" is the three-part series finale of the reimagined science fiction television series Battlestar Galactica, and are the 74th (labeled "Daybreak, Part 1" on the DVD) and 75th (labeled "Daybreak, Parts 2 & 3" on the DVD) episodes overall. The episodes aired on the U.S. Sci Fi Channel and SPACE in Canada respectively on March 13 and March 20, 2009. The second part ("Daybreak, Parts 2 & 3") is double-length. The episodes were written by Ronald D. Moore, and directed by Michael Rymer. The Season 4.5 DVD and Blu-ray releases for Region 1 feature an extended version of the finale, which not only combines all three parts as a single episode, but also integrates it with new scenes not seen in the aired versions of either part. The survivor count shown in the title sequence for Part 1 is 39,516. The survivor count shown in the title sequence for Part 2 is 39,406. At the end of Part 2, Admiral Adama announces the survivor population at approximately 38,000.

The episodes portray the Galactica launching a rescue mission to retrieve Hera Agathon from the "colony", a heavily armed and defended Cylon base located near a black hole. They manage to rescue Hera and, in the end, the fleet finds a new planet to settle on, which they come to call Earth (revealed to be the actual Earth). The final episodes gave Battlestar Galactica the strongest ratings since its second season, though they received mixed reviews.

== Plot ==
=== Part 1 ===
The Galactica crew members and civilians divide themselves between those joining the rescue attempt, and those staying behind with the fleet.

The flashback sequences during the course of the first part take place a few years before the Cylon attack on Caprica. William Adama (Edward James Olmos) is reluctant to undergo a lie detector test in preparation for a civilian desk job. Elsewhere, Gaius Baltar (James Callis) is getting tired of his father, Julius, who is abusive to his nurse. However, Caprica Six (Tricia Helfer) soon informs Baltar that she took his father into a care home, where he will be happier. Laura Roslin (Mary McDonnell) is living happily with her two sisters, one of whom is pregnant. But later, Roslin receives distressing news that both her sisters and father were killed in a car accident. Three months after, she is set up for a blind date and is encouraged to join Mayor Adar's presidential campaign. Lee Adama (Jamie Bamber) meets Kara Thrace (Katee Sackhoff) for the first time while she is seeing his brother, Zak (Tobias Mehler). When Lee arrives home drunk, he notices a pigeon in his house, and he chases it away. Lastly, the flashbacks focus on Anders (Michael Trucco), who is interviewed during his sporting career, where he admits to playing for the joy of the pursuit of perfection rather than the winning.

Back in the present, Galactica is being stripped for parts to be used on other ships, while the military will be transferred to control the Rebel Basestar. The pictures of the fallen in the memorial hallway are also taken down. Baltar wants his people to have a seat on the quorum, but Lee refuses. Admiral Adama later decides to give amnesty to those who took part in the attempted coup d'état, as well as to Tyrol (Aaron Douglas), who is in the brig for helping Boomer (Grace Park) escape. This allows Tyrol to take part in the mission to retrieve Hera (Iliana Gomez-Martinez), who is being studied by the Cylons to determine how Cylons can reproduce. Adama announces a plan to rescue the child Hera at the colony and that it will be a one-way trip for the Galactica, and requires all Galactica personnel to either volunteer for the mission or decline in person. He and Starbuck lay a line down the center of the landing bay and personnel move to one side to volunteer or the other to remain with the Fleet. Doc Cottle (Donnelly Rhodes) attempts to join in, but is ordered back by Adama as the fleet cannot afford to lose a doctor. Several others join in the operation, including the original Cylon models, and a weakened Roslin. A Raptor is dispatched to the possible location of the "Colony", only to find it located very close to a black hole, but despite the circumstance, Adama orders an attack to begin and planning commences.

=== Part 2 ===
In flashback sequences, William Adama and Saul Tigh (Michael Hogan) celebrate their upcoming retirement, where Tigh convinces Adama to take his new job. Later, as Adama is questioned in an interview, he complains that no job is worth questioning his loyalty and decides to rejoin the military. Lee has dinner with Zak and Starbuck again. When Zak passes out, drunk, the sexual tension between Kara and Lee nearly erupts before they are interrupted by a stirring Zak. Back home, Lee again encounters the pigeon, but this time he does not chase it. Roslin meets her blind date, who happens to be a former student of hers. After spending the night together, she has second thoughts and ends the date; she then calls Adar's campaign, informing them of her intention to join it. Boomer meets Adama and Tigh for the first time, where she is warned that she is on the verge of ending her career due to her inability to land a Raptor. Given one last chance, Boomer gratefully tells the two that unlike other pilots, she will repay Adama one day. Meanwhile, Baltar, believing that Caprica Six is a corporate spy, allows her access to the military defense mainframe. He says that he is not doing this for her employers, but for her.

Back in the present of the series, Baltar decides to join the mission with Caprica Six at the last minute; she later admits to being proud of him for the first time. At that moment it is revealed that Baltar's "Head" Six and Six's "Head" Baltar are aware of each other, and the two real-life counterparts see both of them. Romo Lampkin (Mark Sheppard) is installed as president, and Hoshi (Brad Dryborough) is given command of the fleet while Adama and Galactica set off to rescue Hera. A battalion of the self-aware Cylon Centurions who are aligned with the fleet march down the flight deck – red stripes painted diagonally on their chests to distinguish them from the others.

Galactica jumps right next to the Colony, where they are immediately fired upon. Some of the Raptors, which are armed with nuclear weapons, make a short jump into the debris field and fly toward the back of the Colony; in the process, Racetrack (Leah Cairns) and Skulls (Collin Lawrence) are killed by an asteroid. Anders has been installed into the CIC computers, and disables the Colony-hybrids (Tiffany Lyndall-Knight). Starbuck's Raptor, carrying Athena and Helo, lands on the Colony – the only Raptor to make it through – and they enter to search for Hera. Galactica rams straight into the Colony, where a strike team led by Apollo rappels in from Galactica to search for Hera, eventually meeting with Starbuck's squad. Hera is rescued by Boomer, who kills Simon (Rick Worthy) and finds Starbuck's team. Boomer hands Hera over to Athena (Grace Park) and tells her to "tell the old man I owed him one." After her daughter is returned, Athena kills Boomer.

Galactica is set upon by Cylon boarding parties arriving in "platoon strength", as reported to Tigh and Adama in the CIC. As Starbuck, Apollo, Athena and Helo return to the battlestar and make their way to CIC, they encounter a boarding party composed of Cavil's modern Centurions and original Cylon War models. Hera runs away in the confusion. She is spotted by Roslin, who had a vision of her while assisting with triage, and is able to hide her from the Cylons, until she disappears again. While Roslin gives chase, Baltar and Caprica Six also spot Hera and give chase as well. The chase parallels the Opera House vision shared between Athena, Roslin and Caprica Six. The chase ends in the CIC, where Cavil (Dean Stockwell) takes her hostage and demands to leave with Hera so she can be dissected and establish a method for Cylons to reproduce. Inner Six and Inner Baltar again appear jointly to Baltar, inspiring him to make the speech his entire life has led to, saying, among other things, that he sees angels, and that a divine force ("whether God or Gods") has entwined the destinies of both sides. Tigh provides the final incentive, saying that the Final Five will give the Cylons back resurrection (a solution to the problem of Cylon extinction) if they vow to forever go separate ways from humanity and end their pursuit. Combined, this convinces Cavil and Adama to end the war, Cavil gives Hera back and will let them leave in peace when the Final Five give the technology for resurrection.

=== Part 3 ===
Cavil calls a cease fire in preparation for the data download and the boarding parties retreat. Roslin and Adama look on as the Final Five begin the download of the technology for resurrection, with Saul and Ellen Tigh (Kate Vernon), Tory Foster (Rekha Sharma) and Galen Tyrol (Aaron Douglas) dipping their hands into Samuel Anders' (Michael Trucco) tank to transfer the data to the Colony. Ellen warns that during the download they will briefly have full knowledge of each other's memories and experiences. Tory asks that all bygones be left bygones. The download commences and the Final Five experience flashbacks to each other's lives on Earth and in the colonies. Tyrol learns then that Tory murdered his wife, Cally, and kills her in revenge before the downloading is complete. Feeling betrayed, the Cylons resume fighting; after the other Cylons in CIC are killed, Cavil dies by suicide. At the same instant, a chance rock strike in the debris field causes Racetrack's dead hand to fall on the launch button for her Raptor's nuclear weapons, which were primed for launch before the Raptor's crew was lost. The missiles strike directly into the Colony, knocking it out of orbit. With Galactica still tangled in the Colony and being dragged toward the singularity along with it, Adama orders Starbuck to jump the ship away, anywhere. In a flash of inspiration, Starbuck mutters "there must be some kind of way out of here" and enters coordinates into the computer as if she were playing the mysterious music notes which Hera had written. Galactica jumps away and out of danger, leaving the Colony to fall to its destruction within the black hole. The war is over, and the Humans and their allies have prevailed.

Galactica arrives at Kara's mysterious coordinates, its final destination as the damage caused in the battle has rendered the ship incapable of surviving any further jumps. Miraculously, the Galactica finds itself in orbit around a moon, close to a habitable world: our own Earth.

Hours later, the rest of the fleet joins Galactica at this new world. Lee makes the unorthodox suggestion that they abandon their technology and start afresh, while Adama and others discover primitive humans already occupying the planet. Since finding Earth had always been the goal of the Colonial Fleet, Adama suggests they call this new planet "Earth." The survivors – Galactica's crew, the remaining inhabitants of the fleet, and the Cylon Twos, Sixes, and Eights – take basic supplies and spread out across the planet; not to colonize and impose cities like the Twelve Colonies of Kobol, but to blend in with primitive early humans, adding their own human and humanoid Cylon "genetics" to the early humans. Anders takes control of their abandoned fleet and pilots it into the Sun, so that the new arrivals "can give them the best part of ourselves ... not the baggage ... not the weapons ... our hearts (rather than) our science." The Rebel Cylons decide that their Centurions have earned their freedom, and give them control of the Basestar, which jumps away to parts unknown. Baltar and Caprica Six are visited by their Inner messengers, who inform them that their destinies – to save Hera – have been fulfilled, and the two decide to live out the rest of their lives together.

While resting under a tree, Roslin suddenly struggles to breathe. Adama quickly carries her aboard a Raptor, saying a brief but final goodbye to Lee and Starbuck before taking off. As they soar over the landscape, admiring the wildlife below and searching for a spot to build their cabin, Roslin passes away peacefully. Meanwhile, Lee shares his desire to explore the planet, embracing the unknown. With her destiny as an Angel fulfilled, Starbuck vanishes—disappearing without a trace while Lee's back is turned. Lee promises to never forget her. Tyrol decides to settle by himself on a remote northern island (implied to be the Scottish highlands). Helo (Tahmoh Penikett), Athena, and Hera are reunited as a family. Tigh and Ellen stay with the rest of the survivors. Adama eventually finds the place where he will build the cabin, and buries Laura on a nearby hillside.

=== Epilogue ===
New York City, 150,000 years later: humanity has reached the early 21st century, and the development of robotics and computerization continues unabated. Head Baltar and Head Six (no longer tied to the long-deceased Gaius Baltar and Caprica Six) comment on the recent discovery of what is believed to be "mitochondrial Eve" in Tanzania, the remains of Hera Agathon, progenitor of modern-day humanity. Head Six disagrees with her counterpart about humanity's next future: when a complex system repeats, something new is bound to happen, and this Earth—descendants of the abandoned planet Kobol, the planets of the Twelve Colonies of Kobol, and the original Earth may escape the vicious cycle of technology, surmising it to be a part of God's plan. Head Baltar reminds her, "It doesn't like that name," as the two stroll away. The episode and series end with a montage juxtaposing how we mistreat fellow humans alongside the progress of robotics in modern society, as the Jimi Hendrix song "All Along The Watchtower" plays.

== Production ==
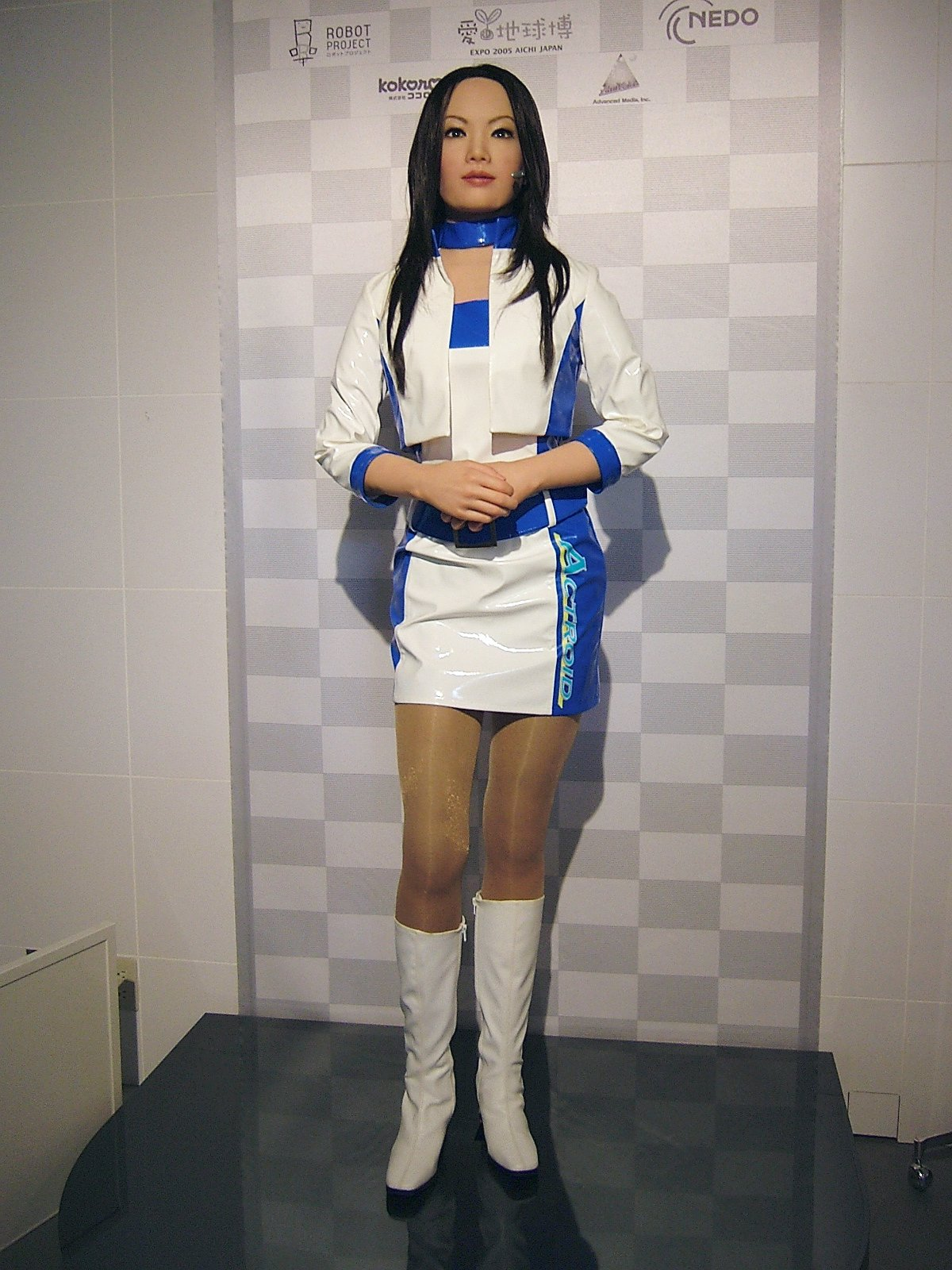
An Actroid at the Expo 2005 in Aichi, Japan. Footage from the Expo was featured in the episode's epilogue.

In the episode's podcast, Moore and his wife Terry commented that they had trouble scouring for robot footage and clearing rights-issues. They also described one of the robots as the "most disturbing" of the bunch. "She's freaky. She's a Six in the making".

Several cues from Stu Phillips' original Battlestar Galactica theme are heard at several junctions in the show, including when Adama flies the last Viper off the Galactica, and when Anders flies the fleet into the Sun. The final shot of the fleet leaving Earth's orbit is an exact recreation of the fleet stock shot from the original series. D'Anna Biers (played by Lucy Lawless) is the only Cylon not to appear in this episode, as her character had stayed on the original Cylon Earth at the end of "Sometimes a Great Notion".

Before entering coordinates on the FTL-drive control console, Starbuck says "[There] must be some kind of way out of here", which is the opening line of Bob Dylan's song "All Along the Watchtower". The coordinates she enters are revealed through flashbacks to be the numerical representation of the opening notes of that same tune. The song is a recurring motif throughout the fourth season, and the version sung by Jimi Hendrix is played at the end of the episode.

The episode was partially shot in the area of Kamloops, British Columbia, Canada. The original rough cut of the episode (all three parts) ran over four hours long.

Show creator Ronald D. Moore appears in a short cameo in the epilogue, as the long-haired man reading the fictional edition of National Geographic magazine in which the archaeological story is featured.

== Reception ==
"Daybreak (Part 2)" was watched by 2.4 million total viewers, a 56% surge from the season three finale and the series' best numbers since the season 2.5 premiere, "Resurrection Ship, Part 1". This led to a 1.7 household rating. The series finale also drew 1.5 million viewers in the key 18-to-49-year-old demographic, and 1.6 million viewers aged 25-to-54, the best in each demographic since "Resurrection Ship, Part 2". The numbers do not take into account timeshifting via digital video recorders, which typically adds another 700,000 Battlestar Galactica viewers per episode.

Critical reception of the finale varied. Alan Sepinwall of The Star Ledger wrote "so the amazing four-year journey of Battlestar Galactica comes to an end, and I feel very, very good about it – even as I suspect others may not." Mary McNamara of the Los Angeles Times praised Moore and the writing team for "not copping out" and commented that it was "hard to imagine a more visually and thematically satisfying finale". Richard Vine of The Guardian opined that "somehow, out of all the doom and gloom, death, destruction and nihilism we've had, Battlestar Galactica finished with something approaching a happy ending." He concluded that the episode was ultimately satisfying, noting that "most of the major questions were dealt with in some form or another." Emily St. James, writing for Slant Magazine, said that "outside of a few small moments, I found [the series finale] pretty tremendous, first a fittingly epic action ending and then a sweet and enigmatic series of character endings."

Mother Jones magazine noted that the finale did little to genuinely resolve many plotlines and subplots, and pondered the implications for the industry. Mark Perigard of the Boston Herald concluded that "The desire to wrap everything up in a neat package–which is so contrary to the spirit of this show–hobbled the series creators." Salon.com contrasted the finale with the rest of the series noting that the episode finished with "40 minutes of speeches about lessons learned and the need to 'break the cycle', the naiveté of which did indeed feel like a break— from the knowing, worldly stoicism that made Battlestar Galactica so refreshing to begin with." Time magazine noted that it seemed hard to believe that an advanced culture would discard all of its technology.

Fantasy author George R.R. Martin expressed his dissatisfaction, commenting:

Battlestar Galactica ends with 'God Did It.' Looks like somebody skipped Writing 101, when you learn that a deus ex machina is a crappy way to end a story. Yeah, yeah, sometimes the journey is its own reward. I certainly enjoyed much of the journey with BSG. But damn it, doesn't anybody know how to write an ending any more? Writing 101, kids. Adam and Eve, God Did It, It Was All a Dream? I've seen Clarion students left stunned and bleeding for turning in stories with those endings.

Josh Tyler of CinemaBlend concluded that the final resolution lacked credibility, but that the simple drama of the episode was one reason to view it positively.
