= Tigh =

Tigh may refer to:

- Tígh, an Irish term referring to a house or residence such as tigh dubh which translates as blackhouse
- Colonel Tigh, a character in the 1978–79 television series Battlestar Galactica
- Colonel Saul Tigh, a character in the 2004 reboot of Battlestar Galactica
  - Ellen Tigh, the wife of Saul Tigh in the 2004 series
