= Escape Velocity (Battlestar Galactica) =

- Battlestar Galactica episode
- Episode no.: Season 4 Episode 4
- Directed by: Edward James Olmos
- Written by: Jane Espenson
- Original air date: April 25, 2008

Episode chronology
← Previous "The Ties That Bind"	Next → "The Road Less Traveled"
- Battlestar Galactica season 4

"Escape Velocity" is the fourth episode in the fourth season of the science fiction television series Battlestar Galactica. It first aired on April 25, 2008. The survivor count shown in the title sequence is 39,675.

== Plot ==
Chief Galen Tyrol holds a memorial service for his late wife Cally. As it concludes, Tory Foster tries to convey her condolences to him.

Colonel Tigh and Tory later meet the Chief in his quarters. There, he confesses that he is still confused by his Cylon identity, but Tory tries to persuade him that he is perfect and that they are superior to humans. She suggests that he "switch off" his guilt, but Tigh vehemently disagrees saying that grief is human.

Tory then visits Gaius Baltar in his sect's quarters. As she seduces him while bringing him pain, a group of masked men break in, launch tear gas, deface Baltar's shrine and beat up anyone they can find. They demand Baltar surrender himself, but he hides in his alcove. The intruders flee when security arrives. After the attack, Baltar comforts an older woman who is praying to Asclepius, a god of healing.

An investigation is launched and Six tells Baltar that the attackers are known as "The Sons of Ares" – a religious sect opposed to Baltar's monotheistic teachings. "Head Six" appears to him and says that it seems "the old gods are fighting back." She encourages Baltar to coordinate a counter-attack. Later, Baltar and his followers break into a polytheistic religious ceremony to denounce the old gods. Baltar declares that people are not being told the truth and begins defacing the temple, crushing the items on the altar and denouncing the priestess as a witch. Security personnel arrest him before a riot starts.

In Galactica's sick bay, Adama meets Roslin, bringing a novel to read aloud during her cancer treatment.

Down in the brig, Colonel Tigh pays a visit to Caprica Six and asks how she can cope with her guilt in the deaths of billions of human beings. He then hallucinates, seeing his dead wife Ellen Tigh in her place and he fearfully leaves.

On Colonial One, the Quorum meets where Lee Adama challenges President Roslin's latest emergency decree, in response to the religious attacks, which restricts assemblies to twelve people or fewer. Roslin assures him that the decree is aimed squarely at Gaius Baltar and his monotheistic sect, but the other Quorum members argue that the decree could be applied to many polytheistic believers as well, whose beliefs approximate parts of Baltar's religion. An angry Roslin challenges the Quorum to override her decree, while reminding them of what happened when Baltar was President and warning them of what might happen if he were to obtain significant religious influence.

On Galactica, Tyrol returns to work, but remains distracted. He clears Racetrack's Raptor for flight, but the ship soon suffers an explosion and is forced into an emergency crash-landing. Although Racetrack and her ECO Skulls escape injury, the Raptor is destroyed. An inspection reveals that Tyrol failed to swap a damaged part for the replacement he was carrying at the time. Racetrack tries to drop the matter saying that nobody was hurt—"It was human error"—but Tyrol becomes furious and challenges any of the witnesses to face him and say that he "frakked" up.

Distraught over the incident, Tyrol sits alone in Joe's Bar. Adama arrives and tries to console him over the death of Cally; Tyrol hallucinates and hears Adama call Cally a Cylon-lover who birthed a half-breed abomination, but really he had said that Cally was a good person. Tyrol becomes enraged, insulting Cally and denouncing her as second-best. He says that the one who he really loved was Boomer, but she turned out to be a Cylon. Adama insists he heard enough from the Chief and tells him to end his outburst, but Tyrol turns his tirade against Adama himself and the Galactica and challenges Adama to demote him. Adama dismisses Tyrol from Deck Crew Chief of Galactica with rank demotion to Specialist, then commands him to appear for a duty reassignment the following morning. He leaves a stressed, despondent Chief behind at the bar.

Later, Roslin visits Baltar in the brig where she tells him that she doesn't have long to live and warns that her impending death has left her willing to act outside of the law and conventional morality. She tells Baltar of the effects that her treatment is having on her and threatens him not to disturb the peace. She is tired of indulging him, but to his surprise has him released.

Meanwhile, Colonel Tigh visits Caprica Six once again but he continues to see the visage of Ellen in her place. He orders the guards and observation crew away and turns off the surveillance cameras. He then repeats his earlier question of guilt to Six who says that humankind learns from pain and needs pain to achieve clarity, as she has learned from her own pain. She removes Tigh's eye-patch, but after a moment of indulging in "Ellen's" touch, he pushes her away with insults. She responds by savagely beating him down to the floor, then questions if he can sense the clarity; a bloodied Tigh asks for more pain. She admits that it appears that she was wrong about his needs and starts kissing him instead.

At the sect's quarters, Baltar and several members are barred from entry to their home by a guard at the door who says he is enforcing Roslin's emergency decree against assembly. Head Six appears to Baltar and tells him he will not be harmed if he continues on. Baltar then attempts to pass but is beaten down by the soldier. Bleeding and kneeling on the floor, Baltar whispers that he cannot continue, but Head Six orders him to his feet. She then forcibly pulls him upright and Gaius appears to be physically lifted by an unseen force. The surprised guard again knocks him to the floor, while his acolytes all the more convinced by his divinity. Lee Adama then arrives and declares that the Quorum has overturned Roslin's decree and that the people are free to assemble as they please. In his quarters, Baltar delivers a lengthy, inspired speech. He declares that his monotheistic followers contain the spark of God inside them and that they must learn to love themselves before they can begin to love each other.

As the speech continues, the scene briefly moves to the Demetrius, where Starbuck has fallen asleep atop her navigation charts. A concerned Samuel Anders enters the room and stares at her.

Back on Galactica, Baltar concludes by telling his followers that since God loves them, they must therefore be perfect as they are. The followers, most moved to tears, cheer encouragingly. Tory Foster stands in the rear of the room. Head Six is next to her, observing her. Lee Adama stands further back, listening uneasily at Baltar's rising influence.

== Production ==
In the original draft for the beginning of season four, Tom Zarek was behind the Sons of Ares and encouraged its attack on Baltar's Cult.
