= No Exit (Battlestar Galactica) =

- Battlestar Galactica episode
- Ellen Tigh after resurrecting on a Cylon basestar
- Episode no.: Season 4 Episode 15
- Directed by: Gwyneth Horder-Payton
- Written by: Ryan Mottesheard
- Original air date: February 13, 2009

Guest appearances
- Kate Vernon as Ellen Tigh; Donnelly Rhodes as Dr. Cottle; Rekha Sharma as Tory Foster; Dean Stockwell as John Cavil; John Hodgman as Dr. Gerard

Episode chronology
← Previous "Blood on the Scales"	Next → "Deadlock"
- Battlestar Galactica season 4

"No Exit" is the fifteenth episode in the fourth season of the reimagined Battlestar Galactica. It aired on television in the United States and Canada on February 13, 2009. The survivor count shown in the title sequence is 39,556. This episode contains the first use of the term "The Colony."

== Plot ==
In a flashback to the Cylon occupation of New Caprica, it is revealed that Ellen Tigh was resurrected in the Cylon fleet after Saul poisoned her. Her resurrection restores all of Ellen's memories. Ellen tries to persuade Cavil to stop chasing the humans, but he refuses. Ellen refers to Cavil as John, his model's original name. It is revealed that he was modeled after Ellen's father.

On board the Galactica, Tyrol shows Admiral Adama the damage to the ship's hull he discovered, and warns the ship may not survive another jump without repair. Tyrol indicates that when Galactica was built, corners were cut, compromising its integrity. Also, the ship has taken battle damage as well as the jump into New Caprica's atmosphere. Adama reinstates Tyrol to Chief, and asks him to fix the ship, insisting on the repair crew being all human. By performing a special type of inspection, Tyrol discovers fractures throughout the bulkheads that cannot be easily repaired, and recommends an organic Cylon compound, which Adama refuses.

As a side-effect of the bullet still lodged in his brain, Samuel Anders is able to recover memories of the complete origin and purpose of the Final Five. Three others of the Final Five and Kara Thrace gather around his bedside, begging for him to be kept out of surgery until he can finish explaining. Anders says that the Cylons, which were the thirteenth tribe of Kobol, began procreating naturally on Earth and finally lost resurrection technology. Anders and the other Final Five were researchers who worked on reinventing the ancient technology.

On Colonial One, Lee Adama proposes assembling a new Quorum. He says it should reflect the current times, representing the ships in the fleet rather than the old 12 colonies. Laura Roslin agrees, and tells him to assemble the new Quorum himself. She says she will remain as president in title, with Lee assuming the responsibilities of the office. She says her only reservation about him is that he sometimes does what is right, rather than what is smart.

In the infirmary, Sam continues his explanation. The Final Five re-developed the ancient resurrection process, and created a resurrection ship in orbit around Earth. When nuclear war destroyed the Earth Colony, the Final Five were killed but resurrected on the ship. They made their way to the planets of the Twelve Colonies of Kobol, with the intention of warning the humans against repeating old mistakes and provoking another war with Centurions. They lacked faster-than-light technology, so they traveled at speeds near, but below, the speed of light. In accordance with the theory of relativity, due to time dilation only a short time passed for them, while thousands of years passed for the rest of the universe. They arrived only to find that the other Colonies were already engulfed in (the first) war with their own Cylon Centurions.

The Centurions had already created the hybrid models, but nothing that could survive on its own. The Five offered to help the Centurions if, in exchange, they ended the war. The Five gave them resurrection technology and created eight humanoid models, although the fleet previously only knew of the existence of seven of them. Kara asks Sam about the eighth Cylon, designated Number Seven, thinking it might be her, but Sam tells her that it was a male named Daniel.

In another flashback, Ellen tells Cavil that she knows he killed all the Daniels, because Cavil was jealous of them. Cavil responded that the Daniels "didn't thrive." Cavil shows her images of the temple on the algae planet. Ellen says the temple wasn't her invention. It was created by the thirteenth tribe on their way from Kobol to Earth. Cavil mentions that D'Anna saw the faces of the Five in that temple, and Ellen says that was not because of anything she did. She suggested it was an act of the "One God." Cavil is resentful that the Five gave him human weaknesses. Ellen realizes that he sent the Five to live among the humans because he wanted them to suffer. Boomer asks Ellen if she feels remorse for what she did for the Cylons. She replies that she does not, because what she did was a good thing. She gave them free will and the ability to feel compassion.

Sam's doctors insist that the surgery cannot wait anymore, and they start the surgery before he's finished explaining everything. As he is being wheeled into the operating theater, he urges Saul Tigh to stay with the fleet.

In yet another flashback, Cavil informs Ellen about the destruction of the Resurrection Hub by the humans and the rebel Cylons and tells her that she will have to recreate the resurrection technology for them. She claims that she will need the other Final Five in order to do this, however Cavil does not believe her. He tells her that if she doesn't give him the information, he'll extract the information from her brain using a psychophysical process.

In a flashback to two days ago, Boomer comes to Ellen, supposedly to escort her to the surgery. Ellen tells her that she should have brought a tumbrel, implying that Cavil's procedure is some form of punishment or execution. Boomer leads Ellen to a captured Raptor, saying she is forgiving her. They escape the basestar and then jump away.

Sam comes out of surgery and Starbuck tries to talk to him, but paramedic Ishay points out on the monitor that he has almost no brain function.

In his room, Adama notices large cracks in the bulkheads, and finally relents, calling Tyrol and telling him to do whatever it takes to save the ship.

== Ratings ==
"No Exit" was seen by 1.738 million viewers (live viewing plus same day digital video recorder viewing).

== Critical reception ==
Alan Sepinwall of The Star-Ledger noted that the episode was largely an info-dump but praised the performances and the major thematic element of denial found throughout the episode. Maureen Ryan of the Chicago Tribune felt that the information dump was "handled about as gracefully as it could be". She stated that Kate Vernon "was terrific as the most commanding and shrewd Ellen we've ever seen" and also enjoyed Dean Stockwell's performance - "seeing him tap into Cavil's rage, resentment and condescension was a treat."
