= Six Degrees of Separation (Battlestar Galactica) =

- Battlestar Galactica episode
- Episode no.: Season 1 Episode 7
- Directed by: Robert M. Young
- Written by: Michael Angeli
- Original air dates: November 29, 2004 (UK); February 18, 2005 (US)

Episode chronology
| ← Previous "Litmus" | Next → "Flesh and Bone" |
- Battlestar Galactica season 1

"Six Degrees of Separation" is the seventh episode of the reimagined Battlestar Galactica television series.

== Plot ==
=== In the fleet ===
While conversing with his internal Six in his mental version of his house, Baltar dismisses the existence of God. Six, appearing hurt, then disappears from Baltar's mind. Moments after Six disappears, Baltar is called to the CIC where he learns that a woman named Shelly Godfrey is accusing him of being a Cylon collaborator. Shelly has the form of Six, but the entire CIC crew can see her to Baltar's shock. Shelly claims to be a systems analyst from the Defense Ministry who worked closely with Doctor Amarak. Shelly provides a photograph of a man entering the defense mainframe with an explosive charge that she claims is Baltar. Shelly's story is that Amarak gave it to her shortly before his death when the Olympic Carrier was destroyed. The picture contains a reflection of the saboteur and Lieutenant Felix Gaeta is assigned to clean up the image while Baltar's work on the Cylon detector and security clearance is suspended.

Baltar begins desperately trying to convince people that he is innocent and that Shelly is a Cylon agent out to discredit him because of his work on the Cylon detector. Baltar has no luck though Commander Adama becomes suspicious of Shelly when she tries to seduce him when Adama questions her story. In response, Adama has Shelly followed at all times by the marines. During this time, Baltar seeks his internal Six for help, only to find that she has completely vanished from his mind. At one point, Baltar tries to convince Gaeta in the head to believe him before assaulting Shelly.

In a desperate attempt to exonerate himself, Baltar distracts Gaeta with a fire alarm and attempts to destroy the damning photograph which Gaeta has managed to clean up, revealing Baltar's face. Baltar fails and is arrested for treason and finds no help even from President Roslin. Finally, Baltar prays to God for help and his Six returns to his side. Shortly afterwards, Gaeta returns with proof that the photograph was a fake and Baltar is exonerated. Gaeta notes that it was almost too easy to find the forgery, suggesting that Shelly wanted to be found out. Shelly has also completely disappeared with no trace of where she went.

At the same time that Baltar is being investigated, Chief Tyrol struggles to figure out Starbuck's captured Cylon Raider. While trying to help Tyrol, Boomer shows a disturbing affection for the Raider and later finds the word Cylon written on her mirror, panicking Boomer further due to her growing suspicions that she is a Cylon. Starbuck, after resisting physical therapy for her injured knee, is motivated to help Tyrol by a visit from Colonel Tigh and is able to once more get the Raider operating.

In the end, Roslin, who had a brief health scare due to overdosing on her cancer medication, publicly exonerates Baltar while exposing Shelly as a Cylon agent to the fleet. Baltar is left wondering if Shelly Godfrey actually ever existed or if she was just a manifestation of his internal Six meant to bolster his reputation. However, Six doesn't clarify the matter.

=== On Caprica ===
Twenty four days after being stranded on Caprica, Helo and Sharon flee through a forest pursued by two Cylon Centurions. After stopping for the night, Helo admits his love for Boomer, telling Sharon that he had always respected her relationship with Chief Tyrol but had wanted to be the one with her. The two subsequently make love during a thunderstorm with Helo not noticing Sharon's spine glowing red.

== Notes ==
- While the episode leaves the true nature of Shelly Godfrey open to speculation, the telemovie Battlestar Galactica: The Plan reveals the truth. The Plan shows that Shelly was actually a Cylon agent sent by John Cavil to discredit Baltar and his Cylon detector project. It's also implied that Shelly made it easy to find out the truth due to feelings for Baltar. Her disappearance is revealed to have been orchestrated by Cavil and another Six which ended with Cavil airlocking Shelly.
- During the episode, Boomer finds the word Cylon written on her mirror. While it isn't clear who put it there, in The Plan Boomer's Cylon personality suggests that she did it in an attempt to warn Boomer of what she was so that Boomer would stop her.
