= Ellen Tigh =

Fictional character in Battlestar Galactica (2004)

- Battlestar Galactica character
- Kate Vernon as Ellen Tigh
- First appearance: "Tigh Me Up, Tigh Me Down" (2004)
- Last appearance: Battlestar Galactica: The Plan (2009)
- Portrayed by: Kate Vernon

In-universe information
- Species: Humanoid Cylon
- Gender: Female
- Affiliation: Final Five Cylons
- Spouse: Saul Tigh

Ellen Tigh is a fictional character from the 2004 Battlestar Galactica reboot series, portrayed by Kate Vernon from 2004 to 2009. She is the manipulative wife of series regular Colonel Saul Tigh (Michael Hogan) during the first three seasons of the series. In season four, she is revealed to be the last of the Final Five Cylons, synthetic humanoid machines who are the precursors to the Cylon antagonists who oppose the human race throughout much of the series.

== Appearances ==
The reimagined Battlestar Galactica debuted on Sky One in the United Kingdom on October 18, 2004, and on the Sci-Fi Channel in the United States on January 14, 2005. Vernon first appeared on December 13, 2004, in the ninth episode of season one, "Tigh Me Up, Tigh Me Down", as the wife of series regular Colonel Saul Tigh (Michael Hogan). Her character was killed off in season three, and at the time series creator Ronald D. Moore assured Vernon there was no way for her to come back. She was subsequently surprised to be asked to return in season four, and kept the secret that Ellen was the final Cylon for two years. Vernon remained on the series until its final episode, "Daybreak", on March 20, 2009. Vernon reprised the role in the television film Battlestar Galactica: The Plan, which was released digitally on October 27, 2009, and first broadcast on SyFy on January 10, 2010.

== Characterization ==
=== Early seasons ===
Ellen is introduced as the beautiful but troublesome wife of the gruff Colonel Saul Tigh, XO of the Battlestar Galactica and second-in-command to its captain, Commander William Adama (Edward James Olmos). Ellen is well known to Adama, Saul's longtime friend, who notes that she was rumored to have "slept with more than half the fleet while Saul was in space", and believes that Ellen encourages Tigh's worst instincts and brings out his self-destructive streak. Tigh's reunion with Ellen, and its inherent pressures, fuels his alcohol abuse. She has been described as "hard-drinking, attention-seeking and promiscuous", but devoted to Tigh despite her selfishness. Ellen is an attractive woman who unapologetically uses her sexuality to get what she wants for herself and her husband. Ellen has been described as the Lady Macbeth of the series in that she believes her husband should command more respect and power, and she has spent years manipulating him and other men to get it.

In season two, Tigh is forced to take command of Galactica and the fleet when Adama is incapacitated. Ellen recognizes her husband's limitations and attempts to both guide and push him to action. Moore noted that though Tigh is an effective leader during a military crisis, he is otherwise hampered by his lack of political skill, his alcoholism and Ellen's manipulation. Moore explained that her manipulation is both conscious and unconscious, and that she reacts to her husband's weakness by attacking. Maurice Molyneaux of Slashfilm noted that Ellen constantly tears Saul down even as she builds him up. Vernon said, "She is deeply in love with Saul and all she wants is her man. But she's been in competition with Adama from the get go and that's one hell of a fight. Ellen and Saul are cut from the same cloth, they are inseparable really".

In season three, Ellen proves willing to do anything to guarantee Tigh's continued safety. She performs sexual favors for one of the Cylon Cavil (Dean Stockwell) models to effect Tigh's release from a Cylon detention center where he is treated roughly, and betrays the human Resistance to Cavil when he threatens Tigh's life. When her duplicity is revealed in "Exodus", Tigh chooses to execute her himself rather than let a less sympathetic member of the Resistance do it. Zack Handlen of The A.V. Club wrote of Ellen's death, "It's a tragic, heartbreaking end to a character who, for most of her time on the series, had been little more than an irritant. Her time on New Caprica allowed the writers to clarify what made her more than just a twerp: her unshakable devotion to her husband was at once her redemption and her doom. After [Saul] learns the truth, that Ellen betrayed them to the Cylons, she tries to explain herself—and what's so painful to watch is that you can't really fault her reasoning. She did what she thought was necessary, not for the greater good but to protect this one thing in her life". Describing the situation surrounding Ellen's death as "Tigh's best moment of character development", Craig Elvy of Screen Rant lamented that it was rendered meaningless by her resurrection in season four.

=== The Final Five ===
In the series, a race of sentient machines called Cylons launch a cataclysmic attack on human civilization that kills billions, and subsequently pursue the fleeing 50,000 survivors to exterminate them completely. Biological models of Cylons, indistinguishable from humans, have infiltrated what remains of the human population, and their identities are revealed over the course of the series. There are a finite number of distinct models, but each model can have multiple copies, which share biology and general personality throughout their model but develop into distinct individuals. The synthetic biological Cylons can be harmed and killed in the same manner as humans, but each copy can be resurrected by downloading their digital consciousness into a new body. Multiple copies of seven distinct Cylon models are depicted in the first three seasons, followed by the revelation that a "fundamentally different" group, dubbed the "Final Five" Cylons, are also embedded in the human fleet. Four of the Final Five are revealed in the season three finale, "Crossroads", including Tigh himself. Ellen is revealed as the last one in the season four episode "Sometimes a Great Notion", and her resurrection and self-realization are depicted in the episode "No Exit".

Vernon said, "When they killed me off, I went up to Ron [Moore] and I looked him straight in the eyes and I said, 'Isn't there any way I can come back?' And he just looked at me very gently and assuredly said, 'No'." Moore believed he was telling the truth until season four, when he and his writing team were debating the identity of the final Cylon. He said, "Ellen's name was kicking around the office. It worked primarily because of her relationship with Tigh. It really sort of anchored that couple as something that was very special. It also made the fact that Tigh had killed his wife back on New Caprica even richer and more complicated and filled with more ironies." According to Moore, the concept of Ellen and Saul Tigh's relationship being more than an average husband-and-wife relationship went back to the pilot miniseries, but was not made part of the story arc for the two characters until the middle of season three. As writing progressed on the episode "Torn," the writing staff needed to explain why Gaius Baltar (James Callis) would only see the seven known Cylon models aboard the Cylon Basestar rather than all twelve. Moore came up with the concept of five special Cylon models that had yet to be revealed. When one of the Final Five Cylons was revealed to be Saul, Moore finally decided to make Ellen the fifth Cylon because "Tigh being revealed as a Cylon was such a profound shift in that character, such a big leap for the show, that it felt really natural that she was also a Cylon." Moore said, "They've always been Cylons, and there's something profound about that. They're a married couple who just have to go at it periodically and just have major issues and major problems. But the bond between the two of them was something that literally could not be broken. And I thought that was a really interesting and ultimately very positive thing to say." The couple has been described as Shakespearean “Battlestar-crossed lovers", and Vernon quipped that they "have the longest-standing relationship in the universe."

In 2009, Vernon said that Ellen was the most interesting, complex character she had played in her 25-year career. Jed Gottlieb of the Boston Herald wrote, "Ellen has proved to be a much more complex character than anyone ever imagined." Vernon had previously felt that Ellen was undervalued, underappreciated and underestimated, and said of the character after the reveal, "There is so much more to Ellen than her need for power... There's a depth to Ellen. Her heart is much bigger than anyone realized. People like to minimize her as a bitch, but I say she was just misunderstood. ... Ellen wants harmony in the fleet — she wants peace. That's her overall goal." Vernon said of Ellen in season four, "The Lady Macbeth scenario has seen it's day ... she's much more realized now in terms of who she is. And with that she carries an important agenda and an important intention." In "No Exit", Ellen makes the case to fellow Cylons Cavil and Sharon Valerii (Grace Park) that the value of humans is their ability to love, adapt, feel emotion, show compassion and be creative. She argues that Cylons have been programmed with the capacity for all these things, and must just choose to embrace them. Molyneaux noted of Ellen, "In the end, she's key to breaking the cycle of conflict with the Cylons."

Molyneaux wrote that even with her Cylon memories restored, "all versions of Ellen are consistent". and Maureen Ryan of the Chicago Tribune concurred that "the two Ellens—the cool Cylon version and the impetuous human version—basically have the same programming." Several reviewers praised the elevated version of Ellen introduced in "No Exit", who is depicted as shrewd and commanding, yet compassionate, while noting that some of her core character flaws emerge in the next episode, "Deadlock". Marc Bernardin of Entertainment Weekly wrote, "It felt like Ellen was waging a tiny war within herself, fighting between the lesser angels and greater demons of her nature. Between her "duty" as the matriarch of the Final Five, and her unholy desire to wreak havoc on Tigh ... she forces Tigh into an impossible choice, between Ellen and Caprica [Six]; between duty and desire, between who he is and what he is ... Ellen is the poison apple." Ryan wrote, "The Ellen in ['Deadlock'] seemed more like the old Ellen we used to know—the Ellen who likes a drink, likes to make trouble and usually overplays her hand." Jevon Phillips of the Los Angeles Times was less impressed by Ellen Tigh's characterization, calling her "annoying" and the change from the "cool character" of the previous episode "disconcerting". Alan Sepinwall of The Star-Ledger explained, "This episode makes clear that Cavil didn't invent entirely new personalities for his 'parents' when he imprisoned them in new bodies. The real version of Ellen is smarter than the one we knew, and maybe more regal, but she's still just as frakked-up, just as trapped in the ring of fire with Saul as she ever was."

== Storyline ==
=== Season one ===
In "Tigh Me Up, Tigh Me Down", Commander William Adama returns from a mysterious off-ship errand, accompanied by Colonel Saul Tigh's wife, Ellen, who Tigh assumed had been killed in the devastating Cylon attacks on the Twelve Colonies. Ellen explains that she was at the airport on Picon when the Cylons attacked, and after being knocked unconscious, was rescued by a stranger. She has no memory of the intervening weeks, during which time she was nursed back to health on another ship, the Rising Star. Suspicious of Ellen's sudden reappearance, Adama tasks Dr. Gaius Baltar (James Callis) to submit her blood sample to his newly-invented Cylon detection test. Though it is clear to President Laura Roslin (Mary McDonnell) that Tigh loves Ellen deeply, Adama laments that Ellen has always been a bad influence on Tigh, bringing out his self-destructive qualities. Both drunk, Tigh is annoyed when Ellen flirts with Baltar in front of him, which she deflects by lying that Adama has made advances to her. The Tighs confront Adama in Baltar's lab, where he is explaining to Roslin and his son, Lee Adama (Jamie Bamber), how he had been keeping Ellen at a distance for as long as he could, both because of his suspicion that she might be a Cylon, and because of her history as a negative force in Tigh's life. Baltar declares Ellen human, but a conversation with Head Six (Tricia Helfer) reveals that he intends to do so for everyone, and he may be lying about Ellen's results.

In "Colonial Day", Ellen shakes hands with terrorist-turned-politician Tom Zarek (Richard Hatch) in public, immediately after Tigh refuses to. She wants their picture in the media, and predicts that Roslin is on the way out as President and Zarek is the future. Later, Ellen tells Zarek she has ambitions for herself and Tigh, and he asks her for help finding his "friend". This friend, a would-be assassin sent to kill Roslin but captured by Lee and Kara Thrace (Katee Sackhoff), is subsequently killed before he can implicate Zarek in the plot.

=== Season two ===
In "Scattered", Adama is in critical condition after being shot, and Tigh reluctantly takes command of Galactica. Anticipating that Adama may die and sensing weakness in Tigh, Ellen goads him to seize control, but he shuts her down. In "Fragged", Ellen assumes that Roslin's confused and slightly delirious state is a mental breakdown, when in fact she is suffering withdrawal from her cancer medication. Learning that Tigh is under pressure by representatives from the Twelve Colonies to give them access to Roslin, Ellen encourages him to do so, believing the sight of Roslin in her current condition will undermine her authority, and leave Tigh in unchallenged command of the ship and the fleet. The plan backfires when Roslin accesses her medication and denounces Tigh, who declares martial law. In "Resistance", a number of ships refuse to resupply Galactica in protest. Tigh is unsure what to do, and Ellen berates him, urging him to assert himself. Tigh's subsequent threats to the protesting factions result in a riot in which Colonial Marines kill four civilians. Tigh is bitter over Ellen's manipulations, but she is unapologetic, later encouraging him to fire on a ship carrying Lee and Roslin as it flees the Galactica. Adama appears and resumes command, sending Ellen away.

Tigh receives a death threat in "Final Cut", and an assassination attempt against him is averted. He and Ellen are subsequently confronted at gunpoint by a Marine disgruntled over the civilian deaths Tigh's actions caused. In "Sacrifice", Ellen is one of several hostages taken by would-be terrorist Sesha Abinell (Dana Delany), who demands that Adama hand over the imprisoned Number Eight Cylon copy so she may exact revenge for her husband's death in the Cylon attacks. Lee uses Ellen's attraction to him to manipulate her as part of his plan to distract Sesha's team. The humans settle on a habitable planet they call New Caprica in "Lay Down Your Burdens", but a year later, a Cylon fleet arrives and places the planet under occupation. Though they promise peace, Tigh is among those who vow to resist.

=== Season three ===
Four months later in "Occupation", Tigh is in a Cylon detention center for his Resistance activities, and has lost an eye. Ellen performs sexual favors for one of the Cylon Cavil (Dean Stockwell) models to effect his release. She continues doing so in "Precipice" to guarantee Tigh's continued safety. Cavil next demands information on an upcoming Resistance meeting under threat of having Saul arrested or killed. Ellen pockets a map to the location where the Resistance plans to rendezvous with an emissary from the Galactica, and the meeting is ambushed by Cylon Centurions. In "Exodus", Resistance member Sam Anders (Michael Trucco) realizes that Ellen is the one who betrayed them. He tells Tigh that if he does not "take care of" Ellen himself, less sympathetic members will, as any betrayal of the Resistance is punishable by death. Ellen confesses to Tigh, explaining that she loves him and would do anything to save him from harm. While holding her and telling her he loves her, Tigh gives Ellen a poisoned drink. She dies seconds later, and he weeps over her body.

=== Season four ===
Tortured by the recent revelation that he is one of the Final Five Cylons, Tigh confers with an imprisoned Caprica Six, but continually hallucinates Ellen in Six's place in "Escape Velocity" and "Sine Qua Non". His arrival on a devastated Earth in "Sometimes a Great Notion" triggers Tigh's memories of having been there 2000 years before, during the nuclear cataclysm which destroyed the planet. In that distant past, a dying Ellen says "Saul, it's okay. Everything's in place. We'll be reborn ... again. Together." Tigh realizes that she is the last of the Final Five Cylons.

In "No Exit", Ellen is resurrected aboard a Cylon Resurrection Ship after her death in "Exodus", but held captive there by Cavil. Her resurrection restores her memories of her true nature. It is revealed that the so-called Thirteenth Tribe, which had left the planet Kobol at the same time as the 12 tribes of humans which would become the Twelve Colonies, had been an early iteration of humanoid Cylons. They settled on Earth, and their resurrection technology was lost as they became able to reproduce sexually. Eventually, Ellen and the other four of the Final Five rediscovered the technology in time to survive the destruction of Earth by their own version of Cylon Centurions. Aboard their own resurrection ship, the five traveled to the Twelve Colonies to warn them of the danger of artificial intelligence, but without faster-than-light drives, the journey took 2000 years. They arrived to find the Colonies already at war with their own Cylon Centurions. To end the war, Ellen and her colleagues gave the Caprican Centurions resurrection technology and eight models of humanoid Cylons, imbued with human characteristics like love and mercy to prevent war. However Cavil, the Number One model, became convinced that humanity was evil and undeserving of survival. He murdered the Five, and placed new copies, their memories altered, among the humans to suffer along with them. After destroying the entire line of Number Sevens, Cavil orchestrated the infiltration of copies of the remaining seven models into the human race as both self-aware and sleeper agents. In the present, Ellen urges Cavil to end his persecution of the humans, but he refuses. The Cylons' resurrection technology has been lost via the destruction of the Resurrection Hub by the humans in "The Hub". Cavil demands that Ellen restore the technology for them, but she stalls by saying she needs the other four of the Five to do so. Before Cavil can have the information extracted from Ellen surgically, Sharon "Boomer" Valerii (Grace Park), a Number Eight model, helps her escape from the Resurrection Ship.

Ellen and Boomer return to the Galactica in "Deadlock", where rebel Cylon models Two (Callum Keith Rennie), Six, Eight and the last remaining Three (Lucy Lawless) have formed an alliance with the humans. Ellen is shocked to learn that Tigh has gotten Caprica Six pregnant, as Ellen and Saul were never able to have children. The Final Five vote over whether they and the rebel Cylons should leave the human fleet to go in their own direction. Tory Foster (Rekha Sharma) and Galen Tyrol (Aaron Douglas) vote to leave, while Tigh, and Sam Anders by proxy, vote to stay. Ever frustrated by her perception of Tigh's devotion to Adama over her, Ellen breaks the deadlock and votes to depart. Six's subsequent miscarriage prompts Ellen to admit that her vote was intended to hurt Saul, and she does not want to leave. In "Someone to Watch Over Me", Ellen realizes that Cavil orchestrated her escape so that Boomer could abduct the human-Cylon hybrid child Hera (Iliana Gomez-Martinez), daughter of Karl Agathon (Tahmoh Penikett) and another Eight copy, Sharon "Athena" Agathon.

In "Islanded in a Stream of Stars", Ellen consoles Tigh, who is grieving his lost child, by reminding him that he is the father of millions of Cylons. They help orchestrate the rescue of Hera from the Cylon "homeworld", a sprawling basestar called The Colony, in the series finale "Daybreak". The surviving humans find and settle on a second, pristine Earth, and the Tighs decide to spend the rest of their lives there together.

=== The Plan ===
In Battlestar Galactica: The Plan, a pair of Cavils monitor a set of resurrection tanks containing copies of the Final Five, two weeks before the cataclysmic Cylon attacks on the Twelve Colonies. They expect that the originals will be killed and resurrected, and with their memories restored will apologize for their appreciation of humans. Later, Ellen is in a bar on Picon talking to a mysterious stranger, one of the Cavils who wishes to experience the planet's destruction firsthand. He is annoyed at Ellen's suggestion that people cannot, and should not, change who they really are. She is severely injured by the blast that destroys the bar, but Cavil assures her cryptically that she will not die, saying "Your suffering isn't over yet, not when you've got so much left to learn." Cavil keeps Ellen alive as he feels she has not learned her "lesson" yet. They are evacuated from the planet in a Raptor, and Ellen ends up on the medical transport ship Rising Star, where she slips in and out of consciousness for weeks as she recovers from her injuries. As the fleet of Colonial survivors, led by the Battlestar Galactica, flees the pursuing Cylon forces, Cavil visits Ellen during the events of "33", and she asks him to find Saul. Cavil believes it is both cruel and necessary to keep her alive, as in all the years she has lived among the humans, she has "failed to observe the moral failures of humanity".

== Reception ==
Molyneaux wrote that the dynamic Ellen "lights up the screen", and Michael Saba of Paste described her as "the ruthless manipulator we know and love/hate".

Bernardin named Ellen's death in "Exodus" as his No. 1 Favorite Moment in the series, writing "It was so tender, so sweet, so heartbreaking to watch the one-eyed Saul Tigh poison his own wife because she was collaborating with the Cylons—using everything at her disposal, including her body and secret rebel plans, to buy her husband's freedom from toaster confinement." Handlen wrote, "That ability to present ambiguity in the midst of intense conflict is one of the show's great gifts, and nowhere is it more apparent than in the death of Ellen Tigh ... the acting on both sides here is gut-wrenching. It's hard to watch; it's also a brilliant move story-wise because you can understand the choices on both sides, and how each person felt forced into doing what they did ... It's a believable horror that leaves both victims painfully human. Elvy wrote, "The moral dilemma was a harrowing scene, played expertly by actors Michael Hogan and Kate Vernon." The second part of "Exodus" was highly praised, with special attention to the performances of Hogan and Vernon.

Gottlieb called Ellen's reveal as the final Cylon "the season's biggest shocker yet", while some reviewers were underwhelmed by the choice. Vernon said she never expected her character to get so much attention from fans. Ryan wrote, "I like the more assertive, thoughtful Ellen we see in 'No Exit'. I was never a big fan of the vampy Ellen in Seasons 1 and 2. I thought this iteration of the character was a bit more like the New Caprica Ellen—shrewd and sharp yet compassionate as well ... Kate Vernon was terrific as the most commanding and shrewd Ellen we've ever seen." Reviewing "Deadlock", Sepinwall wrote that "it was alternately hilarious and terrifying to see her shift from playing all-knowing mother to the Cylons to being consumed with her old jealousies at the thought of her husband knocking up one of her children." Bernardin praised the performances of the episode's love triangle between Ellen, Tigh and Caprica Six. Ryan wrote that Vernon "nailed those moments" and "gave Ellen (at first) the excessive dignity of a woman who is truly mortified and furious."
