= Deadlock (Battlestar Galactica) =

- Battlestar Galactica episode
- Episode no.: Season 4 Episode 16
- Directed by: Robert M. Young
- Written by: Jane Espenson
- Original air date: February 20, 2009

Guest appearances
- Kate Vernon as Ellen Tigh; Donnelly Rhodes as Doc Cottle; Rekha Sharma as Tory Foster; Roark Critchlow as Slick (Piano Player)

Episode chronology
← Previous "No Exit"	Next → "Someone to Watch Over Me"
- Battlestar Galactica season 4

"Deadlock" is the sixteenth episode in the fourth season of the reimagined Battlestar Galactica. It aired on television in the United States and Canada. The survivor count shown in the title sequence is 39,556.

== Plot summary ==
While running CAP, a combined Viper and Heavy Raider squadron detect the approach of a Raptor that has been logged as missing for years. After identifying the pilot as a Number Eight, Galactica allows the Raptor to land. To the shock of everyone, Ellen Tigh is onboard, having been believed dead for eighteen months. Tyrol warmly greets the Eight pilot before identifying her as Boomer to Admiral Adama. Upon learning that Boomer is the pilot, Adama has her locked in the ship's brig.

Ellen and Saul reunite and, after making love, go together to visit Sam Anders, who is still comatose. Tory Foster, Galen Tyrol, a Six and an Eight are also by Anders' bedside. The Cylons propose that since Ellen has returned, they should leave the human fleet, especially since Caprica Six is pregnant with Saul's fully-Cylon child and they no longer need humans in order to reproduce. Ellen did not know about Caprica Six being pregnant, and is angry at Saul as she was never able to conceive children, and Caprica could only have become pregnant if he truly loved her. Furthermore, because the other Cylons are the Final Five's creations, she views Saul's relationship with Caprica in an incestuous light.

A vote is had by the Final Five on whether they should stay with the human fleet, and they promise to be bound by the results of that vote. Tory Foster and Galen Tyrol vote they go, Saul Tigh votes they stay and they assume from what Anders has said previously he would also vote to stay, which leaves Ellen with the deciding vote. She states that she needs more time, and goes to visit Caprica Six in her quarters. She "accidentally" tells Caprica Six that she and Saul had sex, before telling her she believed Saul loved Caprica more than he loved her. Ellen then calls another meeting, and says she has decided that the Cylon fleet should leave. Saul refuses to leave, and Ellen says this is because he loves the ship and William Adama more than herself or Caprica Six. Caprica becomes upset and starts to lose the baby. He and Ellen unite to try to tell Caprica that Saul does love her which Ellen believes will save the baby, but Caprica Six still suffers a miscarriage. Saul goes to Adama for support, revealing that the baby's name was "Liam", short for William. (Writer Jane Espenson confirmed that Saul wanted to name his child after his best friend.)

Elsewhere, Tyrol and teams of Cylons attempt to fix the ship by using a Cylon polymer to grow into the cracks. Gaius Baltar rejoins his believers, who have taken up arms in order to get and keep supplies, but gives some away to starving people in "Dogsville" before the rest is stolen by the Sons of Ares. He appeals to Admiral Adama, who supplies him with weapons to prevent it happening in the future. Near the end of the episode, the monitor near Anders indicates that he has higher brain functions and his eyes flutter as in REM sleep. The episode ends with Roslin and Adama walking through the ship past a Six and an Eight working on the ship's hull and a group of mixed human and Cylon pilots. A Six has stopped in front of the Wall, staring at the photos, and Roslin realises that the Cylons have begun memorialising their dead there in the same way as the humans.

== Deleted scenes ==
Some material expanding on the situation in Dogsville was cut as the episode was originally eleven minutes too long for broadcast. In the cut scenes, it is explained that due to three years of war and a mutiny, there are no longer enough marines to maintain order in the fleet and they have been forced to retreat from Dogsville. The Sons of Ares take control of the food supply, except for the stash held by Baltar's cult. Lee Adama and Roslin discuss the possibility of bringing in Centurions to provide more security in civilian areas, however, Admiral Adama is firmly opposed. Thus, when Baltar approaches him for better weapons, Adama is faced with two options:

Effectively, the question for Adama is, allow a criminal gang to control the food supply, or allow Baltar's crazy cultists to control it. And Baltar's group, now armed to the teeth, would also serve as a civilian security force, which Adama figures is better than using centurions. In the end, Baltar's militia is the lesser of two evils.

== Ratings ==
"Deadlock" was seen by 1.528 million viewers (live viewing plus same day digital video recorder viewing), about 200,000 fewer viewers than for the previous episode.

== Critical reception ==
Alan Sepinwall of The Star-Ledger commented: "This episode makes clear that Cavil didn't invent entirely new personalities for his "parents" when he imprisoned them in new bodies. The real version of Ellen is smarter than the one we knew, and maybe more regal, but she's still just as frakked-up, just as trapped in the ring of fire with Saul as she ever was." Michael Saba of Paste Magazine felt the pace of the episode was "a little bit clunkier" compared to previous ones but that "standout performances" from Michael Hogan and Kate Vernon "rounded out" the episode. Maureen Ryan of the Chicago Tribune praised James Callis' performance of "Baltar's altruism and canny strategizing at once" as well as praising Kate Vernon and Tricia Helfer for their performances. Jevon Phillips of the Los Angeles Times was less impressed by Ellen Tigh's characterization, calling her "annoying" and the change from the "cool character" of the previous episode "disconcerting". Marc Bernardin of Entertainment Weekly felt "bored" by the repair of Galactica by the Cylons and was also unimpressed by the Baltar storyline, stating that "I just don't care enough about Baltar and his blinkered messiah complex to give a hoot" but "choked up a bit" at the scene where Adama comforts Saul on the loss of the baby but felt that overall the episode was just "full of arguing". Kelly West of Cinema Blend felt the episode was a "battleship version of Days of Our Lives".
