= Sine Qua Non (Battlestar Galactica) =

- Battlestar Galactica episode
- Episode no.: Season 4 Episode 8
- Directed by: Rod Hardy
- Written by: Michael Taylor
- Original air date: May 27, 2008

Guest appearance
- Mark Sheppard as Romo Lampkin

Episode chronology
← Previous "Guess What's Coming to Dinner?"	Next → "The Hub"
- Battlestar Galactica season 4

"Sine Qua Non" is the eighth episode in the fourth season of the reimagined Battlestar Galactica. It first aired on television on May 27, 2008. The episode name is a Latin term (it translates as "without which [there is] nothing") referring to something essential that cannot be done without. The survivor count shown in the title sequence is 39,674.

== Plot ==
The episode continues from the previous, "Guess What's Coming to Dinner?" with the injured Cylon Natalie taken to the sickbay. Despite Doctor Cottle's best efforts, Natalie's wounds prove fatal and she dies while projecting a forest for comfort. As a gesture of kindness, Doctor Cottle holds her hand as she dies. President Laura Roslin visits the Basestar accompanied by half of the pilots. After the hybrid is plugged in, the Basestar immediately jumps away to unknown coordinates. The Quorum must find a replacement for Roslin, who is assumed kidnapped. The Quorum can elect a temporary president, so Lee Adama solicits the help of a reluctant Romo Lampkin in choosing the best candidate.

Admiral Adama questions Lt. Sharon "Athena" Agathon in his quarters regarding why she shot Natalie. Athena confesses to Adama about the visions she had of Natalie and Gaius Baltar taking away her half-human, half-Cylon child, Hera. She is sent to the brig.

Admiral Adama must now both protect the fleet and find the rebel Basestar with Roslin and his troops on board. He orders Colonel Saul Tigh to interrogate Caprica-Six in the brig to try to get information from her about the Cylon hub. Tigh's interrogation/liaison is interrupted when a badly damaged missing Raptor jumps into contact range. Its flight data recorder shows where its jump originated. A raptor scouting mission to those coordinates finds the remains of a battle with a destroyed Cylon Basestar, Viper, and what is assumed to be the hub. Adama does not believe the destroyed Basestar was the rebels' ship with Roslin on board, and he orders four Raptors to remain there in case it returns.

Adama meets with Colonel Tigh in his cabin, with the cameras turned off, and confronts him with the information that he knows about Tigh's "meetings" with Caprica-Six in the brig. Adama reveals to Tigh that Caprica-Six is pregnant. Tigh, in shock, does not deny that he is the father and Adama accuses him of betrayal. Tigh, in turn, accuses Adama of risking the whole fleet by searching for Roslin. Angers explode and a short but brutal fight ensues between the two men, but the old friends soon stop and accept their unusual emotional predicaments. After the conflict, in which the model ship is broken, Adama remarks, "Do you know how many times I have had to repair this thing?"

All the names on the list of potential presidential candidates have been eliminated, but Lampkin realizes that there is only one person who could possibly replace Roslin, even if that person's name was not on the list. After finding Lee, Romo congratulates him on his successful candidacy, but Lee explains that he was never a candidate. Lampkin does not listen and pulls a gun on him. Lampkin, distraught by the loss of his wife during the attack on the colonies, does not believe humanity deserves to have a president who gives such hope as Lee. Lee Adama convinces Lampkin that there is hope and that he will make a difference. Lee is sworn in as acting president.

Admiral Adama will no longer risk his remaining pilots or the fleet in looking for Roslin, and hands over command of the Galactica to Tigh. The Admiral takes a Raptor and remains behind. While he waits, he reads the charred copy of Searider Falcon he'd given Roslin which was recovered from the damaged Raptor.
