= Number Six (Battlestar Galactica) =

Fictional character in Battlestar Galactica (2004)

- Battlestar Galactica character
- Promotional image of Number Six in season four
- First appearance: Miniseries
- Last appearance: Battlestar Galactica: The Plan
- Portrayed by: Tricia Helfer

In-universe information
- Species: Humanoid Cylon
- Gender: Female
- Colony: Cylon Homeworld
- Affiliation: Cylon

Number Six is a family of fictional characters from the reimagined science fiction television series Battlestar Galactica. The character is portrayed by Canadian actress and model Tricia Helfer. Of the twelve known Cylon models, she is the sixth of the "Significant Seven". Like the others of the "Significant Seven", there are several versions of her, including Caprica-Six, Shelly Godfrey, Gina Inviere, Natalie Faust, Lida, and Sonja. She is the only model that does not use one particular human alias for all copies. (Note: Although two of the Number Eights have been individuated by different military callsigns, and the marriage of one of them, they began with the same alias, Sharon Valerii.)

The character was named after Number Six, Patrick McGoohan's character from the 1960s British TV show The Prisoner.

== Appearance and personality traits ==
Throughout the show, Six is portrayed as a seductive, statuesque Cylon infiltrator. She was the first example shown of a new generation of Cylons capable of adapting to human form and emotions. Little else is known of her earlier years. She can, like other Cylons, retain memories which can be downloaded into another body if the original body is killed. Like her counterparts, her body was designed to mimic the human body at the cellular level, making her almost undetectable to testing procedures, and there are many copies of her in existence. Sixes and Eights are the Humanoid Cylon models shown most frequently. Sixes tend to have individualistic traits and are considerably susceptible to the full array of human emotions. Although extremely effective and adaptive, Sixes always show a certain disdain for their given chores and dislike being treated as expendable. Most versions of Six have platinum-blonde hair, including Caprica-Six, Shelly Godfrey and Sonja. Others such as Gina Inviere, Natalie Faust and Lida have honey-blonde hair, and one Six with black hair has been observed.

It was stated by Caprica showrunner Kevin Murphy that had the prequel series Caprica continued, it would be revealed that the Sixes' default personality was modeled after that of Zoe Graystone.

== Music ==
Since her debut in the mini-series, a leitmotif has been used in scenes featuring Tricia Helfer as Six. This simple 8-note motif was composed by Richard Gibbs. The 18/8 figure, with a 120 BPM tempo, is divided into 2 groups of 4 notes: 1st group played on the downbeats, 2nd group played on the upbeats. Each group is separated by 2 consecutive eight-notes rests on the 8th and 9th ones, resulting in a syncopated line but still keeping a feeling of even 4 notes played at an even interval: the 2nd group of 4 played on the upbeats is also followed by 2 eight-notes rests to end the 18/8 bar. It is almost always performed on a gamelan, and can be compared to an E5 note tuned at A 440 Hz. It also plays over the introduction to each episode of the series. On the published series soundtrack, the melody is listed as The Sense of Six. 22/28/akb5.jpg - Visionneuse Zupimages

== Versions ==
Copies of Number Six appear regularly, mostly within Cylon society. Several notable versions have had more prominent roles:

=== Caprica Six ===
At the beginning of the miniseries, a Six copy is involved in an intense affair with Dr. Gaius Baltar. Pretending to be an employee of a computer corporation, Six seduces Baltar while helping him with his work on the Colonial Defense System. After infiltrating the mainframe, Six reveals her true nature to Baltar. Just a few hours before the intended Cylon attack, she informs him that the Cylons will use the computer access code that he has given her to infiltrate the highest levels of Colonial defence systems; thereby disabling the Colonial military, and attacking the Twelve Colonies. That same day, the Cylons launch their multi-targeted attack and destroy most of humanity. Six uses her body to shield Baltar from a nuclear blast during the attack, saving his life and sacrificing hers.

In the episode "Downloaded", this Six copy is downloaded into a new body. Nicknamed "Caprica Six" by fellow Cylons, she is viewed as a hero within the Cylon civilization for her complete success in her mission to compromise the colonies' defences. She is surprised to discover she has 'emotions' and expresses a degree of regret at her actions, as evinced by her constant visions of Baltar. This "Head Baltar" acts as a critical counsellor and manipulator to her in the same way Head Six does for the real Baltar. Caprica Six is enlisted to motivate the resurrected Galactica copy of Sharon "Boomer" Valerii to move out of her apartment and reintegrate into Cylon society. However, in defiance of their superiors, both Caprica Six and Sharon opt instead to aid Sam Anders, to the extent that Caprica Six murders a Three to save him. Allowed by the Caprica Cavil, Caprica Six and Sharon then begin preaching peace with the humans as the way of God. This leads them to take over Cylon culture and to resume the hunt for humanity, leading them to the colony of New Caprica, which they take over in a bloodless coup facilitated by Baltar, who surrenders to Caprica Six as soon as the Cylons arrive.

After the Cylon occupation of New Caprica, Caprica Six alienates the other Cylons with her desire for peaceful coexistence with humans. Her reunion with the real Baltar, however, shatters her illusions about her former pawn, as Baltar impotently allows the Cylons to bully him into enacting their oppressive tyranny upon New Caprica. The other Cylons insist Baltar must sign an execution order for 200 insurgents in response to two suicide bombings by the human resistance movement. Baltar initially refuses and Caprica Six alone objects strongly to her fellow Cylons' desire for mortal retribution. These objections resulted in her being shot in the head by fellow Cylon, Aaron Doral. Her death and an immediate threat to shoot Baltar force him to sign the order. Caprica Six is reborn and helps Baltar escape onto a Cylon Basestar when New Caprica is ultimately abandoned by its population.

Caprica Six becomes involved in a ménage à trois with Baltar and Biers after settling on the Basestar and explicitly states she loves both of them. She was also instrumental in rescuing an inexplicably sick Hera from the Basestar. She assists in Athena's download and witnesses the obvious bond between Athena and Hera. Caprica subsequently disables and then kills Boomer who threatens to throttle Hera despite Athena's anguished pleas. She leads Athena and her child to a captured Raptor and returns with them to Galactica, where she is promptly imprisoned. In this situation, she is frequently used as a source of information about and means of understanding the Cylon's motivations.

Colonel Saul Tigh begins to make more frequent stops to her cell, questioning her about what it is like to exist as a Cylon. He confronts her about being responsible for the deaths of billions and whether she feels any remorse or if she can just 'flip a switch' and shut out the pain. Caprica Six questions Tigh's reasons for the line of questioning, unaware Tigh is one of the then-unrevealed 'Final Five' Cylons. When she goads him about needing to feel pain, he turns to leave but she assaults him and bludgeons him. To her surprise, he cries and begs for more pain, but in response, she abruptly aborts her assault, shakes her head and replies he does not need any more pain. She then kisses him passionately.

Dr. Cottle later reveals Caprica Six is pregnant. It is revealed Tigh is the father of the baby. After it is revealed, Tigh is one of the Final Five, Caprica Six's relationship with Tigh changes. The significance of her pregnancy increases as the child will not be a human-Cylon hybrid but will be a pure Cylon offspring. Caprica Six begins to live with Tigh in his quarters on Galactica and the two now share a very intimate and caring relationship. However, when Ellen Tigh returns, she, Tigh, and Caprica Six fight about whom Tigh really loves, and Caprica Six loses the baby.

She joins the rescue mission for Hera and is finally proud of Baltar, something she had always wanted, and feels was the one thing missing between the two of them. They both see Head Six and Head Baltar and are shocked the other sees them. The two defend Galactica against Cylon boarders and take Hera when they find her wandering alone. Caprica Six holds a gun on Cavil during the standoff over Hera and hands him the phone when the deal is made. Later, on Earth, she and Baltar are visited one last time by Head Six and Head Baltar, who explain their destiny was to protect Hera and while God's plan is never over, their lives will be much less eventful. Caprica Six and Baltar then go off to start new lives as farmers together.

Ronald D. Moore has stated that Baltar never bothered to learn her name. In the season finale, there's a flashback scene on Caprica in which Gaius tells her "he has forgotten her name." The non-canon novelization of the miniseries by Jeffrey A. Carver suggests Caprica Six went by the name Natasi.

=== Head/Inner/Messenger Six ===
A distinct copy derived from Caprica Six residing in Baltar's head since the destruction of the colonies, "Head Six" appears as a figment of his imagination, invisible to everyone else. She suggests this phenomenon might be caused by either a computer chip implant or insanity over his guilt. When Baltar undergoes an MRI-like "brain scan", it reveals no sign of a computer chip or any other foreign object in his brain. While this briefly leads Baltar to think he has truly gone insane, he concludes this is impossible, given Six's knowledge of events unknown to him (for example, the prediction of the birth of the Human/Cylon Hybrid to Sharon Agathon while a prisoner aboard Galactica). Confronted with this in Part II of "Home", Six declares that she is neither a computer chip nor a hallucination produced by mental instability. When Baltar then asks just who or what she is, she simply replies she is "an angel of God sent here to protect you, to guide you and to love you." She repeats this claim in the episode "Torn".

This Six often appears suddenly, without warning. She often advises and gives instructions to Baltar. While she usually appears to him as part of the real world, occasionally he interacts with her in an imagined but persistent dream-like setting within his mind.

While Six can physically interact with Baltar in his imagination, it is for most of the series unclear if she is able to physically affect him in the real world — this is finally resolved in the episode "Escape Velocity", where Head Six is shown lifting Baltar from the floor to a standing position after he endured repeated blows from a Galactica marine.

This manifestation of Six in particular is extremely religious. In contrast to the colonists, and like the other Cylons, she believes in a singular god, whom she identifies as Love. She constantly attempts to convince Baltar to believe in the Cylon god, and to accept his part in God's plan or will.

Her motivations are unclear. While some of her advice appears to benefit humanity, for example, pointing out a Cylon device to Baltar on Galactica and helping him build a Cylon detector, it more often serves only Baltar's needs, and she expresses enjoyment over what she considers the inevitable extinction of the human race, constantly saying humanity is naturally violent and would have destroyed itself without the Cylons' intervention.

Head Six appears to be somehow related to Caprica Six, which is the Six model who seduced Baltar on the planet Caprica and encouraged him to give her access to the Colonial Defense mainframe. This belief is supported by the fact that Caprica Six has her own Head Baltar, implying some sort of transcendental connection between those two specific characters. Nonetheless, once the audience is re-introduced to Caprica Six, it becomes clear that something more unusual is going on since Caprica Six and Baltar bear little resemblance in personality to their internal counterparts.

Head Six is seen less frequently following the departure from New Caprica. In her brief appearances in the first part of season 4, Baltar begins to refer to her as an angel.

In the final episode of the series, it is made clear that, like the Starbuck Avatar, Head Six is indeed an agent of a higher power as she claims, not a chip or a delusion inside Baltar's head. She and Head Baltar are the last-seen characters in the final moment of the episode, which takes place 150,000 years after the rest of the series. Their role as angel-like beings was to guide Baltar and Caprica Six in protecting Hera, and once that task is done, they leave them alone. She and Head Baltar speculate on whether the cycle will continue (recalling the theme of "all of this has happened before and all of this will happen again"); Head Six reveals that her excitement over humanity's potential extinction was a ruse and states her belief that the cycle has finally been broken.

Although the name is not used by characters in the context of the story, Executive Producer Ronald D. Moore revealed in his official SciFi BSG podcasts "Head Six" is the designation given to the character in scripts and production documents. In discussions of the final episode, Moore also calls this version Inner Six who, along with Inner Baltar, are "... messenger(s) of a higher power", reinforcing the variations "Head Six", "Inner Six" and "Messenger Six" (or Head/Inner/Messenger Baltar) used by fans to describe these characters.

During the Season 2 episode "Home", Gaius Baltar refers to Head Six as "Sara" when in the holding cell designed for Sharon Valerii earlier in the season. Whether this was an unauthorized ad-lib by the actor or perhaps it was what he calls her is unclear as she is never referred to by name again

=== Shelly Godfrey ===
In the episode "Six Degrees of Separation", a Number Six in the fleet using the name "Shelly Godfrey" appears. Godfrey attempts to frame Baltar for betraying the human race with supposed photographic evidence. In addition, she attempts to seduce Commander Adama. She disappears abruptly after her "photographic evidence" is proven to be fake. This leads the people of the fleet to conclude she was a Cylon agent trying to discredit Dr Baltar because of his Cylon detector research. Baltar's popularity increases as a result. Felix Gaeta notes that once the photo was resolved, identifying it as a fake was almost too easy, "like she wanted to be found out." As her appearance coincided with the temporary disappearance of Head Six, it is often wondered (and indeed voiced by Baltar himself) whether she was a physical manifestation of Head Six posing in a dual identity.

The episode does cause the audience (and Baltar) to think Shelly Godfrey is related to Head Six, however this is demonstrated to be a deliberate red herring in subsequent episodes of Battlestar Galactica. The telemovie Battlestar Galactica: The Plan reveals that Godfrey is indeed an actual Six. After the photo was discovered to be fake, the John Cavil (a Number One model) onboard Galactica who was coordinating Cylon efforts made her enter an airlock and be killed so she could download and give Galactica's coordinates to the Cylon fleet. Another Six donned a wig and clothing identical to Godfrey's in order to confuse the guards and allow Godfrey to get away from them. In the hallway, Cavil intimates that Godfrey has failed to produce convincing fake evidence because she is attracted to Baltar, and her statement that Baltar is "a brilliant man" who helped them so much on Caprica supports this, despite her protestation that Cavil should have seen her with him because "I was brutal with him. I pushed him." Later, on Cavil's bed, the other Six also notes her sister's complete destruction of the Sixes' cover and her utter failure to discredit Baltar and "his dreamy hair".

=== Gina Inviere ===
Gina, as she appears in Razor

In the episode "Pegasus" and the telemovie Battlestar Galactica: Razor, it is revealed a copy of Six had hidden aboard the Pegasus, posing as a civilian network administrator and using the name Gina Inviere (supposedly Old Gemenese for "resurrection"; in reality, înviere is Romanian for "resurrection".) This Number Six gains the confidence of Rear Admiral Helena Cain, with whom she has a romantic relationship, and then-Lieutenant Kendra Shaw, who gives Gina the administrator codes for the Pegasus mainframe. Gina uses Shaw's password in order to disable the Pegasus during a Cylon attack, enabling the ship to be boarded by centurions. Shaw sees another Six with the centurions thereby exposing Gina as a Cylon. Gina manages to get her hands on a gun, but hesitates to shoot Cain, indicating that Gina's relationship with Cain was not an act. Gina's hesitation enables Shaw to knock her unconscious before Gina can make a decision. Cain orders her former lover's imprisonment, condemning her as a thing, and allows Gina to be subjected to torture and gang rape by members of the Pegasus' crew. By the time of the events of "Pegasus", Gina appears to be catatonic from the severe trauma of her abuse.

In "Pegasus", Baltar treats Gina's injuries and transfers his love of Caprica Six to her, causing Gina to finally start responding. In the two-part episode "Resurrection Ship," Gina comes out of her catatonic state completely and is so traumatized from her ordeal that she wishes to truly die. To this end, Gina supplies Baltar with vital intelligence on the Cylon Resurrection Ship so that the fleet can destroy it. Once the Resurrection Ship has been destroyed, Gina kills her guard and begs Baltar to kill her. Instead, Baltar releases Gina to seek justice for her torment. Gina corners her former lover, Admiral Cain, in her quarters and kills her in revenge before escaping from the Pegasus. She then joins a group of Cylon sympathizers, who want humanity to make peace with the Cylons. The extensive sexual abuse she has suffered renders Gina psychologically unable to be intimate with Baltar until shortly before her death.

In the finale of the second season, Gina detonates a nuclear weapon she had received from Dr Baltar, killing herself, signalling the location of the human settlement to the Cylons, and destroying the Cloud 9 and several other ships in the human fleet. While the destruction of the Resurrection Ship in Resurrection Ship Part 2 initially indicates Gina's death to be final, The Plan reveals that there was another Resurrection Ship in range shortly before Gina's death as stated by the fleet's copy of John Cavil. However, Gina does not appear to have been downloaded with the Cylons only finding New Caprica by way of detecting the signature of her nuclear detonation a year later. Presumably, this second Resurrection Ship was out of range as the Cylons had chosen to stop chasing the fleet at the time due to the efforts of Boomer and Caprica Six.

Gina has honey-blonde hair, actress Tricia Helfer's natural hair colour, instead of the platinum-blonde of most Sixes. Like Shelly Godfrey, she sometimes wears glasses.

Series creator Ron Moore says in the DVD commentary for "Pegasus", the name "Gina" is directly meant as a jab against critics of the reimagined series who use the derogatory term "GINO" (Galactica In Name Only) to describe it.

Gina appears briefly in one of Boomer's flashbacks in The Plan. Gina helped prep Boomer for her upcoming transition to a sleeper agent and provided IT support for her cover identity.

=== Natalie Faust ===
Natalie

An assertive and authoritative version of Number Six named Natalie appears in the episode "Six of One". Following a vote to lobotomize Cylon raiders in which a single copy of Number Eight (Boomer) gave the swing vote in favour of lobotomy by siding against the rest of her model, Natalie, along with the remaining Number Sixes, Eights and Twos, leads a coup against the other models. They decide to give sentience to the Cylon Centurions, making them self-aware and capable of feeling for the first time. The other models, led by Cavil, are dumbstruck by this decision and attempt to destroy Natalie and her followers permanently in the episode titled "The Ties That Bind", luring them into an ambush by pretending to acquiesce to their demands that they stop lobotomizing the Raiders, unbox the entire Number Three model, and use the knowledge gained by the Three known as D'Anna at the Temple of Five to identify and join with the lost "Final Five" humanoid Cylon models. The Resurrection Ship is jumped out of range during this ambush so that the deaths suffered by the rebels are permanent.

A Number Two from their damaged Baseship, Leoben Conoy, takes a Heavy Raider and manages to make contact with Lieutenant Kara "Starbuck" Thrace and her crew on the Demetrius, a sewage processing vessel repurposed for long-range exploration in the episode "The Road Less Traveled". Conoy offers an alliance between the rebel Cylons and the Colonials. In the episode "Faith", Conoy, Thrace and some of the Demetrius crew take a Colonial Raptor to the rebel Basestar and make repairs, allowing the Baseship – the Demetrius following behind – to jump to the Colonial fleet in the episode "Guess What's Coming to Dinner", in which Natalie makes a deal with Rear Admiral Adama on the Galactica to reveal the location of the main Cylon Resurrection Hub and help the Colonials destroy it, ending resurrection for the enemy Cylons, as long as she can bring the "Final Five" with her off the Galactica after Earth is located. And so, a tenuous alliance is formed. Natalie is on her way to speak to Adama again when she encounters the human-Cylon hybrid infant Hera Agathon in the corridor and bends down to talk to her. Natalie is then confronted and shot by Hera's mother Sharon "Athena" Agathon, the Number Eight who left the Cylons, married Karl "Helo" Agathon and joined Galactica's crew, because of a dream Athena had in which a Number Six took her daughter. Somehow the rebel Basestar's hybrid detects her shooting and panics, causing the ship to jump away. Near the beginning of the episode "Sine Qua Non", Natalie is taken to the Galactica infirmary for treatment where she dies of her injuries. As Natalie dies, she projects a forest scene, a favourite projection of Number Six model. Doctor Cottle also holds Natalie's hand as she dies in an act of kindness for the mortally wounded woman. With no Resurrection Ship in range, her death is permanent.

Her surname is not used onscreen, and her first name is only used once, by a Number Eight in the episode "The Hub", who notes that the Hybrid of their Baseship has reacted to Natalie being killed or injured on Galactica. Nor is her backstory elaborated on. Michael Angeli's original version of the script for the episode "Six of One" has John Cavil refer to Natalie Faust by her full name and mention that she infiltrated Gemenon posing as a political reform advocate. During the Cylon attack, she was responsible for relaying the coordinates of all the Gemenese leaders.

=== Sonja ===
A copy named Sonja who has been elected to represent the Cylons in the Quorum. Sonja has taken over Natalie's place as the leader of the rebel faction of Cylons. Sonja's appearance is that of a typical Six. In her first act as the cyclon leader, she requests that Roslin and Adama hand over Boomer in order to try her for treason against the Cylons. She is later seen at a meeting of the new Quorum of Ships' Captains, representing the rebel Basestar, as they discuss the impending transfer of Admiral William Adama's command from the ageing Galactica to the Basestar. Before the operation to rescue Hera, Sonja and Ellen Tigh are seen discussing the whereabouts of The Colony the place they knew Boomer was going to take Hera to. Sonja revealed that Number One, John Cavil had moved The Colony from its original location 5 months prior shortly before the Cylon civil war took place. And in the series finale, she is seen along with a two and an eight discussing their plan with Adama on how to populate the new Earth saying that they'll stay alongside the humans in their new home until their own deaths come.

=== "Tough Six" ===
A brunette Six with blonde streaks appears in Battlestar Galactica: The Plan. She had been a prostitute on the Colonies, and eventually drunkenly mocks John Cavil's schemes while sharing a bed with him, following the not-quite-fatal shooting of Commander Adama by Cylon sleeper agent Boomer and the suicide of their fellow infiltrator Simon O'Neill, a Number Four. She points out that most of the Cylons' failings, including those mentioned above, along with Number Two Leoben Conoy's interaction with Lieutenant Kara "Starbuck" Thrace and Shelly Godfrey's failure to ruin Gaius Baltar, have been due to love, and leaves the room telling Cavil that "you can't declare war on love". She typically wears chains-and-leather clothing and has been seen to chew bubblegum during a Cylon meeting in Cavil's chapel, sitting next to Godfrey, who has platinum hair and wears glasses and a sensible blouse and skirt. Cavil notes that the Sixes have done a good job of distinguishing themselves and praises Godfrey for it, in contrast to the Number Five/Aaron Doral copy who has individuated himself from the copy abandoned on Ragnar only by wearing a teal suit instead of a burgundy one, in the same cut.

This Six, not given a name onscreen but referred to as "Tough Six" in the shooting script, was instrumental in the mysterious disappearance of Ms Shelly Godfrey from Galactica, using a wig and a change of clothes to imitate Godfrey's appearance and confuse the marines who were tailing her, making them think that Godfrey had gotten further ahead of them when the real Godfrey was pulled into another corridor by John Cavil. Godfrey and Cavil then slipped away and Cavil airlocked Godfrey, while the marines were chasing Tough Six, who evaded them. The ultimate fate of Tough Six is unknown, whether she was captured and executed or remained in the fleet until New Caprica, as she is not seen in The Plan following her exit from Cavil's bedroom and did not appear in regular episodes.

=== Other versions ===
Number Sixes have been shown in a variety of roles, including repairing the Galactica ("Deadlock" and "Someone to Watch Over Me"), hospital administration ("The Farm"), serving as Heavy Raider pilots, and as rebel Cylon leaders (Natalie and Sonja). Other versions include:

- A copy in a red tunic, who arrives aboard the Armistice Station and seduces the Colonial representative (otherwise known as Boxey's father) shortly before the station is destroyed. Similar copies are part of the group that board Ragnar Anchorage to rescue and debrief Aaron Doral.
- A copy, wearing a white overcoat, who captures and kisses Helo before being shot by Sharon Agathon. Another white coat-wearing Six observes their escape, and another (possibly one of these two) later leads Centurion troops in pursuit of them. In "Razor", a copy in a white coat is the one seen and shot by Kendra Shaw during a Cylon boarding raid on the Pegasus. In "The Plan", another white coat wearing copy appears to be overseeing the Centurions pinning down the Colonial forces during the events of "Lay Down Your Burdens." This copy communicates the Cylon-Colonial truce to the Caprica copy of John Cavil who agrees to let the human fleet know despite his model voting against it.
- A copy of Six in a black suit, who acts as "overseer" to the breeding experiment concerning Helo and Sharon Agathon. This copy or a similar one is killed by Starbuck in the Delphi Museum while retrieving the Arrow of Apollo. The copy of number Eight that would eventually become known as Sharon Agathon warned that she would soon download into a new body and lead the Cylons to their position. A copy of this type is also killed by Starbuck while escaping the Cylon farm
- Copies, clad in gold tunics, who act as "nurses" or "midwives", helping Caprica Six and Boomer through their respective resurrections.
- Two copies that take part in a meeting aboard Colonial One on New Caprica, and agree with the proposal to execute over 200 human detainees. They vote on behalf of the majority of the Number Six model (Caprica Six dissents).
- A raven-haired copy, dying from a disease aboard a basestar, whom Baltar strangles after she hysterically accuses him of deliberately leading them to the disease-carrying beacon (perhaps in an effort to get him to kill her).
- Copies from the infected basestar that are brought aboard Galactica. Along with the other captured infected Cylons, they are suffocated by Helo before the Galactica enters Cylon resurrection range to prevent the Colonials from committing genocide.
- A copy from "Faith" aboard the damaged Basestar. She recognizes crew-member Jean Barolay as a resistance fighter from New Caprica who gagged her, threw her into a septic tank and watched her drown, an event that has left her emotionally traumatized. After Barolay tells her she'd be happy to do it again, the copy attacks and kills her. Shortly afterwards she is shot and killed by another Six copy, Natalie who does it to give the Colonials "justice" since there is no Resurrection Ship in range.
- A copy named Lida, with long brown hair, who comforts Gaius Baltar in Blood on the Scales.
- Multiple Sixes are seen as pilots of Cylon Heavy Raiders working alongside Galactica pilots in Faith and Someone to Watch Over Me. They use "Six" as their de facto surname. (Note: Starbuck refers to one of her pilots as "Six" (not "a Six" or "this Six"), and Helo addresses one as "Six".)
- The "Cylon Prototype" voiced by Helfer in the last episode of Blood and Chrome.

== Casting ==
Tricia Helfer was cast after a strong audition, despite some initial concerns over her lack of acting experience. Director Michael Rymer explains:

"It wasn't just the way she looked; she just has this vibe about her. Nobody gets how hard that role is, to bring the depth, the vulnerability and the mystery to essentially a robot chick."

Among the other actresses who auditioned for the role were Melinda Clarke and Leah Cairns, who went on to play Racetrack.

== Reception ==
James Maddox of Game Rant wrote, "Tricia Helfer's seductive Number Six came to define the humanoid Cylon in pop culture and is in many ways the most iconic element of the franchise as a whole."

In 2006, Tricia Helfer was awarded the Leo Award for "Best Lead Performance by a Female in a Dramatic Series" for her role as Number Six in the episode "Pegasus".
