= Someone to Watch Over Me (Battlestar Galactica) =

- Battlestar Galactica episode
- Episode no.: Season 4 Episode 17
- Directed by: Michael Nankin
- Written by: David Weddle; Bradley Thompson
- Original air date: February 27, 2009

Guest appearances
- Kate Vernon as Ellen Tigh; Donnelly Rhodes as Doc Cottle; Rekha Sharma as Tory Foster; Roark Critchlow as Slick (Piano Player)

Episode chronology
← Previous "Deadlock"	Next → "Islanded in a Stream of Stars"
- Battlestar Galactica season 4

"Someone to Watch Over Me" is the seventeenth episode in the fourth season of the reimagined Battlestar Galactica. It aired on television in the United States and Canada on February 27, 2009. The survivor count shown in the title sequence is 39,556.

== Plot ==
Kara Thrace is depressed that her husband, Samuel Anders, is still in a coma, with little good news from Dr. Cottle concerning his condition. She has returned to a bleak daily routine after the events of her leading the fleet to Earth, when she had felt special, as if she had a purpose and knew what she was doing for the first time in her life. She is also plagued by nightmares of the body that was presumably her own, crashed on Earth.

Thrace makes friends with the bar's piano player, and slowly reveals to him that her father used to play the piano too. During the process, she discusses her childhood and her feelings towards her father, who left the family and never contacted her or her mother again, much as the piano player did with his own family. Thrace assists the piano player with writing a new song. Eventually, he convinces a reluctant Thrace to play the piano too. The piano player shows affection towards Starbuck much in the same way her father did. Together they play a song she faintly remembers from her childhood, and eventually she realizes a drawing given to her earlier by Hera Agathon is not a drawing of stars, as Hera said, but a sequence of musical notes that matches the song from her memory.

Together, Thrace and the piano player reconstruct the song, which turns out to be the music the four of the Final Five present on Galactica heard throughout the events of Crossroads Pt. II. Saul Tigh, Ellen Tigh, and Tory Foster, who were all lingering in the bar while Thrace and the piano player were reconstructing the song, confront her about the song's origin, to which she replies that she used to play it as a child with her father. A flashback to Kara's childhood reveals that Kara's father looked exactly like the piano player. When Kara turns to the piano player, he has mysteriously vanished.

In the meantime, Sharon "Boomer" Valerii is about to be extradited by the Colonial fleet to the rebel Cylons, who plan to try her for treason for siding with Cavil. They seek the death penalty; now that there is no Cylon resurrection available anymore, death would be permanent. Boomer tricks Galen Tyrol into helping her to leave the Galactica by claiming that she still sees a future for them together. Through Cylon mental projection, she shows Tyrol a home she has "constructed" for them both, including their child.

She beats Sharon "Athena" Agathon and ties her up, putting her in a closet, just before Karl "Helo" Agathon walks in on them. She has sex with him, while the tied up Athena watches through an opening, gagged and unable to speak. She then kidnaps Hera, escapes by stealing a Raptor, and causes damage to the Galactica by performing an FTL jump too close to the ship. The episode ends with Tyrol's devastation after realizing that Boomer tricked him and he has unwittingly helped her kidnap Hera.

== Production ==
Writer David Weddle comments on Boomer's motives: "It's difficult to say someone who did that loves the Chief, and yet in her damaged way, I think she did and still does love him."

Due to the musical focus in this episode, composer Bear McCreary was involved in production of the episode from the earliest drafts. While attempting to compose a new song together with Kara Thrace, the piano player (Slick) moves his fingers across the keyboard searching for a melody, a riff which Thrace recognizes as sounding similar to a classical piece called “Nomion’s 3rd Sonata, 2nd Movement” which in actuality is the opening fanfare to the original Battlestar Galactica: a piece called “Exploration” written by Stu Phillips.

== Broadcast and reception ==
=== Ratings ===
"Someone to Watch Over Me" was seen by 1.657 million viewers (live viewing plus same day digital video recorder viewing), about 100,000 more viewers than for the previous episode.

=== Critical reception ===
Alan Sepinwall of The Star-Ledger found that the episode was an excellent showcase for both Katee Sackhoff and Grace Park, and praised director Michael Nankin who "[infused] this episode with the qualities of a nightmare." Michael Saba of Paste Magazine called the episode an "exercise in building tension through omission" and felt the episode was "excellent". IGN writer Eric Goldman praised the writers of the show for the plot turns in the episode, in particular the fact that Boomer's returning to the fleet with Ellen Tigh was in fact just a ruse. Goldman felt the subplot involving Kara was "a bit meandering" but that Katee Sackhoff and Roark Critchlow gave strong performances. Cinema Blend felt the writers "threw a neat little curveball" with the Roark Critchlow piano playing character being Thrace's father. Marc Bernardin of Entertainment Weekly felt the Boomer storyline was "awesome" but was less impressed by the storyline involving Thrace, feeling "that it didn't tell us anything new" and that the writers had written a very obvious ending to the subplot.
