= Kara Thrace =

Character in Battlestar Galactica (2004)

- Battlestar Galactica character
- Katee Sackhoff as Kara "Starbuck" Thrace
- First appearance: The Miniseries
- Last appearance: "Daybreak"
- Portrayed by: Katee Sackhoff

In-universe information
- Alias: Starbuck
- Gender: Female
- Title: Lieutenant (until Episode 2.10) Captain (after Episode 2.11)
- Colony: Caprica
- Affiliation: Colonial Fleet

"He looks at Starbuck as this great warrior who can just get things done. She doesn't question herself. She's really authentic. She is who she is. And Lee envies her clarity."

— Jamie Bamber discussing the character of Starbuck and how Apollo views her.

Kara Thrace (callsign "Starbuck") is a fictional character in the 2004 Battlestar Galactica series. Played by Katee Sackhoff, she is a revised version of Lieutenant Starbuck from the 1978 Battlestar Galactica series. She is one of the main characters on the show.

== Overview ==
Described by a critic as "one of television's most complex, ever-evolving characters", the role of Starbuck changed over the run of the series. According to Sackhoff, Starbuck originally "didn't value her own life," and this attitude inspired her readiness to die for her shipmates. By the end of the series, however, she is prepared to sacrifice herself for others because she respects all life. The character's physical appearance is based on Sackhoff's perception of Starbuck as an extremely fit, hard-drinking individual. "I didn't want Starbuck to be completely ripped," said Sackhoff. "This is a girl who drinks most of her calories.". A psychologist who specialises in treating Borderline Personality Disorder has described Starbuck's character as showing "many borderline traits, including unstable emotions, behaviours and relationships, self-destructive behaviors, boundary diffusion, identity confusion, impulsivity, and intense attachments."

Kara Thrace bears some parallels to the original 1978 Starbuck character: both are portrayed as hot-headed and arrogant fighter pilots, considered the best in the fleet, but with a tendency to challenge authorities and get into trouble. Both are avid gamblers and enjoy drinking, smoking cigars, and having sex. Both have crashed and been marooned on a deserted planet, using a downed Cylon ship to make an escape. Both are best friends with Apollo. Kara had a relationship with Apollo's late brother Zak (mirroring the original Starbuck's on-and-off relationship with Apollo's sister Athena), affecting her relationship with Apollo and Zak's father, William Adama.

Whereas the original Starbuck, played by Dirk Benedict, was a slick, well-groomed ladies' man, Kara appears more rugged and grimy. The characters differ, not only in respect of their gender – complicating Kara's relationships with other characters – but also in outward appearance. USA Today described her as "the broken warrior, a young, idealistic soldier who has been fighting for all the right reasons, but has lost something along the way."

== Character history ==
=== Background ===
The series bible developed for the TV series by Ron D. Moore states that Kara Thrace was born on Picon, but because her mother was in the Colonial Marines, she grew up as a military brat bouncing between different military bases on different planets during her entire childhood. The result is that she has no particular attachment to Picon and lived on Caprica for some years before the TV series begins. As this information is from the series bible but never stated on-screen, it is unknown if Kara is canonically considered a Caprican or a Picon. However, her situation appears somewhat similar to Gaius Baltar, who grew up on Aerilon but moved to Caprica when he left home for university, then stayed the rest of his life there and abandoned all connections to his past. As Ron Moore has said, the Twelve Colonies of Kobol united under one government only fairly recently, during the first Cylon war fifty years ago, thus many people still think in terms of affiliation to each of the "Twelve Tribes" - but technically under the new federal government, they switched to a residency system. Thus, as Moore explained, Baltar was able to become the Caprican delegate to the Quorum of Twelve as a naturalized citizen of Caprica and considered himself to be a Caprican in nationality, but he was not ethnically a "Caprican". Similarly, Kara may be ethnically a Picon, but she loosely considers herself to be a naturalized Caprican.

Kara Thrace had intended to be a professional pyramid ballplayer until her knee gave out. She eventually joined the military, where she found more acceptance than she had felt at home as an abused child. (Note: Family problems had previously been alluded to but the physical abuse is confirmed in "The Farm" when the Cylon Simon points out that every one of her fingers on both hands had been broken in the same place. Simon suggests she might not want to have children because of that, due to fears of passing the abuse on to them. There is a strong reaction from Kara but no further clarification on the topic within that episode. Later, in "Maelstrom", it is revealed her mother once punished her by placing her hand in a doorframe and slamming the door shut.) Although Kara's mother, Socrata Thrace, had served as a corporal in the first Cylon war, Kara was the first person in the family to become a commissioned officer. Socrata was not content with her daughter's military record, however, claiming she was not disciplined enough and was wasting her natural talent for flying. Kara's father, Dreilide Thrace, was a pianist. He left the family when Kara was a child, as Socrata had forced him to make a choice between his beloved piano playing and a steadier job to support the family.

As a flight instructor at the Colonial flight school, Kara met and became romantically involved with one of her students, Zak Adama. Although Zak told her he did not want any special treatment from her, Kara passed him even though he failed basic flight, as she could not bring herself to crush his dreams.

Her leniency cost Zak his life when he died on his first Viper mission. After his death, Starbuck met his father, William Adama. He realized Starbuck and Zak had been engaged and brought her under his command as a lieutenant. Zak's death, however, created a wedge between Adama and his other son, Lee "Apollo" Adama, who blamed his father for Zak's death, for creating an expectation that made Zak feel he needed to pursue becoming a Viper pilot in order to earn his father's affection. After the funeral, Lee broke off all contact with his father and Starbuck.

Starbuck has a natural talent for flying and is considered Galactica's best pilot, although she also is known for being an avid card player and drinker as well as for an eruptive temper. Bill Adama loves Kara despite her flaws and considers her something of a surrogate daughter. However, Starbuck and Colonel Tigh share a mutual sense of loathing, despite - or perhaps because of - their similarities. At the time of the attack on the Colonies, she was second in command of Galactica's fighter wing.

=== After the attack ===
In a card game prior to Galactica's decommissioning ceremony, Starbuck responds to Colonel Tigh's mocking of her call sign and her stint in the brig as a cadet by alluding to Tigh's troubled relationship with his wife. Infuriated, he flips the table over, and she punches him in the face. He sends her to the brig, promising her that her career is over. However, Adama tells Tigh he is probably overreacting: while he agrees to leave Kara in the brig until after the ceremony, Adama says there is no need to ruin her career over the incident. Following the Cylons' attack on the Twelve Colonies of Kobol, Starbuck is released to join the battle.

Starbuck keeps her secret about Zak buried inside until after the Cylon attack on the Twelve Colonies of Kobol. Soon after, when Starbuck fears she and the rest of humanity might be wiped out by the Cylons, she confesses her mistake to Lee. He is devastated. Later, he confronts her about it when she is chosen to train new Viper pilots aboard Galactica after several pilots are killed in a freak accident. The quality of recruits she is sent is subpar but still, she begins their training, ordering them to call her "God". Starbuck, blinded by guilt, washes all the pilots out for relatively minor flaws. She then admits her secret to Adama who is furious and heartbroken; he orders her to reinstate the trainees.

On the next training mission, Starbuck and the trainees are ambushed by a small group of Cylon Raiders. Starbuck engages the Raiders on her own to cover the trainees' escape. With her Viper heavily damaged, she plummets toward the surface of a nearby desert moon and is forced to eject and take her chances on the surface.

Starbuck is declared "missing in action", and Adama orders a search and rescue operation which strains the Galactica's crew and combat resources. On the surface, Starbuck struggles with a broken knee and near asphyxiation as her oxygen runs out. Luckily, she discovers the Cylon Raider she downed. Using her exceptional skill in flying, she figures out the Cylon technology and is able to pilot it back to the fleet.

Depressed by her injuries, she initially needs the incentive to work on rehabilitation and is soon rubbing people the wrong way again. Even after she is able to move around without a cane, the injury sidelines her from flight for many episodes; when given tactical charge of a mission in one episode, she cannot fly the critical role because her knee still can't handle the G-force.

During her recovery, a Number Two named Leoben is discovered aboard the Gemenon Traveller and is arrested. Adama assigns Starbuck to interrogate Leoben, believing she will be resistant to his mind games. Starbuck brutally interrogates Leoben, and he claims to have hidden a nuclear bomb on a timer somewhere in the fleet, threatening its detonation. Despite her often-crude exterior, Starbuck is revealed to have a deep-seated faith in the gods, and engages in a debate about the existence of the Colonial gods vs. the Cylon god with Leoben, and whether the humanoid Cylons are actually "human". Leoben demonstrates that he is capable of breaking free and killing Starbuck at any time, but chooses not to, believing it is not God's will. During this period, Starbuck develops respect for Leoben, and he falls in love with her. She is genuinely saddened when President Laura Roslin orders him executed by airlock after he admits there is no bomb. She experiences a brief moment of emotional connection with Leoben when they touch palms through the glass of the airlock before he is executed. Afterwards, she privately prays to the Lords of Kobol, acknowledging that Leoben might not have had a soul, but if he did, asking that they take care of it.

Starbuck's religious beliefs later come into play when President Roslin asks her to carry out a dangerous mission: return to Caprica and retrieve the Arrow of Apollo, a religious artifact supposedly pointing the way to Earth. Starbuck is at first reluctant, believing that Adama already knows the way to Earth, and is leading them there. Roslin is forced to reveal that Adama lied about knowing Earth's whereabouts to give the fleet hope. This deeply shakes Starbuck's trust in Adama, and she eventually is convinced to help Roslin. She takes the Cylon Raider she had captured, leading Adama to declare Roslin had suborned mutiny; he sends a detachment of Marines to terminate her presidency.

During her time on Caprica, Starbuck encounters a Number Six (who beats her soundly) but manages to kill the Cylon out of sheer luck. She then meets up with Karl "Helo" Agathon (a close friend she believed dead after he stayed on Caprica) and the Sharon Valerii copy pregnant with his child. Immediately realizing that Sharon is a Cylon, she attempts to kill her, while Helo stops her. This causes Sharon to flee in the stolen Raider, abandoning Starbuck and Helo. While attempting to find an alternative route off Caprica, they meet a resistance group that had been waging a guerrilla war against the Cylons, led by fellow pyramid player Sam Anders. Kara and Anders develop a bond over their shared past as pyramid players and develop a romantic relationship. At one point Starbuck is injured in battle, captured, and wakes up in a Cylon "farm" as part of their experiments to create human/Cylon hybrids, but is originally led to believe she is in a hospital run by the resistance. A Cylon named Simon, posing as a doctor, experiments on her, claiming to be treating her for internal injuries, and keeps her in a drugged state. Without her knowledge, apparently one of her ovaries is surgically removed before she escapes; a fact discovered only much later. Starbuck escapes with the help of the resistance, killing Simon. Sharon returns with a Cylon Heavy Raider, and Starbuck plans to return to the fleet with her and Helo. However, she personally promises Anders that she will return with reinforcements to rescue the Resistance, giving Anders her dog tags as part of her promise.

She, Helo, and Sharon arrive on the planet Kobol, joining Roslin in her search for the Tomb of Athena. Sharon is able to guide them to the tomb, and Adama joins them. They are able to place the Arrow of Apollo in the tomb and gain a rudimentary map to Earth.

Soon after returning to Galactica, the Battlestar Pegasus, commanded by Rear Admiral Helena Cain, is discovered. Cain promotes Starbuck to captain and assigns her as the CAG of the Pegasus.

After the fleet leadership denies her request to return to rescue the Caprican resistance fighters, Starbuck is depressed and guilt-stricken: she has broken her word, failed her duty, and assumes the man she is "hung up on" is either dead or will be soon.

After Lee Adama's promotion to Commander and appointment as commander of the Battlestar Pegasus, Starbuck transfers back to the Galactica and assumes the role of its CAG.

=== New Caprica ===
The complication of Starbuck and Lee's relationship was furthered when a drunken night on the newly found planet, New Caprica, ended with Starbuck and Lee having a one-night stand where they both expressed their love for one another. When Lee woke up alone the next morning, he soon discovered Kara had proposed to and married Anders. Lee soon marries newly commissioned Lieutenant Anastasia Dualla while Starbuck moves planetside with Anders.

After an all-night celebration of the first founder's day for New Caprica, tired and hungover, Starbuck and Tigh put their differences behind them. They even greet each other fondly following Tigh's demobilization and arrival at the colony. Her relationship with Lee, however, worsened to the point that they were not on speaking terms, and he had little interest in helping her, even when Anders contracted a serious bout of pneumonia.

After the Cylon invasion of New Caprica, she is imprisoned inside a mental facility, designed to look like her own former Caprican apartment. While there, a Leoben model tries to convince her they are destined to be lovers. For four months Starbuck denies his advances, killing him several times despite knowing he would be back. Then she is presented with a young girl named Kacey that Leoben claims is their daughter, created with the ovary removed when she was in the egg farm. Initially, she refuses to believe it and wants nothing to do with the girl, but when Kacey is badly injured in a fall down a staircase, she calls on Leoben for help and seems to grow more attached to both of them. During the uprising on New Caprica, however, Starbuck once again kills Leoben and escapes with Kacey.

In the episode "Exodus" Part II, it is revealed Kacey is not Starbuck's child; the Cylons had abducted her. Kacey and her real mother are reunited on the Galactica's flight deck after the flight from New Caprica. Starbuck is left there alone on the flight deck, stunned and in disbelief.

=== Back with the fleet ===
After her situation on New Caprica and the truth about Kacey, she is left simmering with rage, which causes her to be reckless and destructive, almost killing herself in a Viper training exercise. After being removed from flight status by then-Major Lee Adama, she takes up residence in the pilot's mess along with Colonel Tigh, drinking and lowering the morale of Galactica's pilots by attempting to draw divisions between New Capricans and those who stayed with the fleet. Admiral Adama gives her an ultimatum; either straighten up and act like an officer or 'get the hell off his ship' and find another ship to live on. Starbuck changes her attitude after Adama literally knocks her to the ground after she thumbs her nose at him.

Starbuck's relationship with Lee Adama takes another dramatic turn after she angrily challenges him to a brutal and emotional boxing match aboard Galactica. Their intense feelings for each other soon lead to an affair drawing resentment from their respective spouses. However, when Lee asks Starbuck to divorce Sam, she refuses due to her strong religious beliefs on the sacrament of marriage. Lee argues she is breaking her vows just by being with him, but Starbuck states she's merely bending the rules. Lee then decides he can no longer cheat while still married to Dualla. Later, Lee and Anders begin to voice their dislike for each other just as Starbuck's Raptor is shot down by the Cylons and she is reported missing. Anders vows to find her, but their position is outnumbered; Lee orders Anders at gunpoint to stay put and help defend their outnumbered position. Anders remains defiant.

Starbuck suffers severe hand burns in the crash and is rescued by Dualla. After they escape the doomed algae planet, Starbuck makes one final effort to have a relationship with Lee, this time offering to leave Anders if he will leave Dualla. Lee chooses to try to make his own marriage work instead.

Kara's experiences with Leoben, as well as her troubled childhood, eventually come back to haunt her. She has nightmares involving both Leoben and the mandala supposedly connected to her "destiny". She asks an oracle about her dreams and is told Leoben understands her better than she understands herself, and he will show her "destiny."

During a patrol over a gas giant where the fleet is refueling, she sees a Cylon Raider and pursues it into a storm system which resembles her mandala. She is forced to abandon the pursuit when her Viper is at risk of implosion from the pressure. Although she felt several impacts during her pursuit, then-Chief Galen Tyrol finds no damage to her Viper and gun camera footage showed no evidence of any Raider, leading many to believe Kara had been hallucinating.

Adama is concerned Kara might have burned out, but he leaves the decision to ground her up to Apollo as CAG. Apollo decides to give her another chance and offers to fly as her wingman on her next patrol. During the patrol, Starbuck sees another Raider and again pursues. Her Viper is hit by debris and she is knocked out. She experiences a conversation with an Avatar with the appearance of Leoben set in her apartment on Caprica. The avatar forces Kara to confront her past, the abuse she received from her mother, and the guilt she feels for leaving her mother to die alone. The avatar comments Kara has been running from her past just as she has been running away from death for her entire life and implies that eventually, she will have to confront her fears and her "destiny". Moments before regaining consciousness in her Viper, Kara realizes the person she is speaking to is not the Cylon Leoben Conoy, and states, "You're not Leoben." The avatar grins and replies, "Never said I was." She awakens in her Viper cockpit as Apollo is calling for her to break off and ascend, or the atmospheric pressure will kill her. Starbuck keeps flying into the storm and tells Lee to leave her. She is encompassed by white light and certain calmness. Apollo witnesses her Viper imploding, with no sign that she survived.

In the cliffhanger Season 3 finale, "Crossroads, Part II", Starbuck reappears in the same Viper that she was flying at the time she disappeared and is discovered by Apollo, appearing to be alive and well, but the reason for her sudden resurrection has yet to be revealed. She tells Apollo not to "freak out" - it is really her and she has been to Earth and will show them the way.

Kara returns in Season 4 believing she had only been absent for six hours, but Anders informs her she was really gone for two months. The crew is wary of her return except for Lee, who greets her with an enthusiastic and long hug, and is so grateful for her return he is willing to overlook the possibility she is a Cylon, and he may be willing to accept her even as a Cylon. This becomes evident in Lee's questioning of his father whether if it had been his son, Lee's brother, who returned, would it have made a difference whether he was Cylon or human. She experiences frustration upon her return to Galactica, as no one believes it is really her, and because of President Roslin's refusal to be guided by what she believes is a Cylon trick. The crew continues on the course Roslin had previously decided upon and move further away from the area Kara believes is Earth's true location. She attempts to encourage Adama to follow her suggestions, but when he refuses, she fears his being romantically linked to Roslin has unjustly influenced him. Feeling hopeless and fearing as they make more jumps farther away, she will lose the "feeling" of Earth's location, she becomes desperate and holds President Roslin at gunpoint.

During her standoff with the President, she tries to reason with her and appeal to her emotions. She hands the gun to Roslin and insists she shoot her if she really believes she is a Cylon, to which Roslin responds to by saying "They made you perfect, didn't they?" Roslin fires the gun, but misses Starbuck and hits a framed portrait of herself and Adama.

Starbuck is thrown into the brig and has a hostile confrontation with Adama, who angrily says, "You are so stupid you couldn't wait. You just lost your best ally. Now who is going to save you?" She responds, "Well, it certainly isn't you," and says she will fight to show them Earth's location until her death. She also accuses him of playing "wet nurse" to the president, to which he responds by throwing her to the floor and leaving her crying.

Later, after Adama attempts to have a conversation with Roslin, which turns into a psychological sparring argument, he rethinks his decision and allows Kara to secretly look for Earth on a barge called Demetrius.

=== Aboard Demetrius - Looking for Earth ===
After taking command of Demetrius to find a way to Earth, Starbuck finds herself at odds with the crew when her orders cause them to doubt her command ability. With only two days remaining until the ship must return to the Fleet, her command is further compromised by her refusal to explain her actions and her decision to bring the Cylon Leoben aboard after having found him in a damaged Cylon Heavy Raider. Eventually, she finds herself torn between following Leoben's advice to forge an alliance with the fragmented Cylons, or distrusting him because of what that risk entails. The tension with the crew leads to a mutiny, after which Kara acknowledges her errors and instead takes a small crew with her in a Raptor to visit the base ship. There, she meets with the base star's hybrid and is told, "You are the harbinger of death, Kara Thrace. You will lead them all to their end." This echoes the warning given by the first hybrid to Kendra Shaw at the conclusion of Razor.

=== Earth ===
In "Sometimes a Great Notion", Starbuck and Leoben look for the Colonial beacon which led them to Earth. They find the wreckage of a Viper with Starbuck's tail number and what appears to be her charred corpse. Both Kara and Leoben are shocked by this discovery and do not understand what it means. After removing the dog tags and wedding ring, Kara asks "If that's me lying there, then what am I?". He responds by backing away as if recoiling from the realization that she is indeed the "Harbinger of Death." She returns to the wrecked Viper and, after carefully wrapping the remains in a parachute shawl, she incinerates the body on a funeral pyre.

Starbuck's description as "the harbinger of death" and Leoben's caution to her not to venture into the woods, "you might not like what you find," were elements of the episode's homage to the original Planet of the Apes. Dr. Zaius gave Colonel Taylor the same warning, and instructed Dr. Cornelius to read from the sacred scrolls that man was the harbinger of death. Like Taylor, Starbuck was a human astronaut and military officer exploring a post-apocalyptic Earth.

=== Mutiny ===
In "The Oath", Captain Thrace discovers civilians and a few mutinous Marines and crewmen arming themselves for battle. She rushes back to her quarters to prepare for battle, grabbing her sidearms and ammunition. Kara then finds Lieutenant Margaret "Racetrack" Edmondson, Charlie Conner, and a few others preparing to execute Lee Adama. She kills a Marine holding Adama and wounds Lieutenant Hamish "Skulls" McCall. Along with Lee Adama, Kara runs into several other loyal Colonials including President Roslin, Admiral Adama, and Colonel Tigh. While searching for Adama, Kara and Lee free loyalists found in the brig, including Anders, who is then shot by a mutinous Marine upon leaving. Kara, refusing to leave his side, pressures Lee and those who escaped to leave her in order for them to search for Adama.

=== The song ===
In the episode "Someone to Watch Over Me", Starbuck encounters a pianist in Joe's Bar who is trying to compose a new song. At first, she becomes annoyed by his repetitious playing, stating he reminds her of her father when he did nothing but play the piano and she mentions how her father left her and her mother to pursue it as a career. Over the course of the episode, Starbuck befriends the pianist and ends up working with him to try to finish his song.

Toward the end, the piano player writes down the notes Starbuck hums out on a sheet of paper. The pattern reminds Starbuck of a drawing of coloured dots the Cylon-Human child, Hera Agathon, had given to her earlier. She lines the child's drawing up with the notes the composer had drawn, and they match exactly.

When Starbuck and the pianist play the notes, the song is instantly recognized by Saul Tigh and Tory Foster – who are sitting at a nearby table with Ellen Tigh – as the song ("All Along the Watchtower") they heard in their heads when they learned they were the final Cylons. Ellen, of course, remembers it from Earth. A bewildered Saul asks Starbuck where she heard the song. Starbuck responds she played it as a kid and begins to mention her father, but stops short when she realizes the piano player, her father, was either a figment of her imagination or a vision.

In the episode "Daybreak, Part I" Starbuck tries to get answers from Anders about the song, even turning notes into numbers to see if there is a mathematical solution.

In "Daybreak, Part II and III", after getting the coordinates from Anders for the Cylon Colony, Starbuck joins in on the rescue mission for Hera. After saving Hera, and as the Colony is being destroyed, Starbuck is ordered by Admiral Adama to jump the Galactica away to safety. Although she has no coordinates, Adama tells her to make a blind jump to anywhere. Recalling the musical notes and the numbers she extrapolated from it, she inputs them into the computer; the resulting jump puts Galactica near a habitable planet the fleet decides to settle on. It is revealed this new planet is our world, some 150,000 years ago; Admiral Adama names it "Earth", believing it better matched the dream the fleet had been seeking than did the original Earth (which had been found destroyed by nuclear war).

Once settled on the world, Kara says a final goodbye to Admiral Adama and tells Lee she's leaving - her 'job is done', having indeed led the human race to their end (the end of their journey) - and will not be coming back. Kara then disappears into thin air and is not seen again. Seeing her gone, Lee tells her ghost she "won't be forgotten", echoing a moment from the "Daybreak" episodes. What really happened to Kara is left ambiguous. According to Katee Sackhoff, "So when she at the end was saying goodbye to [Anders], I think that she was saying goodbye to their bodily forms," she said. "I think she knew, especially if he says, 'I'll see you on the other side,' I think she's with him. I think they're both dead, but I think she's with him. That was a decision that we made, because I selfishly wanted her at peace, and the only way to do that was to have her with someone at the end, or to be with the person she wanted to be with. I don't know. That's kind of where I think she is. She's with Anders playing pyramid in the sky somewhere."

== Casting ==
There was considerable outrage from fans of the original series when producers announced their intention to re-cast Starbuck and Boomer as women, with the decision to change Starbuck's gender especially controversial due to the character's popularity. Ronald D. Moore recounts: "When [the fans] heard Starbuck was going to be a woman, it was just like, There can never be peace between us! Blood has been spilled! We just decided that we didn't care." Moore explains the gender switch: "Making Starbuck a woman was a way of avoiding what I felt would be 'rogue pilot with a heart of gold' cliché."

Producers were looking for a mid-30s actress with a tough military demeanor for the role. Katee Sackhoff was not quite who they had envisaged, being a very feminine 23-year-old in real life. However, they were impressed by her acting ability. Director Michael Rymer explains: "Katee came in and my first reaction was, Well, she's the best actress, but she's too feminine." Katee Sackhoff admits: "Up to that point, I had always played pretty stereotypical blond roles. This was definitely a stretch for me. I wear high heels and dresses. I am a total girly girl. Now people avoid me at the gym."

Executive producer David Eick recounts:

I was at home, looking at old tapes of auditions, just bemoaning the fact that we didn't have a Starbuck. It was the most talked-about role; this was not the role to fall on our faces with. Jenny, my wife, happened to be in the room when Katee was reading, and in an off-hand kind of way said, What's the matter with you, she's right there! I was like, Really? We brought [Katee] back, and it was like, Oh! She's right!

Executive producer Ronald D. Moore wrote, "Katee auditioned for the role along with many other actresses, and simply blew them all away. Sometimes we get lucky."

For Sackhoff, the reaction to the reimagined role was difficult at first. "At the start, I was young; I was stupid," said Sackhoff. "I let the fact that people questioned whether or not a woman could play a man's role dictate how I was going to play her." Fans opposed to the casting of a female in the popular role expressed their discontent during production on the miniseries, and Sackhoff even received a death threat before the start of filming. During the 2004 San Diego Comic Con, the actress was booed:

I was booed. It was lovely. At that point, I'd seen the miniseries and I knew I'd done a good job. I had my confidence back. I didn't care anymore.

== Critical response ==
Despite the initial backlash, even by original male portrayer Dirk Benedict, Katee Sackhoff's Starbuck has become one of the show's most popular characters.

Seattle Post-Intelligencer's Melanie McFarland notes: "[Starbuck], played with a tomboyish swagger by Katee Sackhoff, is fast becoming the latest in a long line of feminist television icons." Wired's Hugh Hart praises Sackhoff's portrayal: "The actress's rough-and-tumble take on the fleet's most mesmerizing fighter jock will doubtless continue to render gender utterly irrelevant." Entertainment Weekly's Jeff Jensen states: "Sackhoff has set TV's new standard for action-heroine cool and complexity." Mary McNamara of the Los Angeles Times praised Sackhoff for creating one of the most fabulous female characters on television.

Salon.com's Laura Miller states:

Starbuck is blond, cocky, insubordinate, a cigar-chomping, card-playing showoff; another stock figure, really, with roots as far back as Shakespeare's Hotspur – if not for a clever twist. In the original series, Starbuck was played by Dirk Benedict; in the new version, it's Katee Sackhoff, a gender switch that knocks the character well out of type.

In 2005, Sackhoff won the Saturn Award for Best Television Supporting Actress. Slate magazine named the character as one of the reasons they were looking forward to the return of the show in fall 2007.

In a TV special to familiarize viewers with the series, Benedict and Sackhoff appeared together to discuss her character. Benedict offered an olive branch, saying, "Can a Starbuck buy a Starbuck a Starbuck?"
