= Falling Skies season 3 =

Falling Skies
- Season 3
- Region 1 DVD cover art
- Starring: Noah Wyle; Moon Bloodgood; Drew Roy; Connor Jessup; Maxim Knight; Seychelle Gabriel; Mpho Koaho; Sarah Carter; Colin Cunningham; Doug Jones; Will Patton
- No. of episodes: 10

Release
- Original network: TNT
- Original release: June 9 – August 4, 2013

Season chronology
- ← Previous; Season 2 Next → Season 4

The third season of the American television drama series Falling Skies was renewed on July 11, 2012, for a total of 10 episodes. The season premiered on June 9 and ended on August 4, 2013. On July 2, 2013, TNT renewed the show for a fourth season.

== Cast and characters ==
=== Main ===
- Noah Wyle as Tom Mason
- Moon Bloodgood as Anne Glass
- Drew Roy as Hal Mason
- Connor Jessup as Ben Mason
- Maxim Knight as Matt Mason
- Seychelle Gabriel as Lourdes
- Mpho Koaho as Anthony
- Sarah Sanguin Carter as Maggie
- Colin Cunningham as John Pope
- Doug Jones as Cochise Volm Ambassador
- Will Patton as Dan Weaver

=== Recurring ===
- Jessy Schram as Karen Nadler
- Gloria Reuben as Marina Peralta
- Dale Dye as Jim Porter
- Robert Sean Leonard as Roger Kadar
- Laci J. Mailey as Jeanne Weaver
- Megan Danso as Deni
- Matt Frewer as Cole Bressler
- Luciana Carro as Crazy Lee
- Ryan Robbins as Tector
- Brad Kelly as Lyle
- Luvia Petersen as Catherine Fisher
- Stephen Collins as Benjamin Hathaway
- Jared Keeso as Lars

=== Special Guest ===
- Peter Shinkoda as Dai (1 episode)

== Episodes ==
No. overall	No. in season	Title	Directed by	Written by	Original release date	US viewers (millions)
21	1	"On Thin Ice"	Greg Beeman	Remi Aubuchon	June 9, 2013	4.21
Seven months after the arrival of the 2nd Mass and the alien race, the Volm, the resistance continues to fight – and win – against the alien invaders following alliances with the Volm and rebel Skitters. Tom has been elected president of the New United States in Charleston, working as closely with Volm Ambassador Cochise and newcomer Marina Peralta as he does with Weaver. Tensions and suspicions rise when a spy is suspected in their midst; Arthur Manchester is given the task of finding him, but an assassin shoots him dead. Hal has become paralysed (caused by fighting the alien probe implanted in his brain) despite this he has been sleepwalking to meet with Karen, but he believes he is dreaming the nightmarish visits. Anne gives birth to Alexis Glass-Mason, her daughter with Tom.
22	2	"Collateral Damage"	James Marshall	Bradley Thompson & David Weddle	June 9, 2013	4.21
Tom organizes a strike to take out a local nuclear power station which the Espheni Overlords will use to fuel up the lethal mega mechs stored there. He enlists the help of nuclear specialist Dr. Roger Kadar on how to destroy the reactor safely without causing radioactive contamination. Meanwhile, the spy attempts to derail Tom's strike but is fed false information. Weaver's team create a diversionary attack, while Tom's team attempt to sneak in and plant explosive charges. Kadar shuts down the reactor and they blow up the power station. Later, Cochise warns of an imminent attack on Charleston by the Espheni. Alexis develops very precociously and Matt gradually comes to accept Anne as his mother. Maggie discovers Hal sleepwalking while Karen watches from a distance.
23	3	"Badlands"	David Solomon	John Wirth	June 16, 2013	2.79
Charleston is attacked by a group of soldiers, including Lt. Fisher, who are later revealed to be working for the thought-dead President of the United States, Benjamin Hathaway. Crazy Lee is critically injured during the battle. As Matt spends time by Lee's side before she dies, Anne becomes increasingly concerned that something may be wrong with Alexis. It is suspected that Anne might be suffering from post-natal depression/psychosis. Hal reveals to Maggie that he has been meeting Karen and suspects he might be the mole, and decides to turn himself in. Tom unveils the Liberty Tree to the citizens of Charleston, revealing that the names of the people who have died during the invasion will be hung from it. An explosion rocks Charleston and Espheni ships fly overhead. Alexis smiles.
24	4	"At All Costs"	Greg Beeman	Heather V. Regnier	June 23, 2013	3.55
After repelling the Espheni attack on Charleston thanks to Volm technology, Tom, with the help of Lt. Fisher, makes contact with President Benjamin Hathaway and later decides to travel to "Keystone" to meet him along with Pope, Fisher, Bressler, and their Volm ally, Cochise. After being met with suspicion by the President and his troops, Tom explains the situation and is later asked to remain with him. Meanwhile Anne continues her suspicion about her baby Alexis and enlists the help of Dr. Roger Kadar to run some DNA tests under the guise that he's actually testing the children de-harnessed by the Volm machine. After earlier being offered the chance to have his harness removed, Ben and his friend Deni decide to remain as they are for now. Hal continues to struggle with the effect of the implant placed inside him and is later taken over. Anne, after striking Dr. Kadar and drugging Lourdes, flees Charleston after finding out that Alexis is part-alien. Anne tries to flee when confronted by a Skitter and a harnessed child in the woods, but is stopped by Hal. When the President's position is under attack by Espheni ships, Tom, Bressler, and Pope are forced to leave on Pope's plane, leaving behind Cochise with President Hathaway. As their plane is leaving the area, they are struck by an energy weapon and are forced to make a crash landing.
25	5	"Search and Recovery"	Sergio Mimica-Gezzan	Jordan Rosenberg	June 30, 2013	3.22
Tom awakens in the burning wreckage of their plane in the forest to discover Brigadier General Bressler dead and Pope unconscious. After pulling Pope from the plane, they discover that the Espheni and the Skitters are searching for them. Back at Charleston, the members of the 2nd Mass discuss Anne's disappearance and come to the conclusion she may have acted out of desperation knowing how people would react to the news of her baby being part-alien. Weaver leads a search party of Hal, Ben, Matt, Jean and Maggie, but they only discover the body of a woman whom they initially believe to be Anne. They bury the woman and pay their respects. Ben discovers Skitter prints and human ones, which they believe to be Anne's. Ben tells the group that the Rebel Skitters have spies within the Espheni ranks and that this would be the best course of action to take to find Anne. Weaver agrees and calls off the search. Peralta informs Dr. Kadar that Tom asked her to approach him to ask his thoughts on the unknown machine the Volm are building. Kadar is suspicious about the machine, explaining that the power requirements are unusual. Meanwhile, Tom and Pope argue and bond by the campfire: Tom reveals that he had a hard upbringing, as his father was a mean drunk, while Pope tells of his two children and how he wound up in prison for murder. They are soon attacked by Skitters and forced to jump from a ledge into the water below. Tom's ankle is hurt and he is unable to walk, so he forces Pope to leave him behind. Pope returns later and kills two Skitters to save Tom. Pope helps Tom to a nearby car, which he drives to Charleston; they collapse at the gates. Matt bonds with Ben about what happened during the search, and Tom awakens two days later to find Pope has stayed by his side in the hospital the whole time and that Anne has disappeared.
26	6	"Be Silent and Come Out"	Adam Kane	Bradley Thompson & David Weddle & John Wirth	July 7, 2013	3.49
Tom discovers that Anne and Alexis are being held by Karen at an unknown location and decides to go look for them. Weaver informs Tom that Karen will likely use them as leverage against them and that he should stand down and wait for contact from her. Hal attacks Tom and Peralta as they discuss the Volm weapon and strikes Peralta and takes Tom hostage. As Hal attempts to flee Charleston in a Humvee, Maggie shoots the vehicle forcing Hal to take Tom hostage in a near by building. The 2nd Mass surround the building and attempt to negotiate with Hal after finding out he was implanted with an eye bug by Karen. Inside the building Hal continues to demand information on the Volm weapon and offers the release of Anne and Alexis. Tom initially refuses and tries to connect with Hal by talking about the past, how his mother thought he would be a fighter pilot but he was unsure. Meanwhile, Matt suggests a route into the building that would be safe and Maggie and Ben decide to go along with him. Tom provokes an emotional reaction from Hal as slowly one after another Maggie, Ben and Matt enter the room. Hal is later taken to hospital and Tom is informed by a Rebel skitter of a dangerous remedy that will rid Hal of the eye bug, and is told that as it hasn't been tested on humans they're unsure of the result and if Hal doesn't have an eye bug inside his brain it could kill him. After deciding to go along with the treatment, Hal is cured but during the procedure his heart stops. Hal awakens later on and informs Tom and Maggie that his last memory was of wanting to go to Tom and inform him that he might be the mole just over a week ago. Tom discovers from a Rebel skitter the location where Anne and Alexis are being held and later offers his resignation as president to Peralta, along with documents detailing everything about the Volm weapon and where it will be deployed, called Project Orange. As Tom leads a rescue team out of Charleston consisting of Matt, Ben and Hal. Peralta is sworn in as the President of the New United States.
27	7	"The Pickett Line"	Sergio Mimica-Gezzan	Heather V. Regnier & Jordan Rosenberg	July 14, 2013	3.33
Whilst en route to finding both Anne and Alexis, Tom and the boys are robbed of both supplies and horses by a local family. Enraged by this, the Masons track them down to a local farm where they regain control of their supplies. However, a struggle ensues between Hal and one of the brothers, and Matt shoots him and critically wounds him. After the brother dies, Tom, Hal, Ben and Matt leave and continue their journey in finding Anne and Alexis. But, they soon find that Skitters and Mechs are on their way to the farm. Tom decides to go back where he finds the house empty and is confronted by the Skitters and the Mechs. Meanwhile, Cochise brings an injured President Hathaway back to Charleston for medical attention. With Cochise back, Marina uses this opportunity to question him about the Volm weapon that is being built for the upcoming attack against the Espheni. Cochise explains that the weapon will be used against the soon to be activated Espheni planetary defense grid, that when activated will envelope the Earth and wipe out all human life on the Earth within 3 months by irradiating the planet's surface. He later explains that the weapon will inject a massive amount of energy into the grid in the hope it will overload and destroy it, and explains that there is a risk that if it is unsuccessful the irradiation process will be accelerated and that all human life on the surface could be lost. President Hathaway is murdered in his hospital bed by the real mole, who is revealed to be Lourdes acting under Espheni mind-control via eye worms under her skin. Peralta and Weaver come to the conclusion that Hal wasn't the mole, and suspect someone at Charleston was involved with the murder.
28	8	"Strange Brew"	David Solomon	John Wirth	July 21, 2013	3.74
Tom awakens next to his wife Rebecca to discover he has been living an ordinary but perfect life as a college professor and as a father to his three sons in a world that has not been invaded by the Espheni. Things were going well for him until he starts to receive messages from Anne Glass that imply he is having an affair behind his wife's back. But with no memory of the 2nd Mass, Anne or the alien invasion, he becomes increasingly concerned that he's been living somebody else's life. As a result his world starts to fall apart around him. When four locations are made exceedingly clear to him, he begins to suspect something is not quite right and awakens from the dream to find out that Karen was trying to manipulate him into revealing the location where the Volm weapon will be used. When seemingly he is rescued and shoots Karen dead, he awakens later in Charleston and heads to the briefing room to find four maps of locations seen in his dream and realizes he is still being manipulated by Karen. Breaking free from the dream he awakens in the real world to discover that Karen has had Anne and Alexis killed. After breaking down in tears and initially trying to attack Karen, he is later shown the activation of the Espheni planetary defense grid. He then escapes by jumping from the ledge, using a Skitter to break his fall. After traveling to his old house, he dreams of his wife, and is told to move forward with his life and that there was nothing left for him there. Meanwhile back in Charleston suspicions are cast over Peralta when an explosion destroys the only radio that can contact President Hathaway's forces, almost killing Weaver. After initially being refused permission to join the front line troops in the upcoming operation, Maggie, after saving Weaver's life, has her request accepted. Meanwhile Hal, Matt and Ben return to Charleston without Tom, but believe their father will return home.
29	9	"Journey to Xibalba"	Jonathan Frakes	Bradley Thompson & David Weddle	July 28, 2013	3.06
Tom finally returns to Charleston, where he relays the news of Anne and Alexis' deaths, as well as the fact that the Boston tower is vulnerable to an assault and should be the target of their attack. However, his ulterior motive is to get revenge on Karen. Unfortunately, the Volm complex is suddenly destroyed in a massive explosion, with Cochise being the only survivor. Weaver and Peralta suspect it is the work of the mole. Meanwhile, a heavily wounded Cochise tells Tom that he will eventually regenerate from his wounds. Lourdes overhears this conversation and decides to try and assassinate Cochise. She plants another bomb that severely damages the Charleston mall, causing numerous cave ins and blocking off all of the exits. Hal and Maggie are trapped in the armory, and nearly suffocate until they are rescued by Ben and Matt. Hal, realizing that Maggie is angry at him for leaving her behind to search for Anne and Alexis, promises to allow her to accompany him when they hunt down Karen. Meanwhile, Tom realizes Lourdes is the mole when she accidentally reveals her knowledge of Anne's death in Boston. She is immediately restrained before she can assassinate Cochise. Tom then takes Lourdes's weapon and uses it to blast a hole at one of the exits, opening up an escape route. Afterwards, Tom talks with a fully healed Cochise. Tom assures him that even with the complex destroyed and all of Cochise's comrades dead, the weapon itself should still be intact. They just need to dig it out and figure out how to operate it.
30	10	"Brazil"	Greg Beeman	Remi Aubuchon	August 4, 2013	3.74
After having finally dug the Volm weapon out of the rubble it was buried under, the 2nd Mass stages its attack. While Weaver leads a diversionary attack on the Chicago tower, Tom assaults the Boston tower with the Volm weapon and manages to destroy it, shutting down the Espheni defense grid. With the defense grid down, the promised Volm reinforcements finally arrive in a gigantic city-sized ship that destroys the remains of Boston when it lands. It is then revealed that the Volm reinforcements are being led by Cochise's father. Unfortunately, while the 2nd Mass is celebrating their victory, Tom and Weaver discover that the Volm intend to keep the humans out of the war by shipping them off to relative safety in Brazil. Angry at being deprived of their chance to fight for their planet, Tom and Weaver object. Tom is taken into custody and Weaver is forced to surrender the 2nd Mass to the Volm. However, Cochise's father is intrigued by the humans' eagerness to fight, and Tom and Cochise manage to convince him to let the 2nd Mass go; the Volm stand down and allow the humans to fight the Espheni also, despite the great dangers they still face. The 2nd Mass is beginning the long trek back to Charleston when an Espheni ship lands nearby. Karen then reveals herself, offering a truce (as the Espheni are weakened) and telling Tom that the Volm cannot be trusted. Tom responds by vengefully shooting Karen, fatally wounding her. Hal tends to a dying Karen, whom Maggie finishes off with her gun. Tom then discovers that Anne and Alexis are in fact still alive- Karen had brought them to him as a gesture of good faith for her truce. However, as Tom reunites with Anne, he is shocked to see that Alexis has grown to the equivalent of a six-year-old in just two months. When they return to the regiment's camp, Alexis comes across Lourdes and, through some unknown means, extracts and destroys the eye worms infecting her with her bare hands, to the amazement of Tom and Weaver.

== Production ==
=== Development ===
On July 11, 2012, the series was renewed for a third season, consisting of 10 episodes and premiered on June 9, 2013. Writer and co-executive producer Mark Verheiden disclosed that he would not return to the series for the third season.

=== Casting ===
On August 23, 2012, it was reported that House veteran Robert Sean Leonard and E.R. actress Gloria Reuben had joined the season's recurring cast as Roger Kadar and Marina Peralta, respectively. Actress Jessy Schram recurred as Karen Nadler during the season. Hellboy's Doug Jones portrayed the new alien introduced at the end of the season two finale, "A More Perfect Union". 7th Heaven veteran Stephen Collins portrayed Benjamin Hathaway, the current president of the United States, in the season's fourth and seventh episode.

=== Filming ===
Principal photography for the season began on August 22, 2012, and concluded December 21, 2012, in Vancouver, British Columbia.

== Reception ==
=== Ratings ===
Episode number	Title	Original air date	Ratings share (Adults 18–49)	Viewers (in millions)	Rank per week on Cable
1	"On Thin Ice"	June 9, 2013	1.5	4.21	#2
2	"Collateral Damage"	June 9, 2013	1.5	4.21	#2
3	"Badlands"	June 16, 2013	1.0	2.79	#3
4	"At All Costs"	June 23, 2013	1.1	3.55	#4
5	"Search and Recovery	June 30, 2013	1.1	3.22	#6
6	"Be Silent and Come Out"	July 7, 2013	1.2	3.49	#3
7	"The Pickett Line"	July 14, 2013	1.1	3.33	#4
8	"Strange Brew"	July 21, 2013	1.3	3.74	#5
9	"Journey to Xibalba"	July 28, 2013	1.0	3.06	#7
10	"Brazil"	August 4, 2013	1.2	3.74	#4
