= Julian and the Wind =

2024 Canadian short film writte, directed and edited by Connor Jessup

- Directed by: Connor Jessup
- Written by: Connor Jessup
- Produced by: Connor Jessup; Ashley Shields-Muir
- Starring: David Webster; Joel Oulette; James Gerald Hicks
- Cinematography: John Ker
- Edited by: Connor Jessup
- Music by: Casey Manierka-Quaile
- Production companies: Big & Quiet Pictures
- Distributed by: La Distributrice de films
- Release date: September 6, 2024 (TIFF)
- Running time: 15 minutes
- Country: Canada
- Language: English

Julian and the Wind is a Canadian short drama film, written and directed by Connor Jessup and released in 2024. The film stars David Webster as Arthur, a boarding school student whose unrequited love for his roommate Julian (Joel Oulette) becomes transformed into a deeper connection when Julian begins sleepwalking.

The film premiered at the 2024 Toronto International Film Festival.

The film was named to TIFF's annual Canada's Top Ten list for 2024.
