= List of Falling Skies characters =

Falling Skies characters

Principal Falling Skies cast members (l-r): Will Patton, Drew Roy, Connor Jessup, Noah Wyle, Maxim Knight and Moon Bloodgood

This is a list of characters from the TNT science fiction television series Falling Skies.

The main character is history professor Tom Mason, played by Noah Wyle, who becomes an action hero battling an alien invasion. His second in command is Desert Storm veteran Captain Weaver, played by Will Patton. Much of the show explores relationships between fathers and sons, including Weaver's relationship with Mason, and Tom Mason's own relationship with his three sons.

One of the female supporting characters is Anne Glass (Moon Bloodgood), who is a doctor and the main romantic love interest for Tom.

In 2011, Entertainment Weekly called John Pope, played by Colin Cunningham, the show's "most interesting character...as twitchy and sarcastic as Tom and Weaver are sincere". He is the leader of a band of marauders.

== Main characters ==
Name	Actor	Starring seasons	Recurring/guest seasons
Tom Mason	Noah Wyle	1–5	
Tom is a former Boston University military-history professor and becomes the second-in-command of the Second Massachusetts Militia Regiment, a group of civilians and fighters fleeing Boston. He has three sons (Hal, Ben, and Matt), and his wife is killed by Skitters. Tom befriends Anne Glass, eventually becoming romantically involved with her. At the end of season one, he boards an alien shuttle with Hal's girlfriend Karen and one of the Espheni in the hope of stopping the changes to Ben from his captivity earlier in the season. Tom is eventually freed, and finds his way back home. Between seasons two and three, he is elected president of the New United States. Tom continues to fight with the 2nd Mass, seeing himself as a military leader who belongs on the front line. He marries Anne in season three and they have a daughter, Alexis (Lexi). Due to interference by the invaders while the pregnant Anne was held hostage, Lexi is a hybrid of human-alien DNA. Season four finds Tom in a concentration camp similar to the ghettos of the World War II era. After the destruction of the Espheni power core and being contacted by the Dornia, Tom begins to rally humanity against the Espheni, leading a march to Washington, DC where the Espheni Queen is. In a final confrontation with the Espheni Queen at the Lincoln Memorial, Tom infects the Espheni with a Dornia bioweapon, wiping them out and freeing the Earth. While Tom is offered to be the new leader of a united humanity, he repeatedly refuses the offer.
Anne Glass	Moon Bloodgood	1–5	
Anne, a doctor for the 2nd Mass, was a pediatrician before the invasion. She is sympathetic to the civilians, and believes that everything possible should be done to help them. Her husband and son were killed at home in the invasion bombings. In season two Anne and Tom begin a relationship and have a daughter, Alexis. Anne and Alexis are captured by the Espheni, and released to the 2nd Mass. After the attack which scatters the regiment, she becomes de facto commander in the absence of Tom and Col. Weaver. She later marries Tom and they have a daughter, Alexis Glass-Mason who is half-Espheni. Anne is killed in the final assault on Washington, D.C., but is resurrected by the Dornia. Months later, she is still happily with Tom and once again pregnant.
Hal Mason	Drew Roy	1–5	
Hal (age 16) is Tom's oldest son, who scouts for the 2nd Mass. After his girlfriend Karen is captured the former lacrosse player connects with tough newcomer Maggie, who helped free him and his father's squad from Pope's outlaws. Although she is reluctant, he kisses her and she eventually returns his feelings. Hal becomes paralyzed in season three, losing the ability to walk. Karen implants a probe in him, and it affects him deeply; he thinks he is meeting her in his dreams, but in reality he is meeting her at night to tell her his father's plans. The implant eventually takes over completely, but is retrieved when Hal is exposed as a mole. By season four Hal is his father's second-in-command, leading the ghetto resistance while Tom is held in solitary confinement. In the series finale, Hal proposes to Maggie during the final battle and she accepts. Months after the invasion, they are shown to be happily engaged.
Ben Mason	Connor Jessup	1–5	
Tom's second son, who was captured by the Skitters, in the pilot Hal sees Ben controlled by a spinal harness. Although he was rescued, he still hears aliens communicate on fluctuating radio frequencies. Stronger and needing little sleep, according to Hal he is no longer the bookish science nerd that he was. The spiky stubs in his spine still glow, despite the removal of the harness with a blowtorch, and his chemical changes make him convince his father to accompany the alien overlord at the end of season one. In season two Ben joins the fight, but he helps the rebel skitters by communicating with them with his spikes. In season three he continues helping the rebel skitters, and grows close to Deni. After the 2nd Mass is attacked, Ben is in a safe zone in Chinatown where humans are not attacked by the aliens because of his half-sister's presence. After the destruction of the Espheni power core, Ben continues to aid in the fight with the Espheni. Due to his spikes, Ben is able to connect to the Espheni Shadow Plane and discover the existence of the Espheni Queen and her location. Ben survives the war and is last seen speaking with the Volm delegation at months later.
Matt Mason	Maxim Knight	1–5	
Although Tom's youngest son makes a birthday wish in season one that everything returns to the way it was before the invasion, Matt volunteers to help Scott with the radio and Pope with making ammunition. In season two Matt participates more in the fighting, protecting Anne, and in season three he continues to fight. In season four he has been captured and placed in a re-education camp to brainwash young humans into believing that the Eshpeni are benevolent. After being rescued, he aids in the fight and after the war, writes a book on it. He also begins dating Evelyn.
Captain (Colonel) Dan Weaver	Will Patton	1–5	
The commander of the 2nd Mass, Weaver is a retired active and reserve military officer who served with Porter during the Gulf War. He misses his family, and learns that his wife and oldest daughter may be alive. In season two, Weaver finds his daughter; she, her boyfriend and their surviving group leave separately and reunite in Charleston. His wife died of a stroke when supplies of her blood-pressure medication ran out. Weaver's gruff exterior belies a fierce determination and loyalty to the 2nd Mass, inspiring equal loyalty from them in return. Promoted to colonel between seasons two and three, he is a key advisor to Tom Mason in his role as President of the New United States. Weaver is trapped in the ghetto with Tom and Hal, and his daughter has been missing since the attack on the 2nd Mass. He finds her turned into a Skitter, but she retains her humanity and sacrifices herself to save him. He follows Tom as he leads the militias in a march on Washington, D.C., and is reunited with an old lover, Captain Katie Marshall. After she turns a hunt for collaborators into a witch hunt, Weaver is forced to kill her and discovers that the woman he loved died weeks ago and was replaced by an Espheni clone. Weaver takes part in the final assault as part of the strike team that goes after the Espheni Queen directly and survives the war.
Maggie May	Sarah Carter	1–5	
Maggie, once a reluctant part of Pope's gang, kills his brother and another rapist ("He thought he was better because he brought chocolate - he wasn't") and rescues Tom, Hal and their squad. A tough fighter, she teaches Anne to shoot and works hard to earn her new place. Maggie tells Hal that she knows the hospital where the harnessed Ben is held, because she was hospitalized there with cancer at 16. In "Death March" she says that after chemotherapy for brain cancer she fled, but was arrested when she was three months pregnant and gave birth in jail. In season three, Maggie and Hal begin a relationship and are happy; she protects him when she learns that Hal might be the mole. Maggie is in the Chinatown safe zone with Lexi, Ben and Lourdes. In season 4, she is mortally injured in a massive Espheni attack on Chinatown and Ben gives her three of his spikes to heal her injuries. As a result, she starts to develop a romantic relationship with Ben, but eventually breaks it off and has the spikes removed. In the series finale, Hal proposes to her during the final battle and she accepts. Months later, they are shown to be happily engaged.
Lourdes Delgado	Seychelle Gabriel	1–4	
The former college student helps Anne, proudly displaying her Catholicism. In season two Lourdes' romantic interest shifts from Hal to Jamil, and she is devastated when Jamil is killed by Skitters. She still helps Anne with the Charleston medical department in season three, but has been infected with eye worms which drive her to destabilize Charleston from within. Lourdes is unveiled as the mole, and her eye worms are removed by Lexi (to whom she is fanatically devoted). Lexi kills her in episode 407, "Saturday Night Massacre"; when Lexi emerges from her chrysalis she plans to leave Chinatown, disgusted with the 2nd Mass' violence. When Lourdes begs her to take her along, Lexi uses an alien power to strangle her without touching her.
John Pope	Colin Cunningham	1–5	
Leader of a post-apocalyptic gang who ambush Tom's squad when they scout an armory and kill a scout (Click) with a bow and arrow, Pope sends Hal to offer Weaver a trade: hostages returned for the gun mounted on a truck. Although Anne volunteers to return and patch up Pope's brother, Maggie kills her rapists and frees Tom's squad. Pope becomes the cook for the 2nd Mass and rides away after leading them to a motorcycle store, but helps the children escape a human traitor and makes bullets capable of killing the invading machines. His character a mixture of good and evil, in season two he leads the Berserkers (which include Lyle, Tector, Crazy Lee and Anthony). Although Pope leaves with Anthony, he returns alone to the 2nd Mass. In season three he opens a bar in Charleston, often speaking out about the alliance with the Volm and continuing to fight with the Berserkers. When Pope is in the ghetto, he returns to his mercenary ways. He later forms his own crew after disagreeing with Tom Mason's actions. Pope is apparently killed in an explosion caused by Tom Mason and Colonel Weaver during an attack on the 2nd Mass' headquarters. However, he survives, but is mortally wounded. After Tom wipes out the Espheni and loses Anne, Pope confronts him on the beach he is waiting on in hopes the Dornia will save her. Pope realizes he takes no pleasure in Tom's misery and lays down his weapon, asking Tom to kill him. Tom refuses as the war is over and he won't kill anyone else. Pope accepts this and dies soon after of his wounds.
Anthony	Mpho Koaho	1–5	
A fighter, a former Boston police officer, part of Tom's team and The Berserkers, Anthony is Anne's second-in-command. He later joins John Pope's crew due to his PTSD, but rejoins the 2nd Mass after realizing that Pope has gone too far. During the final battle, Weaver has him lead a team to hold their base in Norfolk, Virginia which he reluctantly accepts. Months later, he attends Tom's speech and is shown to be fully accepted back.
Cochise	Doug Jones	3–5	
Son of the Volm commander, Cochise is the first Volm to arrive on Earth and commands the Volm forces throughout season 3. After the destruction of the Boston mothership, his father arrives and Cochise defends humanity's right to help fight the Espheni, something the Volm never allow. Cochise and Tom are successful in convincing his father, but after an attack on the Volm fleet in another system, his father decides to leave and give up on Earth. Cochise refuses to, believing in humanity and his new friends and stays behind with a small group of Volm soldiers to continue the fight with the Espheni on Earth. Due to his interactions with the humans, Cochise changes to be more human, expressing more emotion than his original stoic personality when he appeared. In season 4, he aids the humans in their plan to destroy the Espheni power core and manages to get his father to return to lend a hand. In season 5, Cochise continues aiding the 2nd Mass' war efforts and identifies the alien Tom saw as a Dornia, a believed-to-be extinct alien race that was the first conquered by the Espheni. Cochise's health begins failing due to a failing organ and he contacts his father to say goodbye. Anne Mason suggests an organ transplant from Cochise's father to save him, but his father initially refuses, feeling that Cochise has become too human. He eventually agrees and Cochise is saved, but his father dies. Cochise aids in the march on Washington, DC and is shocked to hear about the existence of the Espheni Queen. When Tom gets a biological weapon from the Dornia, Cochise aids Anne and Marty in modifying it so that its harmless to humans. Cochise helps explain the situation to another militia leader that arrives and is part of Tom's strike team to kill the Espheni Queen. He warns of the dangers of the Espheni hatchlings and is cut-off from Tom when they attack. Cochise witnesses Anne's death and the destruction of the Espheni by the Dornia bioweapon. Months later, Cochise is part of a Volm delegation who attends Tom's speech and the choosing of a new leader for a united humanity.
Dai	Peter Shinkoda	1–2	3
A fighter who sees how Tom worries about his sons, Dai wryly says that his lack of a family at the time of the invasion had a positive side. In the season-two finale, he is killed by the Skitters.
Karen Nadler	Jessy Schram	1	2–4
A teenaged scout and Hal's ex-girlfriend, Karen is captured when Mike is freed in the mission to retrieve Ben. Harnessed and indoctrinated, she replaces the deceased overlord in season three. After Karen's plans fail she tries to forge a truce with Tom and the 2nd Mass, warning them not to trust the Volm; Tom shoots her, with Maggie delivering the final blows when Karen tells Hal she has always loved him.
Alexis (Lexi) Glass-Mason	Scarlett Byrne	4	5
Tom and Anne's daughter; due to manipulation by the Espheni during Anne's pregnancy, Lexi grows from infancy to adulthood in just over a year and possesses telekinesis, superior strength and a psychic link to her mother. She can affect alien technology, shutting down a mech when it invades the safe zone where she and other members of the 2nd Mass have taken refuge. Somewhat naive, she is manipulated by Lourdes into leading a cult of personality which sees her as a savior. Lourdes, who has developed a fanatical devotion to Lexi, tries to block opinions other than her own; this leads to conflict with Ben and Maggie. Lexi sees herself as the bridge between humanity and the invaders, a position with which she is uncomfortable and does not understand or want. She is killed in the Season 4 finale when she pilots an Espheni airship directly into the Espheni power core on the moon, destroying it. In the penultimate episode of the series, Lexi apparently returns, powerless and claiming to have been saved by the Dornia like Tom was. Due to a recent experience with an Espheni generated-clone of a person, the 2nd Mass are suspicious of her presence and story and she is locked up. Tom questions her on the Espheni plan and the Espheni Queen. Alexis explains that the Espheni Queen only comes to a planet when victory is certain and that it means the Espheni are moving from invasion to occupation. She later reveals that the Espheni have been to Earth before, but when Tom gets too close, pulls him through her cage and strangles him. Before Lexi can kill Tom, Ben hits her with a Dornia bioweapon, killing her. Before she dies and burns to ashes, Lexi warns Tom that the Espheni are onto him. Weaver realizes that Lexi really was just another clone and was created by the Espheni to get close to Tom and assassinate him before he could reach the Queen.

== Supporting characters ==
Name	Actor	Recurring seasons	Episode count
Jimmy Boland	Dylan Authors	1–2	10
The 13-year-old fighter endangers the squad when he chases a dog in season one, and becomes more capable in season two. In season two episode 3, "Compass" he dies when he is impaled on tree by a Skitter. Weaver delivers his eulogy.
Rick Thompson	Daniyah Ysrail	1–2	9
Rick, the son of fighter Mike Thompson, is saved from a harness by Anne. Mourning his father, he tells "everything" about the school defense to his Skitter "family". The Mechs attack in force, and are repelled because Tom retrieves the radio tube stolen by Rick. In season two, Boon accidentally shoots Rick instead of a Skitter.
Colonel (General) Jim Porter	Dale Dye	1–3	12
The senior resistance leader in Boston, Porter was an army officer ready to retire at the time of the invasion. Presumed dead in season one, in season 2 he leads a group in Charleston and welcomes the 2nd Mass. Porter is promoted to general between seasons two and three.
Uncle Scott	Bruce Gray	1	8
Anne's uncle teaches the children biology, fixes a tube radio and discovers that the Skitters communicate on fluctuating frequencies (also sensed by Ben). His suggested jamming repels an attack on the school. Scott dies protecting children in the Battle of Fitchburg, about a month after Tom is abducted by the overlord at the end of season one.
Mike Thompson	Martin Roach	1	5
Mike is a fighter who is killed protecting his formerly-harnessed son Rick and other children in "Sanctuary Part 2" by Terry Clayton, who lies to obtain 2nd Mass children for Skitters.
Michael Harris	Steven Weber	1	3
Harris, a surgeon, was friends with Tom and his wife but left her to die; Tom knows this because the bag of food next to her body was too heavy for her to carry herself. Harris learns to save harnessed children by leaving half the spikes inside them, giving them opiates when the harness-drug injections wear off. When Tom brings a wounded Skitter to the school, it kills Harris before the thorough examination hoped for by Porter.
Jamil Dexter	Brandon Jay McLaren	2	6
A civilian in the 2nd Mass, Jamil replaces Uncle Scott, flirts with Lourdes and dies after an attack by alien bugs. When Lourdes and Anne try to help him, he ruptures and the bugs crawl out.
Tector Murphy	Ryan Robbins	2–4	14
A fighter and Berserker, in "Death March" Tector tells Weaver he hides his rank (former USMC gunnery sergeant) because he blames himself for losing his squad in an ambush. During the Espheni assault on Chinatown, he blows himself up with C4 charges after he fails to kill the Overlord.
Lyle	Brad Kelly	2–4	17
A fighter and Berserker, Lyle is killed in the season-four premiere by a laser fence while he is protecting Matt.
Crazy Lee	Luciana Carro	2–3	9
A fighter and Berserker, she is killed when a gun blast impales her on a piece of rebar.
Boon	Billy Wickman	2	3
A fighter and Berserker, Boon is Tector's partner whom Tom scolds for using Matt as bait in a hunting mission. He accidentally kills Rick instead of a Skitter, and is shot by a Mech in front of the 2nd Mass outside a hospital.
Jeanne Weaver	Laci J. Mailey	2–4	11
The oldest daughter of Captain Weaver, Jeanne survives the initial invasion but is separated from her father. She lives with a group of children and teenagers, including her boyfriend Diego. Although when she is reunited with Weaver she decides to stay with her group rather than join the 2nd Mass, when the group is attacked she makes her way to Charleston and rejoins her father. Jeanne is captured in the season-four premiere "Ghost in the Machine" and transformed into a Skitter-like creature, a new version of shock troops for the Espheni war. Although the transformation is supposed to erase a human's free will, Jeanne overcomes the programming. Her programming flaw is discovered when she dies defending her father from a Skitter attack in season four's "Evolve or Die".
Arthur Manchester	Terry O'Quinn	2–3	3
The former leader of the Charleston survivors retires at the end of season two. Arthur knows Tom Mason, and wants his civilians hidden for safety. Charged with finding the Charleston mole, he is killed by the spy (later revealed as Lourdes, under alien control).
General Cole Bressler	Matt Frewer	2–3	7
Bressler is a Charleston military leader who wants a more-offensive approach. He declares martial law, arrests Arthur and takes over. Bressler refuses to believe in the Skitter rebellion, and orders de-harnessed kids and Skitters killed. He is killed on landing when he flies Tom and Pope back from the meeting with the real president.
Marina Peralta	Gloria Reuben	3	10
Marina, a Charleston politician, is the aide of President Tom Mason and a leader of the human resistance. Charleston's acting vice-president, she becomes president of Charleston after Tom's resignation.
Denny	Megan Danso	3–5	10
Deni, a de-harnessed human girl, fights with the Skitter rebellion and the human resistance and is close to Ben Mason. She is ultimately killed in the Season 5 premiere during the 2nd Mass's invasion of an Espheni hideout where she is ripped in half by Skitters.
Roger Kadar	Robert Sean Leonard	3–4	7
A hermit scientist living under Charleston who helped design its power grid, Roger runs the test determining that Alexis is a human-alien hybrid. In season four he is with Ben, Maggie, Lourdes and Lexi in the Chinatown refuge. Roger is impaled with a piece of glass in his side during the Espheni attack, giving samples of Lexi's DNA to Anne and Tom before he bleeds to death.

== Alien races ==
=== Skitters ===
Originally thought to be the alien species responsible for invading Earth, the Skitters are a race under control of the Overlords. Their home world was subjugated by the Overlords and the Skitters were harnessed just like the children of Earth. Some Skitters have been able to overcome their controllers and plot rebellions against the Overlords.

=== Mechs ===
Bipedal robotic drones that fight alongside the Skitters. Destroyed Mechs are entirely mechanical inside, so there is no "pilot," implying that they are unmanned drones. Those who control mechs can put them into guard/patrol mode, give special orders violating their usual protocol and assign priority targets. These commands are followed even if the commander is dead, implying that they have primitive A.I. that allows them to some extent think on their own. It seems that harnessed children can also order Mechs, such as when Karen Nadler orders a Mech to execute Boon (This implies that harnessed children have a military rank system). The Mechs, along with all other Espheni mechanized servants, are disabled when Alexis Denise Glass-Mason sacrifices herself to destroy the Espheni power core.

Mechs produce a distinct mechanical moan every now and then for reasons unknown. This is an advantage for human resistance fighters, who knew Mechs were coming before they’d arrive.

=== Harnesses ===
Are parasitic creatures that allow other races to completely control the wearer. It was not known that these were their own creature (and not just a piece of biomechanical equipment) until season 2. Their real names are chemlocks, according to Red Eye, the leader of the Skitter rebellion. In Season 4 a new type of harness is featured, used to mutate human adults into humanoid skitters. The Harnesses are permanently disabled when Alexis Denise Glass-Mason destroys the Espheni power core along with all other Espheni technology. Though de-Harnessed, Ben Mason still retains the spikes from the Harness and the enhanced abilities granted by it. It also allows him to communicate with the Espheni and Skitters and use the Espehni Shadow Plane device.

=== Espheni / "Overlords" ===
The force behind the invasion of Earth. The Espheni were introduced late in season 1. They have a very large intellectual capacity, able to control many harnessed individuals at once using merely their mind. In the Season 2 finale their actual name was introduced. The Espheni are wiped out in the series finale by Tom Mason with a Dornia bioweapon. In season 4, the Scorched Overlord reveals that part of the Espheni motivation is that they are running from their great enemy, the Dornia, and are conquering worlds to fuel their war machine. They serve a queen who states that the second reason for their attack is revenge for the death of her daughter during a failed invasion 1,500 years before the one in the series.

=== Crawlies ===
Small creatures under control of the Overlords and used to flush people out of narrow spaces, as they can eat through metal. They have only appeared in one episode, when they use Jamil Dexter's body as a Trojan Horse and crawled out when the others are near. They were mentioned in another by the end of Season 2.

=== "Eye Worms" ===
Small biomechanical parasites that hide in or near the skin covering the eye of their hosts. They appear to be designed by the Espheni for surveillance, and to turn their hosts into sleeper agents. Tom Mason, Hal Mason and Lourdes have carried eye worms. Anne Glass removes the first known eye worm from Tom Mason's eye with forceps, which causes him excruciating pain. In season 3, Volm technology can remove them without harm. Lourdes hosted several eye worms, making her kill multiple people, including the President of the United States, and causing her extreme pain until Alexis removed them.

=== Volm ===
Arriving at the very end of the final episode of season 2, Volm are a race which claims to have been at war with the Espheni for longer than most Volm have been alive. The Espheni took their planet long ago. In Season 3, the Volm set up a base by Charleston, South Carolina, and are building a weapon to take down the Espheni defense grid for reinforcements to fight the Espheni. They succeed in taking down the defense grid by destroying the mothership in Boston and Volm reinforcements arrive led by the father of Cochise, the humans' main Volm ally. The Volm force the Espheni into retreating to the northern areas of the planet and plan to force the humans into safety in camps in Brazil, but Tom Mason is able to convince the Volm leader to let them stay and fight, which the Volm never allow on planets they help. In Season 4 the greater Volm forces leave Earth to engage the Espheni, who in the meantime attacked their young and brood mates. It's later revealed that the Volm gave up on Earth after the attack on their young and the devastating counterattack on humanity, but Cochise, the Volm leader who had aided the humans since the end of season 2, refuses to give up and remains behind on Earth with a small group of soldiers to continue the fight. During the attack on the Espheni power core at the end of season 4, the Volm mothership returns in time to aid in the destruction of the power core by destroying an attacking Beamer squadron. However, the Volm are not able to find Tom Mason's Beamer after it is blown into deep space. Tom is eventually rescued by the Dornia and continues working with Cochise and his men to fight the now-weakened Espheni. While Cochise nearly dies due to a failing organ, his father saves him with an organ transplant at the cost of his own life as he believes that Cochise's survival is more important to the Volm battle plan than his own. Cochise aids the human resistance in their war with the Espheni and takes part in the assault on Washington, D.C. The Espheni are destroyed by Tom Mason in the series finale, Reborn, with a Dornia bioweapon and the Volm war with them ends. A Volm delegation including Cochise attends a united humanity's gathering to choose a new leader months after the invasion ends.

=== "Black Hornets" ===
Skitters once part of the rebellion, but now captured and controlled into mindless drones. They have the ability to fly. They are massive in size and covered in engorged, tumorlike growths. Unlike their less-evolved kin, they have blue eyes, four wings and an elongated tail. Their tails are prehensile and incredibly strong, allowing them to effortlessly carry objects as big as a grown man into the sky. A Black Hornet attack delays the 2nd Mass' attack on Washington, D.C., with the Black Hornets dropping man-made bombs on the humans before being driven off. During the final battle, Black Hornets are seen flying all over Washington. When Tom Mason kills the Espheni Queen with a Dornia bioweapon, the bioweapon spreads to all the Espheni and they die out. As a result, Black Hornets are seen exploding all over the Washington skyline.

=== Dornia / "Great Enemy" ===
Mentioned in "The Eye," this alien race drove the Espheni from their home galaxy which caused them to flee to the Milky Way Galaxy, conquering planet after planet. They are indirectly responsible for the Invasion of Earth, the Volm-Espheni War, and the enslavement of the Skitters. According to the Espheni overlord Scorch, they are fast approaching the Solar System. One Dornia appeared to Tom after his Beamer was flung to the edge of the Solar System, creating a room that mimicked his Boston bedroom. It has been identified by Cochise that the Dornia were the original species that was enslaved by the Espheni and mutated into Skitters. This Dornia returned Tom to Earth and began guiding him against the Espheni. It reveals to him that it is the last of its race and it believes that Tom can help it wipe out the Espheni and avenge the genocide of the Dornia. The Dornia gives Tom a biological weapon that when used on the Espheni Queen, will wipe out the Espheni. While the weapon is proven to be lethal to humans too, Marty manages to modify it so that it isn't. Anne Mason worries that the Dornia is just using the humans and that is why they made the weapon lethal to humans as well, but Cochise suggests they simply didn't realize they did that. In the series finale, Reborn, Tom manages to use the Dornia bioweapon on the Espheni Queen, killing her and spreading the bioweapon to the entire Espheni race through her organic connection to them. The Espheni are wiped out and Tom returns to the beach with a dead Anne to plead with the Dornia to save her since he gave them their vengeance when he wiped out the Espheni. After a moment, tentacles emerge from beneath the water and pull Anne under. The Dornia resurrect Anne and return her and her unborn child safely to Tom. It is unknown what happens to them after this.

=== Espheni-generated humans ===
Following the loss of their power core and mechanized servants, the Espheni adopted a new tactic of killing important humans and replacing them with Espheni clones who possess all of their knowledge and personality, but are programmed to perform a specific task. It is unknown how many of these humans exist, but the 2nd Mass encounter two: Katie Marshall and Alexis Glass-Mason. It is stated that these humans are so well-made that even with his spikes, Ben Mason can't tell them apart from regular humans. They bleed black blood however. Six weeks before the 2nd Mass encountered the 14th Virginia, the Espheni killed militia leader Captain Katie Marshall and replaced her with a clone who took commands from an Overlord who kept an eye on her base. Under the command of this copy of Marshall, the 14th Virginia began hunting what they believed were human collaborators but were actually resistance soldiers dangerous to the Espheni. When Marshall tries to execute the Mason family, her true nature is exposed and she is killed. Shortly afterwards, the Espheni create a clone of Alexis Glass-Mason in hopes of assassinating Tom Mason before he reaches Washington and the Espheni Queen. Due to the encounter with the Marshall clone, the 2nd Mass is left suspicious of the Alexis clone's story. However, they manage to learn from her the importance of the Espheni Queen being on Earth and that the Espheni have been here before. When the Alexis clone attacks Tom, his son Ben hits her with a Dornia bioweapon, killing her. Any other clones in existence were wiped out when the bioweapon was spread through the Espheni and their various races by Tom.

=== Espheni Queen ===
The supreme ruler of the Espheni. She is also the power behind the invasion. The Queen is worshipped by the Espheni like a god and has an organic connection to her entire race. The Queen sent an invasion 1,500 years ago led by her beloved daughter, but underestimated humanity and the Espheni were defeated and her daughter killed. Enraged, the Espheni Queen vowed to return a thousand times stronger to wipe out humanity in revenge for her daughter's death. Cochise's reaction to the discovery of the Queen's existence suggests that the Volm are aware of the possibility of her existence, but have never encountered her in person before and didn't know for sure that she was real. According to an Espheni-generated clone of Alexis Glass-Mason, the Queen only comes to a planet when victory is certain and that her presence means that the Espheni are switching objectives from invasion to occupation. Months after the destruction of the Espheni power core and the loss of the Espheni mechanized servants, the 2nd Mass learn of her existence from Ben Mason using an Espheni communications device and witnessing a ritual to her. Ben begins using the device to try to locate the Queen who creates a clone of Alexis Glass-Mason to try to assassinate Tom Mason, the human resistance leader. The clone fails and Ben locates a clue that states that the Queen is "at the foot of the giant." Having figured out they need to go to Washington already, Tom determines that the clue means that the Queen is at the Lincoln Memorial. While all the militias in the United States assault a powerful defensive wall around the city, Tom leads a strike team through the city's service tunnels to reach the Memorial and kill the Queen. Tom gets separated from the rest of the team but reaches the Lincoln Memorial where Tom and the Queen finally confront each other face to face. The Queen pins Tom to a wall with webbing and telepathically shows him the true reason for the Espheni invasion and believes that when she kills him, human resistance will fall. Tom insists that humanity will never gave up and she didn't learn from her first mistake. The Queen begins to drain Tom's blood, but he manages to reach a bioweapon supplied to him by the Dornia and infects himself with it. While Tom is immune to the weapon thanks to Marty's modifications to it, the Queen absorbs the virus through the blood she sucks from Tom's body and is infected. The Queen quickly removes her sucker, but it is too late and she is killed by the bioweapon. The bioweapon spreads through the Espheni Queen's connection to her entire race and the Espheni are wiped out and Earth is freed.
