= Falling Skies =

2011 American science fiction television series

- Series title card
- Genre: Science fiction; Post-apocalyptic; Drama
- Created by: Robert Rodat
- Starring: Noah Wyle; Moon Bloodgood; Drew Roy; Jessy Schram; Maxim Knight; Seychelle Gabriel; Peter Shinkoda; Mpho Koaho; Connor Jessup; Will Patton; Sarah Carter; Colin Cunningham; Doug Jones; Scarlett Byrne
- Composer: Noah Sorota
- Country of origin: United States
- Original language: English
- No. of seasons: 5
- No. of episodes: 52 (list of episodes)

Production
- Executive producers: Steven Spielberg; Darryl Frank; Justin Falvey; Robert Rodat; Graham Yost; Greg Beeman; Remi Aubuchon; David Eick
- Producers: John Ryan; Noah Wyle; Darren King; Grace Gilroy
- Production locations: Hamilton, Oshawa and Toronto, Ontario, Canada; Vancouver, British Columbia, Canada
- Cinematography: Christopher Faloona; Nate Goodman; Barry Donlevy
- Editors: Donn Aron; Jon Koslowsky; Robin Russell
- Camera setup: Single camera
- Running time: 40–43 minutes
- Production companies: DreamWorks Television (2011–2013); Amblin Television (2014–2015); Invasion Productions; TNT Original Productions

Original release
- Network: TNT
- Release: June 19, 2011 – August 30, 2015

Falling Skies is an American post-apocalyptic science fiction television series, created by Robert Rodat and executive produced by Steven Spielberg. The series stars Noah Wyle as Tom Mason, a former history professor who becomes the third-in-command (under Captain Weaver and retired United States Army Colonel Porter) of the Massachusetts Militia Regiment, a paramilitary group of remnant US military personnel, military veterans, civilians and various fighters fleeing Boston, US, following an alien invasion that devastated Earth. The series also stars Moon Bloodgood, Drew Roy, Jessy Schram, Maxim Knight, Seychelle Gabriel, Peter Shinkoda, Mpho Koaho, Connor Jessup, Will Patton, Sarah Carter, Colin Cunningham, Doug Jones and Scarlett Byrne.

The series, a production of DreamWorks Television—and from 2014 to 2015, being a production from Spielberg's Amblin Television—was broadcast in the United States on the cable channel TNT, and in Canada on Super Channel (first-run broadcasts) and on Space (second-run broadcasts on a one-year delay). The series premiered on June 19, 2011. On July 18, 2014, TNT renewed the show for a 10-episode fifth and final season, which started on June 28, 2015, and concluded on August 30, 2015.

On January 1, 2026, Falling Skies was added to Netflix for streaming.

Over its run, the series was nominated for two Primetime Emmy Awards for Outstanding Special Visual Effects, and 14 Saturn Awards including three nominations for Best Television Presentation and one for Best Syndicated/Cable Television Series.

== Series overview ==
Falling Skies begins six months after an alien invasion of Earth, where in the early days, the invaders neutralized the world's power grid and technology, defeated and largely destroyed all the world's militaries, and killed over 90 percent of the human population by destroying all of the world's major cities and capitals. The remaining 700 million humans, spread across the planet, continue to be killed by the alien invaders on an ongoing basis.

The aliens include mechanical attack drones called "mechs"; a species of six-legged beings known as "Skitters" that appear to control the mechs; and a mysterious species known as the Overlords, or "Espheni", the latter presumably the actual engineers and masterminds behind the invasion and Skitters' masters.

The aliens' objectives are not explained until the fourth season. They plan to extract helium-3 from Earth's moon to power their technology and to use humanity as an enslaved frontline military force in their war against another alien race. To do this, the invaders round up children between the ages of 8 and 18 to each of whom a biomechanical mind control harness will be attached to their spine. Forcibly removing it generally kills the child, but midway through the first season, a surgical method is developed that allows a harness to be safely removed, leaving in place the "spikes" that connected the harness to the spinal column. The fifth season reveals through an Espheni communication device (which Ben, who has the spikes, can interact with by touching) that the Overlords have a Queen. In the series finale, the Queen explains that the invasion upon which the entire series is based is the result of a prior Espheni attempt to invade Earth, which is the only habitable planet in this galaxy and thus of immeasurable strategic importance. Her beloved daughter led that invasion 1550 years ago, but the Espheni underestimated humanity and the invasion was stopped. The Queen's daughter was killed and eaten, so she swore to wipe out humanity in revenge.

The story follows a group of survivors who band together to fight back. They call themselves the "2nd Mass", an allusion to the historical regiment from the Continental Army. The group is led by retired United States Army Colonel Dan Weaver. Boston University history professor Tom Mason is second-in-command and must put his extensive knowledge of military history into practice while searching for his son Ben.

At the end of the second season, a new alien race known as the Volm are introduced. Led by a Volm nicknamed Cochise by Tom Mason, the Volm are another species conquered by the Espheni in their galactic expansion, and who want to destroy the Espheni in revenge. While more Volm forces arrive at the end of the third season, an attack on the Volm across the galaxy causes all but Cochise and a small team of Volm to abandon Earth. Cochise and his soldiers continue to aid humanity in their war with the Espheni despite the lack of support from their superiors, notably Cochise's father.

In the fourth season, a devastating Espheni counterattack relegates humanity to Espheni-controlled ghettos across the planet. Meanwhile, Tom's half-Espheni daughter Alexis continues to grow and develop psychic powers due to her heritage. After the 2nd Mass eventually escapes the ghettos, another attack severely depletes its numbers. Learning of a power core on the Moon that controls all Espheni technology, Tom and Alexis launch an attack on the it using a captured Espheni spacecraft. Alexis sacrifices herself to destroy the power core and Tom is lost in space, but the Espheni war machine is left crippled by the loss of their air support and mechanized servants.

In the fifth season, Tom is rescued by the Espheni's ancient enemy, the Dornia, who guide him into finding his inner warrior to defeat the Espheni once and for all. Returned to Earth, Tom rallies humanity into a global resistance that will march on major Espheni bases all over the world. Tom leads the militias in the United States in a march on the Espheni base in Washington, D.C. With the help of an Espheni communications device, humanity learns that the Espheni serve a previously unknown queen who comes to planets when victory is assured and the Espheni are moving from invasion to occupation. Tracking the queen to the ruins of the Lincoln Memorial, Tom confronts her alone and she informs him of the true reason for the invasion. Tom manages to infect the Espheni Queen with a Dornia bioweapon, killing her and spreading the bioweapon throughout the Espheni species. The Espheni are destroyed and Earth is freed. Months later, humanity is united and no longer faced by the pre-invasion challenges of over-population, moving forward with the benefits of the technology taken from the Espheni, Volm and Dornia. Humanity begins rebuilding Earth and making plans to elect a new leader; when Tom is offered the leadership position, he refuses it.

== Cast ==
=== Main ===
Actor	Character	Seasons				
Actor	Character	1	2	3	4	5
Noah Wyle	Tom Mason	Main	Main	Main	Main	Main
Moon Bloodgood	Anne Glass-Mason	Main	Main	Main	Main	Main
Drew Roy	Hal Mason	Main	Main	Main	Main	Main
Jessy Schram	Karen Nadler	Main	Recurring	Recurring	Guest	
Maxim Knight	Matt Mason	Main	Main	Main	Main	Main
Seychelle Gabriel	Lourdes Delgado	Main	Main	Main	Main	
Peter Shinkoda	Dai	Main	Main	Guest		
Mpho Koaho	Anthony	Main	Main	Main	Main	Main
Connor Jessup	Ben Mason	Main	Main	Main	Main	Main
Will Patton	Dan Weaver	Main	Main	Main	Main	Main
Sarah Carter	Maggie	Main	Main	Main	Main	Main
Colin Cunningham	John Pope	Main	Main	Main	Main	Main
Doug Jones	Cochise			Main	Main	Main
Scarlett Byrne	Alexis "Lexi" Glass-Mason				Main	Guest

=== Recurring ===
- Dale Dye as Colonel/General Jim Porter (seasons 1–3)
- Megan Danso as Deni (seasons 3–5)
- Bruce Gray as Uncle Scott (season 1)
- Martin Roach as Mike Thompson (season 1)
- Lynne Deragon as Kate Gordon (season 1)
- Melissa Kramer as Sarah (season 1)
- Steven Weber as Dr. Michael Harris (season 1)
- Dylan Authors as Jimmy Boland (seasons 1–2)
- Daniyah Ysrail as Rick Thompson (seasons 1–2)
- Ryan Robbins as Tector Murphy, one of the Berserkers (season 2–4)
- Luciana Carro as Crazy Lee, one of the Berserkers (seasons 2–3)
- Brad Kelly as Lyle, one of the Berserkers (seasons 2–4)
- Billy Wickman as Boon, one of the Berserkers (season 2)
- Terry O'Quinn as Arthur Manchester (seasons 2–3)
- Matt Frewer as General Bressler (seasons 2–3)
- Laci J. Mailey as Jeanne Weaver (seasons 2–4)
- Brandon Jay McLaren as Jamil Dexter (season 2)
- Gloria Reuben as Marina Peralta (season 3)
- Robert Sean Leonard as Dr. Roger Kadar (seasons 3–4)
- John H. Mayer as Waschak-Cha'ab (seasons 3–5)
- Dakota Daulby as Kent Matthews (season 4)
- Desiree Ross as Mira (season 4)
- Robert Clotworthy as the Monk (season 4)
- Mark Gibbon as Scorch (season 4)
- Mira Sorvino as Sara (seasons 4–5)
- Treva Etienne as Dingaan Botha (season 4–5)
- John DeSantis as Shaq (season 4–5)
- Catalina Sandino Moreno as Isabella (season 5)

== Production ==
=== Conception ===
Development officially began in 2009, when TNT announced that it had ordered a pilot for an untitled alien invasion project. Falling Skies was created by Robert Rodat. Rodat wrote the pilot episode from an idea co-conceived with Spielberg. Originally, Falling Skies was called Concord, referencing the battles of Lexington and Concord and Tom Mason's former profession as a history professor. Spielberg then came up with the title Falling Skies. "I felt that this was a very interesting postapocalyptic story with a 21st-century [spin on the] spirit of '76. I came up – out of the blue one day – with the name Falling Skies, which is basically what happens to the planet after this invasion. What is unique about this particular series is that the story starts after a successful conquest of the world," he stated.

Spielberg was attracted to the project due to its themes of survival. "I've always been interested in how we survive and how resourceful we are as Americans. How would the survivors feed the children? How do they resupply themselves militarily in order to defend and even take back what they have lost?" he added. Like much of Spielberg's work, such as The Pacific and E.T. the Extra-Terrestrial, Falling Skies' running theme is family and brotherhood. He explained, "It's a theme I harken back to a lot because it's something I believe in. It's something I have the closest experience with. [Laughs] They say write what you know, and with seven children and three sisters... I tend to always come back to the family as a touchstone for audiences to get into these rather bizarre stories."

While writing the pilot, Rodat dedicated a five-page montage to the alien invasion, but decided not to go through with it as it had been done before in films such as War of the Worlds. "I wrote a few drafts of it and I looked at and say, 'Ay-yay-yay, I've seen this before. There's no emotion to this. It feels like one of those montages,'" he said. Rodat came up with the idea of having the children in the series "harnessed by aliens". "When we were working out the initial stuff, the thing that excited [Spielberg] was the idea that adults are killed if they're a threat, and kids are captured for whatever reason and changed or altered. The harness was a logical outgrowth of that. Then what we'll explore is what the harnessing does to the kid over the course of the show but that also is something that's going to have to unveil itself gradually," he stated. Spielberg previously explored the idea of enslaved children in the 1984 film Indiana Jones and the Temple of Doom.

Series lead Noah Wyle emphasized Spielberg's presence on set by stating, "Anytime he gives an anointment to a project, it steps up the pedigree." He continued, "[His] fingerprints are all over this. He shaped the script, cast the pilot, watched all the dailies, made the editing suggestions, worked on the post and on the aliens and spaceships."

Colin Cunningham, who plays outlaw John Pope, said, "You'd show up and think, 'This is not a TV show; this is something else that we're doing," noting that Spielberg was very hands-on for the pilot. "Its scope is massive. Anytime you hear the word Spielberg, you know it's not going to be crap; you know it'll be quality and there will be some money behind it." Mark Verheiden, who was the showrunner for the first season, stated, "It's great to know you have a world-class filmmaker backing up what you're trying to do who is supportive and helping design the great stuff."

=== Casting ===
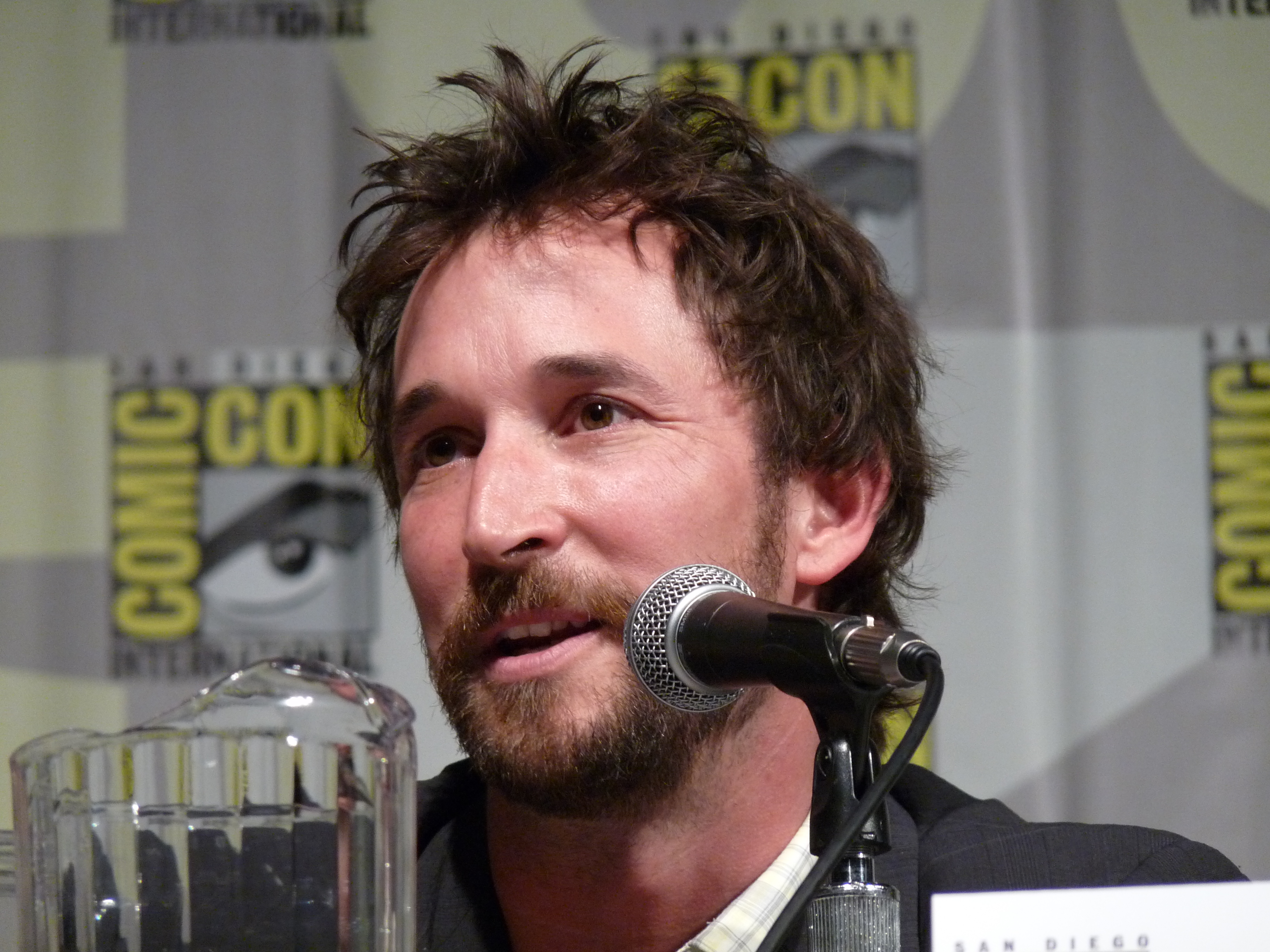
Wyle at the 2010 San Diego Comic-Con promoting the series

Casting announcements began in June 2009 with Noah Wyle as the lead. Wyle, who worked with TNT on The Librarian films, was sent scripts for various shows on their network. He said part of the reason he chose the part was to gain credibility from his children. "With the birth of my kids, I started to really look at my career through their eyes more than my own, so that does dictate choice, steering me toward certain things and away from other things," he said.

He also decided to do it as he could relate with his character, stating, "I identified with Tom's devotion to his sons, and admired his sense of social duty." Spielberg wanted Wyle for the role because he knew him from his previous series ER, which Spielberg's company produced. He had wanted Wyle to appear in his 1998 film Saving Private Ryan, but Wyle was unavailable due to scheduling conflicts. Spielberg stated that he was determined to work with him again.

One of the things that was most attractive about it was shooting 10 episodes as opposed to 24, which affords me a bit of quality-of-life and allows me to have a presence in my kids' lives. But in terms of quality of writing, this was great writing. Mark Verheiden's a great writer. I enjoy this kind of storytelling just as much as all of those years on ER.

— Noah Wyle, on why he chose the role

In July 2009, Moon Bloodgood was cast as Anne Glass, Jessy Schram was cast as Karen Nadler, Seychelle Gabriel was cast as Lourdes, and Maxim Knight was cast as Matt Mason. Bloodgood, the female lead, did not have to audition for the role. She received the script and was offered the role. Bloodgood was drawn to the role because of Spielberg and Rodat's involvement. She stated: "Well certainly when you get handed a script and they tell you it's Bob Rodat and Steven Spielberg, you're immediately drawn to it. It's got your attention. I was a little cautious about wanting to do science fiction again. But it was more of a drama story, more of a family story. I liked that and I wanted to work with Spielberg." Bloodgood added that portraying a doctor excited her. "I liked the idea of playing a doctor and deviating from something I had done already," she said.

In August 2009, Drew Roy was cast as Hal Mason, and Peter Shinkoda was cast as Dai. Drew Roy's agent received the script and the pair joked that Roy might get the role. "This one came to me through my agent, just like everything else. We even joked about the fact that it was a Steven Spielberg project. We were like, 'Oh yeah, I might have a chance.' We were just joking." He auditioned four times for the part. "The whole process went on for quite some time, and then towards the end, it was down to me and one other guy, and we were literally waiting for the word from Steven Spielberg 'cause he had to watch the two audition tapes and give the okay. That, in and of itself, had me like, 'Okay, even if I don't get it, that's just cool.' Fortunately, it went my way."

=== Filming ===
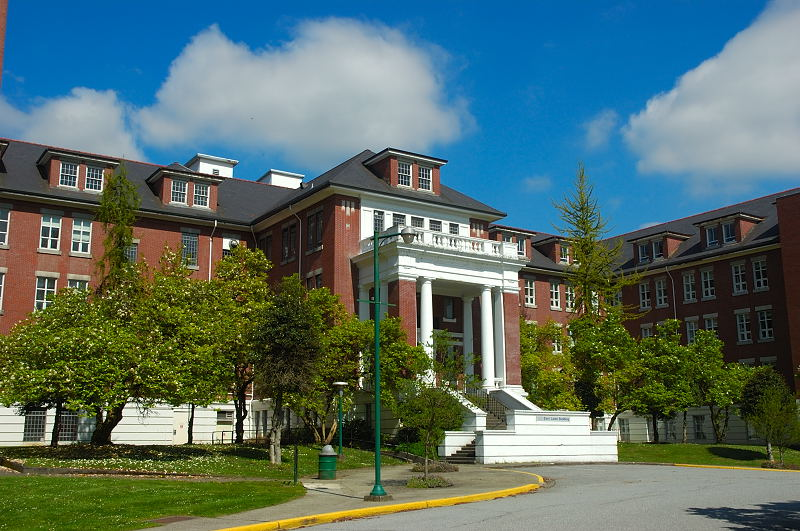
The Riverview Hospital mental health facility in Coquitlam, Canada was used to film several episodes of the second season.

The pilot was filmed in 2009 in Oshawa, Ontario, and the rest of the season was shot from July to November of the following year in Hamilton and Toronto.

TNT announced production had begun on the second season on October 24, 2011. Filming took place in Vancouver and at the Riverview Hospital in Coquitlam, British Columbia, from October 2011 to March 2012.

Principal photography for the third season commenced in Vancouver on August 22, 2012, and concluded in December.

=== Production team ===
Rodat and Spielberg serve as executive producers on the project. Graham Yost, Justin Falvey, and Darryl Frank are also executive producers. Yost had previously worked with Spielberg on the HBO miniseries The Pacific. Mark Verheiden is a co-executive producer and the series showrunner. Verheiden had worked as a writer and producer on Battlestar Galactica. Greg Beeman is also a co-executive producer. Melinda Hsu Taylor is a supervising producer for the series; she previously worked on Lost. John Ryan is the on-set producer. Remi Aubuchon was hired as the showrunner for the second season in May 2011 before the first-season premiere. Noah Wyle became a producer for the second season.

== Distribution ==
=== Broadcast ===
The series premiered on June 19, 2011, and was broadcast on the cable television channel TNT in the United States. It also premiered internationally in more than 75 countries that same year.

=== Online promotion ===
Promotional poster

For the first season, character videos were made available online. The videos explore the main characters of the series. As part of the promotional campaign, a vehicle, with the TNT logo and called Falling Skies Technical, was released as a free gift in the social networking game Mafia Wars on June 14, 2011. Following the second-season premiere on June 17, 2012, a live after-show titled 2nd Watch hosted by Wil Wheaton premiered. The series aired after encore presentations of Falling Skies on TNT's official site. Wheaton discussed the latest episode with actors and producers of the series.

=== Blu-ray and DVD releases ===
The first season was released on DVD and Blu-ray on June 5, 2012, in North America, on July 2, 2012, in the United Kingdom and on August 29, 2012, in Australia, and on DVD only in South Africa on August 27, 2012. In addition to all the episodes of the first season, extras include an extended version of the pilot episode, audio commentary on the pilot episode, a season-two preview, the 2011 San Diego Comic-Con panel, deleted scenes, character profiles, international promos, behind-the-scenes featurettes including the "Making of Skitter", "Harness Makeup Tips", and "Director One on One". A collectible trading card was released exclusively to Blu-ray.

=== Comic books ===
In September 2010, Dark Horse Comics, in partnership with DreamWorks Television and TNT, released the first issue in a four-part digital comic online limited series entitled Falling Skies. Written by Paul Tobin with art by Juan Ferreyra, the series details events taking place before the first season of the television show, but after the alien invasion and victory. These issues were later compiled into a single trade paperback volume entitled Falling Skies Volume 1, which was released in June 2011. On June 15, 2011, Dark Horse announced that due to higher-than-anticipated orders, the graphic novel had completely sold out. It remained in publication as of June 2012.

In April 2012, Dark Horse began releasing a second eight-issue limited series entitled Falling Skies: The Battle of Fitchburg, with Paul Tobin returning as writer and Juan Ferreyra returning as series artist. The digital comic was made available through both Dark Horse Comics and TNT via their respective websites. The story takes place chronologically between the first and second seasons of the television show and details a costly engagement occurring between the skitters and the 2nd Massachusetts Militia Regiment when the aliens surround the human forces at Fitchburg, Massachusetts. While not vital to the story of the television series, TNT and Dark Horse have stated that Falling Skies: The Battle of Fitchburg provides insight into the events leading up to the second season, and elaborates on how the characters got to where they are when the new season opens. As a companion to the comic, TNT released an audio series featuring the character John Pope, offering additional insight into the events detailed in the comic series.

=== Video game ===
Falling Skies: The Game was developed by Torus Games and published by Little Orbit as a turn-based tactical video game inspired by XCOM: Enemy Unknown and it was released for the PlayStation 3, Xbox 360, and PC, on September 30, 2014, and then the Wii U via the Nintendo eShop on October 30, 2014.

The game received mostly poor to negative reviews across all platforms due to slow gameplay, poor balancing in its mechanics, uninspired characters, and a weak story.

== Reception ==
=== Critical reception ===
Critical response of Falling Skies
Series	Rotten Tomatoes	Metacritic
1	79% (38 reviews)	70 (27 reviews)
2	81% (21 reviews)	64 (9 reviews)
3	77% (13 reviews)	65 (4 reviews)
4	88% (8 reviews)	—
5	70% (10 reviews)	—

For the first season, the series had a mostly positive reception. Tim Goodman of The Hollywood Reporter wrote "... the entertainment value and suspense of Falling Skies is paced just right. You get the sense that we'll get those answers eventually. And yet, you want to devour the next episode immediately." Thomas Conner of the Chicago Sun-Times called it "... a trustworthy family drama but with aliens". He continued, "It's Jericho meets V, with the good from both and the bad discarded. It'll raise the summer-TV bar significantly." Ken Tucker from Entertainment Weekly gave the series a B+ and wrote that a "gradually developed, but decisive conviction makes Falling Skies an engaging, if derivative, chunk of dystopian sci-fi". He continued, "... Falling Skies rises above any one performance; it's the spectacle of humans versus aliens that draws you in." In the Boston Herald, Mark A. Perigard gave the series a B grade, writing, "Don't look now, but Falling Skies could be a summer obsession." Brian Lowry from Variety gave the series a mixed review, stating that he enjoyed the action sequences, but that "the soapier elements mostly fall flat" and called the series "painfully old-fashioned".

The second season had positive reviews. Some critics praised it as being stronger than the first season. Maureen Ryan of The Huffington Post compared the second season to the first by saying, "Season 2 is a different animal, a much leaner and meaner machine that allows sentiment to be present but unexpressed and depicts a darker world in which innocence is a luxury that no one can truly afford." Chuck Barney declared, "Sunday's explosive two-hour opener boldly delivers on the promise by TNT producers to rev up both the pace and the firepower in Season 2." Screen Rant's Anthony Ocasio lauded the season premiere. "While further episodes will reveal more, the type of character development, intriguing storylines and exciting action that will be contained in Falling Skies season 2, there's no doubt that TNT's hit drama will likely become an epic adventure, spanning many seasons," he said.

=== Ratings ===
The two-hour premiere of Falling Skies was watched by 5.9 million viewers, making it cable television's biggest series launch of the year, with more than 2.6 million adults 18–49 and 3.2 million adults 25–54. The eighth episode was watched by 4.31 million viewers and scored a 1.5 ratings share among adults 18–49 and Falling Skies became TNT's highest-rated series in target demos. The first-season finale had 5.6 million viewers, the highest-rated episode since the series premiere, with 2.5 million viewers in the 18–49 demographic. The first season tied with the FX series American Horror Story as the biggest new cable series of the year among adults 18–49. In the UK, it premiered on nonterrestrial channel FX, with 420,000 viewers.

=== Awards and nominations ===
Year	Association	Category	Nominated	Result
2011	1st Critics' Choice Television Awards	Most Exciting New Series	Falling Skies	Won
2012	10th Visual Effects Society Awards	Outstanding Visual Effects in a Broadcast Series	Rob Biagi, Curt Miller, Andrew Orloff, Sean Tompkins	Nominated
2012	10th Visual Effects Society Awards	Outstanding Models in a Broadcast Program or Commercial	Jon Chesson, Steve Graves, Michael Kirylo, Renaud Talon	Nominated
2012	38th Saturn Awards	Best Presentation on Television (10 Episodes or Less)	Falling Skies	Nominated
2012	38th Saturn Awards	Best Actor on Television	Noah Wyle	Nominated
2012	64th Primetime Emmy Awards	Outstanding Special Visual Effects	Falling Skies	Nominated
2012	33rd Young Artist Awards	Best Performance in a TV Series – Supporting Young Actor	Maxim Knight	Won
2013	34th Young Artist Awards	Best Performance in a TV Series – Supporting Young Actor	Maxim Knight	Nominated
2013	34th Young Artist Awards	Best Performance in a TV Series – Guest Starring Young Actress 14–16	Laine MacNeil	Nominated
2013	34th Young Artist Awards	Best Performance in a TV Series – Guest Starring Young Actress 11–13	Olivia Steele Falconer	Nominated
2014	35th Young Artist Awards	Best Performance in a TV Series – Supporting Young Actor	Maxim Knight	Nominated
2015	41st Saturn Awards	Best Syndicated/Cable Television Series	Falling Skies	Nominated
