= Seychelle Gabriel =

American actress

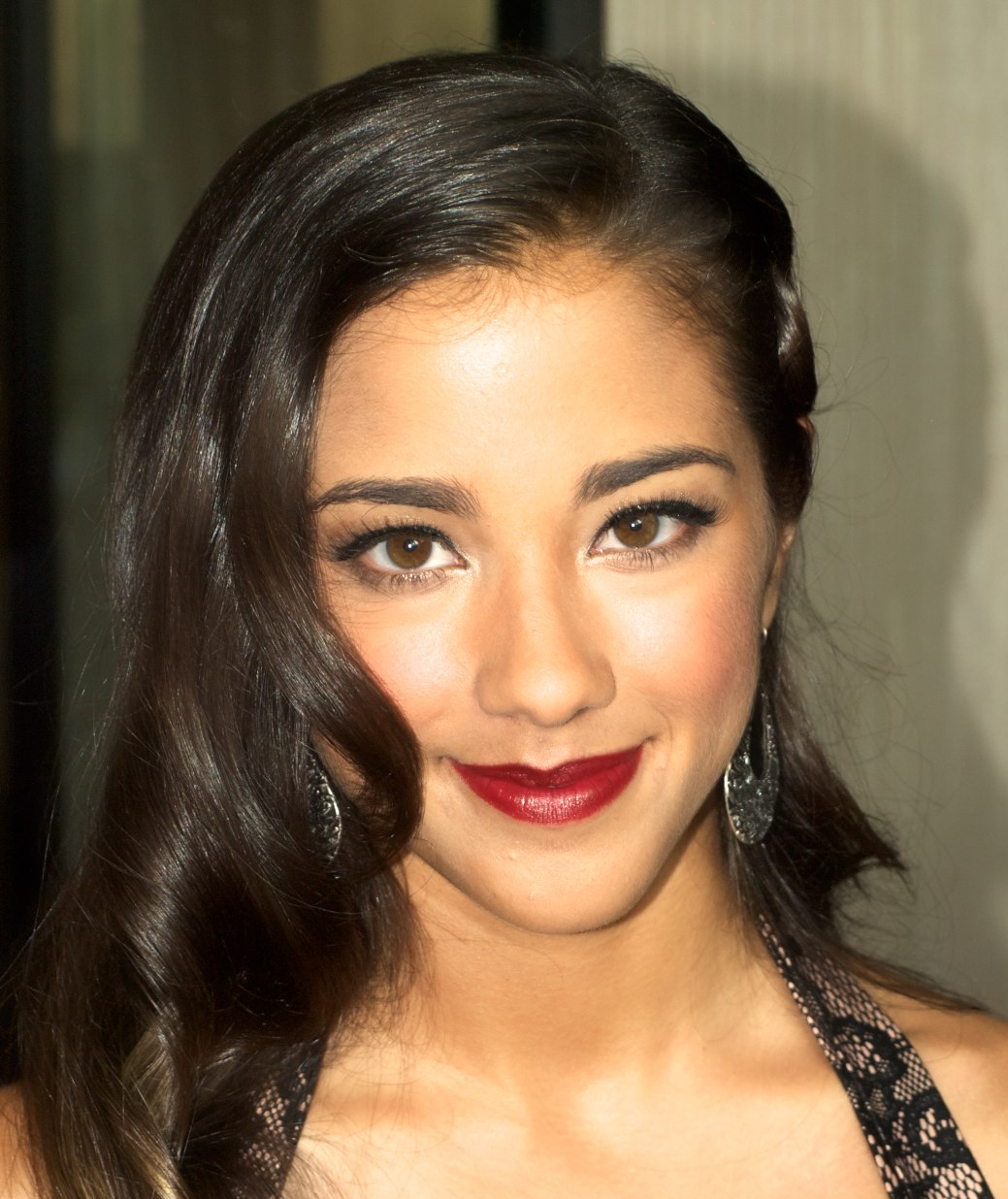
- Gabriel at the Imagen Awards in 2012
- Born: Burbank, California, U.S.
- Education: University of California, Los Angeles (BA)
- Occupation: Actress
- Years active: 2007–present
- Known for: The Last Airbender – Princess Yue; Falling Skies – Lourdes Delgado; The Legend of Korra – Asami Sato

Seychelle Gabriel is an American actress.

== Early life and education ==
Seychelle Gabriel was born and raised in Burbank, California. Her parents are Michelle and Guy Gabriel a yoga instructor and her mother is a casting agent. She got into acting through her mother's involvement in casting extras for commercials and videos. Her father has Mexican and French roots, while her mother is Italian. She has a younger brother. She graduated from Burbank High School in 2006. In 2023, she graduated from UCLA with a degree in Ethnomusicology.

== Career ==
Gabriel appeared as Princess Yue in The Last Airbender (2010), directed by M. Night Shyamalan. The film was based on the first season of Avatar: The Last Airbender. Gabriel appeared in Honey 2 (2011), directed by Bille Woodruff, produced by Universal Studios Home Entertainment. Gabriel also appeared in the films The Spirit (2008), as Young Sand Saref. She has performed on The Tonight Show, a late-night talk show, and had a recurring role on the comedy-drama television series Weeds. She has also appeared in one episode of Zoey 101.

It was announced on March 7, 2011, that Gabriel was to voice the character Asami Sato in the Nickelodeon series The Legend of Korra. Gabriel appeared as Lourdes, a series regular on the original TNT sci-fi action/drama series Falling Skies produced by Steven Spielberg 2011–2014. She also appeared in a 2014 music video by My Dear titled "Standing in This Dream".

== Filmography ==
Film
Year	Title	Role	Notes
2008	The Spirit	Young Sand Saref	
2010	The Last Airbender	Princess Yue	Nominated - Young Artist Award for Best Performance in a Feature Film (Supporting Young Actress); Nominated - Golden Raspberry Award for Worst Screen Couple (with the entire cast)
2011	Honey 2	Tina	
2014	Jabbawockeez: Regenerate	Allison	Short film
2016	Sleight	Holly	
2017	The Outdoorsman	Jillian	
2018	Blood Fest	Sam	
2021	The Tomorrow War	Sergeant Diaz	

Television
Year	Title	Role	Notes
2007	Zoey 101	Very attractive girl	Episode: "Zoey's Ribs"
2009	Weeds	Adelita Reyes	3 episodes
2010	Miami Medical	Lucy	Episode: "An Arm and a Leg"
2011–2014	Falling Skies	Lourdes Delgado	Main role (seasons 1–4); 38 episodes
2012–2014	The Legend of Korra	Asami Sato (voice)	Main role (seasons 1–4); 37 episodes
2013	Revenge	Regina George	4 episodes
2015	Beautiful & Twisted	May	Television film
2017	Sleepy Hollow	Lara	3 episodes
2018	Fortune Rookie	Seychelle (voice)	Episode: "Nemesis"
2019	Blackout	Izzy Itani	8 episodes
2019	Get Shorty	Giulia	3 episodes
2021	Grey's Anatomy	Veronica Diaz	Episode: "Breathe"
2023	Daisy Jones & the Six	Julia Dunne	9 episodes
2026	Get Jiro	Maria Guerrero (voice)	Main role

Video Games
Year	Title	Role
2024	Suicide Squad: Kill the Justice League	Lois Lane

Web
Year	Title	Role	Notes
2012	The Living	Dr. Anne Stephens (voice)	Miniseries
