= Peter Shinkoda =

Canadian actor

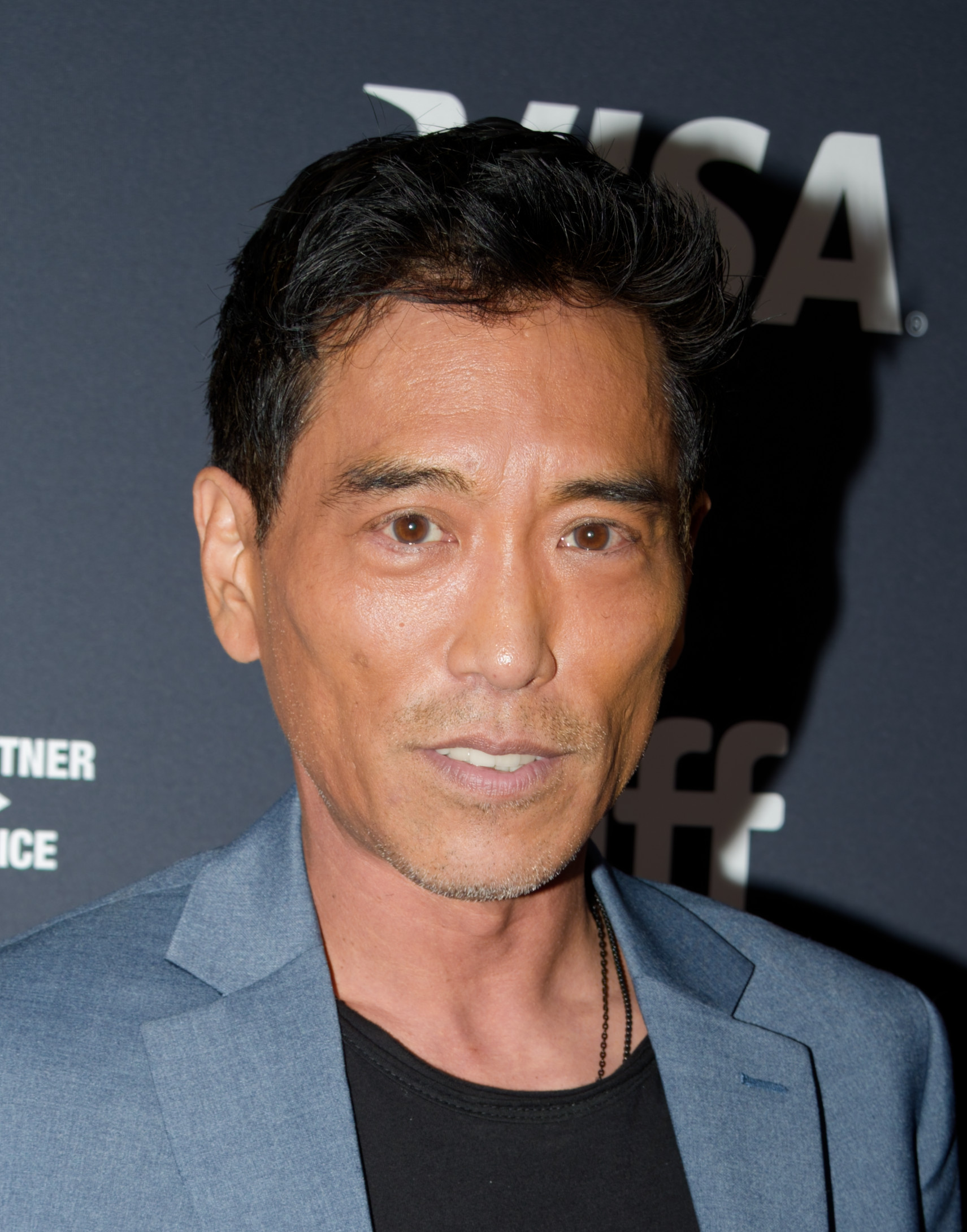
- Shinkoda at the 2025 Toronto International Film Festival for Normal
- Born: March 25, 1971 (age 55); Montreal, Quebec, Canada
- Occupation: Actor
- Years active: 1991–present

Peter Shinkoda (born March 25, 1971) is a Canadian film and television actor who stars as Dai on the TNT science fiction series Falling Skies from Steven Spielberg and as Sektor in the Warner Bros. webseries Mortal Kombat: Legacy directed by Kevin Tancharoen. Shinkoda also starred as recurring villain Nobu Yoshioka on Seasons 1 and 2 of Marvel's Daredevil.

Shinkoda has also starred as in films such as Midway (as Minoru Genda), The Predator (as Dr. Yamada), War (as Harbor Yanagawa Shatei); I, Robot (as Detective Chin); Paycheck and TV shows such as Hawaii Five-0 (as Alan Kim), Sanctuary (as Andy Fetz), Dark Angel (as Albino X), Stargate SG-1, Supernatural, The L Word (as Bryan Karikawa), Kingdom Hospital, Andromeda (as Burke), Cold Squad, Masked Rider and the original Mighty Morphin Power Rangers (in both series as Ferrian).

== Early life ==
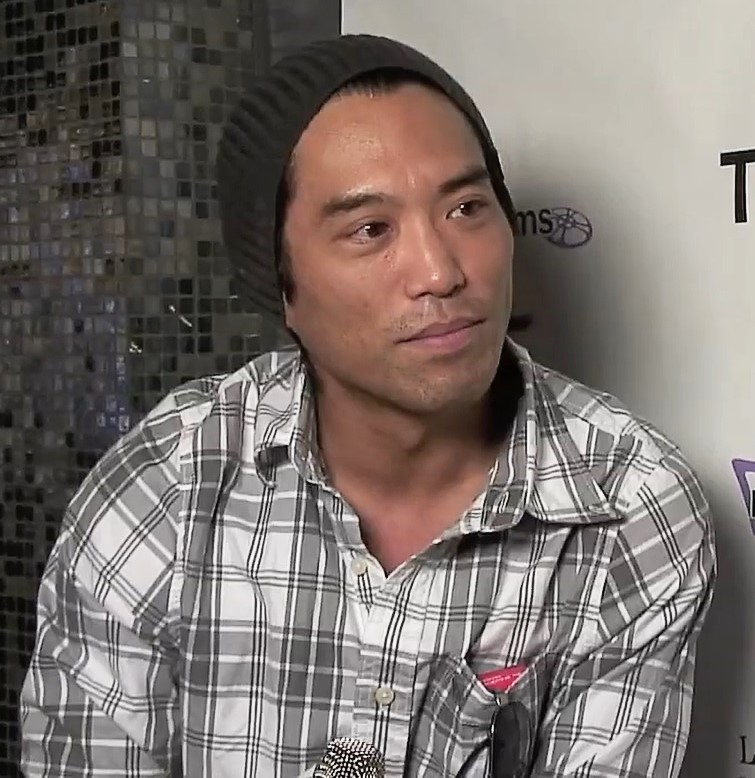
Shinkoda in 2010

Peter Shinkoda was born March 25, 1971 in Montreal, Quebec, where he and his brother Michael were raised. Though family and friends encouraged him to be practical and pursue a career in engineering or medicine, he was focused on an entertainment career from a young age. His first attempt at acting came when he forced his parents to drive six hours to Toronto to attend an international casting call for the role of Short Round in Steven Spielberg’s film Indiana Jones and the Temple of Doom. He did not get the part, and went on to focus on sports, excelling at hockey, skiing, football, baseball, soccer and judo. He also studied classical piano and was identified as one of the top young pianists in Canada by the time he was 13 years old.

At 18, Shinkoda moved to Toronto to stay with relatives, but only stayed a year, leaving to attend the University of Western Ontario to pursue a Civil Engineering degree. He began spending summers in Los Angeles and eventually made the transition to study Post Production for Film and Television at UCLA.

== Career ==
After UCLA, Shinkoda went on to work as an assistant editor on such films as Romeo Must Die, Rat Race, Freddie Got Fingered and Saving Silverman, although he never finished any of the editing projects as acting assignments always arose to supersede them. Shinkoda once studied acting at the East-West Players Conservatory, and earned a lead role in the Northwest Asian American Theater’s production of Exit the Dragon by Eric Michael Zee, produced by Ming-Na Wen.

== Filmography ==
=== Film ===
Year	Title	Role	Notes
1991	If Looks Could Kill	French Club	
2001	Crash and Byrnes	Victor	Video
2003	Paycheck	Suit	
2004	Miracle	Japanese Athlete	
2004	The Truth About Miranda	Model	
2004	I, Robot	Chin	
2004	Lucky Stars	Peter	
2006	Spymate	Mountain Guard #2	
2006	Man About Town	Agency Assistant	
2007	War	Harbor Yanagawa Shatei	
2007	Battle in Seattle	Protester	Uncredited
2009	The Hole	Young Cop	
2014	Godzilla	Muto Crow's Nest Tech #1	
2014	Jackhammer	Nee Long	
2014	Zero Day	Tseung	Short
2014	Dragons Vs. Robots	Reiling	Short
2014	The Lady Killers	Brian	
2015	Western Religion	Chinaman Dan	
2015	Inflection	Chad	
2018	The Predator	Dr. Yamada	
2019	Midway	Minoru Genda	
2025	Normal		
2025	Prisoner of War	Lt. Col. Ito	Direct-to-video
2026	Tight Lettuce (Tissé serré)	Fire Chief	

=== Television ===
Year	Title	Role	Notes
1995	Mighty Morphin Power Rangers	Ferrian	Episode: "A Friend in Need"
1995	Masked Rider	Ferrian	Episode: "Escape From Edenoi"
2000–04	Da Vinci's Inquest	Various roles	4 episodes
2001	Cold Squad	Informant 591	Episode: "Loose Ends"
2001	Sagwa, the Chinese Siamese Cat	Various Characters	Voice, 3 episodes
2001	Gadget and the Gadgetinis	Suzuki	Voice
2002	Dark Angel	Albino X	Episode: "Love Among the Runes"
2002	The Real World Movie: The Lost Season	Keith	Scripted TV special
2002	Andromeda	Burke	Episode: "The Risk-All Point"
2004	10.5	Drill Tech #2	Miniseries
2004	Kingdom Hospital	Anesthesiologist	5 episodes
2004–05	The L Word	Bryan Karikawa	3 episodes
2005	Stephen King's Dead Zone	Duffy	Episode: "Heroes and Demons"
2005	Supernatural	Alex	Episode: "Skin"
2006	Stargate SG-1	Caledonian Aide	Episode: "Ethon"
2007	Sanctuary	Andy Fetz	Miniseries
2008	Filminute 2008	Host	Television film
2010	Riverworld	Yoshinaka	Television film
2011–13	Falling Skies	Dai	21 episodes
2014	Hawaii Five-0	Alan Kim	Episode: "Ho'i Hou"
2014	The Startup	Mark	Television film
2015–16	Daredevil	Nobu	9 episodes
2019	Blood & Treasure	Yoshi	Episode: "The Curse of Cleopatra"
2022	Salvage Marines	Takeda	6 episodes

=== Web ===
Year	Title	Role	Notes
2011	Mortal Kombat: Legacy	Sektor	Episode: "Cyrax and Sektor"
2018	Hyperlight (Short)	Philip Maeda	
2021	(Murdoch Mysteries)	Hakuri Nakamura	Things we do for Love pt 1&2

=== Video games ===
Year	Title	Role	Notes
2025	Assassin's Creed Shadows	Fujibayashi Nagato	Voice
