= Maxim Knight =

American actor (born 1999)

- Born: August 21, 1999 (age 26); Honolulu, Hawaii, U.S.
- Occupation: Actor
- Years active: 2007–present

Maxim Knight (born August 21, 1999) is an American actor and voice actor who started acting at the age of seven. He is perhaps best known for his supporting role on the TNT television series Falling Skies (2011–2015).

== Biography ==
Maxim was born in Honolulu, Hawaii. He moved to Los Angeles at the age of five.

=== Career ===
Knight started acting in films at the age of eight. His first role was in All for Melissa in 2007 as Little Jared. He has also appeared in shorts including Gator Armstrong Plays with Dolls, Al’s Beef, How My Dad Killed Dracula, and Number One Dad. He guest starred in his first role, The Cleaner in 2009 as Aidan Kearn. He also starred in such television shows as Criminal Minds, Brothers & Sisters, Special Agent Oso and Sofia the First as Prince Desmond.

In 2011, he joined the cast of TNT's new sci-fi series Falling Skies, as Tom Mason's son Matt Mason. He was a series regular in all five seasons.

At the age of seven, Knight booked his first feature film, starring opposite Melissa Leo, Nick Cannon, Rosanna Arquette & Chris "Ludacris" Bridges in Ball Don't Lie. Maxim portrayed "Sticky", a young boy who is witness to his mother's suicide and has to face and ultimately triumph over life's challenges and unfair circumstances.

== Filmography ==
Film
Year	Title	Role	Notes
2007	All for Melissa	Little Jared	
2008	Gator Armstrong Plays with Dolls	Little Brother	Short
2008	Ball Don't Lie	Sticky	
2008	Al's Beef	The Boy	Short
2008	How My Dad Killed Dracula	Todd	Short
2008	Number One Dad	Bobby	Short
2008	The Coast	Paul	Short
2009	Slaughter	Cort	
2009	Family Dinner	Ryan O'Connell	Video short
2012	Trigger	Young Ryan	
2013	Medeas	Jacob	

Television
Year	Title	Role	Notes
2008	Frank TV	Goblin Trick-or-Treater	Episode: "Damn Frankies"
2008	Our First Christmas	Jacob	TV movie
2009	The Cleaner	Aidan Kern	Episode: "An Ordinary Man"
2009	Three Rivers	Dylan Campbell	Episode: "Where We Lie"
2009	Brothers & Sisters	Seth	Episode: "Nearlyweds"
2010	Criminal Minds	Carter	Episode: "Our Darkest Hour"
2010–12	Special Agent Oso	Various	6 episodes
2011	Funny or Die Presents	Connor	Episode: "#2.01"
2011	Parenthood	Henry	Episode: "Amazing Andy and His Wonderful World of Bugs"
2011	Wilfred	Andy Stevenson	Episode: "Isolation"
2011	CSI: Miami	Austin North	Episode: "Countermeasures"
2011	It's Always Sunny in Philadelphia	Benjamin	Episode: "Frank Reynolds' Little Beauties "
2011–2015	Falling Skies	Matt Mason	Main cast, 42 episodes
2012	Fish Hooks	Tetra Captain	Episode: "Just One of the Fish"
2012	Golden Christmas 3	Richie	TV movie
2012	Sofia the First: Once Upon a Princess	Prince Zandar	TV movie
2013	Sofia the First	Prince Desmond	3 episodes
2014	Chasing Life	Julian	2 episodes

== Awards and nominations ==
Year	Award	Category	Nominated work	Result	Ref
2009	30th Young Artist Awards	Best Performance in a TV Movie, Miniseries or Special - Leading Young Actor	Our First Christmas	Nominated	
2012	33rd Young Artist Awards	Best Performance in a TV Series - Supporting Young Actor	Falling Skies	Won	
2012	33rd Young Artist Awards	Best Performance in a TV Series - Guest Starring Young Actor 11-13	CSI: Miami	Nominated	
2013	34th Young Artist Awards	Best Performance in a TV Series - Supporting Young Actor	Falling Skies	Nominated	
2014	35th Young Artist Awards	Best Performance in a Feature Film - Leading Young Actor	Medeas	Nominated	
2014	35th Young Artist Awards	Best Performance in a TV Series - Supporting Young Actor	Falling Skies	Nominated	
2015	41st Saturn Awards	Best Performance by a Younger Actor in a Television Series	Falling Skies	Nominated	
