= Mpho Koaho =

Canadian actor

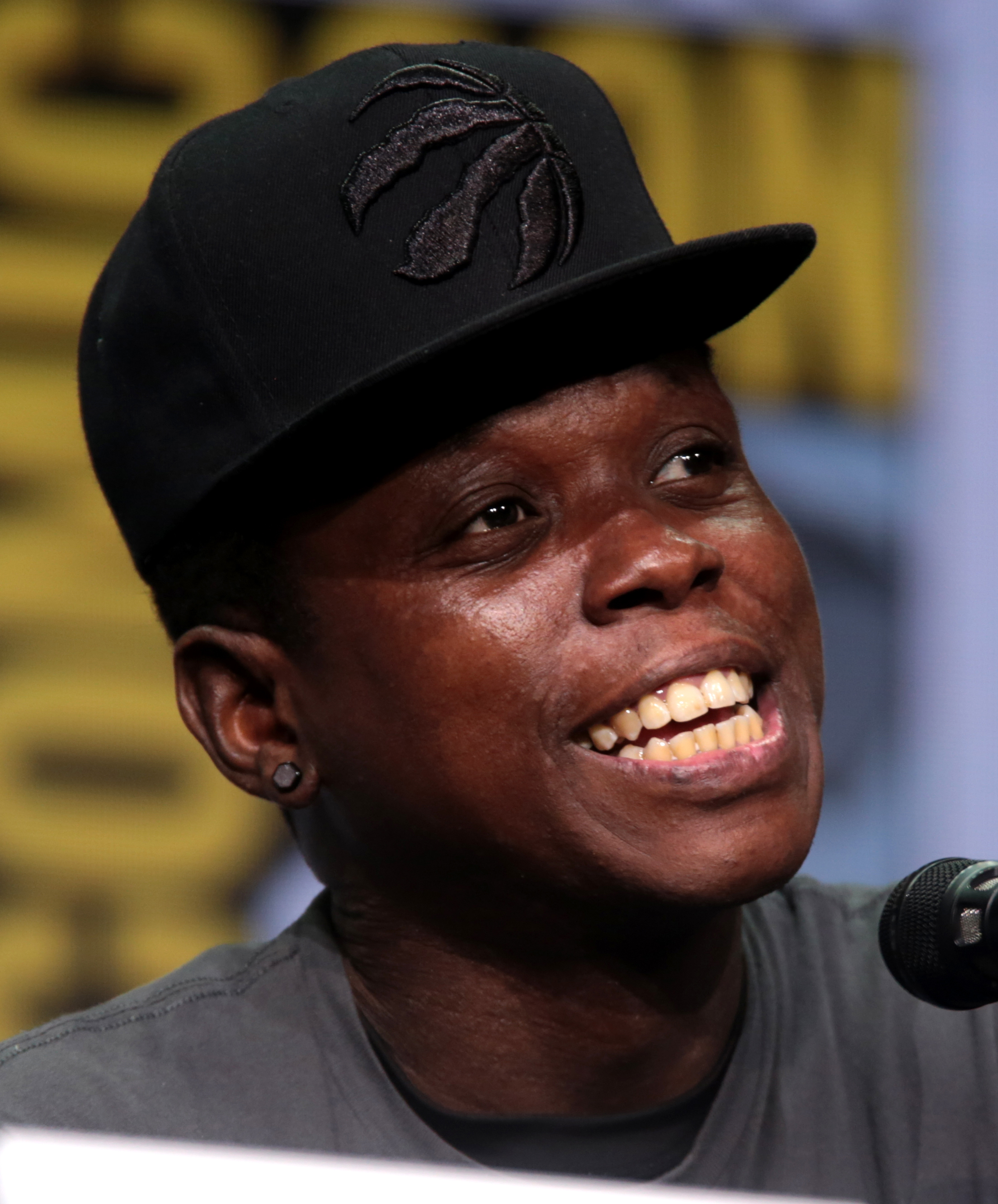
- Koaho at the 2017 San Diego Comic-Con
- Born: April 22, 1979 (age 47); Toronto, Ontario, Canada
- Occupation: Actor
- Years active: 1998–present

Mpho Koaho (/ˈʊmpoʊ ˈkwɑːhoʊ/) (born 22 April 1979) is a Canadian actor. He portrayed Anthony on the TNT science fiction series Falling Skies (2011–2015) and was also a series regular on the Teletoon action adventure MetaJets (2011) and the BBC America science fiction comedy Dirk Gently's Holistic Detective Agency (2016–2017).

== Early life and education ==
Mpho Koaho was born 22 April 1979 in Toronto, Ontario, Canada to South African parents.

== Career ==
Mpho began his acting career when Maya Angelou cast him as the lead in her 1998 Miramax film Down in the Delta. After that, he appeared in films such as The Salton Sea, Four Brothers, Get Rich or Die Tryin', and Saw III.

In 2009, Koaho was nominated to two Gemini Awards; one for his supporting role on the Canadian TV series Soul, and another for his guest role on the TV series Flashpoint. He ended up winning the former.

Mpho portrayed Anthony, a series regular on the TV series Falling Skies produced by Steven Spielberg, which began airing in June 2011.

In Dirk Gently's Holistic Detective Agency (2016–2017), he played Ken, the reluctant associate of "holistic assassin" Bart Curlish (Fiona Dourif).

== Filmography ==
=== Film ===
Year	Film	Role	Notes
1998	Down in the Delta	Thomas Sinclair	
1999	Both Sides of the Law	Pete Anderson	
2001	Snipes	Malik	
2002	Short Hymn, Silent War	Peter	Short film
2002	The Salton Sea	Kid Selling Guns	
2002	Partners in Action	Ty	
2003	Detention	Jay Tee Barrow	
2004	A Question	Unknown	Short film
2004	Haven	Kimo	
2005	Four Brothers	Gang Leader	
2005	Get Rich or Die Tryin'	"Junebug"	
2006	Saw III	Timothy	
2006	It's a Boy Girl Thing	"Horse"	
2008	Blindness	Pharmacist's Assistant	
2008	Poker Night	Simon	
2009	Saw VI	Timothy	
2011	Charlie Zone	Donny	
2012	Here I Come	Jay	Short film
2012	My Name Is Syn	Syn	Short film
2014	Black or White	Duvan	
2018	Night Hunter	Glasow	
2022	Pattern	Ajay	

=== Television ===
Year	Title	Role	Notes
1998	Goosebumps	Ben	Episode: "Awesome Ants"
1999	Sci-Squad	Durnsford	TV series
1999	Deep in My Heart	Roger	Television film
2000	Mail to the Chief	Ernie	Television film
2001	Soul Food	Brandon	Episode: "If You Don't Know Me By Now"
2002	Tracker	Jordan Baylor / Sirez	2 Episodes
2002	Doc	Marcus	Episode: "Sea No Evil"
2004	Crown Heights	Unknown	Television film
2005	Tilt	Hemphill	Episode: "The Game"
2005	Deacons for Defense	Baily	Television film
2005	Kojak	Lawrence Butler	Episode: "Kind of Blue"
2005	Tagged: The Jonathan Wamback Story	Trevor	Television film
2006	Doomstown	Paul "Countryman" Blackhall	Television film
2007	The Gathering	Tucker	TV miniseries
2008	ReGenesis	The Leader	Episode: "Unbottled"
2008	Flashpoint	Michael Jameson	Episode: "Never Kissed a Girl"
2009	Soul	Jamil	TV miniseries
2010	Rookie Blue	Unknown	Episode: "To Serve or Protect"
2011	Combat Hospital	Sergeant Geoffrey Daums	Episode: "Reason to Believe"
2011	MetaJets	Trey Jordan	TV series
2011–2015	Falling Skies	Anthony	TV series
2016	Dark Matter	Milo	Episode: "We should have seen this coming"
2016	Dirk Gently's Holistic Detective Agency	Ken	TV series
2017	The Expanse	Private Travis	TV series
2023	Murdoch Mysteries	Joey Witherspoon	Episode: "Cool Million"
2024	Tales From the Void	Harris	Episode: "Into the Unknown"
