= Robert Sean Leonard =

American actor (born 1969)

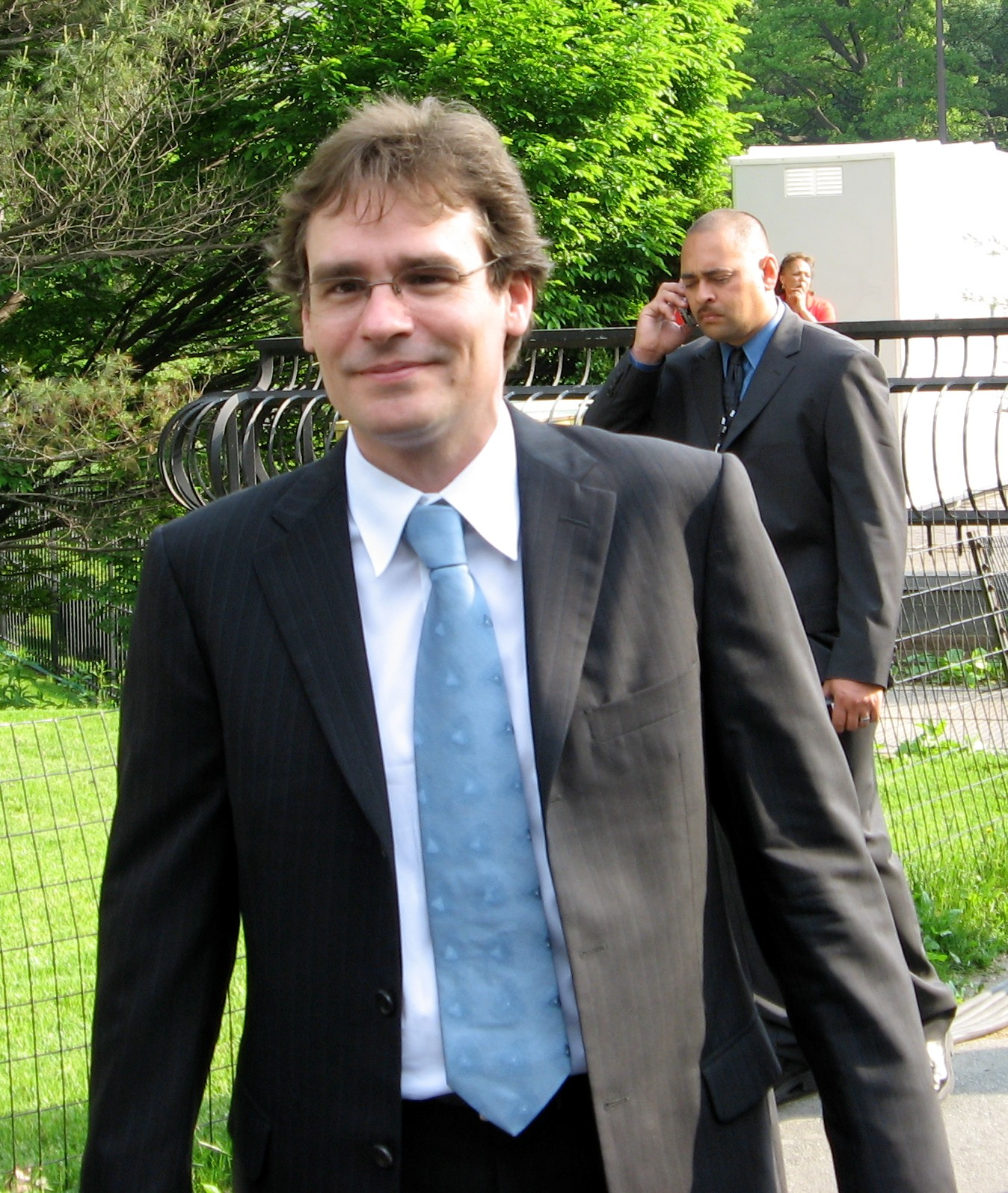
- Leonard in May 2007
- Born: Robert Lawrence Leonard; February 28, 1969 (age 57); Westwood, New Jersey, U.S.
- Occupation: Actor
- Years active: 1986–present
- Spouse: Gabriella Salick (m. 2008)
- Children: 3

Robert Lawrence Leonard (born February 28, 1969), known as Robert Sean Leonard, is an American actor. He has received a Tony Award and a Obie Award over the course of a career on both stage and screen that started in the 1980s. He is best known for his portrayal of Neil Perry in the drama film Dead Poets Society (1989) and Dr. James Wilson in the medical drama series House (2004–2012).

A prolific stage actor, Leonard won a Tony Award for Best Featured Actor in a Play for his performance in The Invention of Love in 2001. His other theater credits include Candida, Long Day's Journey Into Night, Breaking the Code, The Speed of Darkness, Philadelphia, Here I Come!, Arcadia, The Music Man, Born Yesterday, Fifth of July, and To Kill a Mockingbird.

== Early life ==
Robert Lawrence Leonard was born in Westwood, New Jersey, on February 28, 1969. He grew up in nearby Ridgewood, where he attended Ridgewood High School but later dropped out at 17 to pursue acting. He studied at Fordham University and later the Columbia University School of General Studies. He studied theater at HB Studio. He has a brother named Sean, whose name he adopted as his new middle name when the Screen Actors Guild advised him to take a stage name because Robert Leonard was already taken by another actor and Robert Lawrence Leonard seemed too long.

== Career ==
Leonard's early film roles included The Manhattan Project (1986), My Best Friend Is a Vampire (1987), and Dead Poets Society (1989). In 1993, he had a leading role in the film Swing Kids, playing Peter Müller, appeared in the Shakespeare film adaptation Much Ado About Nothing, and appeared in Martin Scorsese's The Age of Innocence. In 1997, he received rave reviews for his role in the television film In the Gloaming, directed by Christopher Reeve. Entertainment Weekly said that Leonard "does a first-rate job of juggling Danny's mixture of despair, neediness, and mordant jokiness."

Leonard and Ethan Hawke, who have been friends since co-starring in Dead Poets Society, co-founded New York's Malaparte theater company alongside James Waterston, Steve Zahn, and Frank Whaley in 1991. The company was officially dissolved in 2000, partly because its members wanted to devote more time to their families. Hawke later referred to the company's heyday as "pretty much the most thrilling period of [his] life".

Leonard is a three-time Tony Award nominee, and won Best Featured Actor in a Play in 2001 for his role as A. E. Housman in Tom Stoppard's The Invention of Love. He had previously played the role of Valentine in the New York premiere of Stoppard's Arcadia at Lincoln Center in 1995. He was nominated for a Tony in 2003 for his portrayal of Edmund Tyrone in a well-received revival of Eugene O'Neill's Long Day's Journey into Night, co-starring Philip Seymour Hoffman, Brian Dennehy, and Vanessa Redgrave. He has also appeared in Broadway musical productions, and replaced Craig Bierko as the lead performer in a revival of The Music Man in 2001. He co-starred as Paul Verrall in the 2011 Broadway revival of Born Yesterday.

From 2004 to 2012, Leonard portrayed Dr. James Wilson in the Fox medical drama series House. He had been invited to audition for the role of Charlie Eppes in the CBS crime drama series Numb3rs as well as House, and thought the Numb3rs script was "kind of cool", but decided to audition for House because he thought the character of Charlie was in "too many scenes". He later admitted, "The less I work, the happier I am." He believed that his House audition was not particularly good, but that his friendship with the show's executive producer Bryan Singer helped win him the role. In 2007, he appeared on Entertainment Weekly's 100 list as "Dr. Underrated".

From 2013 to 2014, Leonard had a recurring role as Dr. Roger Kadar on the series Falling Skies. In 2016, he played King Arthur in David Lee's adaptation of the musical Camelot at the Westport Country Playhouse. From February to April 2017, he appeared in the Broadway revival of Sunday in the Park with George as Jules/Bob. In 2023, he had a supporting role in HBO's The Gilded Age as the Reverend Luke Forte.

== Personal life ==
Leonard remains close friends with his House co-star Hugh Laurie. Another close friend of his is Ethan Hawke, who he co-starred with in Dead Poets Society and Tape, in addition to appearing in Hawke's directoral debut Chelsea Walls.

Leonard married Gabriella Salick in 2008. The couple have three daughters: one born in 2009, one in 2012 and one in 2018.

== Acting credits ==
=== Film ===
Year	Title	Role	Notes
1986	The Manhattan Project	Max	Credited as Robert Leonard
1987	My Best Friend Is a Vampire	Jeremy Capello	
1989	Dead Poets Society	Neil Perry	
1990	Mr. & Mrs. Bridge	Douglas Bridge	
1991	Married to It	Chuck Bishop	
1993	Swing Kids	Peter Müller	
1993	Much Ado About Nothing	Count Claudio	
1993	The Age of Innocence	Ted Archer	
1993	A Dog Race in Alaska		Short film
1994	Safe Passage	Alfred Singer	
1996	Killer: A Journal of Murder	Henry Lesser	
1996	I Love You, I Love You Not	Angel of Death	
1997	In the Gloaming	Danny	
1998	Standoff	Jamie Doolin	
1998	The Last Days of Disco	Tom Platt	
1998	Ground Control	Cruise	
2001	Tape	Jon Salter	
2001	Driven	Demille Bly	
2001	Chelsea Walls	Terry Olsen	
2004	The I Inside	Peter Cable	
2026	Act One	Tim	

=== Television ===
Year	Title	Role	Notes
1986	My Two Loves	Larry Taylor	Television film
1987	Bluffing It	Rusty Duggan	Television film
1993	The Tonight Show with Jay Leno	Himself	Season 2 Episode 31, aired July 19, 1993
1994	Normandy: The Great Crusade	Rusty Sales	Voice, television film
1996	The Boys Next Door	Barry Klemper	Television film
1999	Wasteland	Jesse's ex	Episode: "My Ex-Friend's Wedding"
2000	The Outer Limits	Robby Archer	Episode: "Nest"
2001	A Glimpse of Hell	Lt. Daniel P. Meyer	Television film
2002	Corsairs	Russell Wainwright	Unaired pilot
2003	A Painted House	Jesse Chandler	Television film
2004–2012	House	Dr. James Wilson	Main cast
2006, 2010	American Experience	Himself, Herman Melville	Episode: "Eugene O'Neill"; Voice, episode: "Into the Deep: America, Whaling & the World"
2013	The Blacklist	Frederick Barnes	Episode: "Frederick Barnes"
2013–2014	Falling Skies	Dr. Roger Kadar	Recurring; 9 episodes
2014	The Good Wife	Del Paul	Episode: "Dear God"
2015	Battle Creek	Brock	Episode: "Sympathy for the Devil"
2015–2016	Law & Order: Special Victims Unit	ADA Kenneth O'Dwyer	3 episodes
2017	Blue Bloods	Charles Beard	Episode: "Lost Souls"
2019	The Hot Zone	Walter Humboldt	Miniseries
2019	The Good Doctor	Shamus O'Malley	Episode: "Claire"
2022	The First Lady	Harry S. Truman	Episode: "Victory Dance"
2023	The Gilded Age	Reverend Luke Forte	Recurring; season 2
2026	The Terror: Devil in Silver	Director Cleave	Episode: "Vermillion"

=== Stage ===
Year	Title	Role	Location	Notes	Ref.
1985	Sally's Gone, She Left Her Name	Christopher Decker	Perry Street Theatre, Off-Broadway		
1985	The Beach House	Chris	Circle Repertory Theatre, Off-Broadway		
1986	Brighton Beach Memoirs	Eugene Jerome	Alvin Theatre, Broadway	Replacement	
1987–1988	Breaking the Code	Christopher Morcom	Neil Simon Theatre, Broadway		
1990	When She Danced	Alexandros Eliopolos	Playwrights Horizons, Off-Broadway		
1990	Romeo and Juliet	Romeo	Playhouse 91, Off-Broadway		
1991	Our Town	George Gibbs	Shaftesbury Theatre, West End		
1991	The Speed of Darkness	Eddie	Belasco Theatre, Broadway		
1993	Candida	Eugene Marchbanks	Criterion Center Stage Right, Broadway		
1993	King Lear	Edgar	Old Globe Theatre, San Diego		
1994	Philadelphia, Here I Come!	Gareth O'Donnell in Private	Criterion Center Stage Right, Broadway		
1995	Arcadia	Valentine Coverly	Vivian Beaumont Theater, Broadway		
1996	Below the Belt	Dobbitt	John Houseman Theatre, Off-Broadway		
1997	The Glass Menagerie	Tom Wingfield	Head Theatre, Baltimore		
1997	Dead End	Gimpty	Williamstown Theatre Festival, Massachusetts		
1998	You Never Can Tell	Dr. Valentine	Laura Pels Theater, Off-Broadway		
1999	The Iceman Cometh	Don Parritt	Brooks Atkinson Theatre, Broadway		
2000–2001	The Music Man	Harold Hill	Neil Simon Theatre, Broadway	Replacement	
2001	The Invention of Love	A. E. Housman, Aged 18 to 26	Lyceum Theatre, Broadway		
2003, 2004	Fifth of July	Kenneth Talley Jr.	Signature Theatre Company, Off-Broadway; Skirball Cultural Center		,
2003	Long Day's Journey into Night	Edmund Tyrone	Plymouth Theatre, Broadway		
2003	The Violet Hour	John Pace Seavering	Biltmore Theatre, Broadway		
2011–2012	Born Yesterday	Paul Verrall	Cort Theatre, Broadway		
2013	To Kill a Mockingbird	Atticus Finch	Regent's Park Open Air Theatre, Off-West-End		
2013	Pygmalion	Professor Henry Higgins	Old Globe Theatre, San Diego		
2016	Prodigal Son	Alan Hoffman	Manhattan Theatre Club, Off-Broadway		
2016	Camelot	King Arthur	Westport Country Playhouse		
2017	Sunday in the Park with George	Jules / Bob	Hudson Theatre, Broadway		
2017	Richard II	Richard II	Old Globe Theatre, San Diego		
2018	Edward Albee's At Home at the Zoo	Peter	Signature Theatre, Off-Broadway		
2025	Betrayal	Jerry	Goodman Theatre, Chicago		
2025	Interview	Pierre Peters	Riverside Studios		
2026	An American Daughter	Walter Abramson	Pershing Square Signature Center, Off-Broadway		

== Awards and nominations ==
Award	Year (Note: Year in which the ceremony was held.)	Category	Nominated work	Result	Ref.
Chicago Film Critics Association	1990	Most Promising Actor	Dead Poets Society	Nominated	
Drama League Award	2018	Distinguished Performance	Edward Albee's At Home at the Zoo	Nominated	
Obie Awards	2018	Performance Award	Edward Albee's At Home at the Zoo	Won	
Outer Critics Circle Awards	2001	Outstanding Featured Actor in a Play	The Invention of Love	Won	
Screen Actors Guild Awards	2008	Outstanding Performance by an Ensemble in a Drama Series	House	Nominated	
Screen Actors Guild Awards	2024	Outstanding Performance by an Ensemble in a Drama Series	The Gilded Age	Nominated	
Tony Awards	1993	Best Performance by a Featured Actor in a Play	Candida	Nominated	
Tony Awards	2001	Best Performance by a Featured Actor in a Play	The Invention of Love	Won	
Tony Awards	2003	Best Performance by a Featured Actor in a Play	Long Day's Journey into Night	Nominated	
