= Jessy Schram =

American actress and model

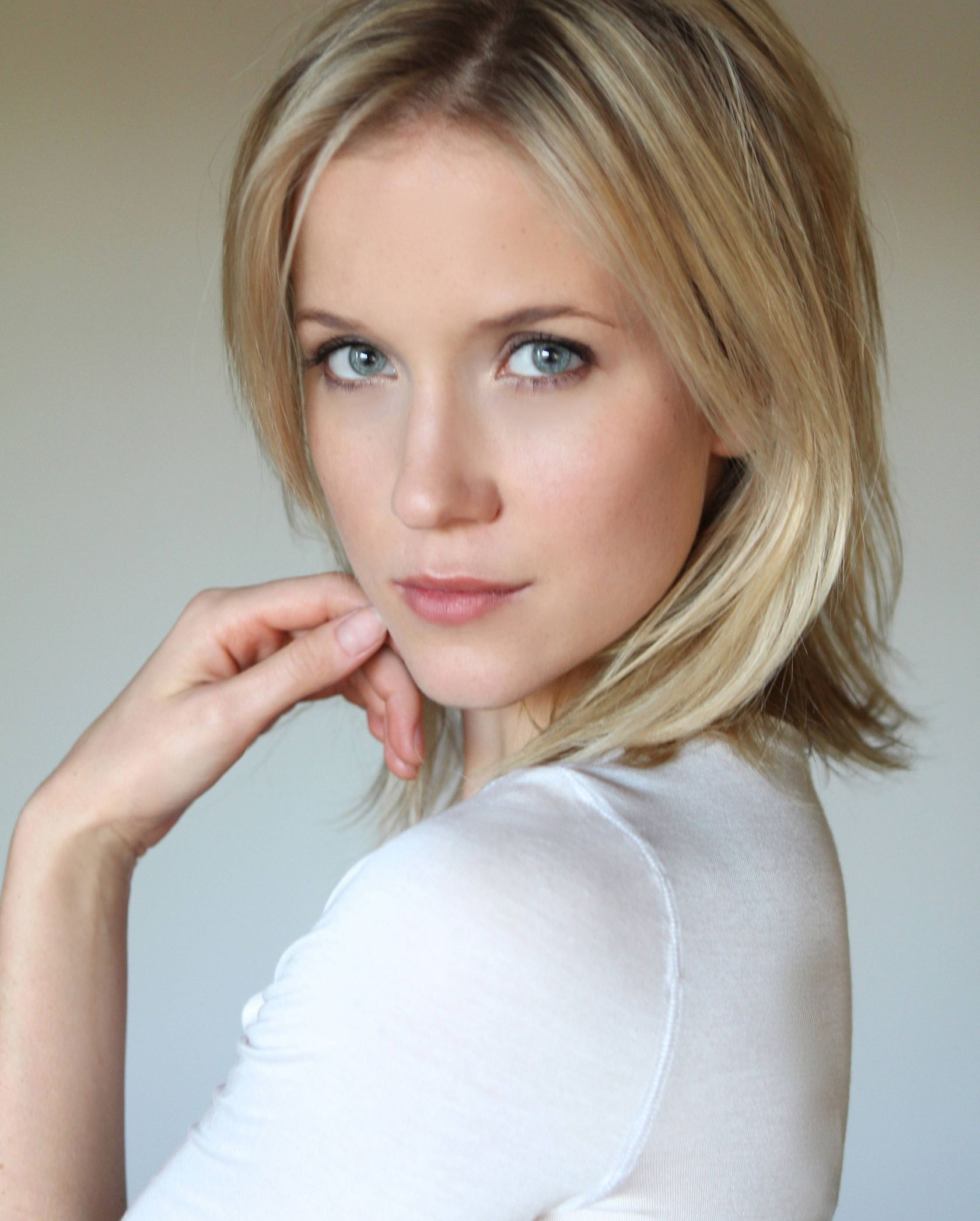
- Jessy Schram
- Born: Skokie, Illinois, U.S.
- Occupations: Actress, model
- Years active: 2004–present
- Spouse: Sterling Taylor (m. 2023)

Jessy Schram is an American actress, model and singer. Her most notable roles include Hannah Griffith in Veronica Mars, Rachel Seybolt in Life, Karen Nadler in Falling Skies, Cinderella/Ashley Boyd in Once Upon a Time and Dr. Hannah Asher in Chicago Med.

== Early life ==
Schram was born in Skokie, Illinois. She was raised in nearby Buffalo Grove and graduated from Buffalo Grove High School in 2004. Schram modeled and appeared in television commercials as a child, and began performing in musical theatre at age 12. Schram moved to Los Angeles after graduation to pursue a career in acting.

== Career ==
Early in her career, she appeared in television commercials for Retin-A Micro and Kentucky Fried Chicken. Her first on-screen appearance was a role as Larissa in the episode "Number One Fan" of Nickelodeon's sitcom Drake & Josh. In 2005, she played Susan Davis on Hallmark Channel's Jane Doe series of television movies. She also appeared in four episodes of the television series Veronica Mars as Hannah Griffith, who becomes Logan Echolls' girlfriend. She has appeared in several guest starring television roles, including CSI: Miami, Without a Trace, House, Ghost Whisperer, Medium, The Mentalist and Boston Legal.

In 2008, she starred in the drama film Keith and appeared as Tracy in the comedy film American Pie Presents: The Naked Mile (2006). She was featured on Maxim magazine's website in their "Today's Girl" feature. In 2009, she was featured in a music video for J. R. Richards' song "A Beautiful End". Schram appeared in Tony Scott's action thriller film Unstoppable (2010), playing Darcy, the estranged wife of Chris Pine's character.

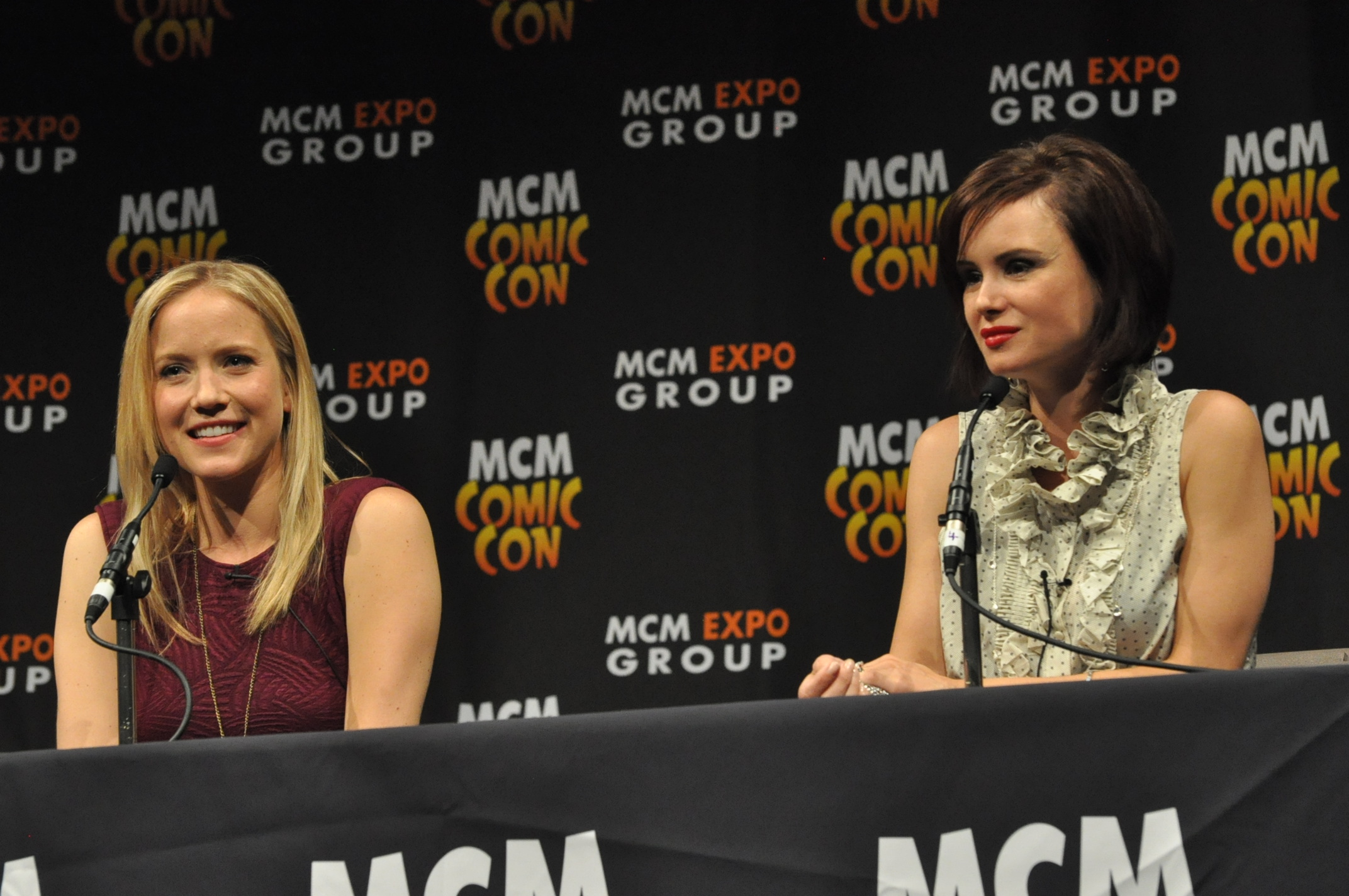
Schram (left) and Keegan Connor Tracy (right) attending MCM London Comic Con's Once Upon a Time Panel in 2013.

In 2011, Schram joined the main cast for the first season of the TNT science-fiction series Falling Skies. Her character was reduced to a recurring role in seasons two and three, then to guest appearances in season four. Between 2011 and 2016, Schram appeared in four episodes of the television series Once Upon a Time, playing Cinderella/Ashley Boyd. She reprised the role in the 2013 premiere of Once Upon a Time in Wonderland.

In 2012, she portrayed Christine Kendal on ABC's military drama series Last Resort. In 2015, Schram portrayed Cash Gray in the fourth season of musical drama series Nashville. She landed a role as Jennifer in crime thriller film Shot Caller (2017), which received generally positive reviews from critics. In December 2019, Schram was cast as Dr. Hannah Asher on the NBC's drama series Chicago Med. Initially a recurring role in the series's fifth season that ended with the sixth season's premiere, she returned in season seven in a series regular capacity.

Schram is also a singer-songwriter and has toured with Chicago blues artist Joan Baby.

On June 18, 2023, Schram married longtime boyfriend Sterling Taylor, near her hometown of Buffalo Grove, in Chicago.

== Filmography ==
=== Film ===
Year	Title	Role	Notes
2006	I Want Someone to Eat Cheese With	Fake Daughter	
2006	American Pie Presents: The Naked Mile	Tracy Sterling	
2008	Keith	Courtney	
2010	Unstoppable	Darcy Colson	
2015	Pillow Talk	Jennifer	Short film
2015	The Submarine Kid	Emily	
2015	Instant Nanny	Libby	
2017	Thirst	Melody	Short film
2017	The Beautiful Ones	Angela Morot	
2017	Shot Caller	Jennifer	

=== Television ===
Year	Title	Role	Notes
2004	Drake & Josh	Larissa	Episode: "Number One Fan"
2005	Jane Doe: Vanishing Act	Susan Davis	Television film (Hallmark)
2005	Jane Doe: Now You See It, Now You Don't	Susan Davis	Television film (Hallmark)
2005	Jane Doe: Til Death Do Us Part	Susan Davis	Television film (Hallmark)
2005	Jane Doe: The Wrong Face	Susan Davis	Television film (Hallmark)
2005–07	Medium	Young Allison	2 episode
2006	Jane Doe: Yes, I Remember It Well	Susan Davis	Television film (Hallmark)
2006	Jane Doe: The Harder They Fall	Susan Davis	Television film (Hallmark)
2006	Veronica Mars	Hannah Griffith	4 episodes
2006	Split Decision	Lennie Priestley	Unaired pilot
2006	Boston Legal	Claire Wilson	Episode: "The Nutcrackers"
2007	House	Leah	Episode: "Needle in a Haystack"
2007	Ghost Whisperer	Rana Thomas	Episode: "Mean Ghost"
2007	Without a Trace	Ella Neese	Episode: "Two of Us"
2007	CSI: Miami	Candace Walker	Episode: "Cyber-Lebrity"
2007	Jane Doe: Ties That Bind	Susan Davis	Television film (Hallmark)
2007	Jane Doe: How to Fire Your Boss	Susan Davis	Television film (Hallmark)
2007–09	Life	Rachel Seybolt	8 episodes
2008	Jane Doe: Eye of the Beholder	Susan Davis	Television film (Hallmark)
2009	Limelight	Georgia Peech	Television film
2009	Saving Grace	Sayre Hanadarko	Episode: "Do You Believe in Second Chances?"
2009	Hawthorne	Crystal Raymond	Episode: "Night Moves"
2009	Crash	Kim	3 episodes
2010	Betwixt	Morgan Brower	Television film (The CW)
2010	Night and Day	Sarah Hollister	Television film (TNT)
2010	The Mentalist	Rachel Bowman / Sherry Winger	Episode: "Ball of Fire"
2011	Traffic Light	Erica	Episode: "Bonebag"
2011–14	Falling Skies	Karen Nadler	Main (season 1); Recurring (seasons 2–3); Guest (season 4); 15 episodes
2011–16	Once Upon a Time	Ashley Boyd/Cinderella	4 episodes
2012	A Smile as Big as the Moon	Robynn	Television film (Hallmark Hall of Fame)
2012–13	Last Resort	Christine Kendal	Main role (13 episodes)
2013	Once Upon a Time in Wonderland	Ashley Boyd	Episode: "Down the Rabbit Hole"
2013	Riding Shotgun	Abby	Video short
2014	Mad Men	Bonnie Whiteside	4 episodes
2015	The Lizzie Borden Chronicles	Nance O'Keefe	Recurring role
2015	Major Crimes	Courtney Henson	Episode: "Sorry I Missed You"
2015	Harvest Moon	Jen Stone	Television film (Hallmark)
2015	Reluctant Nanny	Libby Prescott	Television film
2015–16	Nashville	Cash Gray	Recurring role (11 episodes)
2017	Birthday Wish	Gwen Turner	Television film (Hallmark)
2017	A Royal New Year's Eve	Caitlyn	Television film (Hallmark)
2017–18	The Nine Lives of Claw	Purrnelope	3 episodes
2018	Road to Christmas	Maggie Baker	Television film (Hallmark)
2019	Lucifer	Leona	Episode: "Expire Erect"
2020	Amazing Winter Romance	Julia Miller	Television film (Hallmark)
2020	Country at Heart	Shayna Judson	Television film (Hallmark)
2020	A Nashville Christmas Carol	Vivienne	Television film (Hallmark)
2020–present	Chicago Med	Dr. Hannah Asher	Recurring (season 5); Guest (season 6); Main (season 7–present)
2021	Time for Them to Come Home for Christmas	Jane / Rebecca	Television film (Hallmark)
2023	Fantasy Island	Laura (Jilted Bride)	Episode: "Peaches and the Jilted Bride"
2023	Chicago Fire	Dr. Hannah Asher	Episode: "Never, Ever Make a Mistake"
2023	Mystic Christmas	Juniper	Television film (Hallmark)
2025	A Suite Holiday Romance	Sabrina Parker	Television film (Hallmark)
