= Connor Jessup =

Canadian actor (born 1994)

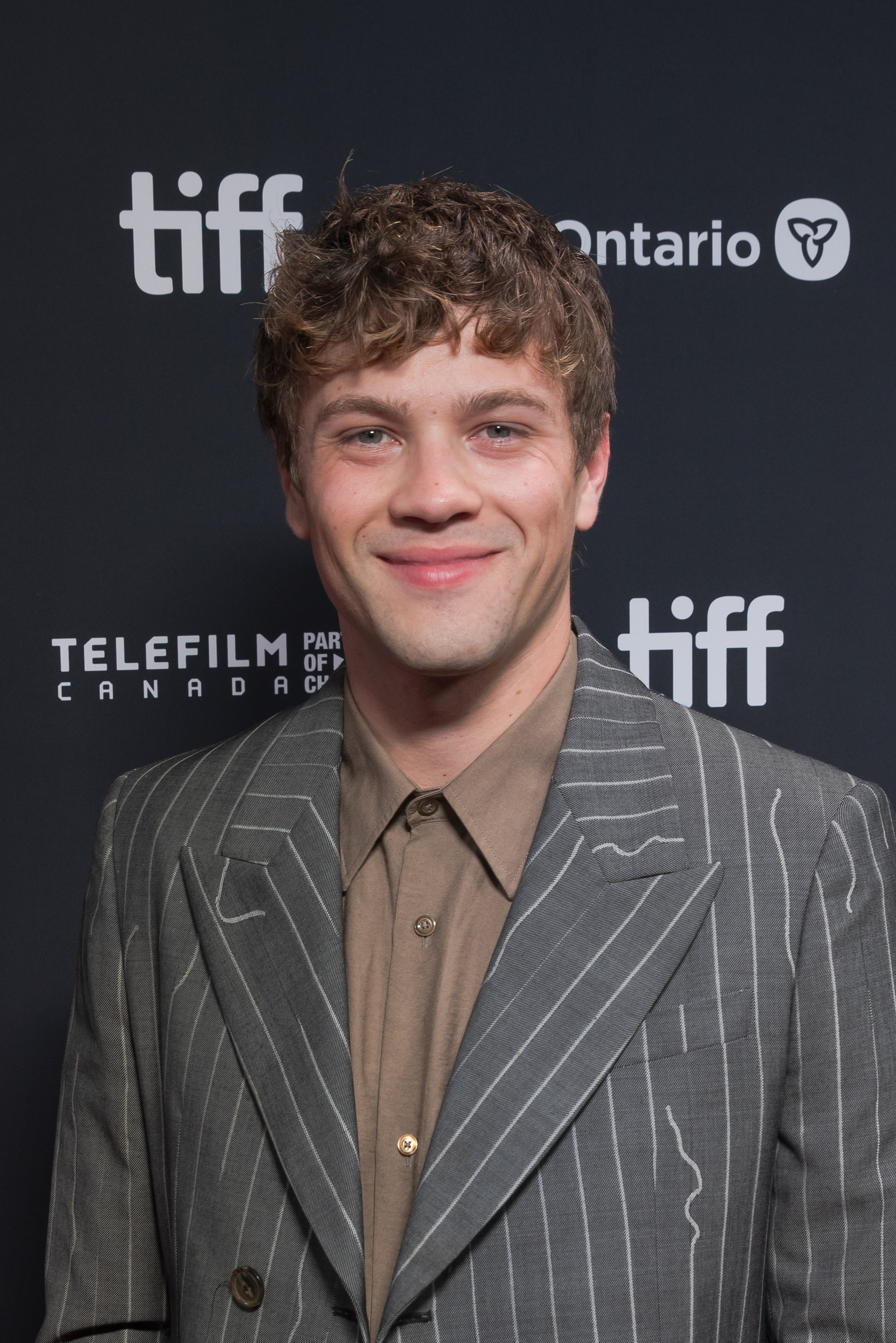
- Jessup in 2025
- Born: Connor William Jessup; June 23, 1994 (age 32); Toronto, Ontario, Canada
- Occupation: Actor
- Years active: 2005–present

Connor William Jessup (born June 23, 1994) is a Canadian actor. He is known for his roles as Ben Mason on the TNT science fiction television series Falling Skies (2011–2015), Taylor Blaine and Coy Henson in the ABC anthology series American Crime (2016–2017), and Tyler Locke in the Netflix series Locke & Key (2020–2022). He has also starred in feature films, most notably in Blackbird (2012) and Closet Monster (2015).

== Career ==
=== Acting ===
Jessup began acting at the age of 11 as a child actor. After various early jobs, including a role in a stage adaptation of The Full Monty, Jessup got a lead role in the children's television series The Saddle Club, for which he is also credited with conceptualizing the plot of one episode. He served as executive producer for the independent film Amy George, which played at the 2011 Toronto International Film Festival.

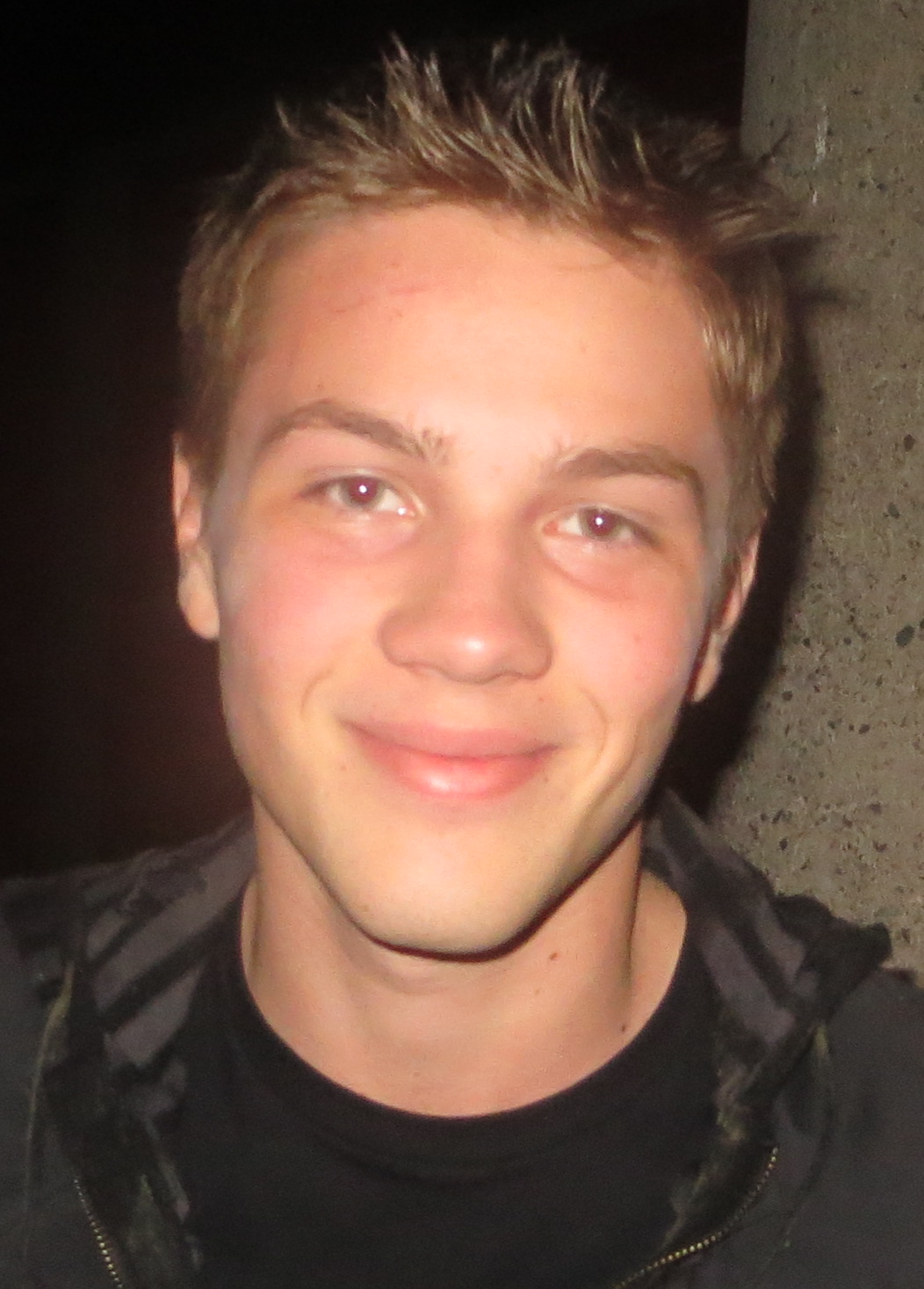
Jessup on the set of Falling Skies in 2013

In 2011, Jessup was cast as a main character in the TNT science fiction series Falling Skies. He starred on the show for five seasons.

In 2012, Jessup starred in the Canadian independent film Blackbird, in which he played a troubled teen falsely accused of planning a school shooting. Jessup's performance received positive reviews and the film won various awards, including the Best Canadian First Feature Film award at the 2012 Toronto International Film Festival. The film won three awards at the Atlantic Film Festival and won the Vancouver International Film Festival award for Best Canadian Feature Film. It also screened at the Cannes Film Festival.

In 2015, Jessup starred in the feature film Closet Monster, which won the Best Canadian Film Award at the 2015 Toronto International Film Festival, and screened at various film festivals around the world, before subsequently being released nationwide in July 2016.

In 2016, Jessup starred in the Emmy-winning ABC series American Crime as Taylor Blaine. His performance was praised by critics. He returned for the third season as Coy Henson.

In 2018, Jessup was cast as Tyler Locke, one of the main roles in the Netflix series Locke & Key, an adaptation of Joe Hill and Gabriel Rodriguez's popular comic series of the same name.

Jessup will star in Apichatpong Weerasethakul's upcoming film Jengira's Magnificent Dream.

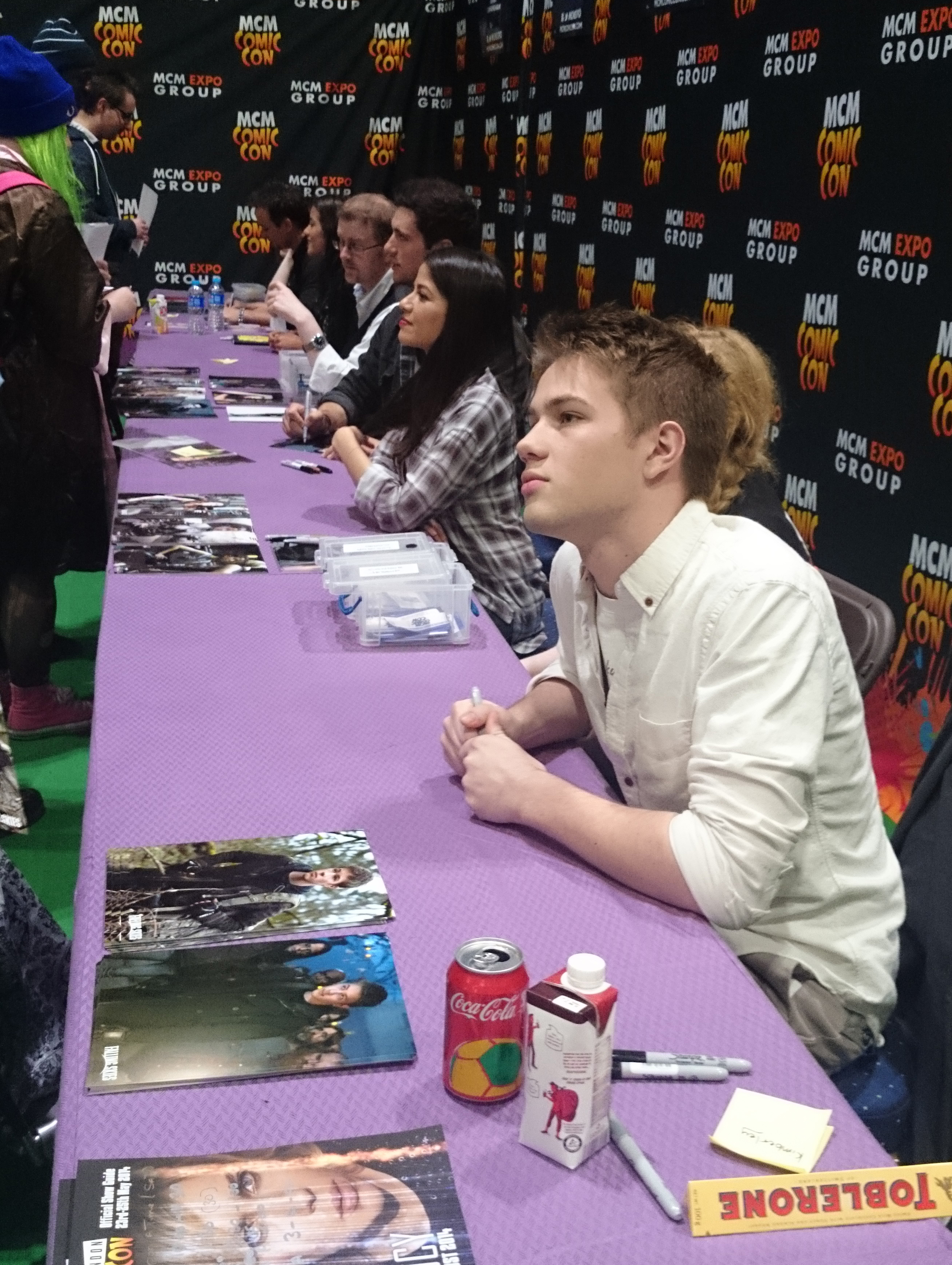
Jessup at London Comic Con in 2014

=== Filmmaking ===
Jessup has stated in numerous interviews that his intention is to work in the film industry beyond acting, as a director and filmmaker. In an interview with the Toronto Star, Jessup said that directing "is where my mind and heart [are] at the moment". In 2014, Jessup starred in the short film Fragments and in 2015, Jessup's short film Boy, which he wrote and directed and was funded by bravoFACT, premiered at the 2015 Toronto International Film Festival.

In 2016, Jessup was included in Filmmaker Magazine's annual list of the 25 New Faces of Independent Film. His short film Lira's Forest, which he wrote and directed, premiered at the 2017 Toronto International Film Festival. Jessup wants to expand this story with a feature film, Simon's Forest.

In 2017, it was announced that Jessup would be directing a documentary profile of Thai filmmaker Apichatpong Weerasethakul for FilmStruck and The Criterion Collection. The film was released in the second quarter of 2018.

In 2019, he produced the omnibus film 30/30 Vision: 3 Decades of Strand Releasing, which included short films by Ira Sachs, Catherine Breillat, Cindy Sherman, Athina Rachel Tsangari, Brady Corbet, Rithy Pahn, Lulu Wang and more. He contributed his own film to the program, Night Flight, inspired by the book by Antoine de Saint-Exupéry.

Julian and the Wind, a short film written and directed by Jessup, premiered at the Toronto International Film Festival in September 2024. Jessup directed the music videos for Frances Whitney's "Biggest Fan" and Sebastian Croft's debut single "Tokyo", which were both released in 2025.

== Influences ==
As a director, Jessup has expressed a particular fascination with Japanese film and culture and has stated in interviews that he is highly influenced by East Asian cinema, including directors Hirokazu Kore-eda, Edward Yang, Yasujirō Ozu, Hayao Miyazaki, Isao Takahata, and Apichatpong Weerasethakul. He has also expressed admiration for directors Abbas Kiarostami, Andrew Haigh, and Ira Sachs.

== Personal life ==
Jessup is gay and came out publicly in a post on Instagram in June 2019.

== Filmography ==
=== Film ===
Year	Title	Role	Type
2012	Blackbird	Sean Randall	
2014	Skating to New York	Casey Demas	
2015	Closet Monster	Oscar Madly	
2019	Strange But True	Ronnie	
2019	Disappearance at Clifton Hill		
2019	White Lie	Owen	
2025	Peak Everything	Tom	
TBA	Jenjira's Magnificent Dream	TBA	

=== Television ===
Year	Title	Role	Notes
2007	The Jon Dore Television Show	Bat Throwing Kid #3	Episode: "Jon Gets Scared"
2008–2009	The Saddle Club	Simon Atherton	Main role (series 3)
2011	King	Ben Moser	Episode: "Eleni Demaris"
2011–2015	Falling Skies	Ben Mason	Main role Nominated—Saturn Award for Best Performance by a Younger Actor in a Television Series; Nominated—Young Artist Award for Best Younger Supporting Actor in a Television Series
2016–2017	American Crime	Taylor Blaine / Coy Henson	Main role (season 2); recurring role (season 3)
2020–2022	Locke & Key	Tyler Locke	Main role
2021	Canada's Drag Race	Himself	Guest judge, episode "Snatch Game"

=== Filmmaking credits ===
Year	Title	Director	Writer	Producer	Notes
2015	Boy	Yes	Yes	Yes	Short film
2017	Lira's Forest	Yes	Yes	Yes	Short film
2018	A.W. A Portrait of Apichatpong Weerasethakul	Yes	Yes	No	Documentary
2019	30/30 Vision: 3 Decades of Strand Releasing (segment "Night Flight")	Yes	Yes	No	Anthology film
2024	Julian and the Wind	Yes	Yes	Yes	Short film
2025	Frances Whitney – "Biggest Fan"	Yes	No	Yes	Music video
2025	Sebastian Croft – "Tokyo"	Yes	No	No	Music video
