= Final Score (2007 film) =

- The Thai theatrical poster.
- Directed by: Soraya Nagasuwan
- Produced by: Jira Maligool; Prasert Wiwattananonpong; Yongyoot Thongkongtoon; Chenchonnee Soonthornsaratul; Suwimon Techasupinan
- Cinematography: Anurak Kongka
- Edited by: Saranee Wongpan; Chartchai Ketnust
- Music by: Hualumpong Rhythm
- Distributed by: GTH
- Release date: 1 February 2007
- Running time: 120 minutes
- Country: Thailand
- Language: Thai

Final Score (Thai: 365 วันตามติดชีวิตเด็กเอ็นท์ or 365 Wan Tam Tid Cheewit Dek Ent) is a 2007 Thai documentary film directed by Soraya Nagasuwan and produced by Jira Maligool. The film follows four Mattayom 6 students for one year as they take their university entrance exams.

== Synopsis ==
The film focuses on Suwikrom "Per" Amaranon, a middle class Thai student in his senior year at Suankularb Wittayalai School in Bangkok, and his three friends, Big Show, Lung and Boat. They are depicted as average students, not especially studious but are still obedient of their parents and are hopeful of their prospects for getting into a university in Thailand.

The film follows the boys through one year, from May 2005 to May 2006. Documentarian Soraya Nagasuwan is never heard asking the boys questions, simply letting her camera crew follow the boys through their days at school, at home with their families or enjoying time off school while on a visit to the beach and attending a rock music festival.

In order to qualify for admission to a university faculty, students must take standardized tests. In Thailand these tests are the O-Net/A-Net exams. Minimum scores are needed in order to be admitted to certain universities and university faculties.

Coincidentally, the February 2006 exams that the boys took were hit with a scandal after the results were incorrectly reported. Approximately 300,000 students were affected by error, with many puzzled over receiving test results when they had not even taken the tests.

The boys weather the pressure of taking the exams and the erroneous reporting of the scores, however, and ultimately win their choice of disciplines and universities.

== Cast ==
- Suwikrom "Per" Amaranon (สุวิกรม อัมระนันทน์)
- Sarawut "Boat" Panyatheera (สราวุฒิ ปัญญาธีระ )
- Worapat "Lung" Chittkhaew (วรภัทร จิตต์แก้ว )
- Kittipong "Big Show" Wichitcharussakul (กิตติพงศ์ วิจิตรจรัสสกุล)

== Production ==
=== Filming ===
Producer Jira Maligool and director Soraya Nagasuwan started casting for subjects at tutor schools in the Siam Square in February 2005. From 100 candidates, they narrowed the search to 10 finalists and followed each for one day.

"I didn't want a student with particularly good grades or a kid who was always skipping school," the director was quoted as saying in The Nation newspaper.

A five-person crew followed Per and his three friends for one year, using a high-definition digital video camera. The boys were not interviewed and no shots were posed, the director said.

"Filmmakers often use interviews to manipulate attitudes. Questions are asked from the filmmaker's point of view so the answers can't be unconditional. That's why I prefer not to use that technique," Soraya said.

=== Director ===
Director Soraya Nagasuwan had previously worked as an assistant director under producer-director Jira Maligool on The Tin Mine. Before that, she had directed the documentary short film, Amazing Thailand, about prostitution in Thailand. Jira said he chose Soraya for the Final Score project because he was impressed with her work on The Tin Mine. "She's very tough and has a special character. You feel you can trust her with your secrets," Jira was quoted as saying in an interview with The Nation newspaper.

== Reception ==
Final Score had a wide release in Thailand cinemas on February 1, 2007.

The film has been criticized for not taking the Thailand government's Ministry of Education to task for its misreporting of the A-Net/O-Net standardized test results, and instead making the documentary fit GTH Films' "feel-good" film formula.

"I believe Final Score, a well-meaning and fairly charming film, could push itself much further to give us a less polished reflection of the truth. In other words, what we see here on screen is interesting, but I'm curious if what we don't see – the footage that didn't make it into the final cut – would be even more so," said Bangkok Post film critic Kong Rithdee.

Thailand-based film critic Peter Nellhaus said he felt the test result error is "given rather short shrift considering the magnitude of the number of students affected."

The director acknowledged the criticism, saying that the film's overall tone was made to fit the film production company's "marketing model."

"The studio didn't want the film to be too controversial," director Soraya Nakhasuwan was quoted as saying in The Nation.

== Soundtrack ==
Final Score ... And More

Soundtrack album by various artists
- Released: February 14, 2007
- Genre: Thai rock
- Length: 60:05
- Label: Sony BMG

Along with a score by Hualumpong Rhythm, the film features music by indie rock bands Modern Dog and Pru, including a live performance by Pru at the 2005 Fat Festival. A soundtrack album featuring music from the film and additional music tracks was released on February 14, 2007 on the Sony BMG Music Entertainment (Thailand) label.

=== Track listing ===
1. "Passage" (ชีวิตไม่เคยเปลี่ยน ) – Pru (1:23)
2. "Puen auey" (เพื่อนเอ๋ย ) – Pru (4:22)
3. "Gun lae gun" (กันและกัน) – Modern Dog (4:43)
4. "See Scape" – Scrubb (4:18)
5. "Parn" (ผ่าน) – Slot Machine (4:02)
6. "Nalika" (นาฬิกา) – Buddhist Holiday (3:25)
7. "Took sing" (ทุกสิ่ง) – Pru (5:43)
8. "Tar sawang" (ตาสว่าง) – Modern Dog (5:25)
9. "Kwarn lhung" (ความหลัง) – Flure (4:11)
10. "Chewit tee luek eng" (ชีวิตที่เลือกเอง ) – The Peach Band (4:22)
11. "Sieng karng nai jit jai" (เสียงข้างในจิตใจ) – P.O.P. (3:32)
12. "Ploi mun pai" (ปล่อยมันไป) – Run Forward (3:08)
13. "Puen tae" (เพื่อนแท้) – Crescendo (3:56)
14. "Ruk kun" (รักคุณ) – Pru (4:01)
15. "Kor kwarm" (ข้อความ) – Pause (4:22)
16. "Korb kun" (ขอบคุณ) – Modern Dog (4:12)
