= Krissada Sukosol Clapp =

Krissada Terrence กฤษดา สุโกศล แคลปป์
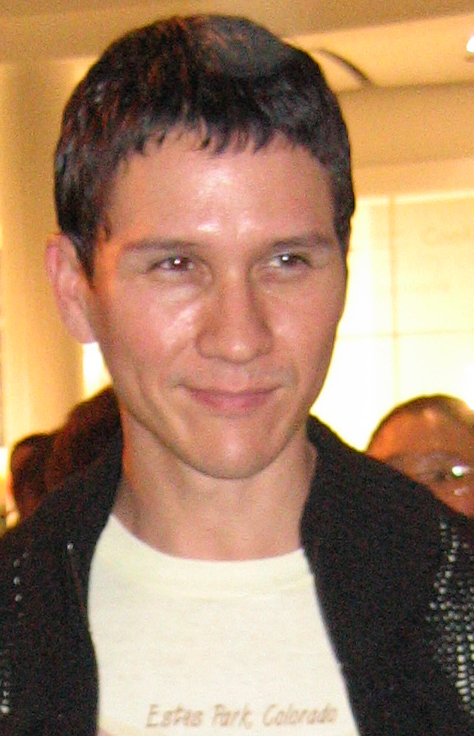
- Clapp at the world premiere of King Naresuan in 2007

Background information
- Also known as: Noi Pru; น้อย วงพรู
- Born: Krissada Sukosol Clapp; 26 December 1970 (age 55); Bangkok, Thailand
- Occupations: Singer; dancer; actor

Krissada Sukosol Clapp (Thai: กฤษดา สุโกศล แคลปป์, RTGS: Kritsada Sukoson Khlaep; also known as Krissada Terrence, Noi S. Clapp or Noi Pru; born 26 December 1970) is a Thai pop singer, actor and a member of the Thai pop band Pru. His film roles include Bangkok Loco, The Adventure of Iron Pussy and 13 Beloved.

== Early life ==
Clapp was born to an American father, Terrence H. Clapp, and a Thai mother, Kamala Sukosol, a jazz singer and heiress of the Siam City Hotels and Resorts chain. He studied anthropology at Boston University and waited tables in New York City while auditioning for theater roles.

== Career ==
=== Music ===
In 2001, he formed the band Pru with his older brother, guitarist-producer Kamol Sukosol. The band releases records on BEC-TERO's Bakery Music label, distributed through BMG Sony Music Entertainment (Thailand). Pru received the favorite band (Thailand) award at the 2002 MTV Asia Awards. The band built its reputation on its live shows, which feature the lanky, active Noi as lead singer. He dances athletically around the stage, and in one incident, he jumped up to a giant speaker, fell, and broke his leg. The band still performed while Noi's leg was in a cast, however. Noi still danced, sitting on a chair and using just his upper body to dance the same routines. Noi was among the Thai artists performing in The Ramakien: A Rak Opera on 28–30 July 2006 at the Lincoln Center for Performing Arts, a rock opera adaptation of the Ramakien national epic.

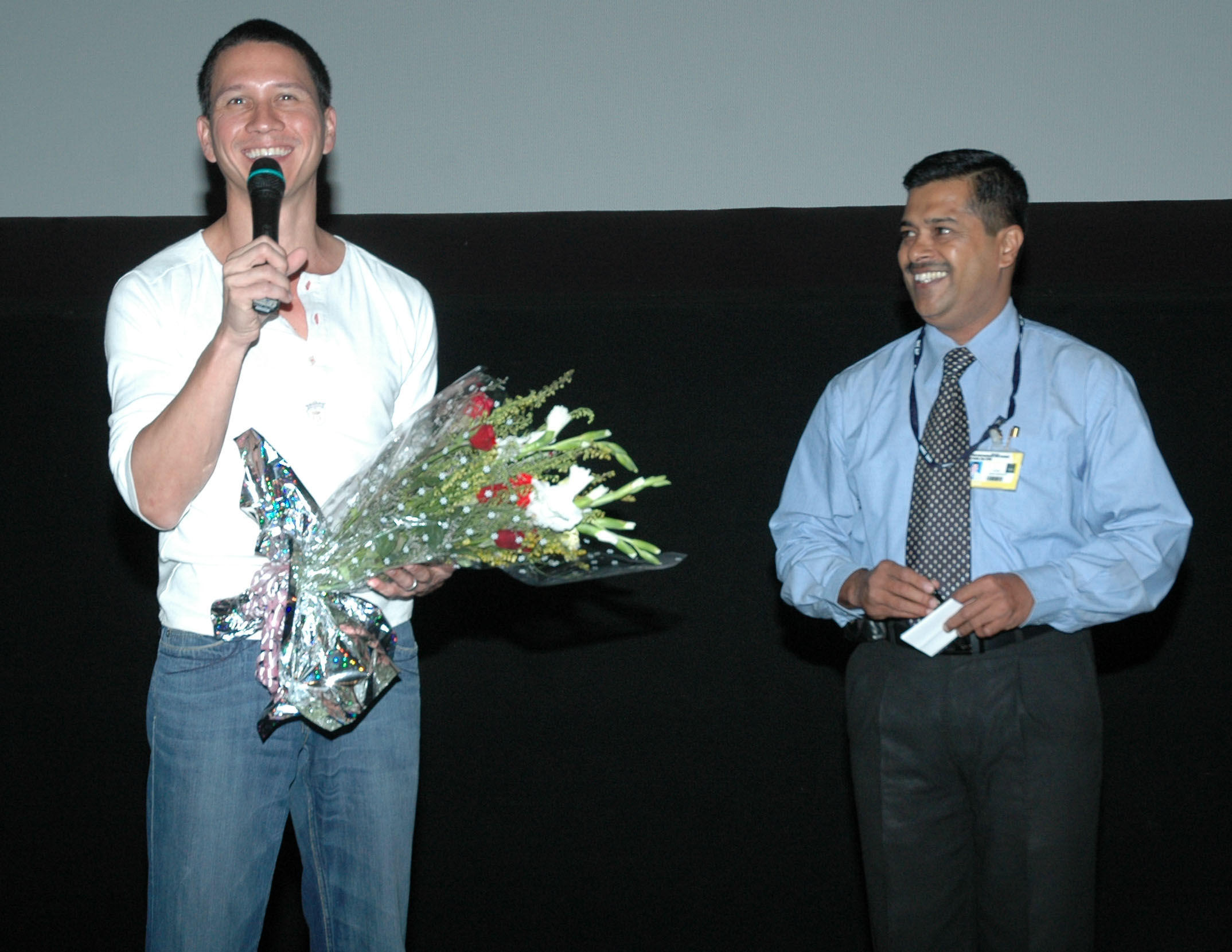
Clapp at the presentation of the film, A Moment In June, during IFFI (2008)

=== Film ===
He broke into film acting in 2003, playing a leading role in The Adventure of Iron Pussy, co-directed by Michael Shaowanasai and Apichatpong Weerasethakul. The film was a parody and an homage to the Thai action films and musicals of the 1970s that starred Mitr Chaibancha and Petchara Chaowarat. In 2004, he starred in the musical-comedy, Bangkok Loco, playing a musician endowed with mystical rock-drumming powers.

In 2006, he portrayed salesman who must undertake a series of 13 degrading and dangerous stunts to win 100 million baht in 13 Beloved (13 เกมสยอง). He won best actor awards for the role, at the Thailand National Film Association Awards, the Starpics Awards and from the Bangkok Critics Assembly.

== Filmography ==
- My Teacher Eats Biscuits (1996)
- The Adventure of Iron Pussy (2004)
- Bangkok Loco (2004)
- 13 Beloved (2006)
- The Happiness of Kati (2009)
- A Moment in June (2009)
- The Holy Man III (2010)
- Antapal (2012)
- Khun Pan (2016)
- Inhuman Kiss: The Last Breath (2023)

== Personal life ==
On August 31, 2003, Clapp married to Melanie Giles, a Hong Kong Briton teacher. The couple have two children together, Finnegan Clapp and Rosie Clapp.
