= Scrubbing =

Scrubbing may refer to:

- Amine scrubbing
- Carbon dioxide scrubbing (disambiguation)
- Data scrubbing
- Memory scrubbing
- Scrubbing (audio)
- Scrubbing Bubbles

== See also ==
- Scrub (disambiguation)
- Scrubber, a group of air pollution control devices
- Scrubbing In, American reality television series
