= Sombat Metanee =

Thai actor and director (1937–2022)

- สมบัติ เมทะนี
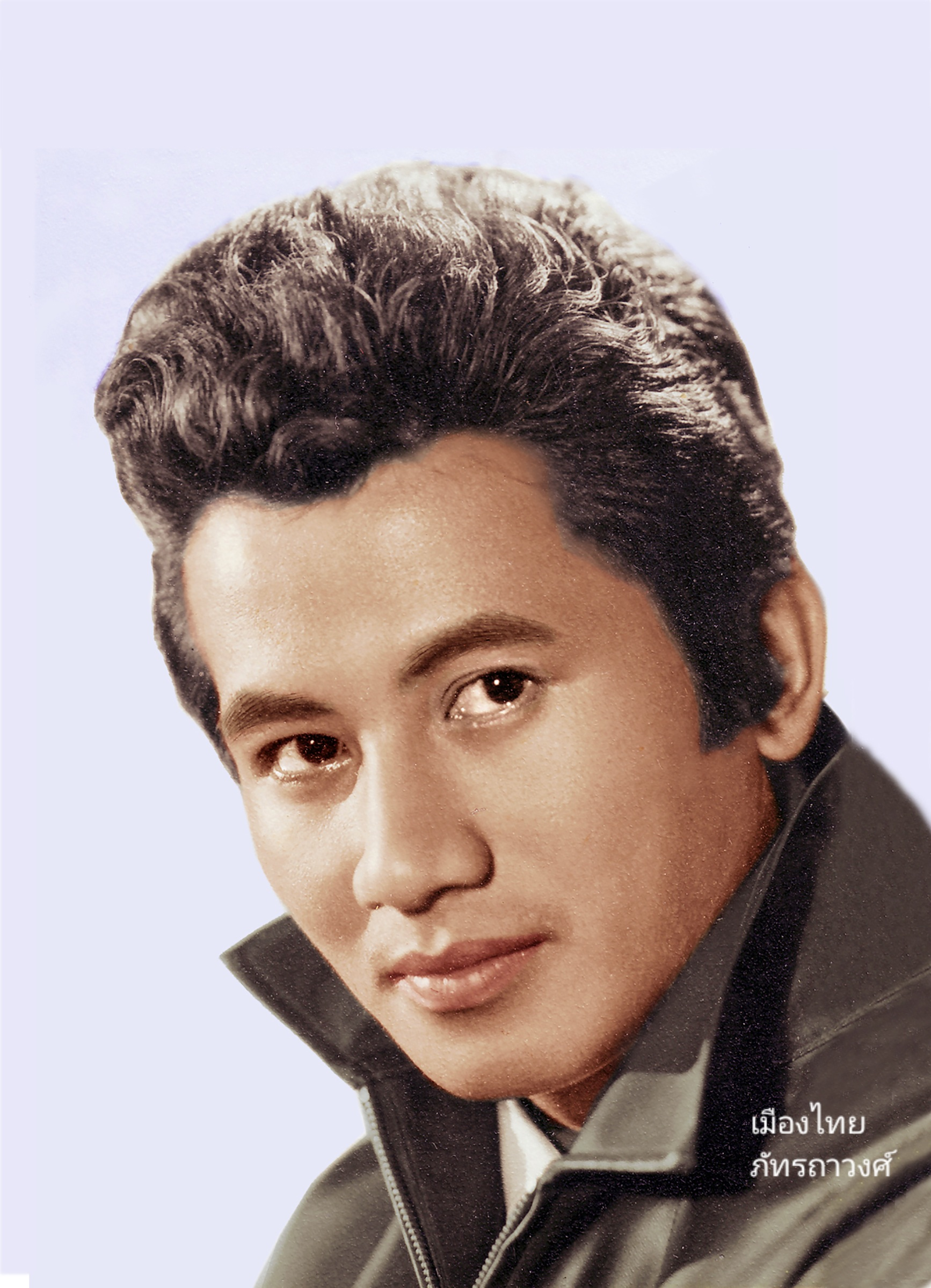
- Sombat in 1964
- Born: 26 June 1937; Ubon Ratchathani, Siam
- Died: 18 August 2022 (aged 85); Bangkok, Thailand
- Occupations: Actor; film director
- Years active: 1960–2017
- Spouse: Kanchana (m. 1959)
- Awards: National Artist (2016)

Sombat Metanee (Thai: สมบัติ เมทะนี, RTGS: Sombat Methani; 26 June 1937 – 18 August 2022) was a Thai actor and film director, who was honored as National Artist in the performing arts branch (movies-television drama) in 2016.

At one time, he held the Guinness World Record for most film appearances (more than 600). By his own count, he was a part of over 2,000 films and television shows. A prolific leading actor in action films, romance, dramas, comedies and musicals at the height of his career in the 1960s and 1970s, he continued to act in Thai films and television series, making frequent appearances on talk shows and in on-screen commercials. Among his later films are Tears of the Black Tiger and The Legend of Suriyothai.

== Early life ==
Sombat was born in Ubon Ratchathani, his mother native land. Seven days after being born, his family moved to Bangkok, settling in the Pathum Wan's Saphan On neighbourhood near the Hua Lamphong railway station, since his father worked at the Royal State Railways of Siam (now the State Railway of Thailand). Therefore, he was considered a Bangkokian implicitly.

After graduating and serving in the army, he was persuaded to enter the show business, while he was looking for work in the Wang Burapha neighbourhood.

== Acting career ==
=== Beginnings ===
Sombat was introduced to the show business in 1960 by Namdee Witta, the leader of a television performance troupe. He starred in the television series Hua Jai Pratana ('Heart's Desires').

His physical attractiveness caught the eye of Noi Kamolwatin, a film director from the Kamolsilpa Pappayon studio. Noi cast Sombat in Roong Petch ('Diamond Rainbow'), which opened at the Empire Theatre in Bangkok and became a huge success. With a fine-sculpted body, brawny face and slicked-back, pomaded hair, Sombat was a popular leading man, with both men and women writing him fan letters. "I never thought of acting, but I was good-looking, smart; I had sex appeal," Sombat said in 2006 in an interview with ThaiDay.

Sombat went on to star in four more Kamolsilpa Pappyon films: Skao Duen in 1962 and Singh Sang Pa, Saming Sao and Nagm-Ngon, all released in 1963. He was then picked up by director Tawee Na Bangchang (better known as Kru Marut) to star in Tawan Lang Lued ('Blood of the Sun'). He also appeared in Kao Mangkorn ('Nine Dragons'), directed by Warun Chatrakul Na Ayutthaya. He was cast by his old talent scout, Namdee Witta, in the action film Singh La Singh ('The Lion vs The Lion'), in which he co-starred with Mitr Chaibancha, who was Thailand's top leading man at the time.

=== Thai leading man ===
Often performing his own stunts, Sombat was an action star very much in the same mold as Mitr Chaibancha. And after Mitr's accidental death in 1970, Sombat became the top Thai leading man, often sharing the screen with Mitr's frequent co-star, Petchara Chaowarat, such as the 1971 musical comedy, Ai Tui ('Mr. Tui'), directed by Dokdin Kanyamarn. He was mainly paired with Aranya Namwong, though, and they replaced Mitr and Petchara as Thailand's top screen couple.

In 1966, Sombat won a "Golden Doll", Thailand's equivalent at the time to the Academy Award, for best actor in Suek Bang Rajan ('The Battle of Bang Rajan'). He received the statuette from King Bhumibol himself.

In 1973, he established Metanee Film, which lasted five years and made 23 films. Among them was the action-comedy Nak Leng Tewada ('The Holy Hoodlum') in 1975.

Other films from the 1970s include the violent prison drama, Narok Tarutao ('The Hell of Tarutao'), directed by Ruj Ronaphop, and the historical epic, Khun Suk (War Lord), directed by Sakka Jarujinda. He played a cowboy in The Reluctant Gunman, a gangster in Louie, romanced Aranya Namwong in Chain of Love, was the Man With a Thousand Masks and controlled robot assassins in Nak Leng Computer ('Gangster Computer'). In another film, 1976's Choompae, he portrayed a brutal anti-hero.

=== Later years ===
With age, Sombat graduated away from the hero roles, playing the role of the heavy. He was the leading villain in the 2000 Thai western, Tears of the Black Tiger, a film that paid homage to the action films he starred in during the 1960s and 1970s.

In addition to Tears of the Black Tiger, he was among an all-star Thai cast in Chatrichalerm Yukol's The Legend of Suriyothai. He had a small comedic role in the 2004 comedy, Bangkok Loco and played a senior police officer in the 2005 horror-comedy, Buppah Rahtree Phase 2: Rahtree Returns.

He's a frequent fixture on Thai television talk shows and in 2006 was appearing in a TV commercial for a brand of DVD player, spoofing his action roles of the 1970s.

In 2004, a restored print of Ai Tui, the 1971 musical comedy he starred in with Petchara Chaowarat was screened at the 2nd World Film Festival of Bangkok. Sombat was honored at the 2006 Bangkok International Film Festival with a Lifetime Achievement Award. The festival's program included a career-spanning retrospective of five of his films: Blood of the Sun from the 1960s, The Holy Hoodlum, Narok Tarutao and War Lord from the 1970s and 2000s (decade) Tears of the Black Tiger.

== Singing career ==
Possessing a natural singing voice, Sombat recorded some 200 songs and released many movie soundtrack records and albums, including 1981's Sombat Kong Yow. He's also penned an autobiography, which was released in 1994.

== Political career ==
In the 2006 Thai general election, Sombat was elected to serve a six-year term in the Senate of Thailand, as a representative from Bangkok. He polled 53,562 votes, though his term was cut short by the 2006 Thailand coup. Of his decision to run, Sombat, who was popularly known by the nickname, Ad, said:

"If Arnold Schwarzenegger won votes to be governor in America, why can’t Uncle Ad do something good for Thailand by being elected Senator?"

In Thailand, candidates for political office are required to have a university degree; so between film shoots, Sombat returned to school to pursue an education. He had a Bachelor of Arts from Rajabhat Walailongkorn University, a Master of Public Administration from Eastern Asia University and was working on a Ph.D. in public administration.

== Personal life and death ==
Sombat married his wife Kanchana in 1959. Previously they had been neighbours and had known each other since childhood. Kanchana also managed his film company. Sombat and Kanchana had five children together, four sons and one daughter. Their oldest son, Siricoup, starred in Chatrichalerm Yukol's 1993 film Salween and is now a race-car driver.

Sombat died on 18 August 2022, at the age of 85. Several actors and actresses expressed their condolences to his family via social media.

== Partial filmography ==
=== As actor ===
- Hua Jai Pratana ('Heart's Desires') (television series) (1960)
- Roong Petch ('Diamond Rainbow') (1961)
- Skao Duen (1962)
- Singh Sang Pa (1963)
- Saming Sao (1963)
- Ngam-Ngon (1963)
- Tawan Lang Lued ('Blood of the Sun') (1963)
- Kao Mangkorn ('Nine Dragons') (1963)
- Singh La Singh ('The Lion vs The Lion') (1963)
- Sugar Is Not Sweet (1964)
- Suek Bang Rajan ('The Battle of Bang Rajan') (1966)
- Ai Tui ('Mr. Tui') (1971)
- Narok Tarutao ('Tarutao, Devil's Island') (1970s)
- Khun Suk ('The Warrior') (1970s)
- Maimee Kamtob Jak Sawan ('No Answer From Heaven') (1973)
- S.T.A.B. (Gold) (1973)
- Krasue Sao ('Ghosts of Guts Eater'), (1973)
- Tipchang (1974)
- Nak Leng Tewada ('The Holy Hoodlum') (1975)
- Choompae (1976)
- Ta Marutayu ('Daredevil') (1976)
- Magnum Killers (1976)
- Louie (1977)
- Yae Nuad Sua ('Tickling the Tiger') (1977)
- Plon America ('The American Job' (1977)
- Nak Pan Din ('The Ungrateful') (1977)
- Mahapai Pan Nar ('Menace with a Thousand Faces') (1978)
- Salakjit (1979)
- Nak Leng Ta Tip ('The Magic-Eyed Gangster') (1980)
- Luk Sao Kamnan ('The Headman’s Daughter' (1981)
- Mae Tang Rom Bai (1982)
- Nak Leng Computer ('The Computer-Age Gangster') (1982)
- Nak Kar Jao Phraya ('The Killer from Chao Phraya' (1982)
- Pleng Rak Gong Loke ('The Greatest Love Song') (1983)
- Nor Sor Luk Wa ('Ms Luk Wa') (1984)
- Kote Kon Jing ('The Real Thing' (1984)
- Koo Sang Koo Som ('Soul Mates') (1987)
- Golden Triangle (1980)
- Petch Payak Karat (1988)
- Médecins des hommes (TV series) (1988)
- Tears of the Black Tiger (2000)
- The Legend of Suriyothai (2002)
- Bangkok Loco (2004)
- Buppah Rahtree Phase 2: Rahtree Returns (2005)
- Fa Mai (2004) (TV Series) as Borommakot
- Chok-Dee (2005)

=== As director ===
- Nai Suan Rak ('Love Garden') (co-directed with Ruj Ronaphop)
- Petchakat Rak ('Killer of Romance') (co-directed with Kor Kaewprasert)
- Maimee Kamtob Jak Sawan ('There's No Answer from Heaven')
- Nuk Leng Tewada ('The Holy Hoodlum') 1975
- Yeh Nuat Sua ('Operation Black Panther') 1977
