= The Cave (2019 Thai film) =

2019 Thai drama film about the Tham Luang cave rescue

- Theatrical release poster
- Directed by: Tom Waller
- Screenplay by: Tom Waller
- Story by: Don Linder; Katrina Grose; Tom Waller
- Produced by: Tom Waller; Allen Liu
- Starring: Jim Warny; Ekawat Niratvorapanya; Tan Xiaolong; James Edward Holley; Nirut Sirijanya; Lawrence de Stefano; Bobby Gerrits; Ross Cane
- Cinematography: Wade Muller
- Edited by: Lee Chatametikool; Asamaporn Samakphan
- Music by: Olivier Lliboutry
- Production companies: De Warrenne Pictures; Salty Pictures; Wild Bunch
- Release dates: 5 October 2019 (Busan); 21 November 2019 (Thailand)
- Running time: 104 minutes
- Country: Thailand
- Languages: Thai; English; Chinese

The Cave (known in Thai as Nang Non, นางนอน) is a 2019 Thai action-drama film about the 2018 Tham Luang cave rescue in Chiang Rai Province, Thailand, written and directed by Tom Waller and co-produced by Waller and Allen Liu. The story is written from the points of view of several individuals involved in the rescue operation, and features cave diver Jim Warny and others as themselves. The film premiered at the 2019 Busan International Film Festival, and was released in Thailand on 21 November. It had a re-edited release in 2022 as Cave Rescue.

== Summary ==
The film covers events of the 2018 cave rescue, focusing in turn on several individuals who contributed to the rescue effort, including water pump manufacturer Nopadol Niyomka, retired Thai Navy SEAL Saman Kunan, and especially, Ireland-based cave diver Jim Warny.

== Cast ==
- Jim Warny as himself, a Belgian diver and electrician based in Ireland
- Ekawat Niratworapanya as Ekkaphon Chanthawong, stateless assistant coach of the "Wild Boar" soccer team
- Tan Xiaolong as himself, a Chinese diver
- James Edward Holley as a U.S. Air Force Major
- Lawrence de Stefano as Chris, British lead diver
- Nirut Sirijanya as Minister of Tourism
- Bobby Gerrits as a U.S. Air Force Staff Sergeant
- Ross Cain as John, a British diver
- Thaweesak Thananan as Saman Gunan, a retired Thai Navy SEAL and diver
- Jumpa Saenprom as Mae Bua Chaicheun, a Thai rice farmer
- Todd Ruiz as himself, an American reporter for Khaosod English
- Erik Brown as himself, a Canadian diver
- Mikko Paasi as himself, a Finnish diver
- Ross W. Clarkson as an Australian doctor
- Michael Shaowanasai as a Thai officer
- Terdporn Manopaiboon as Phra Khuva Boonchum, a Thai Buddhist monk
- Treechada Petcharat as a Thai reporter
- Maggi Apa as an ambulance nurse
- Payao Nimma as Prayut Chan-o-cha, Prime Minister of Thailand
- Joe Cummings as a reporter

== Production ==
The film was produced by Waller's Bangkok-based De Warrenne Pictures. Waller began working on the film soon after the actual events of June–July 2018, and decided on the story after meeting Warny in Ireland. He co-wrote the script with Don Linder and Katrina Grose, focusing on "the unsung heroes—how they first heard what was happening, how they reacted and dropped everything to help." Several individuals involved in the effort portrayed themselves in the film. Most of the filming took place from October 2018 to January 2019, but it was not until February that Waller was allowed to film at the Tham Luang Nang Non cave. The majority of cave scenes were filmed in other caves in Thailand as well as on a set built over a swimming pool. The film was the first about the rescue to be released, while exclusive rights over the boys' stories had been sold to Netflix.

== Release and reception ==
The film premiered at the Busan International Film Festival on 5 October 2019, and was shown at the Vancouver International the BFI London film festivals before its release in Thailand on 21 November. It made 1.1 million baht (US$36,000) on its opening day, and was the second-largest opening that week, following Frozen 2, which earned $9.92 million.

Critical reception to the film was mostly muted. Writing for The Hollywood Reporter, Elizabeth Kerr described the film as "a technically proficient but unemotional rescue drama." Wendy Ide wrote in Screen International, "Like the cave rescue itself, the film isn't the disaster it easily could have been. But it's far from achieving an equivalent triumph." According to the Bangkok Post's Kong Rithdee, the story "feels thin and depthless at times," but ultimately, the film "justifies its existence quite sufficiently."

In Thailand, a minor plot point, where pump manufacturer Nopadol's efforts were initially hampered by bureaucratic requirements, generated heated online discussion. Also, Governor Narongsak Osottanakorn, who led the rescue operation, criticized Waller for not representing the entire operation, as well as for making "jokes that attack the works of Thai civil servants". Waller countered that the Governor should not have criticized without first seeing the film.

A re-edited version of the film, under the title Cave Rescue, received a limited theatrical and digital release by Lionsgate on 5 August 2022.

== See also ==
- The Rescue (2021 film), 2021 documentary film about these events.
- Thirteen Lives, a 2022 Hollywood feature film about the event.
