= Pru (band) =

Thai rock band

- Origin: 2001 in Bangkok, Thailand
- Genres: Indie, Rock, Thai pop
- Years active: 2001–present
- Labels: Bakery Music (2001-2004); LOVEiS (2004-); Sony Music (2001-)
- Members: Krissada Sukosol Clapp; Kamol Sukosol Clapp; Kaninyan Chandrasma; Yodtao Yodying

Pru is a Thai rock band that formed in 2001 in Bangkok. It was the winner of the favorite artist for Thailand at the 2002 MTV Asia Awards.

== Members ==
- Krissada Sukosol Clapp ("Noi", b. December 26, 1970) - Vocals
- Kamol Sukosol Clapp ("Sukie", b. November 1, 1969 - Guitar, keyboard
- Kaninyan Chandrasma ("Tab", b. July 2, 1971) - Drums
- Yodtao Yodying ("Yod", b. November 14, 1978) - Bass

== History ==
Pru was formed in 2001 by brothers Kamol and Krissada Sukosol Clapp, the sons of a Thai mother, Kamala Sukosol, a jazz singer and heiress of the Siam City Hotels and Resorts chain, and an American father, Terrence H. Clapp.

Kamol, better known as Sukie, had founded Bakery Music, an indie music label that fostered an indie scene in Thailand that included the band Modern Dog, which Sukie produced. The label was later sold to Thai entertainment and media company, BEC-TERO, which distributes records through Sony BMG Music Entertainment (Thailand).

The band played concerts at pubs and clubs around Thailand and released its first album, Pru on 3 April 2001. Due to their success, the album was re-released as Pru S.E. (Pru Special Edition) containing extra three new songs in late 2001. Among the songs was "Ruk ter jon job chewit", which was dedicated to the victims of the September 11, 2001 attacks in the United States.

With its lanky, active frontman, Krissada, better known as Noi, the band quickly built a reputation on its live shows. In concerts, he would dance around the stage while singing. In one incident, he jumped up to a giant speaker, fell, and broke his leg in the process. The band still performed in some concerts while Noi's leg was still in a cast however, with him sitting on a chair and his upper body danced in the same routine.

The band staged an upset by winning the favorite artist award for Thailand at the 2002 MTV Asia Awards, beating out perennial favorite artists Bird McIntyre and Tata Young. Accepting the award at the ceremony in Singapore, the band wore Thailand's traditional national clothing.

The quick rise to success left the band members burnt out, however.

"We performed countless concerts and had many gigs in pubs and bars during our first album tour," drummer Tab said in a 2005 interview. "By the end, we all reached a saturation point where playing music wasn’t fun anymore."

"I felt like a prostitute," Sukie said. "We were playing the same old songs and receiving money on the way back. My fire was gone. We really needed a break so that we could start fresh for the second album."

The band took what amounted to a four-year break, with Noi acting in two Thai feature films, The Adventure of Iron Pussy and Bangkok Loco.

They returned in 2005 with their second studio album, the two-disc Zero. Working with Boyd Kosiyabong as lyricist, the album's release was accompanied by a one-day "lightning tour" of Thailand, in which the band used Thai AirAsia flights to jet around the country and perform at clubs and small arenas in Chiang Mai, Udon Thani and Bangkok's Suan Lum Night Bazaar.

The album's promotional blitz culminated with "Pop Life", the band's first full-scale concert on December 3, 2005, at Tossapak Arena in Bangkok.

== Discography ==
- Pru (April 2001)
- Pru Single #01 Romeo & Juliet (July 2001) - Single with 7 versions of the song Romeo & Juliet
- Pru Special Edition (2001)
- Raw Velvet (concert VCD, June 2002)
- BDay - The Album Volume 1 (various artists compilation, celebrating Bakery Music's 10th anniversary, 2004)
- Zero (2005)
- D.S. (Double Single) (2005)

== Famous songs ==
- Thuk sing (Everything), Pru
- Pru, Pru
- Romeo & Juliet, Pru
- Nang fa (Angel), Pru Special Edition
