= Inhuman Kiss: The Last Breath =

2023 Thai film

- Film poster
- Directed by: Paphangkorn Punchantarak
- Screenplay by: Pete Kasidej Sundararjun
- Produced by: Birathon Kasemsri Na Ayudhaya; Nakorn Phopairoj
- Starring: Krissanapoom Pibulsonggram; Chanya McClory; Joe Cummings; Krissada Sukosol Clapp; Paul Spurrier
- Cinematography: Thrinnanon Samrej
- Edited by: Harin Paesongthai; Thunchanok Suthanintr; Joe Harin Paesongthai
- Music by: Rittee Joel Srichanwongse
- Distributed by: Neramitnung Film
- Release date: 30 March 2023 (Thailand)
- Running time: 123 minutes
- Country: Thailand
- Language: Thai

Inhuman Kiss: The Last Breath (Thai: แสงกระสือ 2) is a 2023 Thai film directed by Paphangkorn Punchantarak and released by Neramitnung Film. It is a sequel to Inhuman Kiss.

Friends since childhood, two lonely outcasts longing to be loved meet again. However, they must subdue a bloodthirsty demon residing in one of them.

== Plot ==
After losing a loved one, Noi lives alone with his cheerful daughter Sao. The girl has the Krasue virus from Noi's blood because, in the past, he was in love with Sai. Noi keeps feeding Sao a mysterious herb made into medicine to keep the Krasue hidden inside Sao's body.

Noi and Sao later move into the house arranged by Augustin, the priest. At the church, Sao meets Cloud, the boy at her age, who has the albino syndrome. Cloud has a secret known only by Anan, his semi-brother, and Augustin; he has a power that can heal any living thing from pain. However, Anan tells Cloud not to reveal his secret to anyone for his safety.

The more Sao and Cloud spend time together, the faster their friendship grows. They both reveal what they feel inside each other, especially the loneliness they bear. Until one day, Noi moves into the town. Sao departs from Cloud unavoidably. Before leaving, Sao gives Cloud her favorite mouth organ as a gift. Cloud blows it without knowing that the germ in Sao's saliva enters his body.

Nineteen years later, Sao becomes a beautiful girl in the daytime and becomes a ferocious Krasue at night. Even though Noi tries to stop her from leaving home when she becomes Krasue, he fails. He decides to bring Sao back to the church to be cured by Augustin. It's the first time in many years that Sao meets Cloud. Their relationship resumes.

In the meantime, Pan, who is the Krasue hunter, is hired by Dan, the creature collector, to search for Sao and catch her alive. Sao has no choice but to fight back to protect herself and her loved ones, Noi and Cloud.

== Cast ==
- Krissanapoom Pibulsonggram as Cloud
- Chanya McClory as Sao
- Joe Cummings as Father Augustine
- Krissada Sukosol Clapp as Noi
- Paul Spurrier as Dan

== Release and reception ==
Inhuman Kiss 2 was released in Thailand and Laos on 30 March 2023, with subsequent releases in Cambodia, Singapore, Vietnam, Malaysia and Brunei. Reviewers for news websites The Standard and Beartai, as well as the Daily News and Thairath, complimented the film's production aspects, especially the visual effects, but criticized the screenplay, which they found inconsistent, leading to an unbalanced overall mood.
