= Final Score (disambiguation) =

Final Score may refer to:

== Television ==
- Final Score, a British sports football news television programme that has aired on BBC TV since 1958
- Final Score (U.S. TV program), also known as FSN Final Score, a 2006–2011 American nightly sports news program that aired on Fox Sports Net
- The Final Score, a Canadian sports news program that airs on The Score Television Network

== Film ==
- Final Score (1986 film), a 1986 action film with Christopher Mitchum
- Final Score (2007 film), a 2007 Thai documentary film
- Final Score (2018 film), a 2018 action film starring Dave Bautista and Pierce Brosnan
