= Apichatpong Weerasethakul =

Thai film director (born 1970)

- อภิชาติพงศ์ วีระเศรษฐกุล
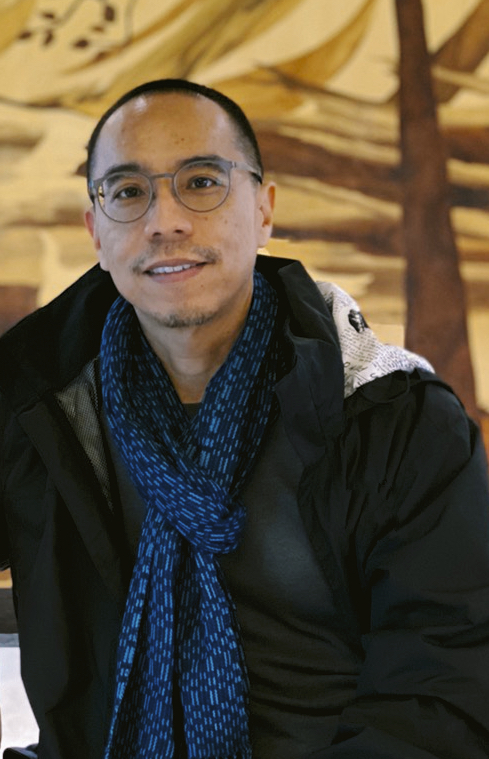
- Apichatpong Weerasethakul in 2019
- Born: 16 July 1970 (age 56); Bangkok, Thailand
- Other names: Joe; Jei (เจ้ย)
- Education: Khon Kaen University; SAIC
- Occupations: Film director; producer; screenwriter; visual artist; professsor
- Years active: 1993–present
- Awards: Palme d'Or
- Website: Official website

Apichatpong Weerasethakul (Note: According to Thai naming customs, this person is addressed by the given name, Apichatpong, instead of the surname, Weerasethakul.) (Thai: อภิชาติพงศ์ วีระเศรษฐกุล; RTGS: Aphichatphong Wirasetthakun; IPA: [ʔà.pʰí.tɕʰâːt.pʰōŋ wīː.rá.sèːt.tʰà.kūn], born 16 July 1970) is a Thai filmmaker, film producer, visual artist and Professor at Tama Art University in Tokyo. Working outside the strict confines of the Thai film studio system, Apichatpong has directed several features and dozens of short films. Friends and fans sometimes refer to him as "Joe" (a nickname that he, like many with similarly long Thai names, has adopted out of convenience).

His feature films include Uncle Boonmee Who Can Recall His Past Lives, winner of the 2010 Cannes Film Festival Palme d'Or; Tropical Malady, which won the Jury Prize at the 2004 Cannes Film Festival; Blissfully Yours, which won the top prize in the Un Certain Regard program at the 2002 Cannes Film Festival; Syndromes and a Century, which premiered at the 63rd Venice International Film Festival and was the first Thai film to be entered in competition there; and Cemetery of Splendour, which premiered in the Un Certain Regard section of the 2015 Cannes Film Festival to critical acclaim. Apichatpong has received numerous additional accolades, including the 2016 Principal Prince Claus Award and the eighth edition of the Artes Mundi Prize. His first English-language film was Memoria, a 2021 international collaboration set in Colombia.

Themes reflected in his films include dreams, nature, sexuality (including his own homosexuality), and Western perceptions of Thailand and Asia, and his films display a preference for unconventional narrative structures and for working with non-actors.

Apichatpong has also widely exhibited in galleries, including FACT in Liverpool, and the BFI Gallery in London, the contemporary art space within BFI Southbank.

== Early life and education ==
Apichatpong was born in Bangkok, Thailand, to a Thai Chinese family. Both his parents had been physicians who worked at a hospital in Khon Kaen, while his grandparents came from Canton. Apichatpong never learned to speak Chinese as his father, who was also a member of the House of Representatives, died when he was young.

Apichatpong grew up in a traditional Buddhist family, exposed to rituals that incorporate animism and Hinduism, spiritual practices retained in the surrealist tones of his works today. Among the filmmaker's early influences are the Dada movement and Joseph Cornell's "boxes".

Apichatpong attended Khon Kaen University and received a bachelor's degree in architecture in 1994. He made his first short film, Bullet, in 1993. He attended the School of the Art Institute of Chicago and received a Master of Fine Arts in filmmaking in 1997.

== Career ==
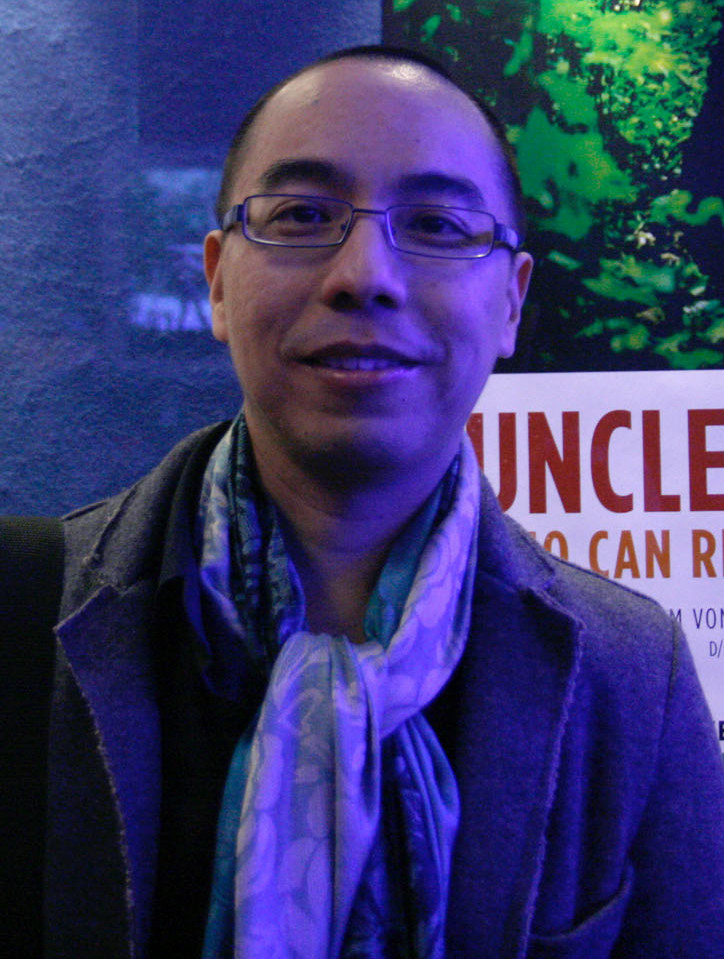
Apichatpong in Vienna in 2010

Apichatpong's feature-length debut, Dokfa nai meuman (Mysterious Object at Noon) is a documentary and was conceptually based upon the "exquisite corpse" game invented by surrealists. He co-founded the production company, Kick the Machine, in 1999, and uses the company as a vehicle for his own works, alongside Thai experimental films and video. The list of other founders includes Gridthiya Gaweewong and Suaraya Weerasethakul and the company co-organised the Bangkok Experimental Film Festival in 1999, 2001, 2005 and 2008.

=== Blissfully Yours, Tropical Malady ===
Apichatpong's 2002 film Sud Sanaeha (Blissfully Yours) was his debut narrative feature film and was awarded the Un Certain Regard prize at the 2002 Cannes Film Festival, though it was censored in his native Thailand. His 2004 Sud Pralad (Tropical Malady) won a Jury Prize from the same festival.

Between Blissfully Yours and Tropical Malady, Apichatpong co-directed The Adventure of Iron Pussy with artist Michael Shaowanasai, who starred as the main character, a transvestite secret agent, while pop singer Krissada Terrence, better known as Noi from the Thai band Pru, portrayed the male lead. The low-budget, digital movie was a spoof of Thai films of the 1960s and 1970s, particularly the musicals and action films of Mitr Chaibancha and Petchara Chaowarat. The Adventure of Iron Pussy was screened at the Berlin Film Festival in 2004. When asked about the film in May 2013, Apichatpong said: "I have had enough of Iron Pussy for now. I was having a good time making it but I was not inspired."

Along with his features, Apichatpong is also known for his short films, videoworks and installations. For the 2005 Jeonju International Film Festival, he was commissioned to contribute to the Three Digital Short Films project, alongside two other Asian directors. His film was called Worldly Desires, while Japanese filmmaker Shinya Tsukamoto made Haze, and Song Il-gon from South Korea created Magician(s).

In 2005, Apichatpong served as the consultant on the Tsunami Digital Short Films, a series of 13 films commissioned by the Thailand Culture Ministry's Office of Contemporary Art and Culture as a memorial tribute to the 2004 Indian Ocean earthquake and the resulting tsunami that struck Thailand. His contribution was the film Ghost of Asia.

The Thai Office of Contemporary Art and Culture also honoured Apichatpong with its 2005 Silpathorn Award for filmmaking. The annual award is given to living contemporary artists in various disciplines.

=== Syndromes and censorship controversy ===
In 2006, Apichatpong released a feature film, Syndromes and a Century, that was commissioned by Peter Sellars for the New Crowned Hope Festival in Vienna to celebrate the 250th anniversary of Mozart's birth. It premiered at the 63rd Venice Film Festival and screened at numerous film events, such as the 2006 Toronto International Film Festival.

The film's Thai release, originally slated for 19 April 2007, was indefinitely delayed after the Thai Censorship Board demanded the removal of four scenes. Apichatpong refused to recut the film and said he would withdraw the film from domestic circulation. He explained his reasons for doing so in an article in the Bangkok Post:

I, as a filmmaker, treat my works as I do my own sons or daughters. I don't care if people are fond of them or despise them, as long as I created them with my best intentions and efforts. If these offspring of mine cannot live in their own country for whatever reason, let them be free. There is no reason to mutilate them in fear of the system. Otherwise there is no reason for one to continue making art.

Two of the "sensitive" scenes involve doctors engaging in "inappropriate" conduct (kissing and drinking liquor) in a hospital; the others depict a Buddhist monk playing a guitar and two monks playing with a remote-control flying saucer. The censors refused to return the print unless the requested cuts were made. In 2007 the film was shown twice in privately arranged screenings at the Alliance française in Bangkok.

The censorship of the film came about as a motion picture ratings system was being considered by the junta-appointed National Legislative Assembly. A replacement for the 1930 film act, the ratings law contained a restrictive ratings structure and retained the government's powers to censor and ban films it deemed would "undermine or disrupt social order and moral decency, or that might impact national security or the pride of the nation". The ratings board would comprise mainly bureaucrats in the Ministry of Culture, as well as members of the Royal Thai Police.

To oppose the draft law, Apichatpong and other directors formed the Free Thai Cinema Movement. Apichatpong was quoted as saying: "We disagree with the right of the state to ban films ... There already are other laws that cover potential wrongdoings by filmmakers." Ladda Tangsupachai, director of the Ministry of Culture's Cultural Surveillance Department, said the ratings law was needed because moviegoers in Thailand are "uneducated". She further explained, "They're not intellectuals, that's why we need ratings ... Nobody goes to see films by Apichatpong. Thai people want to see comedy. We like a laugh."

The filmmakers sought a self-regulation approach, with the founding of an independent body run by film professionals. Apichatpong had written in a commentary earlier in the year:

Free from state influence, this agency would be responsible for monitoring and assigning ratings, and it would bear direct responsibilities towards the audience, who in turn would monitor the performance of the agency. This way, the film industry will be liberated from the state's shackles and begin to have a dialogue with the public.

A protest against the draft ratings law was held outside the Parliament building in Bangkok, at which Apichatpong and fellow Thai directors Wisit Sasanatieng and Pen-Ek Ratanaruang held banners that read: "No Freedom. No Democracy. No Peace" The ratings law, with the "cut-and-ban" categories left intact, was passed on 20 December 2007.

=== "Tomyam Pladib" ===
Apichatpong presented the "Apichatpong On Video Works" session as part of the "Tomyam Pladib" art exhibition that featured both Thai and Japanese artists who produced works regarding the coexistence of traditional and modern cultures. The filmmaker's presentation consisted of three short films: Ghost Of Asia, 0116643225059 and The Anthem. Apichatpong also answered questions from the audience to conclude the presentation.

The first English-language book on Apichatpong was published in March 2009. James Quandt is the editor and author of the analytical career overview that introduces the book. Other contributors include the cultural and political theorist Benedict Anderson, filmmaker Mark Cousins, art curator Karen Newman, critics Tony Rayns and Kong Rithdee, and actress Tilda Swinton.

=== "Primitive", Uncle Boonmee Who Can Recall His Past Lives and Memoria ===
"Primitive", Apichatpong's first solo exhibition—composed of a two-channel video installation, seven single-channel videos, and two giclée prints—was first shown at Haus der Kunst in February 2009. In September 2009, the exhibition was shown in Liverpool, United Kingdom (UK) at FACT (Foundation for Art and Creative Technology). The work was commissioned by Haus der Kunst, of Munich, Germany, with FACT and Animate Projects, and was produced by Illuminations Films, London and Kick the Machine. Curator Karen Newman wrote in the introduction for the exhibition: "His works are also vehicles that take us between different worlds, asking questions about the future and revealing a much bigger story than at first appears." Primitive was shot in the border town, Nabua, where the Mekong River divides Thailand and Laos. In 2011 the New Museum presented the American debut of Primitive

In 2010, Apichatpong's feature film, Uncle Boonmee Who Can Recall His Past Lives, won the Palme d'Or at the Cannes Film Festival. The film was also selected as the Thai entry for the Best Foreign Language Film at the 83rd Academy Awards but it did not make the final shortlist.

In 2012, Apichatpong's film Mekong Hotel was screened in the Special Screenings section at the 2012 Cannes Film Festival.

In March 2013, Apichatpong and fellow Kick The Machine artist Chai Siri received the "Sharjah Biennial Prize" at the 2013 Sharjah Biennial 11 in the United Arab Emirates (UAE), alongside five other artists, including Magdi Mostafa and Fumito Urabe. Apichatpong was also awarded Japan's "Fukuoka Art and Culture Prize" in June, alongside Indian visual artist Nalini Malani, worth JP¥3 million (US$30,540).

In March 2014, it was announced that Apichatpong will feature among 32 directors from four continents, including Vincent Gallo and Gaspar Noé, to direct Short Plays, a soccer-themed omnibus production shot around the world. Apichatpong's short is set in his home town, features 22 shots of its lake, almost the only recognizable feature from his childhood, which are arranged like players in a soccer game.

Apichatpong's latest film, Memoria, a collaboration with Tilda Swinton, produced by Diana Bustamante and shot in Colombia in 2019, had its premiere in the 2021 Cannes Film Festival. It received the Jury Prize (ex aequo), alongside Nadav Lapid's Ahed's Knee. Apichatpong also directed a segment of The Year of the Everlasting Storm, an anthology film.

=== Jenjira's Magnificent Dream ===
It was reported in October 2024 that Weerasethakul is preparing a new feature film set in Sri Lanka. The film is likely to be inspired by Arthur C. Clarke's The Fountains of Paradise (1979) as well as an article written by a Thai woman who went to Sri Lanka on a religious pilgrimage. In September 2025, the film's title, Jenjira's Magnificent Dream, was revealed. Jenjira Pongpas, Connor Jessup, Sakda Kaewbuadee, Tilda Swinton are set to star and filming was scheduled to begin in Sri Lanka in February 2026.

== Personal views ==
In a May 2013 interview for the journal Encounter Thailand, Apichatpong Weerasethakul stated that his films are personal and influenced by his own sexuality, adding: "For me, the word queer means anything’s possible." He also said that he does not see himself as a Thai cultural ambassador.

In December 2023, alongside 50 other filmmakers, Apichatpong signed an open letter published in Libération demanding a ceasefire and an end to the killing of civilians amid the 2023 Israeli invasion of the Gaza Strip, and for a humanitarian corridor into Gaza to be established for humanitarian aid, and the release of hostages.

== Works ==
=== Feature films ===
Year	English Title	Original Title	Notes
2000	Mysterious Object at Noon	ดอกฟ้าในมือมาร	
2002	Blissfully Yours	สุดเสน่หา	Won the Un Certain Regard prize at the 2002 Cannes Film Festival
2003	The Adventure of Iron Pussy	หัวใจทรนง	Co-director (with Michael Shaowanasai)
2004	Tropical Malady	สัตว์ประหลาด	Won the Prix du Jury at the 2004 Cannes Film Festival
2006	Syndromes and a Century	แสงศตวรรษ	Nominated for the Golden Lion at the 63rd Venice International Film Festival
2010	Uncle Boonmee Who Can Recall His Past Lives	ลุงบุญมีระลึกชาติ	Won the Palme d'Or at the 2010 Cannes Film Festival
2012	Mekong Hotel	แม่โขงโฮเต็ล	
2015	Cemetery of Splendour	รักที่ขอนแก่น	Nominated for the Un Certain Regard prize at the 2015 Cannes Film Festival Won Best Film at the 2015 Asia Pacific Screen Awards
2021	Memoria		Won the Jury Prize at the 2021 Cannes Film Festival
2027	Jenjira's Magnificent Dream	น้ำพุแห่งสรวงสวรรค์	Post-production

=== Short films and installations ===
Many of Apichatpong's installations can be considered short films. The following two tables are divided by method of presentation.

==== Short films ====
Year	English Title	Original Title	Notes
1993	Bullet		
1994	0116643225059		
1994	Kitchen and Bedroom		
1994/6	Like the Relentless Fury of the Pounding Waves	Mae ya nang	
1997	100 Years of Thai Cinema		for the Thai Film Foundation
1998	Thirdworld	Goh gayasit	
1998	The Lungara Eating Jell-O		for World Artists for Tibet
1999	Windows		
1999	Malee and the Boy	มาลีและเด็กชาย	
2000	Boys at Noon		
2000	Boys at Noon / Girls at Night		
2001	Secret Love Affair (for Tirana)		
2001	Narratives: Masumi Is a PC Operator / Fumiyo Is a Designer / I Was Sketching / Swan's Blood		for the Intercross Creative Center
2002	Second Love in Hong Kong		Co-directed with Christelle Lheureux
2004	GRAF: Tong / Love Song / Tone		
2004	Worldly Desires		for the Jeonju International Film Festival
2005	Ghost of Asia		Co-director; for the Tsunami Digital Short Films project
2006	Waterfall		for Solar Cinematic Art Gallery/Curtas Vila do Conde International Film Festival
2006	The Anthem		for LUX
2007	Luminous People		segment in The State of the World (O Estado do Mundo)
2007	Because		
2007	Meteorites	Nimit	for Short Films for the King Bhumibol Adulyadej's 80th Birthday
2007	Emerald	มรกต	
2008	Prosperity for 2008		
2008	Vampire	สัตว์วิกาล	for Louis Vuitton
2008	Mobile Men		segment in Stories on Human Rights
2009	A Letter to Uncle Boonmee		companion piece to Uncle Boonmee Who Can Recall His Past Lives
2009	Haiku		
2009	Phantoms of Nabua	ผีนาบัว	for Toronto International Film Festival
2010	Empire		
2011	M Hotel		
2011	Monsoon		segment in 3.11 A Sense of Home Films
2011	For Tomorrow For Tonight		
2012	Ashes		collaboration with Lomo and Mubi
2012	Sakda (Rousseau)		
2013	One Water		
2013	La Punta		segment in Venezia 70 - Future Reloaded
2014	Fireworks (Archives)		
2014	Footprints		broadcast during the 2014 FIFA World Cup
2015	Rolling		
2015	Vapour	หมอกแม่ริม	for Busan International Film Festival
2016	Ablaze		for Singapore International Film Festival
2018	Blue	ตะวันดับ	
2019	2019		for kickthemachine.com
2019	Apichatpong Weerasethakul segment		segment in 30/30 Vision: 3 Decades of Strand Releasing
2020	2020		
2020	October Rumbles	เสียงฟ้าเดือนตุลา	
2021	Night Colonies		Screened in the Special Screenings section at the 2021 Cannes Film Festival
2022	On Blue		collaboration with Rafiq Bhatia and the Cincinnati Symphony Orchestra
2022	Durmiente		

==== Installations ====
Year	English Title(s)	Original Title	Location(s)	Notes
2001	Haunted Houses Project: Thailand		Istanbul Biennial, Turkey	
2002	Golden Ship		Memling Museum, Belgium	
2003	This and Million More Lights		46664	
2004	It Is Possible That Only Your Heart Is Not Enough to Find You a True Love: True Love in Green / True Love in White		Busan Biennale, South Korea	
2006	Faith		FACT, United Kingdom; Liverpool Biennial, United Kingdom	
2006	The Anthem		Frieze Art Fair, United Kingdom	
2007	Unknown Forces		REDCAT, USA	
2007	My Mother's Garden		Musée de l’Orangerie, France	commissioned by Dior
2007/8	The Palace	Pipittan Tee Taipei	National Palace Museum, Taiwan	
2012	The Importance of Telepathy		Documenta, Germany	
2012	Cactus River	โขงแล้งนำ	Walker Art Center, USA	
2013	Dilbar	Sharjah Biennial, UAE		
2016	Invisibility		Saitama Triennale, Japan	
2016	Fever Room		Steirischer Herbst, Austria; Kunstenfestivaldesarts, Belgium	
2017	async - first light		Watari Museum of Contemporary Art, Japan	collaboration with Ryuichi Sakamoto
2018	Constellations		Gwangju Biennale, South Korea	
2018	Fiction		ShanghART Gallery, Singapore	also at Art Basel in 2019
2021	A Minor History, Part 1		100 Ton Son Foundation, Thailand	
2022	A Minor History, Part 2			
2022	For Bruce		Azkuna Zentroa, Spain	
2022	A Conversation with the Sun		Bangkok City Gallery, Thailand	
2022	A Conversation with the Sun (VR)		Aichi Triennale, Japan	
2024	Solarium		SCAI The Bathhouse, Japan	
2024–2027	Ring of Fire		Benesse House Museum, Japan	collaboration with Haegue Yang
2025	A Conversation with the Sun (Afterimage)		Museum of Contemporary Art, Australia	

== Contributions ==
- 2008 Life on Mars, the 2008 Carnegie International
- 2011 "For Tomorrow For Tonight", Irish Museum of Modern Art
- 2013 "Mirage City Cinema", Sharjah Biennal 11
- 2013 "Photophobia", Oslo, Norway
- 2025 Designing of the trophy of the 'Busan Awards' for the competition section for the 30th Busan International Film Festival.
