= 13 Sins =

2014 film by Daniel Stamm

- Theatrical release poster
- Directed by: Daniel Stamm
- Screenplay by: David Birke; Daniel Stamm
- Based on: 13 Beloved by Matthew Chookiat Sakveerakul
- Produced by: Brian Kavanaugh-Jones; Steve Squillante; Kiki Miyake
- Starring: Mark Webber; Rutina Wesley; Devon Graye; Pruitt Taylor Vince; Tom Bower; Ron Perlman
- Cinematography: Zoltan Honti
- Edited by: Shilpa Sahi
- Music by: Michael Wandmacher
- Production companies: Automatik; Little Magic Films; Blumhouse Productions; IM Global; Sahamongkol Film International
- Distributed by: Radius-TWC; Dimension Films
- Release dates: March 7, 2014 (SXSW); April 18, 2014 (United States)
- Running time: 92 minutes
- Country: United States
- Language: English
- Box office: $826,913

13 Sins is a 2014 American horror thriller film co-written and directed by Daniel Stamm. The film is a remake of the 2006 Thai comedy horror film 13 Beloved. Mark Webber stars as Elliot, a meek salesman who accepts a series of increasingly disturbing and criminal challenges. It premiered at the 2014 South by Southwest festival and was released theatrically in the United States on April 18, 2014. This was the final film appearance of George Coe before his death in 2015.

== Plot ==
Elliot Brindle, a meek salesman, loses his job despite his debt and the people who depend on him: Michael, his mentally disabled brother; Shelby, his pregnant fiancée; and Samson, his abusive father. Elliot receives a mysterious phone call that offers him $1,000 to assertively kill a fly that has been harassing him. After Elliot checks his bank account online and sees that he has been credited, he accepts the next challenge: to eat the dead fly, for which he receives $3,622, the outstanding balance on Shelby's credit card. The caller explains that he will be offered a series of thirteen challenges, each of which will result in greater rewards. If he fails to complete any of them, interferes in the game, or reveals the game, he will forfeit all the money, including any he already won.

The next few challenges attract police attention: making a young girl cry, arson, and scamming a homeless person with an ostrich. When the child identifies Elliot in the police station based on wanted posters, Detective Chilcoat takes over the case. Shelby becomes concerned about Elliot's secretive and odd behavior, and he explains that he is planning a surprise. For his sixth challenge, Elliot is forced to take a corpse of a man who committed suicide out for coffee. Given a strict deadline, Elliot panics and brazenly steals a cup of coffee from a table of on-duty police officers. When confronted, Elliot notices that they are drinking alcohol and threatens to file a complaint which forces them to back off. He flees the restaurant, leaving the corpse behind. Impressed by Elliot's boldness and improvisation, the caller tells him he is awarded two completed challenges.

Elliot is then told that he has left behind his library card as evidence. If he wins the game, he will have legal immunity from any crimes he has committed so far. If he loses, he will have no protection. At the same time, Chilcoat follows Vogler, a conspiracy theorist that has been investigating the game. Paranoid, Vogler flees Chilcoat but advises him to kill Elliot at his first opportunity. Chilcoat eventually tracks down Vogler at a bar and discuss that the game's sole purpose is turning players into monstrosities at the promise of millions of dollars. Vogler states his wife once played the game, resulting in her eating their dog. For his next challenge, Elliot receives no instructions and is taken to a rural motel. There, a man identifies himself as a former childhood bully. A nurse arrives and applies a local anesthetic to the man's right arm and gives Elliot an electric surgical saw. For $100,000, the caller tells Elliot to amputate the man's arm. Elliot initially refuses but does so once the man taunts him. After driving the man to the hospital, Elliot beats the man's brother with a chair as revenge for him bullying Elliot and Michael. As a result, he is credited with two more completed challenges.

When the police arrive at the banquet hall where Elliot and Shelby are having their rehearsal dinner, Elliot is surprised to discover that they are interested in Michael, who says he revealed himself to a young woman partially due to his medication being cut off. To give Michael time to escape, he accepts his next challenge. For $500,000, he must destroy the banquet hall while singing The Internationale. Elliot's account is credited for the completed challenge, but disappointed in his reluctance to break social norms, the caller then instructs Elliot to surrender to the police; from whom Elliot learns that another person has been playing the game while committing other acts such as pushing an elder down the stairs and burning down a house of worship. Elliot takes and accidentally wounds a hostage to escape, desperate to complete the game before the other competitor. As he escapes, he's forced to leave behind his cell phone. He takes an old woman hostage when she shows up, convinced that she is involved in his next challenge.

After feigning ignorance, the old woman reveals his next challenge: to pull a braided steel cable across the road. Elliot is horrified when he realizes that a group of bikers have been instructed to speed down the road. Although he disarms the trap in time, the other competitor arms a similar trap down the road, and the cyclists are decapitated. Disgusted and mortified, Elliot quits the game, tossing the phone away before he's told the last challenge and, when he returns home, discovers that Michael is the other competitor. Michael reveals that the final challenge is to kill a family member. Although Elliot originally tries to talk Michael out of killing their father, Elliot becomes homicidal when their father reveals he won the game by killing their mother, which led to a miserable life despite his victory. To prevent his sons from experiencing the horror of losing everything closest to them from winning the game, Samson commits suicide by cutting his own throat.

However, Michael refuses to stop playing the game and attempts to kill Elliot. Elliot kills Michael in self-defense, though he is stabbed multiple times. Elliot is credited for his final challenge, but he forfeits all the money when he interferes with the game by shooting Chilcoat, who had murdered the conspiracy theorist and has now arrived to clean up the crime scene, thus revealing his involvement with the game. Later, Elliot learns that Shelby had been invited to play the game, but had refused and he collapses, laughing happily.

== Cast ==
- Mark Webber as Elliot Brindle
- Devon Graye as Michael Brindle, Elliot's challenged brother
- Tom Bower as Samson Brindle, Elliot and Michael's cold, abusive father.
- Rutina Wesley as Shelby, Elliot's pregnant fiancée
- Ron Perlman as Detective Chilcoat
- George Coe as the Game Voice, a deceptively cheerful voice that gives challenges to the game.
- Pruitt Taylor Vince as Vogler, a conspiracy theorist

== Production ==
The themes of the film were written to reflect drug addiction, and Stamm used a drug addiction specialist to emphasize those parallels in Elliot's character arc. Stamm wanted Elliot to grow assertive and strong, then slowly become addicted to both the game and his new persona, which causes him to not notice the increasingly negative effects on his life. Two endings were shot: a more upbeat ending and a highly nihilistic ending. The alternate ending is available on the Blu-ray release. Jason Blum bought the rights to 13: Game of Death and offered the remake to Stamm, who enjoyed the original film. The studio gave him complete freedom, which Stamm said allowed him to explore his interpretation of the film and tweak tasks that he felt did not work. Perlman did not see the original film, as he did not want it to influence his performance. Several of the tasks are new; Stamm wanted to include enough new content to keep fans of the original film interested in the remake while retaining the original film's most iconic tasks. For the story, Stamm was influenced by Falling Down, which he said invited the audience to identify with a protagonist who becomes increasingly assertive, only to reveal later that he is "a racist and dangerous". Stamm wanted the actors to feel comfortable with each other and their roles, so he had them perform improvisational scenes together. Although initially eager to show off for the sake of impressing Perlman, of whom he is a fan, Stamm eventually backed off and allowed the actors to improvise their lines during filming, too.

== Release ==
13 Sins premiered at the South by Southwest festival on March 7, 2014. The film was released in the United States on video on demand on March 14, 2014, and theatrically on April 18, 2014. It was released on DVD and Blu-ray on June 17, 2014.

== Reception ==
Rotten Tomatoes, a review aggregator, reports that 65% of 43 surveyed critics gave the film a positive review; the average rating was 5.8/10. The site's consensus reads, "13 Sins may be derivative of other horror films that made their moral points with more finesse, but it atones with a grim sense of humor and sleek style." Metacritic rated it 44/100 based on eleven reviews, indicating "mixed or average" reviews.

Variety wrote that it "achieves a modest degree of tension and dark humor before it unravels." Fearnet wrote that the film's greatest weakness was its similarity to earlier films, but that overall "there's more than enough here for a 'psychological horror' fan to get behind." The Austin Chronicle was more positive in their review, in which they said that the movie would have a wide appeal to both genre and mainstream viewers.

Jeannette Catsoulis of The New York Times wrote, "A study of desperation and the evil within, Daniel Stamm's 13 Sins is an empty, efficient thriller that leaves you as cold as most of its characters." Martin Tsai of the Los Angeles Times called it "a Saw knock-off without the torture porn". Staci Layne Wilson of Dread Central rated it 3/5 stars and called it "a fun enough time waster".

Bears Fonté of AMFM Magazine said the film was the best of all the midnighters at SXSW and "provides a nice commentary on materialism and ease at which someone will shed their carefully crafted image when provided with a chance to score some cash." Patrick Cooper of Bloody Disgusting rated it 3/5 stars and wrote that it is "tonally uneven" but "darkly comic".

== See also ==
- Cheap Thrills (film)
