= Bakery Music =

Thai record label

- Parent company: Sony Music Entertainment; BEC-TERO
- Founded: 1994
- Founder: Kamol Sukosol Clapp; Boyd Kosiyabong; Somkiat Ariyachaipanich; Salinee Panyarachun
- Distributor: Sony BEC-TERO Music
- Genre: Various
- Country of origin: Thailand
- Location: Bangkok, Thailand
- Official website: www.bakerymusic.com

Bakery Music is a Thai record label founded in 1994. It pioneered the independent music industry in the 1990s, being the most successful of its time, and inspiring the creation of many other indie labels. The company is now a subsidiary of Sony Music Entertainment Thailand.

== History ==
Bakery Music was founded as an independent music label in 1994 by Somkiat Ariyachaipanich (a.k.a. Zomkiat, Mr. Z), Kamol Sukosol Clapp (a.k.a. Sukie), Boyd Kosiyabong and Salinee Panyarachun. The four had collaborated on Zomkiat's Z-Myx album in early 1994, and by mid-year founded Bakery Music as a record label. The first release by the company by alternative rock band Moderndog featuring an album of the same name became an instant hit, "storming the charts" and selling 500,000 copies. For the next few years, Bakery released multiple successful acts, which include Boyd himself, Joey Boy, Yokee Playboy, Thee Chaiyadej and Pause among others. It received acclaim for its indie productions, and increased in size to include a staff of one hundred people (compared to the original seven). It also published a monthly magazine, Katch.

The label however suffered from the 1997 Asian financial crisis, reporting losses from 1997 onwards, and in 2000 BMG acquired a fifty-one percent majority in the company's shares. Katch was discontinued and the staff was reduced to twenty.

In 2002, following restructuring during the previous year in which BMG assumed most financial management, Bakery returned to profitability, while claiming a five percent share of the national music industry. It released twenty-five albums throughout the year, and began VCD and karaoke production. Eighteen albums were released following year, including Boyd's Million Ways to Love Part 1, which had 350,000 copies sold. Further restructuring saw the companies' offices combined, staff further reduced, and Sukie becoming managing director of BMG Thailand in addition to president of Bakery Music.

In 2004, however, amidst BMG's merger with Sony Music to form Sony BMG that August, internal disagreements resulted in the three remaining original founders leaving the company. (Salinee had already left in 1997.) Both Bakery's tenth anniversary and the parting of its members were marked by the grand-scale 7½-hour B.Day (Bakery Music Independent Day) concert, which was performed on 10 December at Rajamangala Stadium to an audience of 50,000. It was organized by Matching Entertainment, with Wit Pimkarnjanapong and director Apichatpong Weerasethakul working on concept and visual design, and was the largest concert ever held in Thailand, with a total budget of about 100 million baht. "Pass the Love Forward", a single written by Boyd and featuring all Bakery artists from 1994 to 2004, was released to mark the occasion, with part of the proceedings going to Chaiphruek Foundation for Orphans.

Bakery Music is at present owned by Sony Music Entertainment (Thailand) (previously Sony BMG Music Entertainment Thailand), a division of Sony Music Entertainment. Current artists include ToR+ (Saksit Vejsupaporn), Crescendo, Flure and Cake (Uthai Poonyamund), among others.

== List of past and current artists ==
- B5
- Ben Chalatit (Chalatit Tantiwut)
- Bo (Surattanawee Suviporn)
- Boyd Kosiyabong
- Cake (Uthai Poonyamund)
- Crescendo
- Flure
- Groove Riders
- H
- Joey Boy
- Kristin
- Moderndog
- Mr.Sister
- Nadia Suttikulpanich
- Niece
- Nong (Pimluck Kamolpechara)
- Nop Pornchamni
- Oil Shocking Pink
- Ornaree Chularatana
- P.O.P.
- Pause (band)
- Pixyl
- Pru
- Rik Wachirapilan
- Rudklao Amratisha
- Saichon Radomkij
- Sepia
- Soul After Six
- T-Hop
- Tea for Three
- Thee Chaiyadej
- ToR+ (Saksit Vejsupaporn)
- Trai Bhumiratna
- Triumphs Kingdom
- Yokee Playboy
- Mr. Z (Somkiat Ariyachaipanich)

== See also ==
- Sukosol Group
