= Sukosol Group =

Thai hotel chain

- Founded: 1939
- Founder: Kamol Sukosol

Sukusol Group is a hotel business group headed by Kamala Sukosol in Thailand. Kamala is a well-known jazz singer in Thailand. She heads the Siam Hotel in the Royal Quarter of Bangkok, part of the company's Siam Hotel & Resorts holdings.

Siam Hotels and Resorts and other businesses are part of the Kamol Sukosol Co. Ltd. The company dates back to 1939, when Mr. Kamol Sukosol started his trading business with a shipment of 12 radio sets from the United States. Over the following years, Mr Sukosol expanded the business into several other industries, including automotive, finance, insurance, and construction. When the company needed to form independent business units to maintain focus, the Kamol Sukosol Electric Co. Ltd was established in 1973. Henceforth led by his daughter, Kamala Sukosol, the company now focuses on the trading of electric and medical equipment. The real estate holdings of the group include numerous property and office rentals in and around Bangkok.

Kamala's son Sukie assists with Siam Hotel operations and is also the creator of Thailand's largest indie music label: Bakery (music label). Kamala's father sold General Electric radios before branching out in business with manufacturing, real estate and car dealerships.

== Hotel business ==
Siam Hotels & Resorts
- Industry: Hospitality
- Founded: 1970
- Headquarters: Bangkok, Thailand
- Key people: Kamala Sukosol, president Marisa Sukosol Nunbhakdi, executive vice president Daranee Sukosol Clapp, vice president of finance Krissada Sukosol Clapp, consulting designer
- Products: Siam City Hotel, Bangkok; Siam Bayshore Resort & Spa, Pattaya; Siam Bayview Hotel, Pattaya
- Website: www.siamhotels.com

Siam Hotels & Resorts is an independently owned and branded Thai hotel group established in the 1970s. Its properties consist of the Siam City Hotel in Bangkok and the Siam Bayshore Resort & Spa and Siam Bayview Hotel in Pattaya, a seaside city two hours southeast of Bangkok. In all, the group currently operates 4- and five-star luxury properties in Thailand with a hotel-room inventory of over 1,000, overseen by a team of 1,100 local and international management and staff.

== History ==
The origins of the brand date back to 1972 when Kamol Sukosol—entrepreneur, business tycoon and chairman of the Kamol Sukosol Company—acquired a 20-acre (81,000 m^{2}) plot of land in Pattaya and built a resort. The Siam Bayshore Resort opened in 1975 under the leadership of his daughter and managing director, Kamala Sukosol. In 1983, the family acquired another beachfront plot in the centre of Pattaya and built the Siam Bayview Hotel. To complement its Pattaya operations, in 1990 the hotel group opened the Siam City Hotel in downtown Bangkok, adjacent to the Phayathai Skytrain Station.

== Company name ==
What began as Siam Bay Hotels in 1983 has changed over time. In 1990, with the addition (along with the Siam Bayview Hotel and Siam Bayshore Resort & Spa) of the Siam City Hotel in Bangkok, the name "Siam Bay Hotels" was no longer adequate. The group was renamed "Siam City Hotels and Resorts", to represent the three properties. Then again, in 2009, with the looming addition of yet another hotel, The Siam, another name change, to Siam Hotels & Resorts, was made.

== Ownership and management ==
Siam Hotels & Resorts is wholly owned and operated by the Sukosol family: Kamala Sukosol is president, her eldest daughter, Marisa Sukosol Nunbhakdi, is executive vice president; her youngest daughter, Daranee Sukosol Clapp, is vice president of finance, her youngest son, Krissada Sukosol Clapp, is a consulting designer and her eldest son, Kamol Sukosol Clapp, is director of projects. The hotel is managed by a team of Thai and multi-national hotel professionals. Siam Hotels & Resorts currently has 1,100 employees.

== Art and architecture (Siam City Hotel) ==
In the geographical center of Bangkok, the Siam City Hotel is the capital's only five-star hotel in the city's "Palace Quarter", serving important government agencies, the foreign ministry, the United Nations, and major corporations in the vicinity.

Built on an 8-rai (3.2 acres) plot of land, the hotel comprises two main buildings. The ten-storey Ayuthaya Wing was an existing building on the acquired property; it has since been entirely renovated. The 23-storey Siam Wing was designed by the architect, Associate Professor Rangsan Torsuwan. He has designed several major buildings in Thailand, including the head offices of several major banks and Huamark Stadium, Thailand's biggest, with over 60,000 seats.

Respectful of the hotel's location near several major palaces—opposite Suan Pakkad Palace, residence of the grandson of King Rama V, Prince Chumbhot Paribatra; two blocks east of Chitrlada Palace, the king's residence; and two blocks south of King Rama V's country villa, Phayathai Palace—the hotel's lobby and garden pavilion courtyard reflect early 20th-century palace architecture as seen during the reign of King Rama V and King Rama VI. The main lobby is graced by a recreation of a Victorian-style conservatory designed by the American glass maker Stephen Gormley. Similarly, Bent Severin & Associates, an international hospitality design company, echoed a similar concept in the interior decoration of the hotel, whereby Thai-style ambience is combined with early 20th-century Art Nouveau and Art Deco influences.

The Siam City Hotel is also home to an extensive art collection, curated by its owner, Kamala Sukosol. Scattered throughout the hotel are collectibles from Asia and around the globe. Items include Chinese mother-of-pearl inlay cabinets, benjarong ware, hun krabog puppets, prehistoric Ban Chiang pottery, art deco/neo-classical lamps, Burmese wooden sculpture, sao ching cha pottery, Ming Dynasty porcelain, Han Dynasty earthenware, Burmese chests, traditional Thai-style mural painting on canvas, celadon plates and Art Nouveau cabinets.

== See also ==
- Pru (band)
- Krissada Sukosol Clapp
