= Scrub =

Scrub(s) may refer to:

- Scrub, low shrub and grass characteristic of scrubland
- Scrubs (clothing), worn by medical staff
- Scrubs (2001 TV series), an American television series
- Scrubs (2026 TV series), a continuation of the 2001–2010 television series
- Scrubs (occupation), also called "scrub tech," "scrub nurse," or "surgical technologist"
- Wormwood Scrubs, also known as "The Scrubs", an area in west London
- HM Prison Wormwood Scrubs, also known as "The Scrubs", a prison in London
- Scrub baseball, also known as "scrub" or "scrubs", an informal game of baseball without teams
- Patrick Drake and Robin Scorpio, a supercouple featured on the daytime soap opera General Hospital, known to fans as "Scrubs"
- Scrub Island, Anguilla
- Scrub Island (British Virgin Islands)

== See also ==
- Scrubb, a surname
- Scrubb (band), a Thai band
- Deku Scrubs or Deku, a fictional race of creatures in The Legend of Zelda media
- Scrubber (disambiguation)
- Scrubbing (audio), an interaction in which a playhead is dragged across a segment of audio to play it
- Data scrubbing, an error correction technique
