= 13 Beloved =

- Thai theatrical poster
- Thai: 13 เกมสยอง
- Literally: 13 games of horror
- Directed by: Matthew Chookiat Sakveerakul
- Screenplay by: Matthew Chookiat Sakveerakul
- Based on: "13 Quiz Show" by Eakasit Thairaat
- Produced by: Prachya Pinkaew; Sukanya Vongsthapat
- Starring: Krissada Sukosol Clapp; Achita Sikamana; Sarunyoo Wongkrachang
- Cinematography: Chitti Urnorakanku
- Edited by: Matthew Chookiat Sakveerakul
- Music by: Kitti Kuremanee
- Production company: Sahamongkol Film International
- Distributed by: Sahamongkol Film International
- Release date: October 5, 2006
- Running time: 116 minutes 110 minutes (Rated cut)
- Country: Thailand
- Languages: Thai; Indonesian
- Budget: THB 13 million (US$400,000)
- Box office: THB 18.47 million

13 Beloved (Thai: 13 เกมสยอง; RTGS: Sip Sam Kem Sayong; (lit. '13 games of horror') or 13 Game Sayong, also 13: Game of Death) is a 2006 Thai horror comedy film written and directed by Chukiat Sakveerakul and starring Krissada Sukosol Clapp as a man who is led through progressively challenging, degrading, and dangerous stunts by mysterious callers from an underground reality game show, Achita Sikamana and Sarunyoo Wongkrachang appear in supporting role, is adapted from the "13 Quiz Show" short story in the My Mania comic-book series by Eakasit Thairaat. It was the second feature-length film for Chukiat, who previously directed the horror film Pisaj.

The film won several awards in Thailand and from film festivals. Remake rights for the film were purchased by The Weinstein Company.

== Plot ==
A Boy Scout is standing at the crosswalk of a busy intersection in Bangkok and sees an elderly woman carrying some bags, struggling to make her way across the street. The woman drops some of her belongings, and as the lights are about to change, the boy runs out to assist the woman. In the confusion, he drops his mobile phone, and leaves it in the street while he helps the woman to safety. Just as the light changes and traffic starts to rush forward, the boy runs out to retrieve his phone, where he is hit by a bus and killed.

The scene then shifts to protagonist Phuchit Puengnathong (ภูชิต พึ่งนาทอง) (Krissada Sukosol Clapp), a struggling Yamaha Corporation salesman. He arrives at a potential client's school to find that a co-worker from his firm has already made the sale. His girlfriend, Maew, has recently dumped him to become a pop star. He lives alone in a small apartment. The next morning, he finds that his car has been repossessed. He arrives at work and is called into his boss's office, and is forced to resign due to his lack of sales.

He goes out to the stairwell to gather his thoughts and have a cigarette. He then discovers he has no more. He has a big stack of overdue bills from credit companies. However, his mobile phone is still working. His mother calls. She needs some money to pay for his younger brother's schooling. Puchit agrees to send her some money.

Angrily, he crumples his credit-card statements and bills and throws them to the floor. His phone rings again. The caller says Phuchit has a chance to win 10,000 baht. Phuchit is ready to hang up, thinking the call is cruel joke being played on him by his co-workers or friends. But then the caller tells Phuchit his full name, age, employment status and other details that makes Phuchit stay on the line. To win the 10,000 baht, all he has to do is swat a fly which is at that very moment buzzing around him and has been pestering him the whole time he has been sitting in the stairwell. The caller even says there is a rolled up newspaper nearby. Phutchit grabs the paper and swats the fly.

He immediately receives a message that 10,000 baht has been transferred to his bank account. His phone immediately rings again. The caller says Phuchit will win more money if he eats the dead fly. He goes back to his desk, holding the fly while debating whether to eat it. One of his co-workers, a friend, Tong (Achita Sikamana), comes to see him, just as he pops the fly into his mouth. She is stunned and is not sure what to say to him.

Phuchit receives another phone call. The caller explains that if he completes 11 more tasks, he will win 100 million baht. Needing the money, Phuchit reluctantly agrees to play the game. The caller explains that if he quits the game or anyone discovers that he is playing the game, he'll forfeit all his winnings so far.

Phuchit's 13 tasks
1. Kill a fly.
2. Swallow the fly.
3. Make three children cry.
4. Beat up a beggar and take his money.
5. Eat a plate of feces served to him at a Chinese restaurant.
6. Give his mobile phone to a mentally unstable man at a bus stop and then take another mobile phone from a gang of youths on bus No. 6.
7. Retrieve a man's corpse from a well.
8. Beat-up his ex-girlfriend Maew's new boyfriend with a chair.
9. Find an old woman at the hospital and escort her from the building while evading the police.
10. String up a wired clothesline across the highway, which decapitates several motorcyclists.
11. Kill Tong or her dog (Phuchit kills the dog).
12. Slaughter a cow and find a key in the intestines.
13. Kill his father John Adams (hooded man in wheelchair).

For the third stunt, he is told he must make some children cry. This act makes Phuchit recall his childhood, in which his father crushed his toys by stomping on them; Phuchit's father, a farang named John Adams (Philip Wilson), had married his Thai mother (Sukulya Kongkawong). Next, Phuchit must steal coins from a beggar.

For his fifth stunt, Phuchit is told to go to a fine Chinese restaurant. He is brought a covered plate that contains feces and he is told that he must eat it. This makes Phuchit recall when some bullies tried to make him eat dog feces when he was a child.

The stunts grow increasingly degrading, unlawful and deadly. His sixth is to fight with a gang of school-age thugs while riding a public bus in order to get another mobile phone. He must jump down a well and drag up the corpse of a dead man. He has to beat up his ex-girlfriend Maew's new boyfriend with a chair. Next, he must break an elderly woman (the same old woman from the first scene) out of a hospital. The game causes Phuchit to recall his childhood, when he was beaten by his cruel farang father, was taunted by bullies and other bad memories.

Meanwhile, Phuchit's friend Tong is concerned about the strange behavior she witnessed earlier in the office and later in the Chinese restaurant, and putting together clues overheard at the police station, she goes to her computer at work and gets on the internet. A computer expert, she manages to hack into a website for a game called 13. However, unbeknownst to her, she is being watched, and unwittingly, she is made part of the game.

A police detective, Surachai, also becomes involved, and comes close to catching Phuchit. He believes the crime spree is linked to something much larger, and it is hinted he has suspicions about the existence of the game. However, Phuchit evades capture, and a higher-ranking police official orders Surachai to call off the pursuit.

Eventually, Tong's life is put at risk. She discovers the place where the game is being run from, and confronts the game's mastermind, a young boy named Kie, who tells Tong he is powerless to stop the game, saying he is "just a component" in the live, underground reality game involves players and viewers that perhaps number in the thousands.

Phuchit finds himself confronted by his abusive father, John Adams, who is strapped in a wheelchair, wearing a straitjacket and appears to be unconscious. To win the 100 million baht, Phuchit must stab Adams with a butcher knife. Phuchit is unable to do this, recalling that what guided him through his painful childhood and disappointing life was his mother's desire that he never become a bad person like his father. Adams wakes up and stabs Phuchit to death, therefore winning his own game. Tong screams at Kie, and Kie leaves as his minions hold her. Tong later wakes up on a bus bench and is found by Surachai as he continues to investigate.

== Cast ==
- Krissada Sukosol Clapp as Phuchit Puengnathong (Chad in the English dub)
  - Nakarin Triemmerang as Phuchit, age 8
  - Chano Pemberger as Phuchit, age 11
  - Stuart Nombluez as Phuchit, age 14
- Achita Sikamana as Tong
- Sarunyoo Wongkrachang as Surachai (Tay's father in "12 begin" and police in 13 beloved)
- Penpak Sirikul as Kie's Mother (in 12 begin)
- Nathapong Arunnetra as Mik
- Namfon Pakdee as Maew (Mona in the English dub)
- Piyapan Choopetch as Chalerm (Brian in the English dub)
- Philip Wilson as Phuchit's father, John Adams
- Sukulya Kongkawong as Phuchit's mother
- Alexander Rendell as Tay (Main character in 12 begin)
- Poon Tabthong as Old woman
- Suthon Wechkama as Mad man

== Production ==
13 Beloved is adapted from the 13th Quiz Show episode in the My Mania (รวมเรื่องสั้นจิตหลุด) graphic novel (or "pocket book" as it is called in Thailand) series by Eakasit Thairaat originally published as stand alone short story in monthly Thai Comics Magazine Vol.178 (No.5/ March 2003 Vibulkij). before published as collected graphic novel in 2004.

Chukait Sakveerakul discovered a My Mania trade paperback from the local rent comic shop and became impressed immediately with 13th Quiz Show and wanted to adapt it. While waiting for preproduction of romanctic film The Love Of Siam let to Sahamongkol Film contact Eakasit and Worawut Worawittayanon editor of Thai Comics Magazine to buy the movie rights.

Director Matthew Chookiat Sakveerakul said the film is a reflection on what he views as materialism in Thai society.

"There are plenty of movies out there that are only for fun," Chukiat said in an interview. "I am more interested in political and social issues, so my movies address these and human issues as well. All in all, movies do address the state of being human, with themes such as love, and obsessions of one kind or another. But some just scratch the surface. In the original comics it is black comedy that heavily satire on reality multimedia or game shows like The Weakest Link that was popular in Thailand in this period.

Thailand's prime minister at the time, Thaksin Shinawatra, is directly referenced in the film – his photo is on the newspaper that Phuchit uses to swat a fly.

The film covers one day but actually took about seven months to film.

The fifth stunt involved Phuchit eating a plate of feces, which in reality was a mix of durian, syrup and peanuts.

== Prequel and Sequel ==
A short film prequel, 12 Begin, was made as part of the film's pre-release promotional campaign. It was shown in limited screenings at SF Cinema City theaters. A sequel called 14 Beyond has been planned for several years, but has yet to start production. Commuan Studios began producing a manga version of the sequel in the leadup to the planned production, but it no longer appears to be available online.

== Release ==
The film opened in wide release in Thai cinemas on October 5, 2006. It was also screened commercially in Japan and Singapore in June 2007. Its North American premiere was at the 2007 Fantasia Festival in Montreal. It also screened at the 2007 Puchon International Fantastic Film Festival, where it won the European Fantastic Film Festivals Federation Asian Film Award. It also screened at the 2007 Bangkok International Film Festival in the non-competition "Thai Panorama" program. The film has been released on Region 3 DVD in Singapore, with English subtitles. It released theatrically in Hong Kong on January 24, 2008.

=== Box office ===
13 Beloved was number one in Thai cinemas on opening weekend, earning US$266,218 and edging out the previous week's number one film, Rob-B-Hood.

=== Critical reception ===
The film was hailed critically as well, with the Bangkok Post's Kong Rithdee calling it a "smart, ambitious commercial film" with shortcomings that "are the results of risk-taking rather than of incompetence." Maggie Lee, writing for The Hollywood Reporter, called 13 Beloved "one of those accomplished suspense thrillers that mount the tension stage by stage without running out of steam at the end, it is also an unyieldingly cynical exploration of the human heart of darkness with an oedipal climax that makes it a field-day for Freudians."

=== Accolades ===
- Thailand National Film Association Awards
  - Best Actor (Krissada Sukosol Clapp)
  - Special Image Creation (Best Visual Effect)
- Golden Doll Awards
  - Best Cinematography
- Bangkok Critics Assembly
  - Best Actor (Krissada Sukosol Clapp)
  - Best Editing
- Starpics Awards
  - Best Actor (Krissada Sukosol Clapp)
- 2007 Fantasia Festival
  - Public Prize, Gold Fantasia, Best Asian
- Brussels International Festival of Fantastic Film
  - Golden Raven Award

== American remake ==
Remake rights for the film were purchased by The Weinstein Company. The remake was released in 2014 titled 13 Sins.
