= Jenjira's Magnificent Dream =

Upcoming film by Apichatpong Weerasethakul

- Thai: น้ำพุแห่งสรวงสวรรค์
- Directed by: Apichatpong Weerasethakul
- Written by: Apichatpong Weerasethakul
- Produced by: Apichatpong Weerasethakul; Diana Bustamante; Simon Field
- Starring: Jenjira Pongpas; Sakda Kaewbuadee; Tilda Swinton; Connor Jessup; Nimmi Harasgama
- Cinematography: Sayombhu Mukdeeprom
- Edited by: Lee Chatametikool
- Production companies: Kick the Machine; Anna Sanders Films; Arte France Cinéma; Baldr Films; Piano; Metafilms; Burning; Louverture Films; New Story; Sovereign Films; 185 Films; Bord Cadre Films
- Release date: 2027
- Countries: Thailand; France; Colombia; Mexico; United States; United Kingdom; Netherlands; Canada; Switzerland
- Languages: Thai; English

Jenjira's Magnificent Dream (Thai: น้ำพุแห่งสรวงสวรรค์) is an upcoming drama film written and directed by Apichatpong Weerasethakul. It follows Jenjira (Jenjira Pongpas), a Thai widow, who travels to Sigiriya, in Sri Lanka, to scatter her husband’s ashes. It also stars Sakda Kaewbuadee, Tilda Swinton, Connor Jessup, and Nimmi Harasgama in supporting roles.

== Cast ==
- Jenjira Pongpas as Jenjira
- Sakda Kaewbuadee
- Tilda Swinton
- Connor Jessup
- Nimmi Harasgama

== Production ==
=== Development ===
It was reported in October 2024 that Weerasethakul was preparing a new feature film set in Sri Lanka. The film was likely to be inspired by Arthur C. Clarke's The Fountains of Paradise (1979) as well as an article written by a Thai woman who went to Sri Lanka on a religious pilgrimage.

An international co-production, the film is produced by Apichatpong Weerasethakul for Kick the Machine (Thailand) Diana Bustamante for Burning (Colombia), and Simon Field. Co-produced by Anna Sanders Films (France), New Story (France), Louverture Films (United States), Piano (Mexico), Sovereign Films (United Kingdom), 185 Films (Thailand), Bord Cadre Film (Switzerland), Baldr Films (Netherlands).

By late 2025, it was confirmed Scottish actress Tilda Swinton would re-team with Apichatpong, following their acclaimed collaboration in Memoria (2021). The rest of the main cast was also confirmed, including Apichatpong regulars Jenjira Pongpas and Sakda Kaewbuadee, alongside Canadian actor Connor Jessup.

=== Filming ===
Principal photography was expected to take place on location in Sri Lanka, starting in February 2026.

== Release ==
The film is expected to have it's world premiere at the 2027 Cannes Film Festival, where Apichatpong is a regular.
