= H Gallery =

Art gallery in Bangkok, Thailand

Coordinates: 13.722037°N 100.52623°E

H Gallery was an art gallery in Bang Rak District, Bangkok, Thailand. It was located in a beautiful 125-year-old Anglo-Thai mansion.. According to the gallery's Facebook site it has closed the exhibition space on Sathorn road in May 2020.

Established in 2002 by American-born Ernest H. Lee, the two-storey gallery specialises in contemporary art with a mostly Asian focus.

H Gallery began working with the Irish-born art critic and curator Brian Curtin in 2011. Curtin inaugurated H Project Space, on the second floor, as a venue for experimental projects including performance, and he continues to also curate much of the main program. 2012 saw the opening of H Gallery Chiang Mai, in Northern Thailand, with an installation of paintings by the Thai artist Mit Jai-Inn.

The gallery has worked with a variety of local and foreign artists, including Tada Hengsapkul, Michael Lee, Sopheap Pich, Olivier Pin-Fat and Pinaree Sanpitak.

In 2012, the exhibition Radu Die: New works by Michael Shaowanasai, featuring the work of Thai-American artist Michael Shaowanasai, was mounted at the gallery.
