= Scrubb =

Scrubb is a surname of English origin. It may refer to:

- Andre Scrubb (born 1995), American baseball player
- Jay Scrubb (born 2000), American basketball player
- Philip Scrubb (born 1992), Canadian professional basketball player of British descent
- Thomas Scrubb (born 1991), Canadian professional basketball player of British descent
- Eustace Scrubb, fictional character in C. S. Lewis's Chronicles of Narnia

== See also ==
- Ken Scrubbs, pastor
- Scrub (disambiguation)
