= Bangkok Loco =

- The Thai movie poster.
- Directed by: Pornchai Hongrattanaporn
- Written by: Sompope Vejchapipat
- Produced by: Kriangkai Chetchotisak; Surachai Chetchotisak; Ekarat Hirancharoen; Rashane Limtrakul
- Starring: Krissada Terrence; Nountaka Warawanitchanoun
- Cinematography: Ruengwit Ramsoot
- Edited by: Panutat Wisetwong
- Music by: Sansab Company
- Distributed by: RS Film
- Release date: October 7, 2004
- Running time: 98 minutes
- Country: Thailand
- Language: Thai

Bangkok Loco (Thai: ทวารยังหวานอยู่, RTGS: Thawan yang wan yu) is a 2004 Thai comedy-musical-fantasy film directed by Pornchai Hongrattanaporn, written by Sompope Vejchapipat and starring Krissada Terrence. The story involves a gifted young rock drummer named Bay who commits a grisly murder and becomes a fugitive from the law. Trained by a monk in a style of drumming called the Drums of the Gods, which treats drumming as a martial art for the forces of good, he must face his opposite drummer from the dark side. The story is set in the 1970s and in a Forrest Gump fashion, the protagonist Bay is seen having an influence on present-day Thai popular culture. Internationally, the movie has gained a cult following because of its fantastically stylized and colorful production design and pop-culture references. The film was chosen for the "Midnight Madness" program at the 2005 Toronto International Film Festival.

== Plot ==
Bay is a talented young rock drummer in Thailand in the 1970s. One day, he is practicing on his drum set in his apartment and is in a trance, but he suddenly notices that everything is covered in blood and that his drumsticks are actually knives. Apparently, he has killed his landlady, Mrs. Victoria. Panicked, he runs out his door, through the streets and alleys to his friend, Ton, who is also a drummer and is in a band called The PC with Meow and Ooh. Despite Bay's circuitous flight to Ton's apartment, she only lives next door to him.

Ton is a long-time childhood friend of Bay, as the two were classmates at Buddhist temple where they were instructed by an old monk in the Drums of the Gods.

Meanwhile, the police have arrived at Bay's apartment, led by Inspector Black Ears. The inspector has a habit of trying to kick in doors that open to the outside. Whenever the inspector yells "Damn!" (Batsop! in Thai), a man named Sombat appears and leans his head on the inspector's shoulder (sop means to lean on shoulder). The inspector also has a smart dog named Dumbass to sniff for clues.

Through his drumming, Bay is able to convince Meow and Ooh that he is innocent. Had he actually killed Mrs. Victoria, Bay would have broken one of the Buddhist precepts and his Drums of the Gods skills would no longer be effective. So they all go on the run and hide out from the cops.

Bay and The PC make their way to a village fair, where The PC has been booked to play. Meow and Ooh sit around and make Bay do all the work to set up the stage. When he's finished, they plan to call the cops on him anyway. Soon the cops do show up and a chase around the village fair ensues, with the inspector pursuing Bay on the various carnival rides. Just as it looks like Bay will escape, the inspector is given a rifle and proves that he is an expert marksman. Bay, however, manages to catch one of the bullets with his drumsticks, but another finds its mark in Bay's shoulder. Bay ends up getting away and finds himself on a dam overlooking a reservoir. On the dam, he meets a man who is going to commit suicide, but Bay talks him out of it. Bay is then picked up by a passing truck and makes his escape just as the inspector and his men have caught up. The inspector witnesses the drowning of his dog Dumbass and also meets a polite boy in a red shirt (meant to resemble tennis pro Paradorn Srichaphan).

Bay has been picked up by a truck hauling films to the village fair, and so he joins the film company and works as a dubber on the film. His performance is a hit, causing the audience to laugh their heads off. Afterward, Bay gives the man, who looks like Prime Minister Thaksin Shinawatra an idea to start a new political party called Thais Love Thais.

Bay is eventually caught and jailed. However, Ton and The PC are in jail, too. After Bay sings a sad song that makes everyone cry, Meow and Ooh decide to help Bay escape. They are able to rig up an explosion and Bay runs away with Ton. She sees that Bay is under stress and guesses it must be because of the upcoming battle of the Drums of the Gods vs the Devil's Drums. Bay's and Ton's teacher, Professor Tuengpo, faced the dark side drummer Ringo Starr in the last competition 10 years ago. He defeated Ringo but also died in the aftermath of the duel, before he could reveal to Bay and Don the secret of the crucial 10th level of the Drums of the Gods. In order to overcome the forces of evil, Bay or Ton must somehow achieve the elusive 10th level, and neither of them feel they are ready. Thinking perhaps that sex will help them achieve the level, they check into a shabby guesthouse and hole up in a room.

While in the guesthouse, which is very dirty, Bay complains to the owner, Mr. Chuwit, and tells him that the rooms should all have bathtubs so guests can clean up. This apparently gives Chuwit the idea to start a chain of massage parlors, all with bathtubs in the massage rooms.

The police again catch up with Bay who is knocked unconscious. When he comes to, the medical examiner tells him that the body of the person Bay is suspected of killing is not Mrs. Victoria, but the police won't consider the evidence. However, the ME lets Bay leave the room.

Bay finds the drumming duel and sees that it is Ton who will face the new Devil's Drums master, who is named Mr. Davis. Bay then realizes that the secret to the 10th level of drumming was the double-sexed technique, which means his penis was cut off and attached to Ton, giving her the power.

There is a climactic drumming duel in a boxing ring, in which all styles of drumming are explored, and the result is that the Drums of the Gods are victorious.

== Cast ==
- Krissada Terrence as Bay
- Nountaka Warawanitchanoun as Ton
- Nimponth Chaisirikul as Inspector Black Ears
- Nophadal Tavitumnusin as Meow
- Pakapat Bunsomtom as Ooh
- Pranee Keebut as Professor Tuengpo
- Kiradej Ketakinta as Ringo Starr
- Rang Sabian as Mr. Davis
- Sumontha Suanpholaat as Mrs. Victoria
- Sombat Metanee as Sombat

== Cultural references ==
Bangkok Loco references several Western films and cultural icons, including Star Wars, Bruce Lee, Marilyn Monroe and Ringo Starr. It also has many cultural references that are specific to Thailand. These include:

- Prime Minister Thaksin Shinawatra – He is first introduced as a film voice-over actor and then is later seen selling second-hand televisions. While making a call from a phone booth, he is struck by lightning and then gets the idea to start a mobile phone company.
- Chuwit Kamolvisit – The former massage parlor tycoon turned maverick politician is seen getting the idea to open massage parlors from Bay.
- Paradorn Srichaphan – A boy portraying the red-shirted Thai professional tennis star is seen receiving a ball and tennis racket from Inspector Black Ears, and then bowing and giving a polite wai, similar to the ritual Paradorn performs before crowds at matches.
- The Overture – Narongrit Tosa-nga, a well-known piphat musician is seen at the beginning rehearsing on his ranad-ek (Thai xylophone). He portrayed Khun In, a rival musician, in The Overture, which was a hit Thai film in 2004.
- Ornnapa Krissadee – A celebrity transsexual makeup artist, actress and presenter in Thailand, she plays a pivotal role in a guest appearance at the end of the film.
