= Ken Scrubbs =

Ken Scrubbs is a pastor and educational activist who has founded social services programs in Florida for underprivileged youth and federal prisoners. He has been recognized for his achievements both nationally and in Florida.

Scrubbs was born in New Orleans, Louisiana, and graduated from Grambling State University in Grambling, Louisiana. He is known for his model projects in service delivery.

Scrubbs has served as a panelist for the White House Office of Faith-Based and Neighborhood Partnerships, addressing Florida's high-risk youth. He also served as chairman of The State of Florida Drop-Out Prevention Task Force, appointed by Florida Department of Education Commissioner John Wynn. Scrubbs was appointed by Florida governor Charlie Crist as board member to New Florida Disaster Relief Recovery Fund, and as a member of the One Church One Child board.

Scrubbs has also partnered with the school system to provide faith-based mentors to nearly 700 at-risk elementary, middle and high school students. Of these, 150 come to The Genesis Center campus; while 550 students are assisted on school campuses. The youths from troubled neighborhoods near the campus also receive academic support which includes math, reading, history and science, assistance in test-taking and technology.

== Biography ==
Scrubbs is the cultural community relations pastor of First Baptist Church in Leesburg, Florida. Scrubbs is a ministry coordinator in Leesburg. He is also the director of The Micah Project (Mentoring Children), 21st Century Learning Initiative (after school tutoring) and the Lake County Neighborhood Accountability Board and Peer Mediation Programs through the Department of Juvenile Justice. Scrubbs conducts weekly Purpose Driven Life classes at Coleman Federal Correctional Complex.

Scrubbs has been married to Linda Scrubbs for 36 years, and he is the father of Cymonda, April and James.

Scrubbs founded the Genesis Center. The Genesis Center began as an after-school mentoring program, but now serves the under-privileged in the community through mentoring, and tutoring. The Genesis Center also offers GED classes and college scholarships.

== Awards ==
- The Governor's Mentor of the Year. (Best Practice Model) in the state of Florida 2003.
- Distinguished Service Award for the Department of Criminal Justice.
- Received the United States Attorney General Volunteer Award for the Nation's Volunteer of the Year for His work in the Federal Bureau of Prisons system 6/2006
- Awarded the Special Congressional Recognition Award by United States Senator Bill Nelson
- Runner-up for the Florida Department of Education Community Leader of the Year Award
- Selected by the Florida Monthly Magazine as One of Twenty-two most Intriguing Floridians who excels in service to others.
- Appointed By Governor Charlie Crist to the New Florida Disaster Relief Recovery Fund
- Appointed by the Governor Charlie Christ One Church One Child Board
- Appointed Board member Lawton Chiles Leadership Corps "Worst to First"
- Awarded Point of Light Award by the Governor Charlie Crist
