= Carbon dioxide scrubbing =

Carbon dioxide scrubbing may refer to:

- Carbon dioxide scrubber, a device that absorbs carbon dioxide
- Carbon capture and storage, the capture of carbon dioxide from large point sources
- Carbon dioxide removal, the removal of carbon dioxide from ambient air
