= Joe Cummings (travel writer) =

American travel writer

- Born: New Orleans, Louisiana, U.S.
- Education: Guilford College (BA); UC Berkeley (MA); University of Hawaiʻi (MA)
- Occupations: Travel writer, journalist, cultural commentator, actor, composer
- Notable work: Thailand: A Travel Survival Kit (1st Lonely Planet guide)
- Website: www.joecummings.com

Joe Cummings is an American travel writer, journalist, cultural commentator, and occasional actor and composer, considered one of the most influential figures in modern guidebook writing and cultural reporting on Southeast Asia. He is recognized for writing the very first edition of the Lonely Planet Thailand guidebook in 1982 .

Cummings' work has received significant recognition, including being a two-time recipient of the Lowell Thomas Travel Journalism Gold Award for his writing, and Mexico's Pluma de Plata (Silver Quill) for outstanding foreign journalism on Mexico.

== Early life and education ==
Joe Cummings was born in New Orleans, Louisiana. Due to his father's military career, his family traveled extensively, never living in one place for more than three years until he graduated high school. He earned a Bachelor of Arts from Guilford College and holds two Master of Arts degrees: one from the University of California, Berkeley, in Southeast Asian Studies, and another from the University of Hawaii.

== Career ==
=== Lonely Planet and Journalism ===
Cummings is best known for his long association with the Lonely Planet series. After reading nearly every book published in English on Southeast Asia during his MA studies, he sent a proposal to Lonely Planet founder Tony Wheeler, leading to the creation of the first Thailand: A Travel Survival Kit in 1982. This was the first dedicated guidebook to Thailand written in English since a 1928 guide published by the State Railway of Siam.

He continued to write for Lonely Planet for 25 years, contributing to numerous titles including guides to Thailand, Bangkok, Thailand’s Islands & Beaches, Northern Thailand, Laos, and Myanmar. His seminal *Lonely Planet Thailand* guide is a commercial success, with some editions having sold over one million copies.

Beyond guidebooks, Cummings has worked as a journalist and editor. He served as deputy editor for the Bangkok Post's TheMagazine and was an editor-at-large for Talisman Media Group. He has contributed articles and features on travel and culture to a wide range of publications, including CNN Travel, South China Morning Post, BBC Travel, Condé Nast Traveler, Travel + Leisure, Asian Wall Street Journal, The Daily Telegraph, and the Los Angeles Times.

=== Illustrated Reference and Coffee-Table Books ===
Cummings has authored several full-color, illustrated reference books (often referred to as coffeetable books) focusing on the art, architecture, and culture of Southeast Asia. These works represent his focus on in-depth cultural reporting, a direction he has pursued as the guidebook industry became more market-driven.

Notable titles include:

- Buddhist Stupas in Asia: The Shape of Perfection (2001)
- Lanna Renaissance (2006)
- Sacred Tattoos of Thailand: Exploring the Magic, Masters and Mystery of Sak Yan (2012)
- Buddhist Temples of Thailand: A Visual Journey Through Thailand's 42 Most Historic Wats (2019)

He has also contributed to specialized works on Southeast Asian culture and design, such as World Food Thailand, Burmese Art, Design & Architecture, and Muay Thai.

=== Film, Acting, and Composition ===
Cummings has lived in Bangkok for many years and is involved in the local and international film and television production scene, working as a script editor, location scout, composer, and actor.

He has appeared in several Thai and international films, including:

- Father Augustine in Inhuman Kiss: The Last Breath (2023)
- John in Morrison (2023)
- Jim Somerset in The Letting Go

He has also contributed to film scores, including the music for the 2019 Thai film The Cave (also released as Cave Rescue), which focused on the 2018 Tham Luang cave rescue. He also co-composed some of the musical score for the Thai film The Last Executioner (2014) and composed the track "Liquor & Larb" for the Chiang Mai episode of Anthony Bourdain: Parts Unknown.

== Publications ==
=== Notable guidebooks ===
- Cummings, Joe (1982). Thailand: A Travel Survival Kit (1st ed.). South Yarra, Victoria: Lonely Planet. ISBN 090808630X.
- Cummings, Joe (1992). Bangkok: City Guide (1st ed.). Hawthorn, Victoria: Lonely Planet. ISBN 0864421559.
- Cummings, Joe (1994). Laos: A Travel Survival Kit (1st ed.). Hawthorn, Victoria: Lonely Planet. ISBN 0864422032.
- Cummings, Joe (2002). Chiang Mai & Northern Thailand (1st ed.). Footscray, Victoria: Lonely Planet. ISBN 1740590643.

=== Other books ===
- Cummings, Joe (2001). Buddhist Stupas in Asia: The Shape of Perfection. Photography by Bill Wassman. Melbourne, Victoria: Lonely Planet. ISBN 1864501200.
- Cummings, Joe (2006). Lanna Renaissance. Photography by Luca Tettoni. Chiang Mai: Dhara Dhevi Hotel Company. ISBN 0977966003.
- Cummings, Joe (2012). Sacred Tattoos of Thailand: Exploring the Magic, Masters and Mystery of Sak Yan. Photography by Dan White. Singapore: Marshall Cavendish. ISBN 978-9814302548.
- Cummings, Joe (2019). Buddhist Temples of Thailand: A Visual Journey Through Thailand's 42 Most Historic Wats. Photography by Dan White. Singapore: Marshall Cavendish. ISBN 978-9814828802.
