= Pause (band) =

Pause is a Thai rock band that worked with Bakery Music. Pause was composed of a small group of students who are interested in music from the Faculty of Fine and Applied Arts Program in Music in Srinakharinwirot University. Pause had a chance to play in Rock Music Radio and has been interested in Bakery music. ‘Tee – Wang’ is the most popular song that made this band very well known. After Jo Amarin (lead singer) died, Pause disbanded. After that, the other members (Nor, A and Boss) separated and pursued their own music careers. Nor (Norathep Masaeng), the bassist, is now the bassist of the Cressendo Band. A (Polkrit Viriyanuphap), the guitarist, is now the guitarist of the Casino14 Band. Boss (Niruj Daetboon), the drummer, is now also the drummer of the Cressendo Band. However, although time passed by, Pause is still very popular until today.

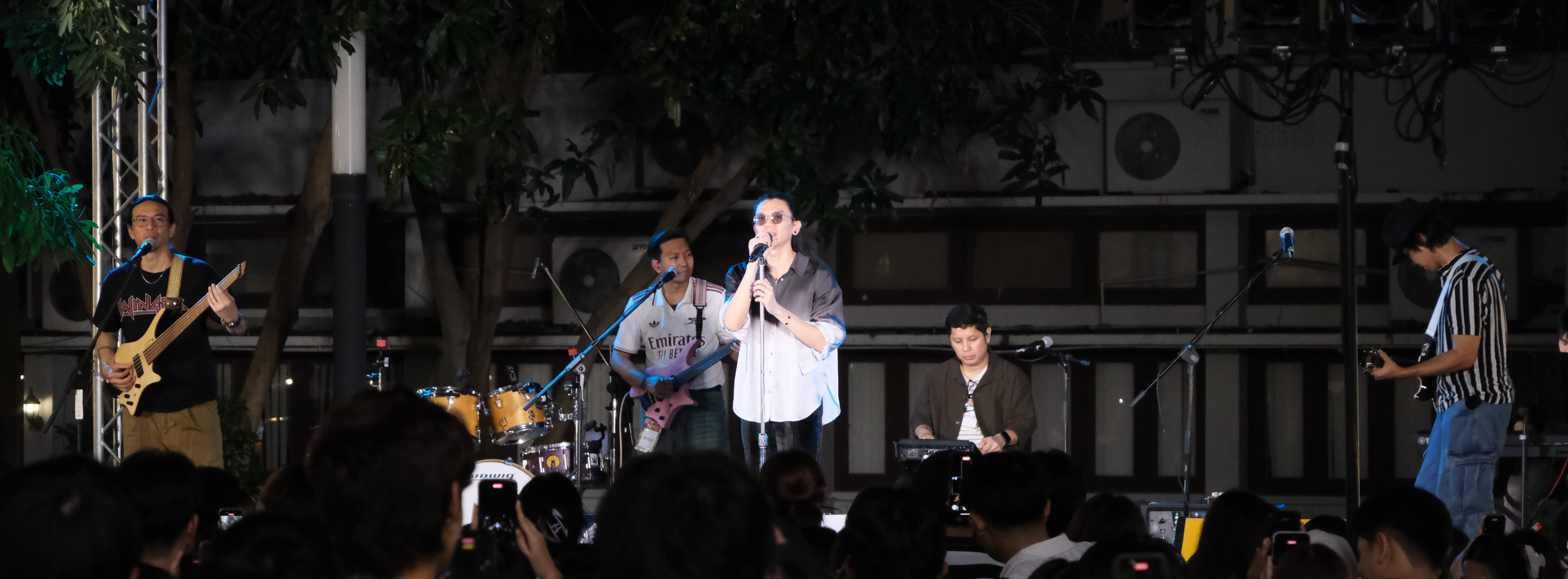
Pause at Thammasat University in 2025

== History ==
=== 1996-1998 Established the band, interested from Bakery music, created album ===
Pause was started by Norathep Masaeng who is the bassist of the band. He needed to find members to make a university music project, so he persuaded Polkrit Viriyanuphap who later became the guitarist, Niruj Daetboon the drummer, and Amarin Leungpaiboon the lead singer who got a Thailand Coke award in 1993.

They first played in the College Artist work and then they named their band ‘Pause’. The meaning of Pause is “stop for a while“. Pause played in Rock Music radio and Bakery Music got interested in them so they signed a contract with Pause. After that, Pause performed their first concert called “Bakery on the Rock“ at the MBK center (a popular shopping mall in the heart of Bangkok). Because of this concert, the name Pause became very popular. After that, they created the first album and played in a very big concert with other very famous bands such as Sillyfools, Ordy and Vichard.

In 1996, Pause created the first album named “Push Me Again“. The meaning of Push Me Again is ‘to be continued’. The Style of this album is pop-rock combined with rap (Hip-hop). The songs in this album are Yue, Mai – ma - laew, Tee - wang, Me – piang – rao, etc.

After two years, they released their second album named “Evo & Nova”. The style of music in this album is softer than the first album. This album did not become very popular except the song named “ Rak ter tung mod kong hua jai.“ It was composed by Boy Kosiyapong. The song “Rak ter tung mod kong hua jai“ was composed for the brother of Jo Amarin that had a car accident.

=== 1998-2002 Third album, Single album by Jo Amarin, Jo Amarin died ===
In 1996, Pause created the third album named “Mild“, which is a Pop album that became very popular. After that, they created the special album named “Rewind 1996-2000". The songs of this album compiled the popular songs from the older albums. In 2000, Jo Amarin created his own single album named “Simply Me“. This album compiled and covered popular old Thai songs that Jo Amarin liked. On 20 February 2002, Jo Amarin committed suicide in the Mansion at Sukhumwit. After that, Pause disbanded and then they created album of Jo Amarin to mourn for his death.

After the band disbanded, the members separated and sought their own music career. Nor - Norathep Masaeng, the bassist, now he is the bassist of the Cressendo band. A - Polkrit Viriyanuphap, the guitarist, now he is the guitarist of the Casino14 band. Boss – Niruj Daetboon, the drummer, now he is also the drummer of the Cressendo band.

On February 20, 2016, in celebration of their 20th year in the music industry, Pause released the single song named “Rak Yu Rob Gai". The singer Jo Amarin’s voice was recorded in 2000.

== Members ==
  - First era
- Amarin Luangboriboon ( Joe ), lead singer.(Dead at 20 Feb 2002)
- Polkrit Viriyanuphap ( A ), guitarist.
- Norathep Masaeng ( Nor ) bassist, leader of band.
- Niruj Daetboon ( Boss ), drummer.
  - Second era
- Prapab Tancharoen ( Fent),lead singer.
- Polkrit Viriyanuphap ( A ), guitarist.
- Norathep Masaeng ( Nor ) bassist.
- Niruj Daetboon ( Boss ), drummer.
