= ThaiDay =

ThaiDay was an English-language newspaper printed in Bangkok in 2005 and 2006. Started by politician Sondhi Limthongkul's Manager Media Group, it consisted of eight broadsheet pages that were inserted in the Thailand edition of the International Herald Tribune. It was printed six days a week, Monday to Saturday. Circulation was in the 5,000-10,000 range.

The paper had its own staff of reporters, photojournalists and editors and also carried translated news from the Thai-language business paper, Phujatkarn Daily.

Competing with the Bangkok Post and The Nation, ThaiDay characterized itself as a moderate choice "in a market traditionally dominated by newspapers that either toe the establishment line or opt for the other extreme of sensationalism."

However, the paper suffered financially after its publisher, Sondhi Limthongkul, took up a campaign to oust Prime Minister Thaksin Shinawatra, and after 15 months of publishing, the paper put out its last issue on August 31, 2006, though a message from Editor-in-Chief Paisal Sricharatchanya said he hoped the paper might be restarted at a later date.

It was the second attempt at an English-language daily for Sondhi and Manager Media Group, which in 1995 launched the Asia Times, a regional daily meant to rival the International Herald Tribune, however that paper folded in the East Asian financial crisis.

== See also ==
- Media of Thailand
- Sondhi Limthongkul
