= Scrubber (disambiguation) =

A scrubber is a pollution control device that removes some particulates and/or gases.

Scrubber or Scrubbers may also refer to:

- Scrubber (brush), a wide brush for cleaning floors and hard surfaces
- Scrubbers, a 1983 film directed by Mai Zetterling
- KSShch, NATO reporting name SS-N-1 Scrubber, a Soviet anti-ship cruise missile with a nuclear warhead

== See also ==
- Carnal Madness, a 1975 exploitation film also titled Scrubbers 2
