= Michael Shaowanasai =

Thai-American artist and actor (born 1964)

- ไมเคิล เชาวนาศัย
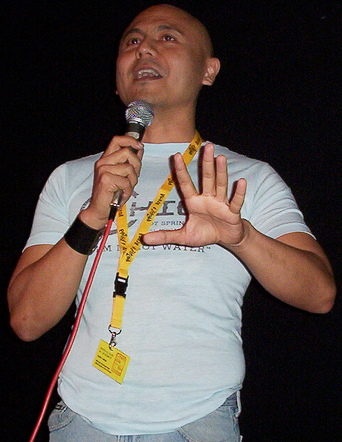
- Michael Shaowanasai presents his film, The Adventure of Iron Pussy, at the Amersterdam Asian Film Festival.
- Born: 1964 (age 61–62); Philadelphia, Pennsylvania
- Education: Chulalongkorn University; San Francisco Art Institute; Art Institute of Chicago
- Occupations: Artist; actor

Michael Shaowanasai (Thai: ไมเคิล เชาวนาศัย, RTGS: Maikhoen Chaowanasai; born 1964) is a Thai-American artist and actor who lives in Bangkok, Thailand. His works includes performance art, photography, video, film and installations. Openly gay, his works are often provocative, such as photographic portrait of himself as a Buddhist monk made up to look like a woman. Active as an artist since 1997, his works have featured in international exhibitions since 1999, and his work is held in major collections.

== Early life and education ==
Shaowanasai was born in 1964 in Philadelphia, Pennsylvania, United States.

He graduated from School of Law at Chulalongkorn University in 1985, earned a Bachelor of Fine Arts degree at San Francisco Art Institute (which included filmmaking) in 1994 and a Master of Fine Arts from the Art Institute of Chicago in 1996.

== Career ==
Shaowanasai is a founding member of Project 304, a contemporary art group based in Bangkok. Their work included the installation and performance Welcome to My Land... Come and Taste the Paradise, and the performance Fresh Young Boys' Semen for Sale.

His solo shows include MS@OAS, a photography installation at Open Art Space in Bangkok, as well as shows at the Fujikawa Gallery in Osaka, Japan, Gallery 4A in Sydney, Australia, and Ottawa Art Gallery, Canada.

Shaowanasai, who is openly gay, ran the inaugural Gay and Lesbian Video Festival in Thailand in 2002. His 2003 photographic artwork, Portrait of a Man in Habits, comprised a photograph of himself dressed as a Buddhist monk with make-up on to look like a woman. This caused an angry response from Buddhists, who tried to stop the photographs from being exhibited, to which he responded by showing the rolled-up photograph.

Among his film and video works is the 2003 feature film, The Adventure of Iron Pussy, which he co-directed with Apichatpong Weerasethakul, a spoof of Thai movie musicals and melodramas of the 1960s and '70s. Shaowanasai portrayed the transvestite character of the title. The film was screened at several festivals, including the Tokyo International Film Festival, the Berlin Film Festival, the Melbourne International Film Festival.

In 2008 he curated the exhibition Lifeboat #2551 as part of the Sydney Biennale projects in Gallery 4A (now 4A Centre for Contemporary Asian Art). The exhibition also included video and film works by artists Wit Pimkanchanapong, Sakarin Krue-on, Tin Tin Cooper, Momokomotion, Manit Sriwanichpoom and others.

Shaowanasai was awarded many residencies between 1997 and 2005, including at the Banff Centre for Arts and Creativity in Canada; New Delhi, India; Paris, France; Columbo, Sri Lanka; and Hokkaido, Japan and at the Elam School of Fine Arts, University of Auckland, New Zealand. He has given guest lectures at a number of other institutions on topics such as fine and applied arts, gender studies, philosophy, religion and anthropology, at his alma maters Chulalongkorn University and the school of The Arts institute of Chicago; Emory University, Atlanta; Rijksakademie, Amsterdam; Monash University, Melbourne, Australia; the Elam School in Auckland; and the University of California, Santa Cruz.

== Acting ==
As an actor, he has a featured role in the 2006 romantic-comedy Metrosexual and portrays a soccer referee in Lucky Loser.

In 2012 he starred in a Philippine-Thai Film entitled Suddenly It's Magic produced by Star Cinema.

== Collections ==
Shaowanasai's work is represented in several institutions, including the Singapore Art Museum.

== Selected exhibitions ==
In 2012, Radu Die: New works by Michael Shaowanasai, was mounted at the H Gallery in Bangkok. His work has also been exhibited in Asia, Europe, Australia, and North America, including the following group exhibitions:

- Venice Biennale (2003 and 2009)
- Asian Traffic, Gallery 4A, Sydney (2006)
- Art Connexions, Goethe Institut, Berlin (2007)
- Act of Faith - On faith and conflict, ecstasy and excess, Noorderlicht, a photographic festival in Groningen, Netherlands (2007 and 2008)
- Lifeboat #2551, Sydney Biennale (2008)
- "The Promenade des Homos" (2020), a photograph featured in the Bangkok Art Biennale 2020

=== Film festivals ===
- Frameline Film Festival (2004)
- Berlin International Film Festival (2004)
- Singapore International Film Festival (2005)
- Melbourne International Film Festival (2005)
- Busan International Film Festival, Busan, South Korea (2010)
