= Modern Dog =

Thai rock band

Modern Dog โมเดิร์นด็อก
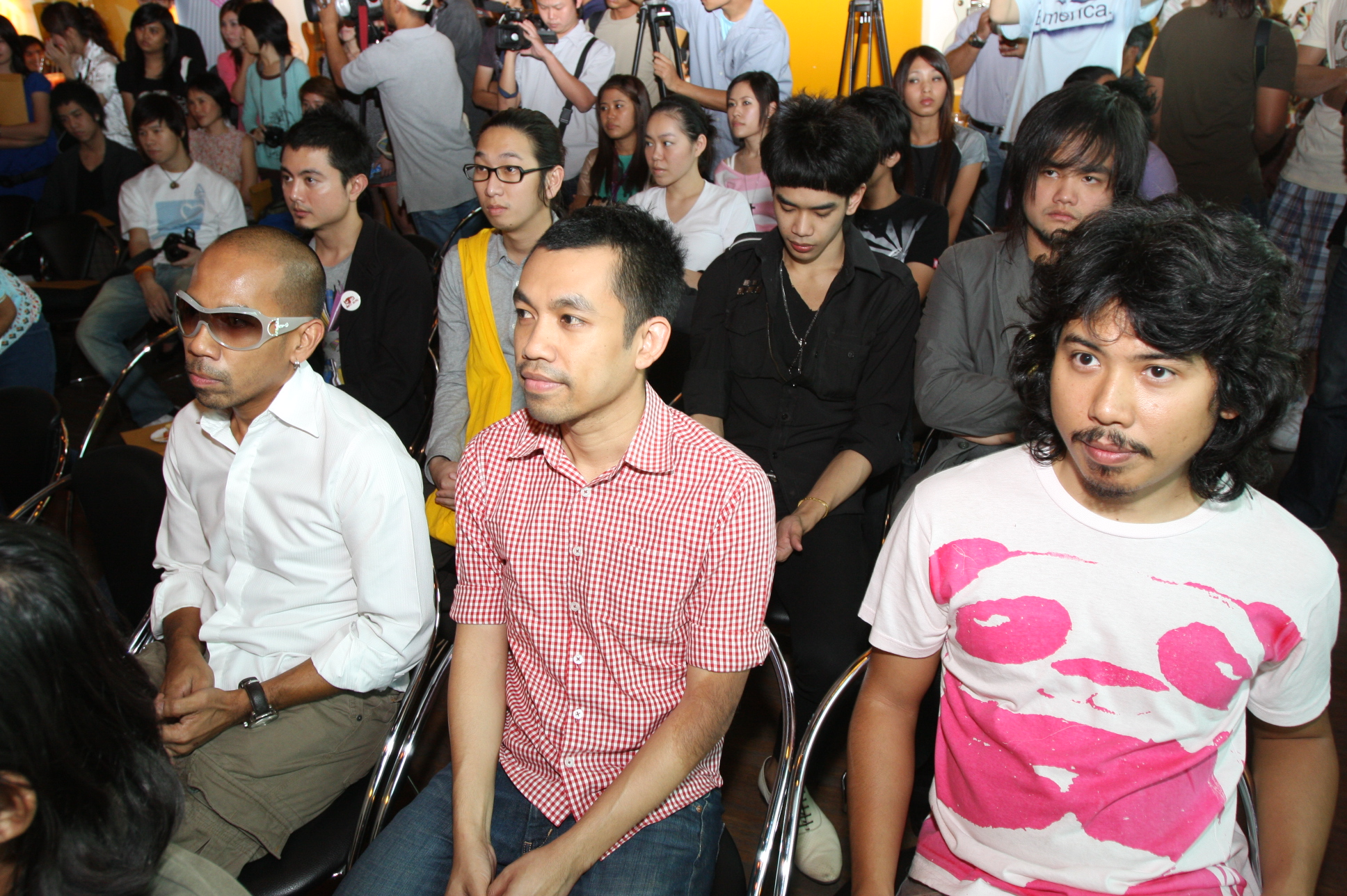
- Modern Dog at MTV News Press Conference in 2007. Left to right: Pawin "Pong" Suwannacheep, Thanachai "Pod" Ujjin, and May-T Noijinda

Background information
- Origin: Bangkok, Thailand
- Genres: Alternative rock
- Years active: 1992–2020 (hiatus)
- Labels: Bakery Music; Sony Music Thailand; Independent as of 2005
- Members: Pawin Suwannacheep; May-T Nojinda; Thanachai Ujjin
- Past members: Somath Bunyaratavech; Sarawut Loetpanyanut
- Website: www.moderndog.biz

Modern Dog (sometimes Moderndog) (Thai: โมเดิร์นด็อก) are a Thai rock band formed in Bangkok, Thailand, in 1992. The founders and original line up of the band consisted of the lead singer and guitarist Thanachai "Pod" Ujjin, the guitarist May-T Noijinda, the drummer Pawin "Pong" Suwannacheep, and the bassist Somath "Bob" Bunyaratavech, though Bunyaratavech left after their second album. Modern Dog's success played a significant role in popularising alternative rock in Thailand, and they are recognised as a major influence on modern rock culture in the country, maintaining a popular following.

With over two million copies sold of their first five studio albums, Modern Dog achieved significant commercial success. They eventually signed to the independent Thai record label Bakery Music, and released their first and self-titled album, Modern Dog, soon after in 1994, establishing themselves as part of the Thai rock scene.

Extending their reach beyond Thailand, Modern Dog played in Tokyo in 2003. In July–August 2006 the band toured the United States, including a show at the Knitting Factory in New York City.

== History ==
=== Formation, Modern Dog, and Café (1992–1997) ===
In 1992, Modern Dog formed while its members, the vocalist Thanachai "Pod" Ujjin, the guitarist May-T Noijinda, the bassist Somath Bunyaratavech, and the drummer Pawin "Pong" Suwannacheep, were students at Chulalongkorn University. In the band's early days they rehearsed at a studio in Siam Square, not far from Chulalongkorn University, after school every Tuesday and Friday, for a total of seven hours a week. According to Noijinda, the group initially came together to participate in the 1992 Coke Music Contest, experimenting with various styles that he described as "art rock music" or "college music". Ujjin later recalled that the Coke Music Contest was "the only chance we had to make loud noise in the Chulalongkorn University Auditorium", at a time when many competing bands favoured jazz-oriented performances. Their performance won that year's award, drawing the attention of Kamol "Suki" Sukosol Clapp, who had recently founded Bakery Music with others, and resulting in a record deal with the label.

Reflecting on the period, Clapp described the Thai music industry at the time as highly standardised, with artists often treated as "presenters" rather than creative individuals. He recalled first seeing Modern Dog rehearsing at Chulalongkorn University, noting their untidy rehearsal space, their playing of Red Hot Chili Peppers songs, and what he described as an unusual level of energy. According to Clapp, this energy distinguished the band from their contemporaries and influenced Bakery Music's approach, which emphasized allowing artists to express their own identities rather than imposing a predefined image on them. (Note: Supported text translated from the original text: สุกี้ : ส่วนใหญ่ในสมัยนั้น วงการเพลงไทยทุกอย่างจะถูกเซ็ทมา คุณจะร้องแบบนี้ คุณจะแต่งตัวแบบนี้ คุณจะพูดแบบนี้ สมัยนั้นเขาไม่ได้เรียกศิลปินว่าศิลปินนะ เขาเรียกศิลปินว่า ‘พรีเซนเตอร์’ (Presenter) นี่เรื่องจริง แล้วพรีเซนเตอร์มันแปลว่าอะไรล่ะ? มันก็ตายคำ อย่างตอนโมเดิร์นด็อก (Moderndog) เข้ามา เขาก็เป็นแบบนั้นของเขา ผมพูดถึงเรื่องนี้อยู่ตลอดเวลาว่าในสมัยก่อน ส่วนใหญ่ค่ายจะเอาศิลปินมาแล้วก็แปะตัวตนให้ แต่ของเราจะตรงกันข้าม เพราะเราเอาศิลปินมาแล้วเราพยายามดึงตัวตนของเขาออกมา… แต่ก็ต้องมีอะไรให้ดึงด้วยนะ (หัวเราะ) สุกี้ : แล้วกับโมเดิร์นด็อกเนี่ย ผมจำได้เลยว่าหนแรกที่ไปดูพวกเขาซ้อมกันที่จุฬาฯ ผมก็เดินเข้าไปห้องซ้อมแล้วมันก็เละตุ้มเป๊ะนิดนึงนะ จำได้ว่าเขาเล่น Red Hot Chili Peppers แต่มันมีเอเนอร์จีที่ไม่เหมือนคนอื่น พลังของพวกเขามันแผ่ออกมา ซึ่งส่วนตัวผมนะ Music is all about energy. ซึ่งโมเดิร์นด็อกมีตรงนี้ที่ตอนนั้นไม่มีใครเหมือน ไม่มีใครใกล้เลยด้วยซ้ำ มันมาอีกจุดหนึ่งเลย มันมาจากข้างใน มันคือสัญชาตญาณจากข้างใน ซึ่งเราเองก็เป็นศิลปิน เราเป็นนักดนตรี ผมคิดว่า direction ของเราก็ต้องมาจากตรงนั้น เราก็ต้องการทำอะไรที่ออกมาจากตัวศิลปินไม่ใช่สร้างอะไรไปใส่ให้เขา)

Modern Dog began working on their first album in 1993 after approaching Clapp, who became the album's producer. At the time, the band's musical influences included Nirvana and the Red Hot Chili Peppers, alongside elements of soul and funk. Clapp explained that the band's demo recordings were made in a raw, live, and unpolished manner, and that, following advice from Somkiat, another founder of Bakery Music, the album was recorded in the same way rather than being polished. (Note: Supported text translated from the original text: สุกี้ : "ไม่ยอมเทคเครดิตนะ เขาเป็นคนแรกที่บอกผมว่าป๊อดจะดัง แล้วก็ ไอว่ายูจำไม่ได้ ตอนนั้นอัด demo ของโมเดิร์นด็อกชุดแรก เราอัดกันดิบมาก เล่นกันสดและดิบ แล้วสมเกียรติก็บอกผมว่าตอนอัดจริงต้องเอาแบบนี้นะ ยูห้ามไป polish นะ ต้องดิบ ๆ แบบนี้ ถ้าสมัยนั้นคงไม่มีใครอัดกันแบบนั้น") Ujjin recalled that the process was a major learning experience for the band. Clapp contributed guitar riffs to most of the songs, while the band and producer worked together by jamming in the studio and jointly developing lyrics and melodies. Ujjin also noted that he had only recently begun writing songs at the time. Before working with Clapp, he completed the lyrics and melody for "Cheewit", which he wrote on his 21st birthday as the band was forming, describing it as a song about a teenager pursuing his dream. However, Ujjin stated that many of Modern Dog's most successful early songs were written by Clapp.

Modern Dog released their debut self-titled album in 1994. The album was unexpectedly successful, producing hits such as "Korn", "Busaba", "Bang Sing", and "Mod Wela". Ujjin recalled that when Clapp asked how many copies the album might sell, he expected only 5,000, but it ultimately sold more than one million copies. Its commercial success helped establish Bakery Music as Thailand's most successful independent label at the time. Ujjin later reflected: "I think the music scene at that time was waiting for an alternative and by accident we were that alternative." The album is also commonly referred to as Soem Sukhaphap because it was displayed on the album's cover.

Modern Dog released their second studio album, Café, in 1997. It marked a shift toward a more experimental sound. According to Untamed Traveler, the band sought to distinguish themselves from the wave of alternative groups that emerged after their debut. Ujjin explained that he had been listening to artists such as Tricky and Portishead and had spent time learning to use electronic instruments in the studio, which contributed to making the album "more moody".

=== Love Me Love My Life (1997–2001) ===
Thomas Schmid of MTV Asia reported that following the band's second album, Modern Dog became less active and Bunyaratavech departed, while Ujjin spent time abroad. Fans expressed concern about a possible breakup. Experiencing writer's block while trying to write lyrics for the third album, Ujjin traveled to New York for three months, where he created daily collages from flyers, magazines, and other items. One of these collage pieces became the third album's cover, featuring printers. Modern Dog released their third studio album, Love Me Love My Life, in August 2001.

Love Me Love My Life marked a shift from the style of Modern Dog's first two albums. Kaona Pongpipat of the Bangkok Post wrote that, whereas the band's earlier releases combined social critique with romantic sentiment, the third album left many fans "at a loss" due to its "wild and abstract experimentation of lyrics and sound". Untamed Traveler similarly described the album as a departure from the basic rock riffs and sentimental lyrics common in the Thai market. According to that publication, about half of the tracks were sung in English, and the arrangements incorporated elements such as electronica, fresh guitar melodies, and uplifting vocals alongside harder rock passages. The overall sound was compared to the Stone Roses, Primal Scream, and Massive Attack.

Band members connected this musical direction to their mindset at the time. Ujjin said that each album reflected the group's collective state of mind, and that increased pressure following earlier success led him to "choose to not make it popular", describing the result as "downsizing ourselves with abstract music". He explained that he intentionally composed songs for the album that were "abstract" and "difficult to understand" to lower outside expectations. Noijinda stated that working on the album felt like returning to their early days and "just messing around for fun".

After the album's release, demand for live performances prompted the group to embark on a concert tour, during which Bunyaratavech rejoined the band so they could perform in their original lineup. Ujjin stated that the tour demonstrated the band's continued musical ability and growth. He told Untamed Traveler that the album sessions involved expanded experimentation with sound, noting that Noijinda had "learnt a lot more about effects" and frequently introduced new ideas, including recording the vocals for one of the album's songs, "Ve Tan", in reverse and playing them back through effects pedals.

=== Ta Sawang (2004–2006) ===
Modern Dog released their fourth studio album, Ta Sawang, in 2004. It marked their first collaboration with a foreign producer, Tony Doogan, and remains their most commercially successful album. Ta Sawang was the final album the band released through their longtime label Bakery Music. With the album completed, the band planned to pursue full independence by self-producing future records and offering the finished material to labels only afterward.

Ujjin described the album's approach as "minimal", relying solely on drums, guitar, and bass, with "no more synthesiser or computer". He explained that mistakes or off-pitch moments in performance were accepted as part of the music's character. According to Phatarawadee Phataranawik of The Nation, this raw and intense three-instrument arrangement shaped the album, which Ujjin likened to a smaller-scale "film". He stated that the lyrics, mostly written by him, were philosophical, reflecting on organic life, Buddhism, and positive thinking. He also characterized the album as "common and minimal" and described it as experimental, emphasizing an aesthetic focused on "conveying its beauty from inside".

=== Ting Nong Noy (2006–2008) ===
In October 2006, Modern Dog unveiled new songs for a forthcoming album during appearances at music festivals in Bangkok. They released their fifth studio album, Ting Nong Noy, in 2008 under their own label Moderndog Company Limited. The Standard described the album as consisting mostly of "slow songs, vocals, electric guitars, and some drums". The publication also noted that the album's cover, featuring an image of stones, remained unexplained, characterizing it as "naughty, straightforward, and Thai". Reflecting on the album, Suwannacheep explained the band's motivation in making music, stating that they did it for personal satisfaction rather than fame. He recalled that after completing Ting Nong Noy, the band listened through the finished album together and focused on enjoying that moment, saying they "didn't care about anybody else", and that this outlook had remained constant for the band.

=== Pod Pong May-T (2016–current) ===
In early 2016, Modern Dog released their sixth studio album Pod Pong May-T. According to Pongpipat, the album was named directly after the band's three members: Thanachai "Pod" Ujjin, Pawin "Pong" Suwannacheep, and May-T Noijinda. On the album cover, the three members are dressed in T-shirts with horizontal stripes. The album includes singles such as "O-Noi-Oog" and "Scala", which Pongpipat describes as reflecting the band's familiar energetic style. Other tracks, including "Thank You, Good Luck", "Remind", and "Today, Last Year", present music and lyrics from the perspective of someone who is relaxed with his stage in life and views the past and present with gratitude and nostalgia. Thanachai stated that the album's "state of mind" centers on sharing, contrasting it with the band's earlier, more "wild, demanding, longing and sentimental" approaches. He noted that reaching their 40s influenced this shift, saying that there was "nothing left to yell about" and that the focus had become understanding themselves and others. He described the band's work as an effort to document different stages of their lives, comparing it to "watching a film about the lives of a group of people".

For this album, Modern Dog reunited with producer Tony Doogan, who had worked on their fourth album Ta Sawang, and recorded at Tarbox Road Studios in upstate New York. Thanachai explained that the band spent three weeks there: ten days recording, ten days mixing, one day resting, and returned home "with a complete album". He also noted that the band typically leaves several years between albums to determine what they want to express and to allow members time to pursue individual interests. Reflecting on the group's longevity, May-T remarked that although the members could "separate and then completely disappear" from one another's lives, they consistently found they could reconnect and work together satisfactorily. Thanachai similarly attributed the band's endurance not only to music but also to personal development and the ability to cope with challenges, noting the mental demands of navigating "anger and disappointments" over the years.

== Legacy ==
Modern Dog's legacy is marked by their transformative role in the Thai music scene, particularly in the alternative rock genre. As pioneers, they helped popularise modern rock sounds in Thailand during the 1990s, paving the way for future generations of musicians. Their influence extends beyond their own success, as they are often credited as the "fathers of Thai alternative rock." The Standard wrote that since their debut album, "the Thai music industry has not been the same anymore" and that "They changed everything that the Thai music industry can change." Thairath called them an "icon of the alternative era of the Thai music industry." Chayanit Itthipongmaetee of Khaosod wrote that "they pioneered electronic sound and paved the way for a generation of rock stars" and "remain timeworn favorites of '90s kids." The Nation called them a "pioneering alternative rock band" that made "innovative music" and had an "influential role in the Thai rock scene."

== Band members ==
=== Current members ===
- Thanachai "Pod" Ujjin (Thai: ธนชัย อุชชิน; RTGS: Thanachai Utchin) – Vocals, rhythm guitar (1992–present)
- May-T Noijinda (Thai: เมธี น้อยจินดา; RTGS: Methi Noichinda) – Guitar (1992–present)
- Pawin "Pong" Suwannacheep (Thai: ปวิณ สุวรรณชีพ; RTGS: Pawin Suwannacheep) – Drums (1992–present)

=== Former members ===
- Somath Bunyaratavech (Thai: สมอัตถ์ บุณยะรัตเวช; RTGS: Som-at Bunyarattawet) – Bass guitar (1992–1997; touring 2001)
- Sarawut Loetpanyanut (Thai: สราวุธ เลิศปัญญานุช) – Keyboards

=== Former touring members ===
- Notapol Srichomkwan (Thai: ณฐพล ศรีจอมขวัญ) – Bass guitar (2008)

== Discography ==
=== Studio albums ===
List of studio albums, with selected details
Title	Album details	Sales
Thai: โมเดิร์นด็อก (เสริมสุขภาพ) English: Modern Dog (Soem Sukhaphap)	Released: 1994; Labels: Bakery Music; Producer: Kamol "Suki" Sukosol Clapp	1,000,000
Thai: คาเฟ่ English: Café	Released: 1997; Labels: Bakery Music	—
Love Me Love My Life	Released: August 2001; Labels: Bakery Music	—
Thai: แดดส่อง English: Ta Sawang	Released: 2004; Labels: Bakery Music; Producer: Tony Doogan	—
Ting Nong Noy	Released: 2008; Labels: Moderndog Company Limited	—
Pod Pong May-T	Released: 2016; Labels: Self-released; Producer: Tony Doogan	—
