= Deirdre (given name) =

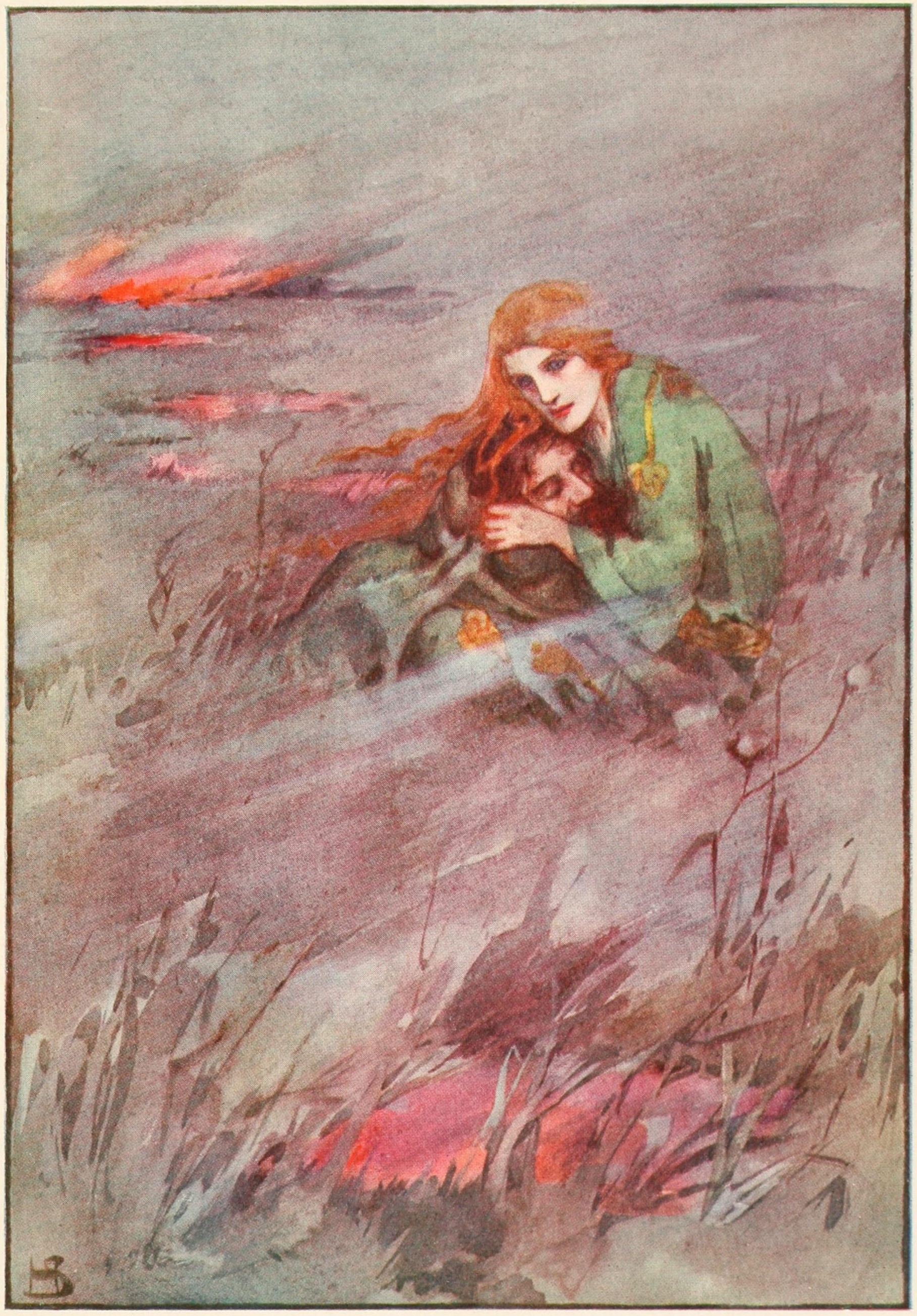
- Deirdre and Naoise, an illustration from A Book of Myths by Helen Stratton.
- Pronunciation: /ˈdɪərdrə/ DEER-drə; Irish: [ˈdʲɛɾˠdʲɾʲə]
- Gender: Female
- Language: Celtic languages

Other names
- Related names: Deidra, Deidre, Deitra, Derdriu

Deirdre is a feminine given name of Celtic origin and of unknown meaning. Deirdre is the name of a tragic heroine of Irish mythology. More attention was drawn to the name during the early 20th century in Ireland and throughout the Anglosphere after W. B. Yeats published his poem Deirdre in 1907 and playwright J.M. Synge published his play Deirdre of the Sorrows in 1910. There are a number of spelling variants and pronunciations of the name in use.

== Usage ==
Deirdre was among the 100 most popular names in use for girls in Ireland between 1964 and 1997, and was a top 10 name for Irish girls between 1966 and 1979. The name was among the 1,000 most popular names in use for girls in the United States between 1944 and 1990. It was at its most popular between 1960 and 1972, when it was among the top 500 names for American girls. It reached peak popularity in 1961, when it was the 333rd most popular name for girls.

== People ==
- Dede Alpert (born 1945), American politician
- Deirdre Bair (1935–2020), American literary scholar and biographer
- Deirdre Barrett, American author and psychologist
- Dede Barry (born 1972), American cycle racer
- Deirdre Sullivan Beeman, American artist
- Deirdre Beddoe (born 1942), British historian
- Deirdre Blomfield-Brown, birth name of Pema Chödrön (born 1936), American Tibetan Buddhist nun
- Deirdre Bolger (born 1938), Irish former politician
- Deirdre Bolton, American journalist
- Deirdre Borlase (1925–2018), British painter and printmaker
- Deirdre Breakenridge (born 1966), American author and businesswoman
- Deirdre Brennan (born 1934), Irish bilingual poet, playwright, and short story writer who writes both in the Irish language and in English
- Deirdre Byrne (born 1982), Irish middle- and long-distance runner
- Deirdre Cartwright (born 1958), British guitarist and composer
- Deirdre Caruana (born 1972), Maltese former sprinter and Olympian
- Deirdre Cash (1924–1963), Australian novelist and torch singer, who wrote under the pseudonym Criena Rohan
- Deirdre Clancy (born 1943), British costume designer
- Deirdre Clune (born 1959), Irish politician
- Deirdre Codd (born 1986), Irish camogie player
- Deirdre Connelly (born 1961), Puerto Rican business executive, particularly with pharmaceutical company GlaxoSmithKline
- Deirdre Costello, Irish former camogie player
- Deirdre Costigan, British politician
- Deirdre Crampton (born 1976), Canadian sailor and Olympian
- Deirdre Curtin (born 1960), Irish legal scholar
- Deirdre M. Daly (born 1959), American attorney who served as the United States Attorney for the District of Connecticut from 2013 to 2017
- Deirdre Davis (born 1963), Scottish actress
- Déirdre de Búrca (born 1963), Irish politician
- Deirdre Donnelly, Irish actress
- Deirdre Duke (born 1992), Irish women's field hockey player
- Deirdre English (born 1948), American former editor of Mother Jones and author
- Deirdre FitzGerald (born 1936), Australian lawyer
- Deirdre Flint, American satirical folk-rock singer-songwriter
- Deirdre Fraser, Australian former world champion lightweight rower
- Deirdre Gallagher (born 1974), Irish retired race walker and Olympian
- Deirdre Gogarty (born 1969), Irish boxing coach and retired boxer
- Deirdre Gribbin (born 1967), Northern Irish composer
- Deirdre Griswold, American communist political activist
- Deirdre Grusovin (born Brereton; born 1938), Australian politician
- Deirdre Hanford, American executive in the electronic design automation industry
- Deirdre Hargey, Irish Sinn Féin politician, Minister for Communities within the Northern Ireland Executive, and former Lord Mayor of Belfast
- Deirdre Hart, New Zealand geographer and academic
- Deirdre Hart-Davis (1909–1998), English socialite, gallery owner and model
- Deirdre Heddon (born 1969), British academic
- Deirdre Heenan, Irish academic
- Deirdre Henty-Creer (1918–2012), Australian painter who spent most of her career in Great Britain
- Deirdre Hine (born 1937), Welsh doctor
- Deirdre Hughes, Irish former camogie player
- Deirdre Hutton (born 1949), British public servant
- Deirdre Hyde (born 1953), British artist
- Deirdre Imus, American artist, author, health advocate and radio personality
- Dee D. Jackson (born 1954), English singer and musician
- Deirdre Jordan (1926–2026), Australian academic and educator
- Deirdre Kelly (born 1971), British TV personality and actress
- Deirdre Kelly (academic), Irish clinician, academic, and author
- Deirdre Kelly (campaigner) (1938–2000), Irish environmental and community activist
- Deirdre Kinahan (born 1968), Irish playwright and theater producer
- Deirdre Eberly Lashgari (1941–2014), American English literature educator, editor, and translator
- Deirdre Le Faye (1933–2020), English writer and literary critic
- Deirdre Lovejoy (born 1962), American actress
- Deirdre Macnab (born 1955), American activist and sustainable agriculture rancher
- Deirdre Madden (born 1960), Irish novelist
- Deirdre McCloskey (born 1942), American economist and philosopher born Donald McCloskey
- Deirdre McKay (born 1972), Northern Irish composer
- Deirdre Milne (née Boye; born 1939), New Zealand retired lawyer and feminist activist
- Deirdre Mullins, 21st-century Irish actress, director, and activist
- Deirdre Murphy (cyclist) (1959–2014), American road cyclist
- Deirdre Murphy (judge) (born 1953), Irish retired judge
- Deirdre O'Brien born c. 1966), American businesswoman
- Deirdre O'Connell (1939–2001), Irish-American actress, singer, and theater director based in Dublin
- Deirdre O'Connell (actress), American actress
- Deirdre O'Connor (1941–2024), Australian lawyer, academic, and former judge of the Federal Court
- Deirdre O'Connor (architect) (1951–1999), Irish architect
- Deirdre O'Donoghue (1948–2001), American disc jockey
- Deirdre O'Kane (born 1968), Irish stand-up comedian and actress
- Deirdre Osborne, Australian-born academic based in the United Kingdom
- Deirdre Purcell (1945–2023), Irish author, actress, and journalist
- Deirdre Quinn (born 1973), American model and actress
- Deirdre Quinn (entrepreneur), American businesswoman
- Deirdre Shannon, stage name of Irish singer Deirdre Gilsenan (born 1974)
- Deirdre Sheehan (born 1957), Irish former swimmer and Olympian
- Deirdre Shoemaker (born 1971), American astrophysicist
- Deirdre Smeltzer (born 1964), American mathematician, mathematics educator, textbook author, and academic administrator
- Deirdre Sullivan, 21st-century Irish children's writer and poet
- Deirdre Sutton, Irish former camogie player
- Deirdre Tarrant (born 1946), New Zealand dancer, dance teacher and choreographer
- Deirdre Walsh, American business executive and former government employee
- Deirdre Wilson (born 1941), British linguist and cognitive scientist
- Deirdre Wolhuter, Canadian-born South African actress

== Fictional characters ==
- Deirdre Barlow, in the British soap opera Coronation Street
- Deirdre Beaubeirdre, in Everything Everywhere All at Once (2022)
- Deirdre Hortense (Dodie) Bishop, in the American animated TV series As Told by Ginger (2000–2004)
- Deirdre (Halloween), from the 1979 novelization Halloween by Curtis Richards

== See also ==
- List of Irish-language given names
