= Labe =

Labe or Labé may refer to:

== Locations ==
- Labe (hamlet), a hamlet in Šumperk District, Czech Republic
- Labé Region, north-central Guinea
  - Labé Prefecture
    - Labé, the capital of Labé Prefecture
- Elbe, a river in Central Europe (Labe in Czech)

== People ==
- Sidney Labe Buckwold (1916–2001), Canadian politician, soldier, and businessman
- Louise Labé (c. 1520–1566), French poet
- Aimé Steven Nsimba Labe or Steven Nsimba (born 1996), French professional footballer

== See also ==
- Molon labe (disambiguation)
