= Claire Khodara =

American recording artist and entrepreneur

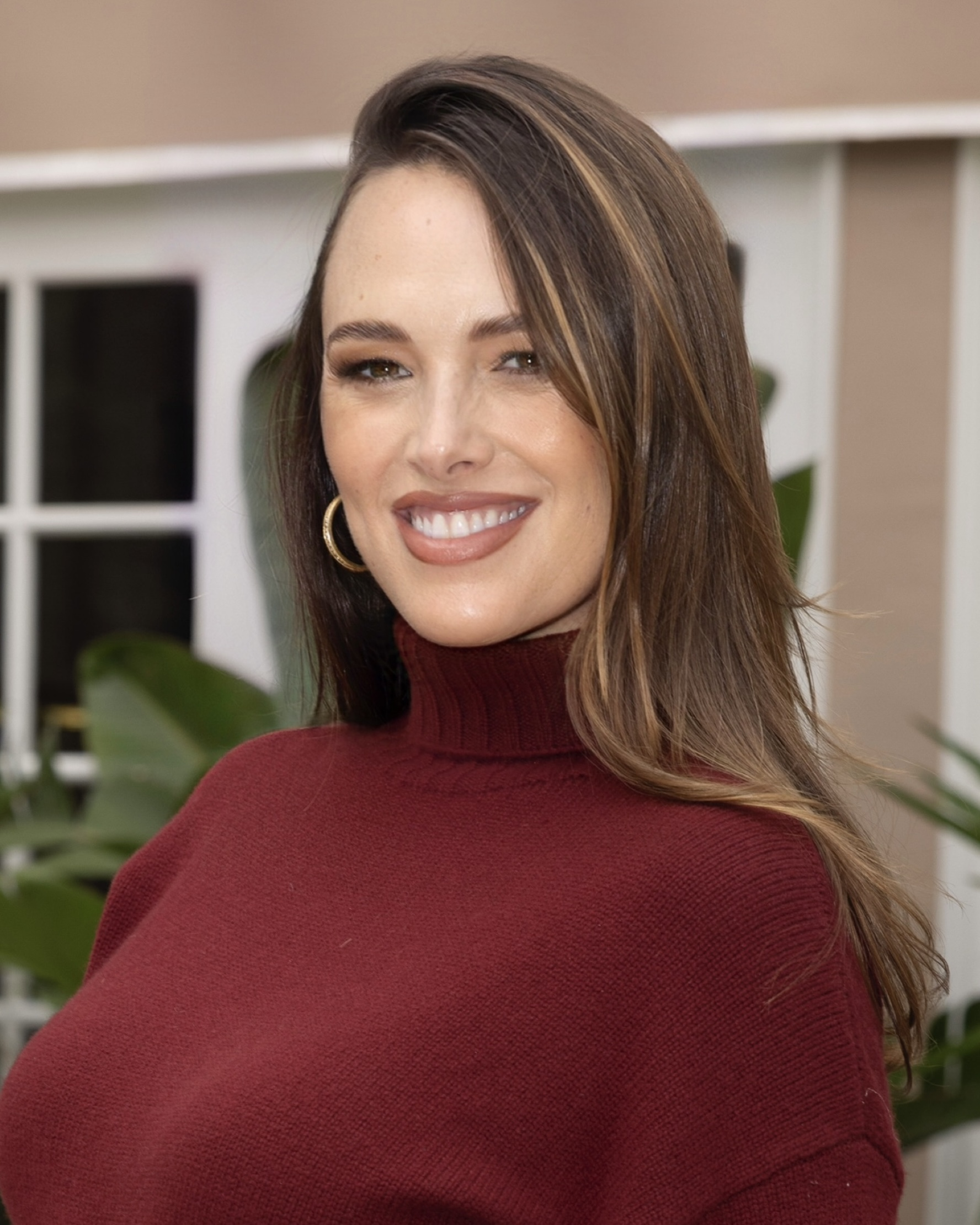
- Born: Claire Fuller; 1985 (age 40–41); Philadelphia, Pennsylvania, U.S.
- Occupations: Recording artist; entrepreneur; podcast host
- Years active: c. 2000–present
- Website: clairekhodara.com

Claire Khodara (née Fuller; born 1985) is an American recording artist, entrepreneur, and podcast host. She is known for her background in classical vocal training, her appearance on American Idol Season 9, and her work in live music performance and entertainment production.

== Early life and education ==
Khodara was born in 1985 in Philadelphia, Pennsylvania. She received classical vocal training at the Accademia Nazionale di Santa Cecilia in Rome. Khodara graduated from Temple University, where she studied in the School of Communications and Theater.

== Career ==
Khodara performed as a classical vocalist and soprano, including performances associated with Vatican events during her early career. In 2010, she competed on the ninth season of American Idol.

In 2012, Khodara founded STARROCK Productions, a talent booking company based in New York City, which has since expanded to Los Angeles.

She also worked as a live performer at venues in the United States and the United Kingdom. She released recorded music, including the album Brand New (2014).

In 2022, she released the album Modern Lullaby, with proceeds supporting autism-related charities.

In 2025, Khodara launched the podcast You Good?.

== Other activities ==
In March 2024, Khodara collaborated with the fashion brand Lafayette 148 on a capsule collection inspired by her late mother, artist Martha Madigan, with a launch event in New York City.

== Discography ==
- Brand New (2014)
- Modern Lullaby (2022)
