= Deidre =

Deidre is a feminine given name and variant of the given name Deirdre, derived from Deirdre, a tragic heroine in Irish mythology. Notable people with the name include:

- Deidre Airey (1926–2002), ceramic artist from New Zealand
- Deidre Anderson (born 1957), Australian academic administrator, sports executive, sports transitions specialist and coach
- Deidré Baartman (born 1991), South African politician
- Deidre Behar (born 1988), American producer
- Deidre Brock (born 1961), Australian-born Scottish politician
- Deidre Brown (born 1970), New Zealand art historian and architectural lecturer
- Deidre Davis Butler (1955–2020), American disability rights activist and federal official
- Deidre Carter, South African politician
- Deidre Catt (born 1940), British tennis player
- Deidre Downs (born 1980), Miss America 2005
- Deidre Freeman (born 1988), American diver
- Deidre Gillard-Rowlings, Canadian actress
- Deidre Goodwin (born 1969), American actress
- Deidre Hall (born 1947), American actress
- Deidre Henderson (born 1974), American politician
- Deidre Holland (born 1966), Dutch porn star
- Deidre Hunter, American astronomer
- Deidre Kitcher, Australian film producer
- Deidré Laurens (born 1995), South African badminton player
- Deidre McCalla, American singer-songwriter
- Deidre Palmer (born 1955/56), Australian counsellor, theologian and social worker
- Deidre Rubenstein (born 1948), Australian television and theatre actress
- Deidre Sanders (born 1945), British agony aunt and writer of the Dear Deidre column in The Sun
- Deidre Watkinson (born 1941), English athlete
- Deidre Willmott, Australian government official

== See also ==
- List of Irish-language given names
- Deirdre (disambiguation)
