= Worlds Apart (Falling Skies) =

- Falling Skies episode
- Episode no.: Season 2 Episode 1
- Directed by: Greg Beeman
- Written by: Mark Verheiden
- Production code: 201
- Original air date: June 17, 2012
- Running time: 42 minutes

Guest appearances
- Jessy Schram as Karen; Brandon Jay McLaren as Jamil; Dylan Authors as Jimmy

Episode chronology
← Previous "Eight Hours"	Next → "Shall We Gather at the River"
- Falling Skies season 2

"Worlds Apart" is the second season premiere episode of the American television drama series Falling Skies and the 11th overall episode of the series. It originally aired on TNT in the United States on June 17, 2012, as a two-hour season premiere with the second episode of the season. Written by the first season showrunner Mark Verheiden and directed by Greg Beeman, "Worlds Apart" was the first original Falling Skies episode in 10 months.

Remi Aubuchon was hired as the showrunner for the second season in May 2011 before the first season premiere. He replaced Verheiden, who is also the co-executive producer. Once Aubuchon entered the writer's room, he began speaking of the cliffhanger left over from the first season finale. He stated that creating the follow-up was a "fun challenge, which propelled a lot of the storytelling for the second season."

Three months have passed since Tom Mason boarded the spacecraft, and the 2nd Mass has been on the move. Assuming their father is dead, Tom's eldest son, Hal, becomes more of a presence in the 2nd Mass, along with Ben, whose hatred of the Skitters grows stronger. After Tom's return, through flashbacks, "Worlds Apart" details his torture by the Overlords and his pilgrimage back to the 2nd Mass.

Reviews for the episode were relatively positive. Many critics saw it as a step-up in quality from the first season and praised the darker approach to storytelling. In the United States, the two-hour season premiere achieved a viewership of 4.46 million. The episode garnered a Nielsen rating of 1.5 in the 18–49 demographic, down from the season finale.

== Plot ==
Three months have passed since Tom Mason (Noah Wyle) boarded the spacecraft, and the 2nd Mass has been on the move. In the opening scene, a small group, part of the 2nd Mass, led by Captain Weaver (Will Patton), attack a group of Skitters and Mechs patrolling the streets. Ben Mason (Connor Jessup), who was captured by the Skitters months earlier, has since grown to despise the extra terrestrials. Weaver orders the group to cease fire and conserve ammo. Ben, however, notices a Skitter still alive. He jumps from the rooftop from which he was firing and slits the Skitter's throat. His brother, Hal (Drew Roy), follows him. They both hear a noise and notice another Skitter. Ben shoots it. However, at that point, Tom Mason was wrestling with it. The bullet goes through the Skitter and wounds Tom.

The group bring Tom back to their camp. Anne Glass (Moon Bloodgood) and Lourdes (Seychelle Gabriel) operate on Tom. While Tom is in surgery, flashbacks appear, filling in the gaps of his 3 month departure. He is apparently tortured by the alien “Overlords” while on the spaceship. Later, the Overlords wish to speak with him. They communicate through Karen (Jessy Schram), who was once part of the 2nd Mass. It tells Tom about a “Neutral Zone”, in which survivors can live in peace – detained in a camp run by The Overlords. Tom quickly realizes that negotiation with their invaders is out of the question, and he immediately refuses. He attacks a nearby Skitter and is knocked unconscious in the process.

Later, Tom is dropped off in a field somewhere. There, he discovers that other people were held captive on the spaceship as well. A Mech kills everyone, except for Tom, presumably to tell others about what he witnessed. He begins a pilgrimage back to Boston. On his way, he finds a girl, Teresa (Laine MacNeil) being mugged. Tom helps her. Teresa’s mother was murdered and Tom and Teresa bury her. They leave together on Teresa’s motorcycle. Later, they hear Mech fire and people. Teresa decides to leave and go to the mountains. Tom stays to find other survivors. There, he finds a Skitter. While attempting to kill it, Tom is shot by his son, Ben.

His story complete, Tom awakens to find Anne by his side. She tells him she knew he’d return for his sons. He tells her that he came back for her too. Tom then reunites with his children before greeting fellow members of the 2nd Mass. They appear happy to see him. Pope (Colin Cunningham), however, appears not so happy to see Tom. He tells Weaver about his suspicions.

== Production ==
Falling Skies was renewed on July 7, 2011, for a second season. TNT announced production had begun on the second season on October 24, 2011. For the second season, Brandon Jay McLaren joined the cast in October as Jamil Dexter, a mechanic. McLaren will feature in seven episodes.

Filming took place in Vancouver and at the Riverview Hospital in Coquitlam from October 2011 to March 2012. For the first season, production took place in Hamilton and Toronto. Noah Wyle said that the change in location made filming significantly different. A new crew came in for the second season, with only "two or three people on staff that were there in season one." The new staff includes a new writing staff and showrunner.

I watched all of the episodes in a row, and I was going along, going, 'Okay, that's interesting. Okay, I can see something there. Okay, that's good. And when I got to the end, and it was that ending, I went, 'Oh my God, I'm in trouble.' I mean, I thought it was cool, but it's also one of those moments as a writer, where you go, 'Ohhh kay, what do I do with that?' ... I called up Graham Yost and I called up Mark [Verheiden], saying, 'What were you guys thinking?' And they said, 'I dunno. We just thought it was cool.'

— Season two showrunner, Remi Aubuchon

Remi Aubuchon was hired as the showrunner for the second season in May 2011 before the first season premiere. Once Aubuchon entered the writer's room, he began speaking of the cliffhanger "it became a really fun challenge." Out of that cliffhanger, says Aubuchon, "came some really positive things that propel a lot of the storytelling in the second season. And the writers came up with a pretty cool way for Tom Mason to get off that spaceship again." "You'll always catch people after a huge trauma saying, 'Oh, it wasn't that bad.' Or, 'It was fun,' Or, 'It was cool falling off that cliff,'" says Aubuchon. "The truth is, at first it was like, 'Oh my God, should i just say I can't do this job?' Ultimately, though, I think it turned out cool."

Series lead Noah Wyle received several phone calls after the first season finale aired. The number one question was "What the hell were you doing getting on that spaceship?" He said that they "wrote themselves into a corner". Moon Bloodgood, who plays Dr. Anne Glass, says she was sort of daunted but impressed by the writing. Aubuchon added that Tom Mason's capture helped the writer's change the character slightly. He stated: "Tom comes away from that experience feeling used and manipulated. It wasn't the experience [he expected]. He thought he was going to be having a nice conversation with an extraterrestrial being. It turned out to be worse than that. More than that, I won't say. But that's what made it fun."

Greg Beeman, who directed the episode, spoke about Remi Aubuchon's hiring. He said that Remi had "a lot of ideas about how to keep the good stuff we’d established in Season 1", and "diminish the things that weren’t as strong". Steven Spielberg's original conception of Falling Skies was that the characters in the series would be nomadic. The idea for the second season was to "create a mobile refugee camp made up of vehicles and rag-tag tents." Chris Faloona, who was the Director of Photography in the first season, was unable to return due to commitments on another series, and Nate Goodman was hired. Aubuchon and Beeman discussed what was a head for the characters this season, and soon after, Beeman called Connor Jessup, who plays Ben Mason, and said "I’ve just heard what the plans are for you for this season. And my strong advice is that you get a trainer and start eating your Wheaties! You are in a HUGE storyline is going to revolve around you... You're a warrior, you’re a skitter killer and you’re a badass!" Jessup hired a trainer that very day.

== Reception ==
=== Ratings ===
In its original American broadcast, "Worlds Apart" was seen by an estimated 4.46 million household viewers, according to Nielsen Media Research. The episode was down 24% from its series debut, which garnered a 2.0 rating in the 18-49 demographic. Nevertheless, Falling Skies remains TNT's highest-rated scripted series. "Worlds Apart" received a 1.5 rating among viewers between ages 18 and 49, meaning 1.5 percent of viewers in that age bracket watched the episode.

=== Reviews ===
After spending the last several months mulling and anticipating the Falling Skies season 2 premiere, I finally got a look at the two-part debut including the episodes "World's Apart" and "Shall We Gather at the River". Result: I'm stunned. Since the creative team had little or no opportunity to course correct based on viewer feedback in season one, I sort of anticipated season 2 of Falling Skies would be a reboot in many ways, but I never expected the magnitude of improvements I've just witnessed. Falling Skies has set the standard for prime-time action and Science Fiction and delivered an opening act that finally fulfills the promise of a blockbuster level experience on the small screen.

— Jon Lachonis, TV Overmind

Reviews for the episode were strong. Many critics noted a step-up in quality from the first season. Newsday's Verne Gay called stated " "Skies" has made the bad guys intriguing, and now if it can only get serious about character development with the good ones -- humans -- then the second season will be a big improvement." Maureen Ryan of The Huffington Post compared the episode to the first season by saying "Season 2 is a different animal, a much leaner and meaner machine that allows sentiment to be present but unexpressed and depicts a darker world in which innocence is a luxury that no one can truly afford." Chuck Barney declared "Sunday's explosive two-hour opener boldly delivers on the promise by TNT producers to rev up both the pace and the firepower in Season 2." Matt Richenthal of TV Fanatic called the episode a "strong start overall to Falling Skies Season 2," and continued by praising the performances of Wyle, Patton and Cunningham. Screen Rant's Anthony Ocasio praised the episode. "While further episodes will reveal more, the type of character development, intriguing storylines and exciting action that will be contained in Falling Skies season 2, there’s no doubt that TNT’s hit drama will likely become an epic adventure, spanning many seasons," he said.
