= Falling Skies season 2 =

Falling Skies
- Season 2
- Region 1 DVD cover
- Starring: Noah Wyle; Moon Bloodgood; Drew Roy; Connor Jessup; Maxim Knight; Seychelle Gabriel; Peter Shinkoda; Sarah Carter; Mpho Koaho; Colin Cunningham; Will Patton
- No. of episodes: 10

Release
- Original network: TNT
- Original release: June 17 – August 19, 2012

Season chronology
- ← Previous; Season 1 Next → Season 3

The second season of the American television drama series Falling Skies premiered June 17, 2012. It consisted of ten episodes, each running approximately 42 minutes in length. TNT broadcast the second season on Sundays at 9:00 pm ET in the United States.

The season's plot focuses on the 2nd Massachusetts' discovery that a large community of survivors has formed in Charleston, their journey there, and their reception once they arrive. It also focusses on the discovery that the Skitters are themselves "harnessed" and mind-controlled by the invaders, but that some of them are resistant to the effects and are rebelling against their Overlords..

== Cast and characters ==
=== Main ===
- Noah Wyle is Tom Mason, a former Boston University history professor who becomes the second-in-command of the 2nd Massachusetts, a group of roughly 250 civilians and fighters fleeing post-apocalyptic Boston. He has three sons: Hal, the oldest, Ben, the middle child who was taken by the Skitters, and Matt, the youngest. His wife died a short time after the invasion while gathering supplies. He is good friends with Anne Glass, and also shares some of her views on the rights of civilians. Last season he went with Karen and the aliens on their ship to find out if he can save Ben, however they lied. Later on they let him go and he went back to the 2nd Mass. He is now in a relationship with Anne and is having a fourth child with her.
- Moon Bloodgood as Anne Glass, the 2nd Mass's doctor. She was a pediatrician before the invasion. She is very inclined towards the civilians, and believes that they should do all they can to help them. Her husband and son were killed at home in the bombings during the invasion. She is now in a relationship with Tom. She is also pregnant with Tom's baby.
- Drew Roy as Hal Mason, Tom's oldest son. He is 16 years old, and a Scout in the 2nd Mass. His girlfriend was Karen, but now he is with Maggie. Although Hal is sometimes cold toward Ben and Matt, his younger brothers, and his father, he cares about his family. At the end of the season, Karen infected Hal and now he is under possession.
- Connor Jessup as Ben Mason, Tom's 14-year-old second son who was captured by the Skitters. In the pilot, Hal saw Ben with one of the Skitter's harnesses on his back, which they apparently use to control children. He is eventually rescued from the Skitters and is made free from his harness. He is now a member of the 2nd Mass fighting alongside the group. He has enhanced strength and durability which helps him fight. Midway through the second season, Ben becomes the human leader of the Skitter rebellion. This puts the 2nd Mass in a large amount of danger as Ben becomes a large target for the alien Overlords. At the end of the season, Ben returns to the 2nd Mass and his family.
- Maxim Knight as Matt, Tom's youngest son. He is having trouble adjusting to life after the invasion, particularly the death of his mother and the disappearance of his brother Ben. His brother is back though. He wants to be part of the 2nd Mass and help as well.
- Seychelle Gabriel as Lourdes, a former first year medical student who assists Anne. She is religious, and her beliefs persist despite the circumstances. She has a crush on Hal, which is dissuaded for the most part by Karen. She was recently in a relationship with a mechanic named Jamil, but he was recently killed.
- Peter Shinkoda as Dai, a fighter. Dai does not have a wife or children, so in an odd way, he considers himself a little lucky not to have lost a loved one during the attack. He died at the end of the season.
- Sarah Carter as Margaret ("Maggie"), a woman who used to be part of Pope's gang. She helped Tom and his team escape after they were captured by Pope. Margaret was also "recruited" by Pope (and raped by Pope's brother and other gang members), and she kills Pope's brother and another member of his gang before they leave. She wants to earn a place in the 2nd Mass. When she was 16 she had brain cancer. She is now in a relationship with Hal.
- Mpho Koaho as Anthony, a former Boston cop who is a fighter in the 2nd Mass and a part of Tom's team.
- Colin Cunningham as John Pope, the leader of a post-apocalyptic gang. He captured Tom, Hal, Karen, Anthony, and Dai and intended to trade them back to the 2nd Mass in exchange for an M2 Browning, food and one of their Pontiac GTO. However, the plan backfired when Margaret helped Tom and the rest escape, and Pope was captured and the rest of his gang killed.
- Will Patton as Dan Weaver, the commander of the 2nd Mass. Weaver is a retired active and reserve military officer with the rank of captain, who served with Porter during the Gulf War. He does not like that the 2nd Mass includes so many civilians, and this is a point on which he and Anne often clash. He tried to save his family when the Skitters came, but he was not fast enough. He tells Tom that if his kids were still alive he would do anything to find them. It is revealed in the episode "Grace" that Weaver was a religious man but that he lost faith when the Skitters came. This is shown when Lourdes is reciting a prayer: Weaver is whispering it to himself as well. He also seems to have a paternal affection for the young soldier Jimmy Boland as shown when he comforts him in "Sanctuary Part 1". He later discovers it is possible that his wife and eldest daughter are still alive. He found his eldest daughter alive, but he found out from her that his wife died.

=== Recurring ===
- Dale Dye as Colonel Porter
- Dylan Authors as Jimmy Boland
- Ryan Robbins as Tector Murphy
- Brad Kelly as Lyle
- Luciana Carro as Crazy Lee
- Brandon Jay McLaren as Jamil Dexter
- Billy Wickman as Boon
- Laci J Mailey as Jeanne Weaver
- Jessy Schram as Karen Nadler
- Matt Frewer as General Cole Bressler
- Terry O'Quinn as Arthur Manchester
- Ty Olson as Sergeant Clemmens

== Production ==
I watched all of the episodes in a row, and I was going along, going, 'Okay, that's interesting. Okay, I can see something there. Okay, that's good. And when I got to the end, and it was that ending, I went, 'Oh my God, I'm in trouble.' I mean, I thought it was cool, but it's also one of those moments as a writer, where you go, 'Ohhh kay, what do I do with that?' ... I called up Graham Yost and I called up Mark [Verheiden], saying, 'What were you guys thinking?' And they said, 'I dunno. We just thought it was cool.'

— Season two showrunner, Remi Aubuchon

Promotional poster for the second season

Falling Skies was renewed on July 7, 2011, for a second season. TNT announced production had begun on the second season on October 24, 2011. For the second season, Brandon Jay McLaren joined the cast in October as Jamil Dexter, a mechanic. McLaren will feature in seven episodes.

Filming took place in Vancouver and at the Riverview Hospital in Coquitlam from October 2011 to March 2012. For the first season, production took place in Hamilton and Toronto. Noah Wyle said that the change in location made filming significantly different. A new crew came in for the second season, with only "two or three people on staff that were there in season one." The new staff includes a new writing staff and showrunner.

Remi Aubuchon was hired as the showrunner for the second season in May 2011 before the first-season premiere. Once Aubuchon entered the writer's room, he began speaking of the cliffhanger "it became a really fun challenge." Out of that cliffhanger, says Aubuchon, "came some really positive things that propel a lot of the storytelling in the second season. And the writers came up with a pretty cool way for Tom Mason to get off that spaceship again." "You'll always catch people after a huge trauma saying, 'Oh, it wasn't that bad.' Or, 'It was fun,' Or, 'It was cool falling off that cliff,'" says Aubuchon. "The truth is, at first it was like, 'Oh my God, should i just say I can't do this job?' Ultimately, though, I think it turned out cool." Series lead Noah Wyle received several phone calls after the first-season finale aired. The number one question was "What the hell were you doing getting on that spaceship?" He said that they "wrote themselves into a corner". Moon Bloodgood, who plays Dr. Anne Glass, says she was sort of daunted but impressed by the writing. Aubuchon added that Tom Mason's capture helped the writer's change the character slightly. He stated: "Tom comes away from that experience feeling used and manipulated. It wasn't the experience [he expected]. He thought he was going to be having a nice conversation with an extraterrestrial being. It turned out to be worse than that. More than that, I won't say. But that's what made it fun."

Greg Beeman, who directed the episode, spoke about Remi Aubuchon's hiring. He said that Remi had "a lot of ideas about how to keep the good stuff we'd established in Season 1", and "diminish the things that weren't as strong". Steven Spielberg's original conception of Falling Skies was that the characters in the series would be nomadic. The idea for the second season was to "create a mobile refugee camp made up of vehicles and rag-tag tents." Chris Faloona, who was the Director of Photography in the first season, was unable to return due to commitments on another series, and Nate Goodman was hired. He worked with Greg Beeman on the NBC series Heroes. Aubuchon and Beeman discussed what was ahead for the characters this season, and soon after, Beeman called Connor Jessup, who plays Ben Mason, and said "I've just heard what the plans are for you for this season. And my strong advice is that you get a trainer and start eating your Wheaties! You are in a HUGE storyline is going to revolve around you… You're a warrior, you're a skitter killer and you're a badass!" Jessup hired a trainer that very day.

== Promotion ==
Promotion for the season includes a digital comic book, entitled Falling Skies: The Battle of Fitchburg. The comic was published by Dark Horse Comics and was launched on April 18, 2012. Bridging the gap between seasons, the comic picks up where the first season left off. TNT launched a webseries titled 2nd Watch on June 17, 2012 to air after the second-season premiere. Wil Wheaton hosted the show, which ran throughout the entire second season of Falling Skies. The episodes are available on the Falling Skies official website.

== Episodes ==
No. overall	No. in season	Title	Directed by	Written by	Original release date	US viewers (millions)
11	1	"Worlds Apart"	Greg Beeman	Mark Verheiden	June 17, 2012	4.46
12	2	"Shall We Gather at the River"	Greg Beeman	Bradley Thompson & David Weddle	June 17, 2012	4.46
13	3	"Compass"	Michael Katleman	Bryan Oh	June 24, 2012	3.81
14	4	"Young Bloods"	Miguel Sapochnik	Heather V. Regnier	July 1, 2012	3.39
15	5	"Love and Other Acts of Courage"	John Dahl	Joe Weisberg	July 8, 2012	3.64
16	6	"Homecoming"	Greg Beeman	Bryan Oh	July 15, 2012	3.61
17	7	"Molon Labe"	Holly Dale	Bradley Thompson & David Weddle	July 22, 2012	3.45
18	8	"Death March"	Seith Mann	Heather V. Regnier	August 5, 2012	3.34
The 2nd Mass convoy pushes on to Charleston as tensions grow between Pope, Hal and Maggie. Weaver discovers more about Tector's past on the long drive.
19	9	"The Price of Greatness"	Adam Kane	Mark Verheiden	August 12, 2012	3.46
The 2nd Mass finally reaches Charleston and is introduced to some familiar and new faces. However, the new setting turns out not to be quite what they imagined.
20	10	"A More Perfect Union"	Greg Beeman	Remi Aubuchon and Bradley Thompson & David Weddle	August 19, 2012	3.84
An impending Skitter presence causes mixed reactions throughout the Charleston base. New loyalties are made and tested, alliances created and lost.

== Reception ==
=== Reviews ===
The second season was well received by critics. Many praised it as being stronger than the first, noting a step-up in quality. Maureen Ryan of The Huffington Post compared the second season to the first by saying "Season 2 is a different animal, a much leaner and meaner machine that allows sentiment to be present but unexpressed and depicts a darker world in which innocence is a luxury that no one can truly afford." Chuck Barney declared "Sunday's explosive two-hour opener boldly delivers on the promise by TNT producers to rev up both the pace and the firepower in Season 2." Screen Rant's Anthony Ocasio lauded the season premiere. "While further episodes will reveal more, the type of character development, intriguing storylines and exciting action that will be contained in Falling Skies season 2, there's no doubt that TNT's hit drama will likely become an epic adventure, spanning many seasons," he said.

=== Ratings ===
Episode number	Title	Original air date	Ratings share (Adults 18–49)	Viewers (in millions)	Rank per week on Cable
1	"Worlds Apart"	June 17, 2012	1.5	4.46	#10
2	"Shall We Gather at the River"	June 17, 2012	1.5	4.46	#10
3	"Compass"	June 24, 2012	1.3	3.81	#18
4	"Young Bloods"	July 1, 2012	1.2	3.39	
5	"Love and Other Acts of Courage"	July 8, 2012	1.2	3.64	#13
6	"Homecoming"	July 15, 2012	1.2	3.61	
7	"Molon Labe"	July 22, 2012	1.2	3.45	#25
8	"Death March"	August 5, 2012	1.3	3.34	#15
9	"The Price of Greatness"	August 12, 2012	1.3	3.46	#15
10	"A More Perfect Union"	August 19, 2012	1.4	3.84	#18
