= Homecoming (Falling Skies) =

- Falling Skies episode
- Episode no.: Season 2 Episode 6
- Directed by: Greg Beeman
- Written by: Bryan Oh
- Production code: 206
- Original air date: July 15, 2012

Episode chronology
← Previous "Love and Other Acts of Courage"	Next → "Molon Labe"
- Falling Skies season 2

"Homecoming" is the sixth episode of the second season of the American television drama series Falling Skies, and the 16th overall episode of the series. It originally aired on TNT in the United States on July 15, 2012. It was written by Brian Oh and directed by Greg Beeman.

== Plot ==
Hal stumbles across corpses of de-harnessed kids, among them Karen, alive. Tom and Anne grow closer. Weaver’s health deteriorates just as Tom discovers he may have been keeping important matters from the group in order to protect them.

== Reception ==
=== Ratings ===
In its original American broadcast, "Homecoming" was seen by an estimated 3.61 million household viewers, according to Nielsen Media Research. "Homecoming" received a 1.2 rating among viewers between ages 18 and 49, meaning 1.2 percent of viewers in that age bracket watched the episode.

=== Reviews ===
Les Chappell of The A.V. Club awarded the episode with a score of B.
