= Habartice =

Habartice may refer to places in the Czech Republic:

- Habartice (Liberec District), a municipality and village in the Liberec Region
- Habartice (Jindřichov), a village and part of Jindřichov in the Olomouc Region
- Habartice, a village and part of Klatovy in the Plzeň Region
