= Deirdre (disambiguation) =

Deirdre is the name of a tragic heroine in Irish mythology.

Deirdre may also refer to:

- Deirdre (given name), a list of people and fictional characters
- "Deirdre" (song), a song by the Beach Boys
- Deirdre (horse), a Thoroughbred racehorse
- Deirdre, a 1907 poem by W. B. Yeats
- LÉ Deirdre (P20), a ship in the Irish Naval Service
- Deirdre of the Sorrows, a 1909 play by J. M. Synge

== See also ==
- Dierdre (artist), world fusion artist Dierdre Dubois, former frontwoman of Ekova
- Deidre
