= Compass (Falling Skies) =

- Falling Skies episode
- Episode no.: Season 2 Episode 3
- Directed by: Michael Katleman
- Written by: Brian Oh
- Production code: 203
- Original air date: June 24, 2012

Episode chronology
← Previous "Shall We Gather at the River"	Next → "Young Bloods"
- Falling Skies season 2

"Compass" is the third episode of the second season of the American television drama series Falling Skies, and the 13th overall episode of the series. It originally aired on TNT in the United States on June 24, 2012. It was written by Brian Oh and directed by Michael Katleman.

== Plot ==
The remnants of 2nd Mass have set up a temporary base at an abandoned airfield; Anne is overwhelmed with patients who have the flu while Ben and Jimmy are out on patrol duty and kill a group of Skitters. Tom, who was assisting Anne, is kidnapped by Pope and his men and taken outside of the airfield and is told that quite a few people are afraid of Tom and question his escape from the aliens and demand that he leave the group. Ben and Jimmy get the drop on Pope and disarm him, and take him back to base. Weaver contemplates kicking Pope and his men out, but Tom insists that he be made part of Pope's "Berserker" group and put under Pope's command to keep an eye on him.

The next night Jimmy and Ben, who have been going out beyond the perimeter looking for aliens, find another group of skitters. They kill two of them but the third one exerts some influence over Ben and paralyzes him, causing his spikes to glow blue. Jimmy attacks the alien, and is thrown against a tree. The alien runs off and Ben snaps out of his daze, and finds that Jimmy was impaled on a branch. He brings Jimmy back to the airfield where Anne does her best to save him. Weaver and Tom find out that Ben was deliberately seeking out aliens to kill as revenge for kidnapping him. Pope, Tom and the Berserkers head out to the spot where Jimmy was hurt and find his compass and encounter a group of aliens collecting the bodies of their dead. Pope orders them to attack but Tom countermands the order; shortly thereafter a mech arrives and escorts the aliens away. At the airfield, a plane arrives carrying a messenger from Charleston, who advises the 2nd Mass, that several groups of survivors as well as remnants of the U.S. government are massing in Charleston and have access to supplies and hot water. Weaver believes their best chance for survival is to head into the Catskill Mountains, while Tom believes that Charleston is the best option for staying in the fight as hiding in the mountains would be tantamount to surrendering.

Despite Anne's best efforts, Jimmy dies of his wounds. Tom, when reminding the Berserkers of their impending move, notices that Pope has Jimmy's compass. Tom demands he return it, and Pope refuses and calls Jimmy's funeral "an empty gesture". Tom attacks Pope and savagely beats him before being restrained. Weaver sides with Tom, believing Pope was out of line. Pope decides to leave 2nd Mass and only Anthony leaves with him, more out of a desire to keep an eye on Pope than anything. Weaver decides to go to Charleston, and before they leave they have a funeral service for Jimmy. Afterwards Ben approaches Weaver who is standing at Jimmy's grave and breaks down, blaming himself for Jimmy's death while Weaver holds him.

The 2nd Mass begins to leave for Charleston, when Tom realizes that Ben is missing from the group. Hal leaves in search of him. Ben is found still at Jimmy's grave, when suddenly, the skitter who previously exerted control on Ben reappears. The skitter controls him for a few seconds again, and seems to communicate with him. The skitter then breaks off and runs when it hears Hal's motorcycle approaching. Hal retrieves Ben and they head back, and Ben withholds the events that just transpired.

== Reception ==
=== Ratings ===
In its original American broadcast, "Compass" was seen by an estimated 3.81 million household viewers, according to Nielsen Media Research. "Compass" received a 1.3 rating among viewers between ages 18 and 49, meaning 1.3 percent of viewers in that age bracket watched the episode. It was down two tenths from the season premiere.
