= Shall We Gather at the River (Falling Skies) =

- Falling Skies episode
- Episode no.: Season 2 Episode 2
- Directed by: Greg Beeman
- Written by: Bradley Thompson; David Weddle
- Production code: 202
- Original air date: June 17, 2012

Episode chronology
| ← Previous "Worlds Apart" | Next → "Compass" |
- Falling Skies season 2

"Shall We Gather at the River" is the second episode of the second season of the American television drama series Falling Skies, and the 12th overall episode of the series. It originally aired on TNT in the United States on June 17, 2012 as a two-hour season premiere with the first episode of the season. It was written by Bradley Thompson & David Weddle and directed by Greg Beeman.

== Plot ==
Tom begins having nightmares about the Skitters recapturing him. A parasite is found in Tom's eye, forcing him to question his own loyalty. The 2nd Mass has to find a way to cross a destroyed bridge. Ben offers to cross the river alone to scout the area ahead. He learns that the ships are controlling a structure ahead. The bridge is fixed and vehicles begin to cross. However, airships begin to approach the 2nd Mass. Ben, Hal, Maggie and Dai blow up the structure controlling them, sending the ships away from the bridge. A swarm of Skitters and Mechs attempts to cross the bridge and attack the fighters. Tom slows them down by firing at them. Tom then runs, attempting to cross back. The 2nd Mass had planned to blow up the bridge. Weaver tries to wait for Tom but Pope detonates. Tom is, again, assumed dead. However, he swims back and the 2nd Mass heads to an abandoned airport.

== Reception ==
=== Ratings ===
In its original American broadcast, "Shall We Gather at the River" was seen by an estimated 4.46 million household viewers, according to Nielsen Media Research. The episode was down 24% from its series debut, which garnered a 2.0 rating in the 18-49 demographic. Nevertheless, Falling Skies remains TNT's highest-rated scripted series. "Shall We Gather at the River" received a 1.5 rating among viewers between ages 18 and 49, meaning 1.5 percent of viewers in that age bracket watched the episode.

=== Reviews ===
After spending the last several months mulling and anticipating the Falling Skies season 2 premiere, I finally got a look at the two-part debut including the episodes "World's Apart" and "Shall We Gather at the River". Result: I'm stunned. Since the creative team had little or no opportunity to course correct based on viewer feedback in season one, I sort of anticipated season 2 of Falling Skies would be a reboot in many ways, but I never expected the magnitude of improvements I've just witnessed. Falling Skies has set the standard for prime-time action and Science Fiction and delivered an opening act that finally fulfills the promise of a blockbuster level experience on the small screen.

— Jon Lachonis, TV Overmind

Reviews for the episode were strong. Many critics noted a step-up in quality from the first season. Newday's Verne Gay called stated "'Skies' has made the bad guys intriguing, and now if it can only get serious about character development with the good ones — humans — then the second season will be a big improvement." Maureen Ryan of The Huffington Post compared the episode to the first season by saying "Season 2 is a different animal, a much leaner and meaner machine that allows sentiment to be present but unexpressed and depicts a darker world in which innocence is a luxury that no one can truly afford." Chuck Barney declared "Sunday's explosive two-hour opener boldly delivers on the promise by TNT producers to rev up both the pace and the firepower in Season 2." Matt Richenthal of TV Fanatic called the episode a "strong start overall to Falling Skies Season 2," and continued by praising the performances of Wyle, Patton and Cunningham. Screen Rant's Anthony Ocasio praised the episode. "While further episodes will reveal more, the type of character development, intriguing storylines and exciting action that will be contained in Falling Skies season 2, there’s no doubt that TNT’s hit drama will likely become an epic adventure, spanning many seasons," he said.
