= Molon labe (disambiguation) =

Molon labe is an ancient Greek battle cry meaning "Come and take them".

Molon labe can also refer to:

- Molon Labe! (book), a 2004 novel by Kenneth W. Royce
- "Molon Labe" (Falling Skies), an episode of the TV series Falling Skies, first aired in 2012
