= Deirdre Shoemaker =

American physicist

- Born: 1971 (age 54–55)

Academic background
- Education: Pennsylvania State University; University of Texas at Austin
- Doctoral advisor: Richard Matzner

Academic work
- Institutions: University of Texas at Austin; Pennsylvania State University; Cornell University; Georgia Tech
- Main interests: Mergers of binary black holes

Deirdre Marie Shoemaker (born 1971) is an American astrophysicist whose research studies the mergers of binary black holes through both simulation and observation. She is a professor of physics at the University of Texas at Austin, where she directs the Center for Gravitational Physics and is affiliated with the Oden Institute for Computational Engineering and Sciences.

== Education and career ==
Shoemaker majored in physics, astronomy, and astrophysics at Pennsylvania State University, graduating in 1994. She completed her Ph.D. in physics at the University of Texas at Austin in 1999, supervised by Richard Matzner. Next, she did postdoctoral research with Lee Samuel Finn and Jorge Pullin in the Center for Gravitational Wave Physics at Pennsylvania State University and with Saul Teukolsky in the Center for Radiophysics and Space Research at Cornell University.

She returned again to Pennsylvania State University as an assistant professor of physics in 2004. She moved to Georgia Tech in 2008, and added an adjunct affiliation with the Georgia Tech School of Computational Science and Engineering in 2009. She was given tenure as an associate professor in 2011, and named director of the Center for Relativistic Astrophysics in 2013. She was promoted to full professor in 2016, and given an endowed professorship as Dunn Family Professor of Physics in 2017.

In 2020, she moved to the University of Texas at Austin as a professor of physics and director of the Center for Gravitational Physics. She is a member of the LIGO Scientific Collaboration, and chairs the Waveform Working Group of the Laser Interferometer Space Antenna (LISA) Consortium.

== Recognition ==
Shoemaker was named a Fellow of the American Physical Society (APS) in 2013, after a nomination from the APS Division of Computational Physics, "for her leading role in the investigation of dynamical and binary black hole space-times and their observational signatures".
