= Young Bloods (Falling Skies) =

- Falling Skies episode
- Episode no.: Season 2 Episode 4
- Directed by: Miguel Sapochnik
- Written by: Heather V. Regnier
- Production code: 204
- Original air date: July 1, 2012

Episode chronology
← Previous "Compass"	Next → "Love and Other Acts of Courage"
- Falling Skies season 2

"Young Bloods" is the fourth episode of the second season of the American television drama series Falling Skies, and the 14th overall episode of the series. It originally aired on TNT in the United States on July 1, 2012. It was written by Heather V. Regnier and directed by Miguel Sapochnik.

== Plot ==
Matt gets used as skitter bait by two members of the Berserkers. When Tom finds out he chews both of them out for putting his son at risk. Matt feels like his dad has embarrassed him in front of the people he was getting respect from for being courageous. While on patrol together, Ben and Hal try to help a young boy and wind up having their bikes stolen. The hunt to recover them leads them to the discovery of a group of "Lost Boys" including Weaver's daughter (and Diego's girlfriend), Jeanne. Ben and Hal offer the young group and their leader Diego supplies and support from the 2nd Mass. Diego, Jeanne and two other boys leave with Ben and Hal. They gather supplies from the 2nd Mass while Weaver and Jeanne reunite. Lourdes finds out from Diego that Northern Mexico (where her family lives) was totally destroyed. Jeanne returns with Diego and the other boys with the supplies after promising Weaver to return shortly. Upon arriving at the youth's hideout, they find the place trashed and only one boy left who managed to hide from the aliens. They return to the 2nd Mass where Diego and Weaver have problems developing a plan together to free the youths from the Harnessing facility they suspect the captives have been taken to. Diego, Jeanne, Matt and the other youths leave on their bikes after storming out of the meeting, intending to act quickly to free their comrades. Tom finds out that Diego and the other youths took Matt with them and the 2nd Mass sends out a rescue crew without a clear plan. They break into the facility and storm the Harnessing room saving Jeanne and Matt just in time. Hal sees Ben interact with one of the Harnessing creatures where his spikes glow. The group destroys the facility as best they can and return to camp. Jeanne leaves with Diego after leaving a note for Weaver letting him know she wants to wait out the invasion in hiding with Diego and the other youth.

== Reception ==
=== Ratings ===
In its original American broadcast, "Young Bloods" was seen by an estimated 3.39 million household viewers, according to Nielsen Media Research. "Young Bloods" received a 1.2 rating among viewers between ages 18 and 49, meaning 1.2 percent of viewers in that age bracket watched the episode. It was down one tenth from the previous episode.

=== Reviews ===
Les Chappell of The A.V. Club awarded the episode with a score of B+. He praised the action sequences in comparison to the first season, stating, "the action bar remains raised as well", continuing "We’ve chiefly seen big outdoor battles this season, so it’s encouraging to see the show can maintain its pace."
