= The Lyon's Den =

- Series title card
- Genre: Legal drama
- Created by: Remi Aubuchon
- Starring: Rob Lowe; Matt Craven; Elizabeth Mitchell; Kyle Chandler; James Pickens, Jr.; Frances Fisher; David Krumholtz
- Composer: W.G. Snuffy Walden
- Country of origin: United States
- Original language: English
- No. of seasons: 1
- No. of episodes: 13 (7 unaired)

Production
- Executive producers: Remi Aubuchon; Kevin Falls; Rob Lowe; Bernie Brillstein; Jack Clements; Brad Grey; Rod Holcomb
- Running time: 60 minutes
- Production companies: Brad Grey Television; Baby Owl Works Productions; 20th Century Fox Television

Original release
- Network: NBC
- Release: September 28 – November 30, 2003

The Lyon's Den is a 2003 American legal drama television series. Set in Washington, D.C., it stars Rob Lowe as a lawyer named Jack Turner, who has been newly appointed as partner of a long-established law firm that, as the plot revealed, harbored some dark secrets. The cast also included Matt Craven, Elizabeth Mitchell, Kyle Chandler, Frances Fisher, and David Krumholtz. Both the series' title and firm's name are allusions to the surname of Lowe, who also served as executive producer. Much of the plot is centered on the firm's internal politics and on Turner's attempts to uncover information on some of the firm's conspiracies while acting as the defense of its higher-profile clients in a different case each episode.

The series premiered on the American television network NBC on September 28, 2003, but although thirteen episodes were ordered and produced, only six aired before NBC cancelled the series on November 30, 2003, due to low ratings. When the UK's channel Five bought the United Kingdom terrestrial TV rights to the series in 2004, it aired all thirteen episodes. Rob Lowe has stated that after finding out about the show's cancellation he and the show's producers decided to make the last episodes —which they were contractually obligated to make— as absurd as possible, including an "off the wall" and freakish ending.

== Characters ==
Character descriptions courtesy of Entertainment Weekly and The Blade

- John "Jack" Turner (Rob Lowe), "the most principled lawyer" working for the corrupt firm Lyons, Lacrosse, and Levine longtime friend
- Grant Rashton (Kyle Chandler), one of "amoral lawyers"
- Brit Hanley (Frances Fisher), Rashton's "evil secretary"
- Ariel Saxon (Elizabeth Mitchell), a lawyer recovering from alcoholism, hired by her lover Rashton to "discredit Jack"
- Jeff Fineman (David Krumholtz), Ariel Saxon's paralegal, who is attracted to her
- Terrance Christianson (James Pickens Jr.), one of "amoral lawyers"
- Harlan M. Turner (Rip Torn), the Washington, D.C. senator and Jack's father

== Episodes ==
No.	Title	Directed by	Written by	Original release date	Prod. code
1	"Pilot"	Rod Holcomb	Remi Aubuchon	September 28, 2003	1AHL79
2	"The Other Side of Caution"	Daniel Sackheim	Story by : Remi Aubuchon; Teleplay by : Jon Cowan, Robert Rovner & Remi Aubuchon	October 5, 2003	1AHL01
3	"Things She Said"	Vincent Misiano	Kevin Falls	October 12, 2003	1AHL02
4	"Hubris"	Paul Michael Glaser	Judith McCreary	October 19, 2003	1AHL03
5	"Trick or Treat"	Jack Bender	Jon Cowan & Robert Rovner	October 26, 2003	1AHL04
6	"Ex"	Jessica Yu	Karyn Usher	November 30, 2003	1AHL05
7	"The Quantum Theory"	Elodie Keene	Alfredo Barrios Jr.	Unaired	1AHL06
8	"The Fifth"	Timothy Busfield	Kevin Falls	Unaired	1AHL07
9	"Separation Anxiety"	Paul Shapiro	Judith McCreary	Unaired	1AHL08
10	"Blood"	Daniel Sackheim	Jon Cowan & Robert Rovner	Unaired	1AHL09
11	"Beach House"	Peter O'Fallon	Katie Botel	Unaired	1AHL10
12	"Duty to Save"	Peter Levin	Brett Mahoney	Unaired	1AHL11
13	"Privileged"	Jack Bender	Alfredo Barrios Jr. & Karyn Usher	Unaired	1AHL12

== Production ==
=== Singer Jewel's casting ===
In his memoir, Love Life, Lowe stated that he lobbied for singer-actress Jewel to be cast as his love interest in the show after seeing her performance in Ang Lee's cult film Ride With The Devil. However, when she arrived on set there was no chemistry between the two and Jewel brought her then-boyfriend, rodeo star Ty Murray, to the set with her on the day the actors were to film a love scene. According to Lowe, Jewel appeared uncomfortable at having to kiss Lowe, and unsuccessfully asked if the scene could be removed.

Finally relenting by stating, "Let's just do this", Lowe said Jewel agreed to do the scene. Lowe stated: "But as we approached the kissing moment it became strained and it's never good when you can't trust that your fellow actor is on the same page... I pecked her on the lips; her mouth scrunched closed like you would do if someone was going to stick something unwanted into it, which I was not intending. I sort of moved my head from side to side to make it look real, like there was at least a dollop of energy or passion. 'Cut', said the director. Jewel looked at me and wiped the back of her hand across her lips like an American Sign Language version of 'Yuck'".

Jewel was one of the celebrities chosen to roast Rob Lowe in 2015. She joked that she had asked to write out the kiss with Lowe "because I knew where that mouth had been."

== Cancellation and improvised ending ==
Lowe said, in a May 9, 2014 appearance on the NPR radio gameshow Wait Wait Don't Tell Me, that he and the show's producers purposefully made all 13 episodes – which they were contractually obligated to make for possible DVD distribution – as absurd as possible. The last episode ended with Lowe's character, John Turner, being exposed as a serial killer and confronted by Grant Rushton (Kyle Chandler), whom he then kills with a hidden knife. After murdering Grant, Turner stands on the ledge of the law firm's building apparently intent on jumping, but he instead calls someone on his cellphone and says: "Dad, there's been another accident" before the screen fades to black and the series end.
