= Pusté Žibřidovice =

Coordinates: 50°5′10″N 16°59′19″E

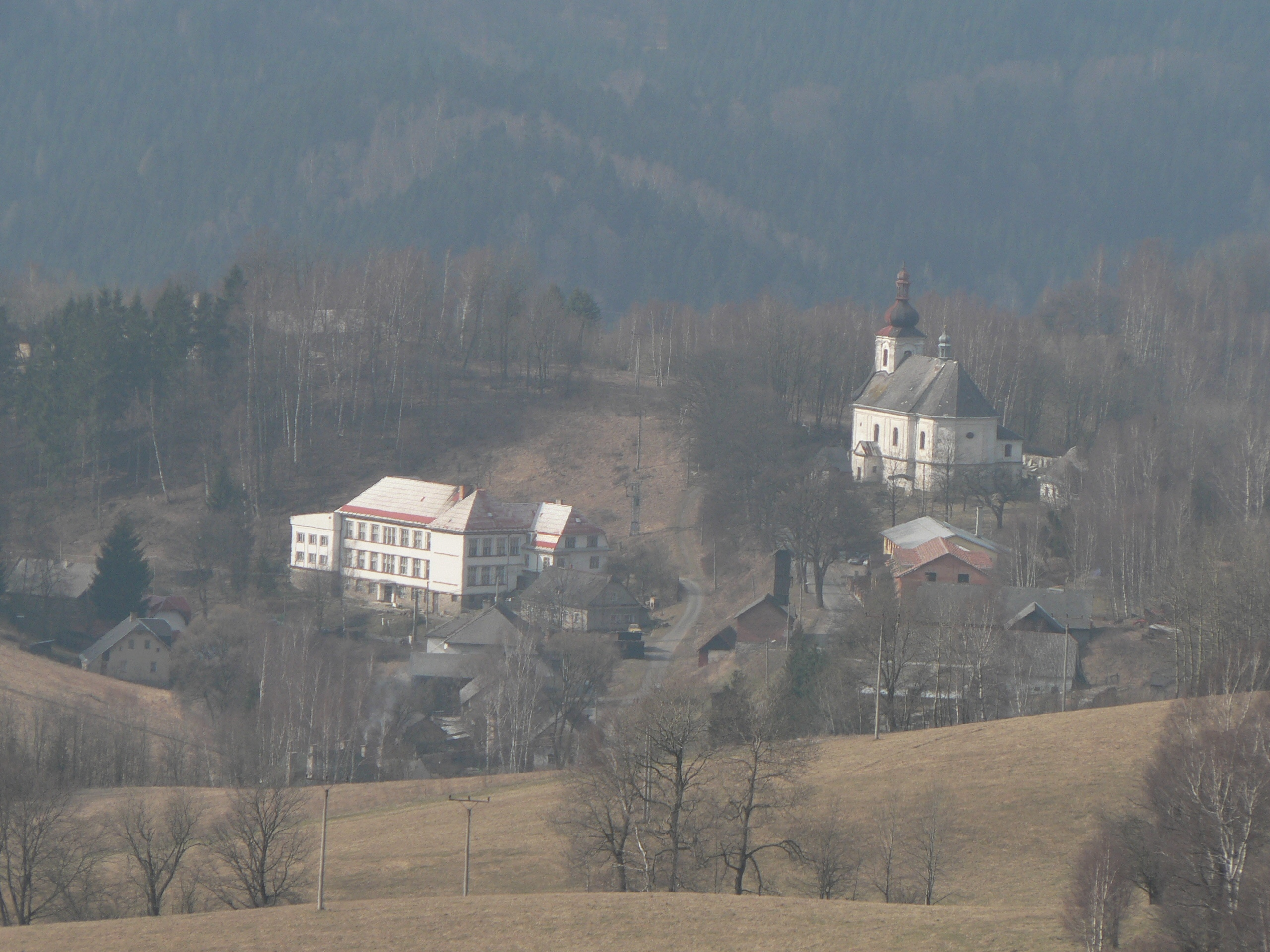
Pusté Žibřidovice

Pusté Žibřidovice (German: Wüst Seibersdorf) is a village and administrative part of Jindřichov in Šumperk District in the Olomouc Region of the Czech Republic.

== Etymology ==
Very original name was Seyfersdorf which means Seyfer's village. The name later evolved into Seibersdorf. From 15th century, the place is called Wüst Seibersdorf where the adjectivum "wüst" means "deserted", the village was probably plundered by Hungarian soldiers during Bohemian War. Czech name is a loan translation.

== History ==
The village was probably founded by German settlers. The first note comes from 1382. German citizens were expulsed after WWII and the area was repopulated by Czech people. In 1949, Pusté Žibřidovice has lost its autonomy and was attached to Jindřichov.
