= Love and Other Acts of Courage =

- Falling Skies episode
- Episode no.: Season 2 Episode 5
- Directed by: John Dahl
- Written by: Joe Weisberg
- Production code: 205
- Original air date: July 8, 2012

Episode chronology
← Previous "Young Bloods"	Next → "Homecoming"
- Falling Skies season 2

"Love and Other Acts of Courage" is the fifth episode of the second season of the American television drama series Falling Skies, and the 15th overall episode of the series. It originally aired on TNT in the United States on July 8, 2012. It was written by Joe Weisberg and directed by John Dahl.

== Plot ==
The second Mass witnesses explosions in the distance and assume a resistance. When they arrive they find only destroyed Mech and charred skitters. Hal sees a former harnessed child under the debris with glowing spikes, he digs the child out assuming it to be Ben. It is revealed to be Rick—the child who betrayed the 2nd Mass by giving attack plans to the aliens just before the attack on the tower.

After recovering, Rick and Ben lead Tom and the Berzerkers to a warehouse to find an injured skitter with one red eye—the same one in charge of Tom's torture on the ship and the same one that killed Jimmy Boland. They both beg them to help the skitter explaining he is a rebel; some skitters can fight the control of the harness and have formed a rebellion. They wish to fight together with the humans to defeat the overlords.

Hal bonds with Maggie as she begins to open up about her past.

== Reception ==
=== Ratings ===
In its original American broadcast, "Love and Other Acts of Courage" was seen by an estimated 3.64 million household viewers, according to Nielsen Media Research. "Love and Other Acts of Courage" received a 1.2 rating among viewers between ages 18 and 49, meaning 1.2 percent of viewers in that age bracket watched the episode.

=== Reviews ===
Les Chappell of The A.V. Club awarded the episode with a score of C+. Chris Carabott from IGN gave the episode a score of 7.5.
