= Deidre Gillard-Rowlings =

Canadian actress

Deidre Gillard-Rowlings is a Canadian film, television, and stage actress, who is best known for her role as Nurse Myra Bennett in Robert Chafe's Tempting Providence and for her work at the Stratford Festival.

== History ==
Originally from the Great Northern Peninsula of Newfoundland, Gillard-Rowlings grew up in the small communities of Englee and Main Brook. In 2014, she told a local newspaper that growing up in a “remote, beautiful and stark place with a lot of space to think, dream and create” had a profound impact on her life in theatre.

She received a Bachelor of Fine Arts from Memorial University of Newfoundland (Sir Wilfred Grenfell College Campus), making the Principal's Honor List for 1990. She graduated in 1994, as part of Grenfell's third graduating class. Following graduation, she founded, with her classmates, Bare Boards Theatre with a mandate to create contemporary theatre with spartan and inventive methods. Bare Boards Theatre is a volunteer-based company, organized by Grenfell Theatre graduates.

She owns a piece of property in Gros Morne National Park which she is developing as a skills collective. In 2019, she received the Helen Creighton Folklore Society Grants-in-Aid for her work interviewing two traditional Newfoundland weavers. In March 2021, it was announced that she had won the 2020 ArtsNL Rhonda Payne Theatre Award.

== Tempting Providence ==
Tempting Providence, produced by Theatre Newfoundland Labrador and written by playwright Robert Chafe, tells the story of Myra Bennett, "a woman who travelled to Canada to become one of the first outport nurses on the isolated Northern Peninsula of Newfoundland, and became a legend for performing a variety of medical tasks, from delivering babies to setting bones to extracting teeth." Growing up in Newfoundland, Gillard-Rowlings remembered her grandparents telling her about the legendary outport nurse:

"My grandmother ran a private clinic and so I heard lots of stories about Myra and I even drove by her house twice but I never met her," she said from her home in Newfoundland. "By all accounts, Myra was a really, really driven woman with strong Christian beliefs, who was very selfless yet stern and strict she had that British stiff upper lip. She would often say she wasn't there to make friends but rather to help the sick."

From 2002–2012, Gillard-Rowlings toured nationally and internationally with the production, performing the role of Myra Bennett over 622 times. With the project since its inception, Deidre Gillard-Rowlings brought Nurse Bennett "to full and three-dimensional life. She plays the no-nonsense character with crisp and unsentimental energy." Her delivery of the role was described as "stern and decisive."

Gillard-Rowlings adeptly transforms into Bennett before the audience’s very eyes. It’s a fine tribute to a remarkable woman and a priceless piece of Canadian history.

The show toured across Canada, the United States, Australia, England, Ireland and Scotland. In 2004, the show was performed at the Harlow Playhouse, at Memorial University's Harlow Campus where Gillard-Rowlings had studied for a semester as a student.

== Stratford Festival ==
Gillard-Rowlings worked for four seasons at the Stratford Festival in Stratford, Ontario, in a number of productions, including a role as one of Shakespeare's Weird Sisters in Macbeth, whom one reviewer described as "three of the most terrifying twisted sisters I've ever seen."

Another highlight in this production is most certainly the trio of Witches, or 'Weird Sisters' portrayed by Brigit Wilson, Deidre Gillard-Rowlings, and Lanise Antoine Shelley. They are captivating and terrifying.

In 2014, she was reported as saying,

“Stratford was intimidating at first but you have to be ready,” she said. “I’d been performing for 20 years but this was even more excitement and quite a prospect to be there among the greats. It makes you up your game. I thought I am going to run with these great horses so I brought my own expectations. This is a dream come true working with people I respect so much. It will make me a better artist."

== Select Credits ==
=== Stratford Festival credits ===
- Mother Courage and Her Children (2014)
- King John (2014)
- Antony and Cleopatra (2014)
- Oedipus Rex (2015)
- As You Like It (2016)
- Macbeth (2016)
- John Gabriel Borkman (2016)
- Treasure Island (2017)
- The Breathing Hole (2017)

=== Other Theatre Credits ===
- Rocking the Cradle – Tarragon Theatre/RCA Theatre
- How it Works – Prairie Theatre Exchange
- Stars in the Sky Morning – Bare Boards
- Marion Bridge – Bare Boards
- Kiss the Sun, Kiss the Moon – Western Canada Theatre
- The Bondagers – Two Planks and a Passion
- School for Clowns – Wonderbolt Circus
- The Servant of Two Masters – Wonderbolt Circus
- Salvage – The Story of a House – Artistic Fraud
- Taming of the Shrew – New Curtain Theatre
- Lion in the Streets – Grand Theatre
- Fly Me To The Moon (2016) – as Francis Shields – Grand Theatre
- Hunger (2019) – White Rooster Theatre

=== Film ===
- Grown Up Movie Star
- Hammer
- Heyday!
- Republic of Doyle – as Audrey (Season 3)
- The Adventures of Gary and Lou - as Beverly Wheeseltin and Frank the Fish
