= Deirdre Smeltzer =

American mathematician

Deirdre Longacher Smeltzer (born 1964) is an American mathematician, mathematics educator, textbook author, and academic administrator. A former professor, dean, and vice president at Eastern Mennonite University, she is Senior Director for Programs at the Mathematical Association of America.

== Education and career ==
Smeltzer was a mathematics major at Eastern Mennonite University, graduating in 1987 with a minor in Bible study. At Eastern Mennonite, mathematicians Millard Showalter and Del Snyder became faculty mentors, encouraging her to continue in advanced mathematics. She went on to graduate study in mathematics at the University of Virginia, earning a master's degree and completing her Ph.D. in 1994, with the dissertation Topics in Difference Sets in 2-Groups on difference sets in group theory, supervised by Harold Ward.

She became a faculty member at the University of St. Thomas, a Catholic university in Saint Paul, Minnesota, before returning to Eastern Mennonite University as a faculty member in 1998. She chaired the mathematical sciences department from 2005 to 2012. As an undergraduate at Eastern Mennonite, she had participated in a cross-cultural visit to China, and as a faculty member, she led another such visit in 2013, and became director of cross-cultural programs for the university. In 2013, she was named the university's vice president and undergraduate dean. In that position, she led the university's creation of new programs in political science and global studies, among others.

She stepped down from her administrative positions at Eastern Mennonite in 2019, and joined the Mathematical Association of America as Senior Director for Programs in 2020.

== Textbooks ==
Smeltzer is the coauthor of two undergraduate textbooks in mathematics: Methods for Euclidean Geometry (with Owen Byer and Felix Lazebnik, Mathematical Association of America, 2010) and Journey into Discrete Mathematics (with Owen Byer and Kenneth Wantz, MAA Press, 2018).
