= Deirdre Sullivan Beeman =

Surrealist and magical realist painter

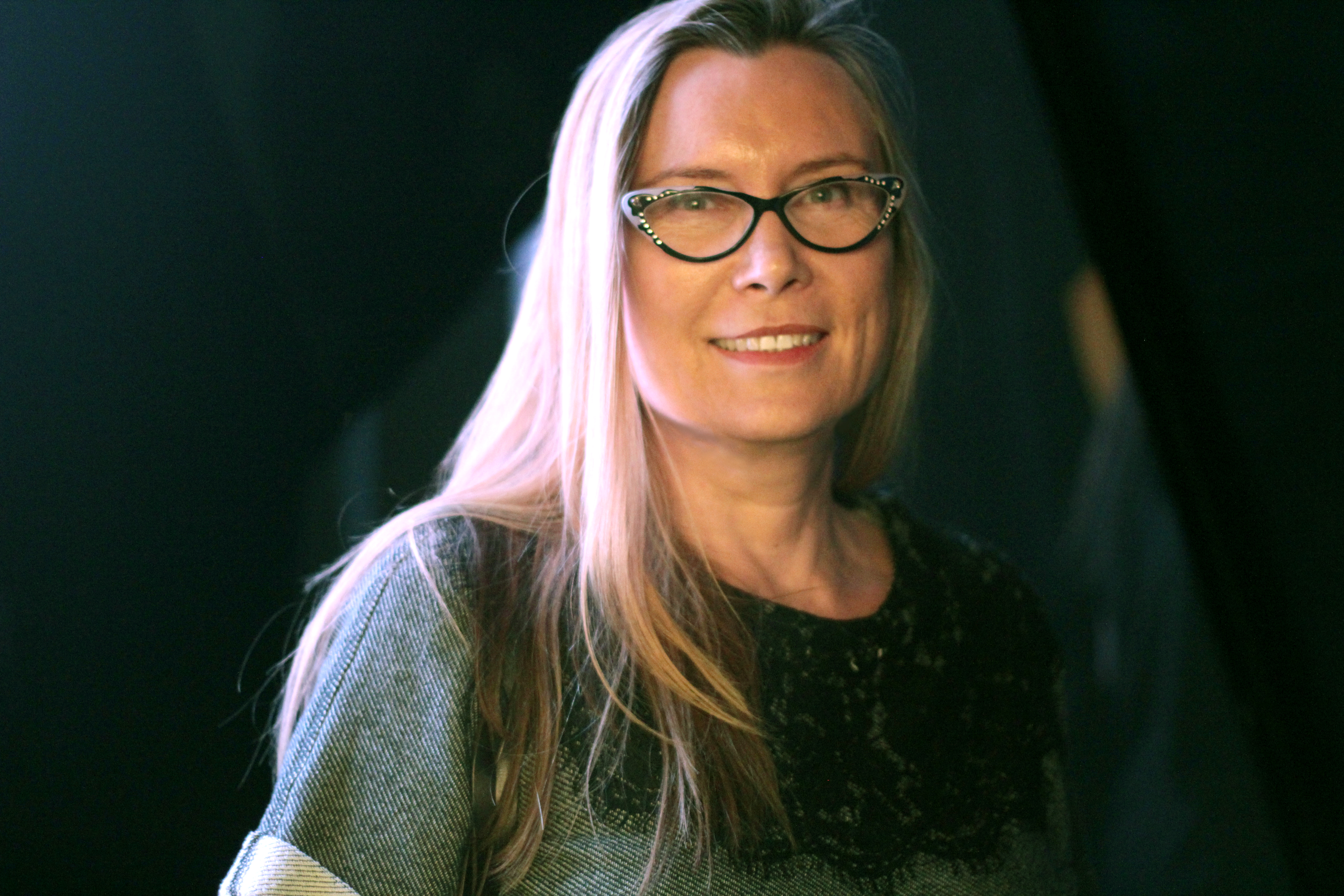
- Born: Cincinnati, Ohio, United States
- Known for: Painting, Magical Realism, Lowbrow Pop Surrealism, Installation Art
- Spouse: Greg Beeman (m. 1986)
- Website: sullivanbeeman.com

Deirdre Sullivan Beeman (née Deirdre Sullivan, Cincinnati, Ohio, United States) is an artist living and working in Los Angeles, California and Vancouver, Canada. She is a contemporary surrealist and magical realist painter whose work is born out of third wave feminism. She is best known for her use of the mische technique; combining egg tempera and oil paint.

== Paintings ==
Sullivan-Beeman’s work focuses on a central female figure which she denotes as a “heroine”, who is often accompanied by a force she calls a “daemon”, typified most frequently by an animal, or some other symbol of the natural world. The current environmental state of disarray informs her work; her view that “animals don’t often exist as equal partners in this big world” influences the nuance with which she includes animals as “sidekicks” to her heroine subjects. Sullivan-Beeman references her traditionalist Western painting style in the intellectual content of her works as well.

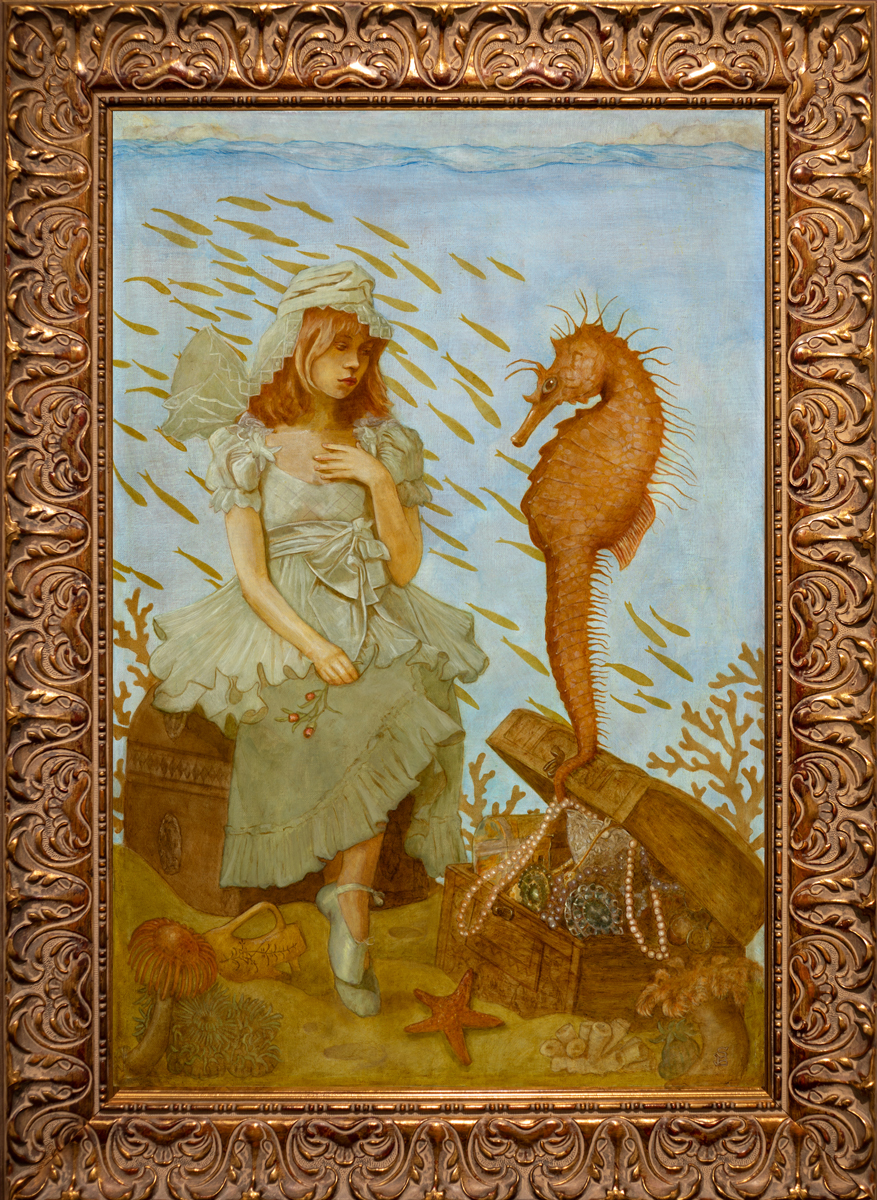
Deirdre Sullivan Beeman, Seahorse Girl, 2019, oil and egg tempera on linen panel 30 x 20 inches/76.2 x 50.8 cm, Private Collection.

For example, while her Long Ago Girl (2018) is painted in the mische technique and is represented wearing 18th century garments, she is also positioned in a protective manner reminiscent of and illusory to “historic images of the Madonna of Mercy, where humanity kneels under the cloak of the Virgin Mary”. Here, Sullivan-Beeman’s heroine is presented traditionally in terms of style and culture; she also draws on feminist ideals in that she posits the heroine as a protector figure of nature. The artist’s imagery is often pulled from the subconscious awareness of femininity; a dream journal functions as the conception place for much of her work. Her heroines and their positioning in the context of the painting are also highly symbolic of inner knowledge, worth, and discovery: in Seahorse Girl (2018), the seahorse is a symbol of the heroine’s “benevolent protection,” while the treasure chest bullion represents the heroine’s inner “fortitude, knowledge, and wisdom”.
