= Lafayette 148 =

American fashion house

- Industry: Fashion clothing
- Founded: 1996
- Founder: Deirdre Quinn, Shun Yen Siu and Ida Siu
- Headquarters: Brooklyn Navy Yard
- Website: www.lafayette148ny.com

Lafayette 148 is an American fashion house located in New York City. Originally launched in 1996 by Deirdre Quinn, Shun Yen Siu and Ida Siu, the brand produces women's clothing, footwear and accessories. It is a privately owned company.

== History ==
Lafayette 148 was co-founded by Deirdre Quinn, Shun Yen Siu, and Ida Siu. Quinn worked at Donna Karan while the Siu duo were clothing manufacturers in New York City. The company is named after its founding address in Manhattan’s SoHo neighborhood at 148 Lafayette Street.

In 2003, Lafayette 148 opened a design studio and production facility in Shantou, China. In August 2018, it moved its corporate headquarters to the Brooklyn Navy Yard, while operating the concept store at its founding address. Deirdre Quinn is the CEO of the brand.

As of July 2019, the company reported $200 million in revenue with the collection available in 400 stores in North America and China and 24 full-line stores worldwide. In September 2019, the company launched a boutique at Madison Avenue in New York City.

In April 2020, Lafayette 148 collaborated with the Brooklyn Navy Yard, the NY Economic Development Council (NYEDC) and defense supplier Crye Precision to manufacture surgical gowns for New York's front line medical workers during the coronavirus pandemic. In June 2020, Lafayette 148 launched AtelierDirect, a new division of the business providing private selling and styling services to its users in 25 markets in the US. In September 2020, the company introduced their footwear collection including all styles of shoes which are made in Spain with materials sourced from Italy. In late 2020, it opened new boutiques in Miami's Bal Harbour Shops and New Jersey's The Mall at Short Hills.

== Design ==
Creative Director Emily Smith is the head of design at Lafayette 148. The company is known for fine craftsmanship and clean-lined professional wear and sportswear with a modern, New York sensibility and made from high-quality European fabrics. Professional suiting, elevated essentials, leather and cashmere are all mainstays of the Lafayette 148 collection. Their products have been worn by Melinda Gates, Michelle Obama, Helen Mirren, Melissa McCarthy, Glenn Close, Oprah Winfrey and Kamala Harris.

== Corporate citizenship ==
Lafayette 148 philanthropic venture is the School of Dreams, a non-profit elementary school founded in China in 2007. As part of the company's second annual UnordinaryWomen initiative in 2020, Lafayette 148 honored changemaking women in support of Girl Rising, a non-profit organization for girls.
