= Remi Aubuchon =

American television writer and producer

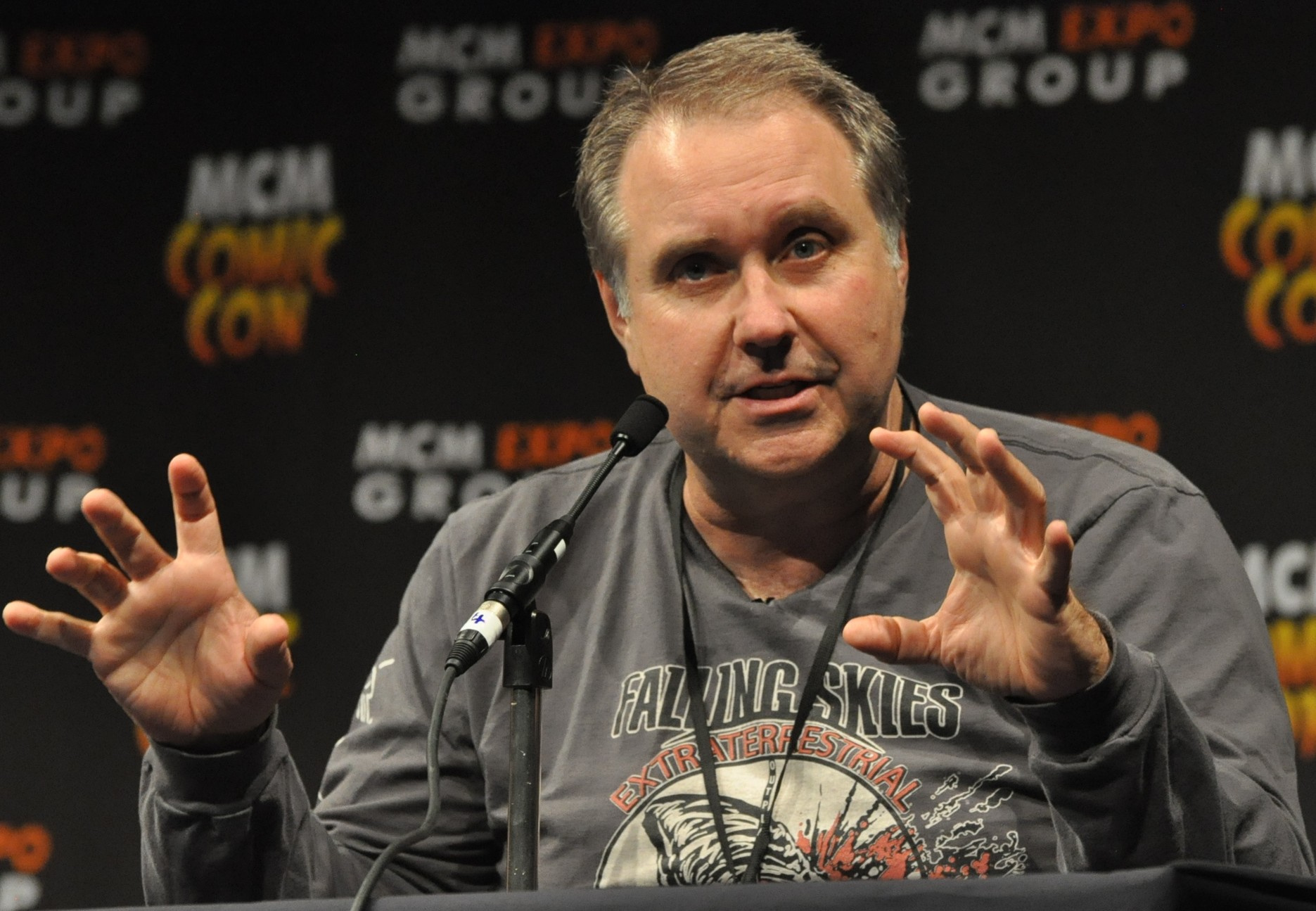
- Aubuchon at the 2013 MCMComicCon
- Occupations: Writer, producer
- Years active: 1983–present

Remi Aubuchon is an American television writer and producer, well known for his work on the Fox thriller 24 and the TNT alien-drama Falling Skies. He is the son of the late American actor Jacques Aubuchon. He was married to the American actress Joanna Lipari, with whom he has one child, Micheline.

== Career ==
As a theater director who trained under an American Film Institute Directors Fellowship, he has found himself in demand as a screenwriter. He wrote segments for HBO's miniseries From the Earth to the Moon, in which he appeared playing a small part as a Grumman engineer. He created, wrote, and produced the short-lived television series The Lyon's Den.

He served as an executive producer on Summerland, a co-executive producer and writer for the second season of 24, and is co-creator of the Battlestar Galactica prequel series Caprica. He wrote the pilot episode of Caprica, but left the series to become the showrunner of Persons Unknown. In March 2010, he joined the writing staff of Stargate Universe, for its second season.

In 2012, he joined the second season of the TNT science-fiction Falling Skies as writer, executive producer, and showrunner.
