= Molon Labe (Falling Skies) =

- Falling Skies episode
- Episode no.: Season 2 Episode 7
- Directed by: Holly Dale
- Written by: Bradley Thompson & David Weddle
- Production code: 207
- Original air date: July 22, 2012

Episode chronology
← Previous "Homecoming"	Next → "Death March"
- Falling Skies season 2

"Molon Labe" is the seventh episode of the second season of the American television drama series Falling Skies, and the 17th overall episode of the series. It originally aired on TNT in the United States on July 22, 2012. It was written by Bradley Thompson & David Weddle and directed by Holly Dale. The title is drawn from the defiant cry reportedly uttered by Sparta's King Leonidas I to Persians demanding that he surrenders his army's weapons, Molon labe ("Come and take it").

== Plot ==
Karen leads Ben into a trap so the Overlords can find out about the Skitter Resistance movement. Before Karen can place a harness on him, Tom and the Second Mass arrive and start a firefight. Karen manages to slip away but, in the confusion, Tom manages to point a gun at an Overlord, causing the enemy forces to stand down. Realizing the value of his target, Tom decides to take the Overlord prisoner and take the creature to Charleston.

Weaver resumes command and sends Matt along with Lourdes and Anne to get more supplies from the basement before they leave the hospital, with Matt along as security. Soon after the prisoner has been brought to base, the humans are attacked. Weaver realizes the frontal assault is a diversion and sends Tom to stop a mech that has sneaked through the back. While successful, the resulting explosion traps Anne, Lourdes and Matt in the basement. Karen then appears offering terms: Surrender the Overlord and everyone will be spared, though Tom and Hal don't buy this for a second. Ben and Tom argue over Ben's ultimate fate with the teen deciding to leave after this for the Second Mass' protection.

In the basement, Anne, Lourdes and Matt come across an injured Jamil who was sent to look for them. He has no signs of visible injuries but is hurt in a bad way and cautions them not to open the door opposite him. At the same time, Maggie and Hal are nearly attacked in the tunnels by a swarm of spider-like creatures seemingly sent by the aliens to force man's hand. In the meantime, Jamil is revealed to have been made into a "Trojan horse" as several creatures erupt from his body and chase Anne, Lourdes and Matt, trapping them in the blood lab. Matt is sent through the air vents by Anne to fetch help and narrowly avoids being eaten by the creatures thanks to being found by Tom and Pope and is pulled out in time. The basement is sealed off but since the creatures can eat through metal like rats this is only a temporary measure.

Karen appears again to tell the resistance it has run out of time and callously executes a captured fighter (Boon) to prove a point. An enraged Tom goes to confront the Overlord (the same one whom he spoke with on the ship) to demand answers. Through Ben the creature reveals that they're after something on Earth though it won't specify what and that the culling of humans was a favor. Humans are a weak self-destructive species that fights over dwindling resources and is ruled by emotions. To prove a point it begins to kill Ben through the link. Tom retaliates by shooting the alien in the neck leaving Anne to try to keep their only bargaining chip alive.

Weaver is furious at Tom's actions but admits if it was Jeannie in that situation he would have done the same. While still uncertain, both men realize Red Eye's claims about a skitter rebellion may be true. While the Overlords consider the resistance a minor irritant, the prospect of their own slaves starting an uprising has them rattled. This still doesn't change the fact that the resistance is trapped. Tom gets an idea and tells them to bring in Karen.

A smug Karen is brought in and gloats to Hal about how predictable the resistance is and how they fell for her ruse. Her attitude changes when presented with the injured Overlord and she has to be restrained to hear Tom's proposition: Let the humans leave and she gets her master back to treat. Though the aliens could blow them up with an air strike, Tom reveals they have wired the building with C4. The explosives are connected to a detonator that is with a hidden Pope and if he sees or gets word of trouble he will blow the building up, killing Karen and her master. The aliens are forced to agree with the resistance's demands.

Ben and Tom say tearful goodbyes on the road as the convoy stops for a rest/refuel. After Ben leaves on foot to join the skitter rebellion, the Second Mass begins the final leg of their journey to Charleston.

== Reception ==
=== Ratings ===
In its original American broadcast, "Molon Labe" was seen by an estimated 3.45 million household viewers, according to Nielsen Media Research. "Molon Labe" received a 1.2 rating among viewers between ages 18 and 49, meaning 1.2 percent of viewers in that age bracket watched the episode.

=== Reviews ===
Les Chappell of The A.V. Club gave the episode an A−, remarking that the series is strong when it "tries to be scary". He continued "Maybe Falling Skies will fall into the same potholes I’ve complained about repeatedly, but after "Molon Labe," I’m once again optimistic they might do better." Chris Carabott of IGN praised the episode and called it "easily the best episode of the season and could be considered one of the best of the series." He gave the episode a score of 9/10, an "amazing" rating.
