= John Dahl =

American film and television director and writer

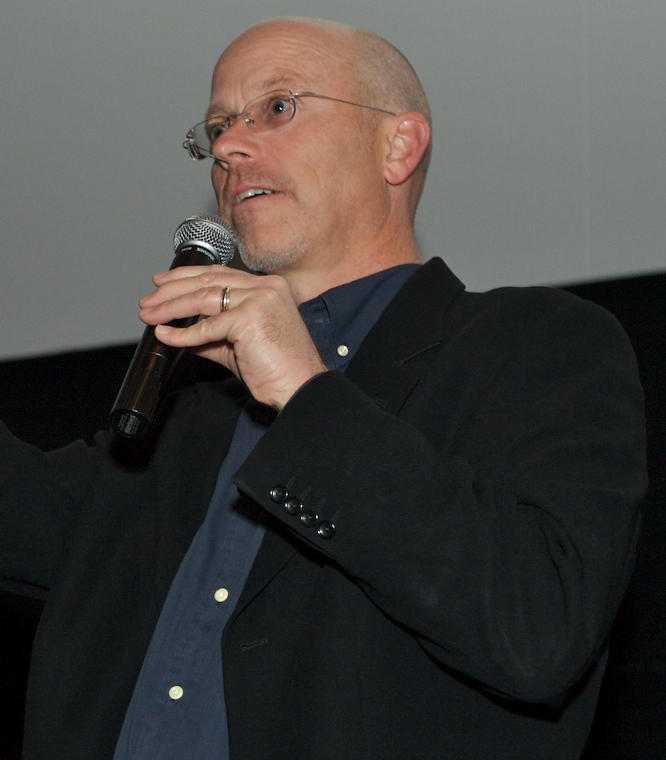
- Dahl at a screening for You Kill Me in San Francisco, California, June 14, 2007
- Born: June 15, 1956 (age 70); Billings, Montana, U.S.
- Education: Montana State University (BFA); American Film Institute (MFA)
- Occupations: Film director, television director, screenwriter
- Years active: 1989–present
- Spouse: Beth Friedberg
- Children: 4

John Dahl (born June 15, 1956) is an American film and television director and writer, best known for his neo-noir films from the early 1990s, Red Rock West and The Last Seduction, both of which are regarded as cult classics. After 2007's You Kill Me, Dahl moved from directing feature films into directing television series.

== Early life ==
John Dahl was born and raised in Billings, Montana, the second of four children (his brother is filmmaker Rick Dahl). Dahl's father worked as an insurance salesman, and his mother was a homemaker. He graduated from Billings Senior High School in 1974.

Dahl's interest in film began at the age of seventeen, when he first saw A Clockwork Orange at a Billings drive-in theater, as told to Robert K. Elder in an interview for The Film That Changed My Life.

This film captured my imagination so much. It was the first film that I saw that made me realize that somebody has to make this stuff. Somebody has to build those sets. Somebody has to paint those paintings. All of a sudden it became accessible. The movie was so compelling and interesting to me on so many levels. The one thing that struck me was that somebody made a movie, and that it was something that maybe, possibly, I could do.

He first attended the Montana State University, and then transferred to Montana State University's School of Film and Photography, where he received a degree in film. While at MSU, Dahl was a student of Bill Pullman. His first feature film at MSU was titled The Death Mutants made for $12,000. While at Montana State he played guitar in the punk rock band "The Pugs". He also met his wife, Beth Friedberg at MSU, and after graduation they both left Montana to attend the AFI Conservatory in Los Angeles.

== Career ==
Dahl moved to Los Angeles in 1982, beginning his career by drawing storyboards for music video directors. He would go on to work on feature films Robocop, Something Wild and Married to the Mob as a storyboard artist and assistant director. Dahl also directed multiple music videos, notably for Kool & the Gang and Joe Satriani.

Dahl's first work on a feature film was on 1987's crime thriller P.I. Private Investigations, which he wrote. The film did not achieve a cinema release. Dahl's first feature film as a director was 1989's noir thriller Kill Me Again, which he also wrote; the film was a box office failure which garnered mixed reviews. Dahl's second feature film was 1993's Red Rock West, which Dahl again wrote. Although the film achieved only a modest box office, it was a significant critical success with Roger Ebert describing it as "a diabolical movie that exists sneakily between a western and a thriller, between a film noir and a black comedy," and awarding the film three-and-a-half stars out of four.

Dahl followed up Red Rock West with another tale of greed and deceit, this time told from the female perspective, with a critically-acclaimed performance by Linda Fiorentino in 1994 crime thriller, The Last Seduction. Both Red Rock West and The Last Seduction were instant cult classics, however Dahl's hot streak ended with 1996's Unforgettable, starring Ray Liotta and Linda Fiorentino once more, which gained decidedly mixed reviews and was a box office bomb . Dahl rebounded from this disappointment with 1998's well-received crime drama film about the underground world of high-stakes poker, Rounders,starring Matt Damon and Edward Norton. Dahl followed this up with 2001's successful thriller Joy Ride. However, despite an apparent return to form, Dahl's 2005 The Great Raid attracted mixed reviews and failed at the box office. Although Dahl's 2007 You Kill Me attracted generally positive reviews, it again failed at the box office. You Kill Me is Dahl's last feature film to date, as after this he has pivoted to directing television shows.

In his career as a television director, Dahl has directed multiple shows, including Hannibal (TV series), and House of Cards.

== Personal life ==
Dahl and his wife, Beth, have four children, and live in Los Angeles.

== Filmography ==
=== Film ===
Year	Title	Director	Writer
1987	P.I. Private Investigations	No	Yes
1989	Kill Me Again	Yes	Yes
1993	Red Rock West	Yes	Yes
1994	The Last Seduction	Yes	No
1996	Unforgettable	Yes	No
1998	Rounders	Yes	No
2001	Joy Ride	Yes	No
2005	The Great Raid	Yes	No
2007	You Kill Me	Yes	No

=== Television ===
Year	Title	Notes
1995	Fallen Angels	Episode "Tomorrow I Die"
2005	Tilt	Episode "Shuffle Up and Deal"
2007	Life	Episode "Powerless"
2007–2014	Californication	10 episodes
2008–2010	True Blood	4 episodes
2008–2013	Dexter	16 episodes
2009	Fear Itself	Episode "Chance"
2009	Battlestar Galactica	Episode "The Oath"
2009	United States of Tara	2 episodes
2009	Breaking Bad	Episode "Down"
2009–2013	The Vampire Diaries	4 episodes
2010	Terriers	Episode "Agua Caliente"
2010	Caprica	2 episodes
2010–2011	Hellcats	2 episodes
2010–2015	Justified	6 episodes
2011–2012	Shameless	2 episodes
2012	Falling Skies	Episode "Love and Other Acts of Courage"
2012	Homeland	Episode "The Clearing"
2012	Arrow	Episode "Year's End"
2013	Person of Interest	Episode "Dead Reckoning"
2013–2014	The Americans	2 episodes
2013–2014	The Bridge	3 episodes
2013–2015	Hannibal	2 episodes
2013–2020	Ray Donovan	11 episodes
2014	Outlander	2 episodes
2014	The Strain	Episode "Loved Ones"
2015	House of Cards	2 episodes
2015	House of Lies	2 episodes
2015	Aquarius	Episode "It's Alright Ma. (I'm Only Bleeding.)"
2015	Jessica Jones	Episode "AKA Sin Bin"
2015–2017	The Affair	5 episodes
2016	Kingdom	2 episodes
2016–2020	Billions	4 episodes
2017	Iron Fist	2 episodes; also executive producer, 1 episode
2017	The Good Doctor	Episode "Oliver"
2017–2018	SEAL Team	2 episodes
2018	The Looming Tower	2 episodes
2019–2020	Yellowstone	4 episodes
2019	The Walking Dead	Episode "The World Before"
2019–2024	Evil	8 episodes
2019	For All Mankind	2 episodes
2020	Servant	Episode "Balloon"
2021	American Rust	5 episodes
2022	Super Pumped	2 episodes
2024	Manhunt	2 episodes
2025	Poker Face	Episode "Hometown Hero"
2026	M.I.A.	2 episodes
2026	Cupertino	Episode: "Juno"
