= Myra Bennett =

Canadian nurse

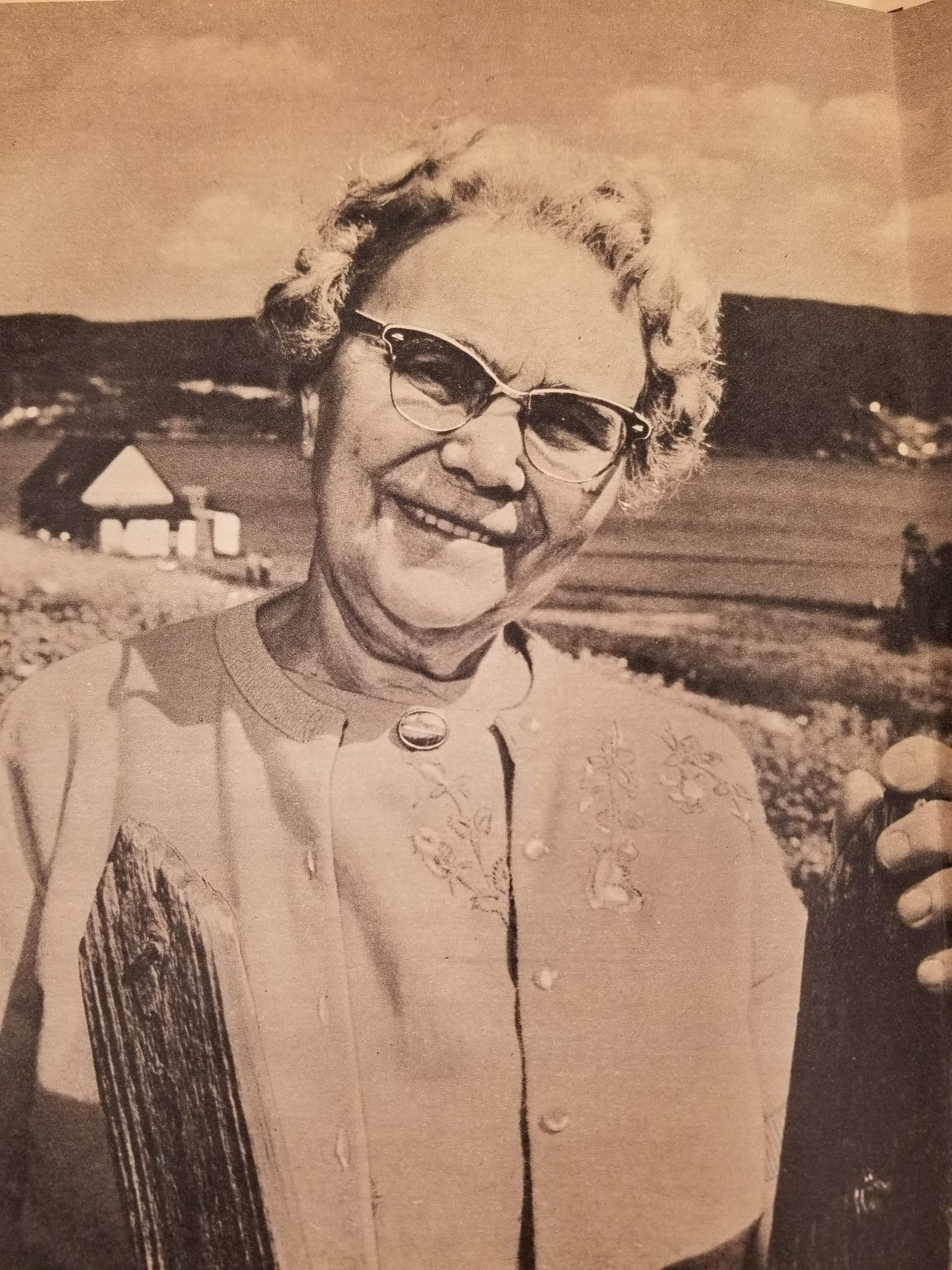
Nurse Bennett, age 75.

Myra M. Bennett, CM, MBE (April 1, 1890 – April 26, 1990) born London, England, died Daniel's Harbour, Newfoundland, Canada was a celebrated Canadian nurse. Dubbed The Florence Nightingale of Newfoundland by the Evening Telegram, in tribute to her contribution to the people of the Great Northern Peninsula, she was also known simply as The Nurse.

== Early life ==
Bennett (née Grimsley) worked as a tailor in London before training as a nurse at Woolwich during the first World War. She later studied midwifery at Clapham School of Midwifery. She came to Newfoundland as a district nurse under the outport nursing scheme. Her plan was to travel to Saskatchewan but was approached by Lady Harris (wife of Sir Alexander Harris) and was made aware of the dire need for nurses in Newfoundland. She agreed and changed her plans to go to Daniel's Harbour in May 1921, at the age of 31. She stayed in Daniel's Harbour and started a family.

== Career ==
Myra quickly gained experience caring for the sick on the west coast of Newfoundland. In these areas of Newfoundland (like Parsons Pond) there were no hospitals or doctors available. Myra often made news headlines, often referred to as "Nurse Bennett of the Outports". She was known for being especially passionate and resourceful in the rural areas in which she worked. There are stories recorded that show the great distances Bennett would travel to get to her patients. When the need for hospitals was clear to Bennett she transformed her house into a hospital with the help and support of her 3 kids and husband.

Her work in Newfoundland encouraged the construction of new hospitals in Bonne Bay, Port Saunders and St. Anthony's.

The house that she lived in at Daniel's Harbour is now a heritage site.

== Awards and honours ==
- 1935 - King George V Silver Jubilee Medal
- 1937 - King George VI Coronation Medal
- 1946 - Member of the Most Excellent Order of the British Empire
- 195? - Queen Elizabeth II Coronation Medal
- 1967 - Honorary membership in the Association for Registered Nurses of Newfoundland
- 1974 - Member of the Order of Canada
- 1974 - Doctor of Science, Honoris Causa, Memorial University of Newfoundland

== Legacy ==
- Bennett's life as a nurse in outport Newfoundland was written in an article by Reader's Digest and a book entitled Don't Have Your Baby in the Dory by H. Gordon Green.
- CBC TV also did a documentary on her life story, as well as, an interview with Peter Gzowski.
- She is also the subject of Robert Chafe's play Tempting Providence (Playwrights Canada Press, 2004).
- She tells stories of her time as a nurse in Weekend Magazine's article Nurse Bennett of The Outports by Cyril Robinson.

== See also ==
- List of people of Newfoundland and Labrador
- List of communities in Newfoundland and Labrador
