= Deirdre Hyde =

British painter (born 1953)

- Born: 1953 (age 72–73); Somerset, England
- Education: Fine Arts University of Reading
- Occupation: Artist

Deirdre Hyde (born 1953) is a British artist. She went to school in Sherborne 1963–1970. In 1975 she graduated in Fine Arts from University of Reading and in 1977 she obtained her Certificate of Education for the UK.

== Biography ==
Deirdre Hyde has painted continuously for the past forty years. Her work is in the permanent collections of the Smithsonian Institution, National Geographic Society, Frank Gehry's Biomuseo in Panama, Canning House among others.

In her twenties, she was inspired by the adventurous tradition of Maria Sibylla Merian, Emilio Spann, Frederick Catherwood, Margaret Mee and Marianne North. She has spent 40 years chronicling the threatened nature of Central America. Her work has been reproduced in museums and publications throughout Europe and the Americas from Norway to Brazil.

== Work and experience ==
=== Work life ===
1979–2000 for parks Services in Costa Rica, Nicaragua, Panama, and Belize (WWF), Guatemala (IUCN), El Salvador (USAID), Brazil and Mexico (Smithsonian Institution), Guyana (Conservation International) Cape Verde and Spain. Illustration work has appeared in publications worldwide, notably for National Geographic Society, Rainforest Alliance and Scholastic Publishers. 1997–2001 worked as artist in residence at Abruzzo National Park in Italy.
