= Deirdre Breakenridge =

American author and businessperson

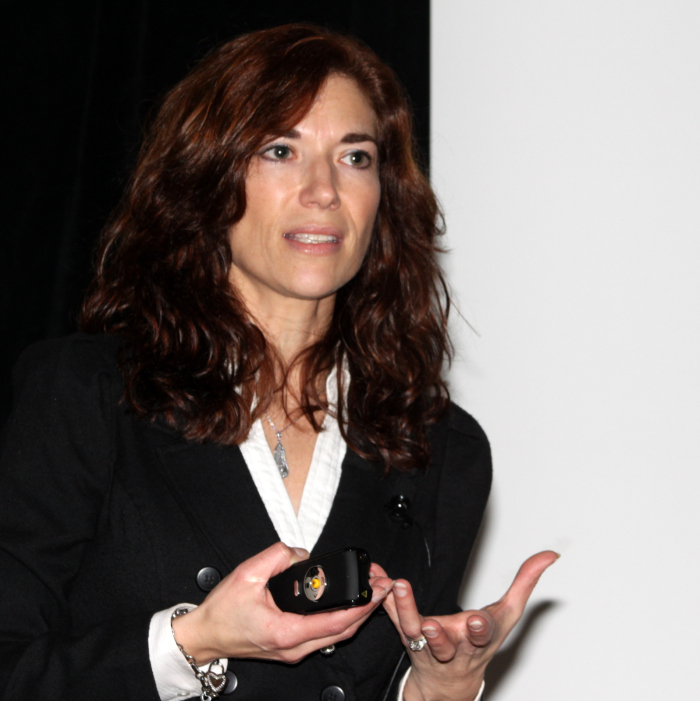
- Born: 1966 (age 59–60)
- Education: Glassboro State College; Fairleigh Dickinson University (MBA)
- Occupations: Author, businessperson
- Website: deirdrebreakenridge.com

Deirdre K. Breakenridge (/ˈdɪərdrə ˈbrɛkənrɪdʒ/ DEER-drə BREK-ən-rij; born 1966) is an American author and businessperson. She is known for her writing on public relations and social media.

== Education and career ==
Breakenridge grew up in New Jersey, and she attended Glassboro State College. After working in the public relations industry, she returned to the Fairleigh Dickinson University to get her MBA. Afterward, she continued working in public relations agencies before opening her own agency, Pure Performance Communications. She has also taught classes at several universities as an adjunct professor.

== Work ==
Breakenridge's first book, Cyberbranding: Brand Building in the Digital Economy (2001), is about how companies can market their brand online. Her 2008 book, PR 2.0 New Media, New Tools, New Audiences, offers public relations groups a way to get involved online in new technologies.

In 2009, Breakenridge published Putting the Public Back in Public Relations with Brian Solis. The Journalism and Mass Communication Educator wrote that the book is useful and well-organized for both beginners and advanced individuals in public relations. The book also describes new trends in social media and how all PR individuals can use these techniques. Putting the Public Back in Public Relations also advises those in PR positions to take on leadership roles to promote the use of the new techniques described in the book.

Breakenridge has also worked on research, such as "Social Media Comes of Age: The Vocus 2011 Planning Survey," which she produced with Vocus in 2010.

== Books ==
- Breakenridge, Deirdre (2001). Cyberbranding: Brand Building in the Digital Economy. Financial Times Prentice Hall. ISBN 9780130897107.
- Breakenridge, Deirdre; Cini, Joanne; DeLoughry, Thomas J. (2003). The New PR Toolkit: Strategies for Successful Media Relations. FT Press. ISBN 9780130090256.
- Breakenridge, Deirdre K. (2008). PR 2.0: New Media, New Tools, New Audiences. FT Press. ISBN 9780132703970.
- Solis, Brian; Breakenridge, Deirdre K. (2009). Social Networking for Promoting YOU as a Brand. FT Press. ISBN 9780131377738.
- Solis, Brian; Breakenridge, Deirdre K. (2009). Putting the Public Back in Public Relations: How Social Media Is Reinventing the Aging Business of PR. FT Press. ISBN 9780137011261.
- Breakenridge, Deirdre K.; Solis, Brian (2012). Powerful PR Strategies for Success (Collection). FT Press. ISBN 9780133087307.
- Breakenridge, Deirdre K. (2012). Social Media and Public Relations: Eight New Practices for the PR Professional. FT Press. ISBN 9780132983228.
- Breakenridge, Deirdre (2017). Answers for Modern Communicators: A Guide to Effective Business Communication. Routledge. ISBN 9781351863001.
