= Deirdre Costello =

Personal information
- Native name: Deirdre Ní Choisteala (Irish)
- Born: Ireland

Sport
- Sport: Camogie
Inter-county
- Years: County
- Galway

Deirdre Costello is a former camogie player, winner of an All-Ireland Senior Camogie Championship when Galway won its first senior championship in 1996, and winner of the AIB Gaelic Star award for Camogie Junior Player of the year in 1985.

She won three All Ireland medals at different grades in 1985, scoring four goals for Galway in the All Ireland Junior Championship final against Armagh in September, scoring 3–5 for St Raphael's Loughrea whom she captained to victory against Loreto, in the All Ireland Colleges Camogie Championship final in March 1985, and winning a National Junior League medal with Galway in May of the same year. She finished second in the Gradam Taillte skills competition and scored 2–1 in the All Ireland minor final against Cork, in which Galway were defeated. She played for Connacht in both the junior and senior finals of the 1985 Gael Linn Cup, scoring a goal in the senior final.
