= Habartice (Jindřichov) =

Village in the Czech Republic

Coordinates: 50°6′36″N 16°57′27″E

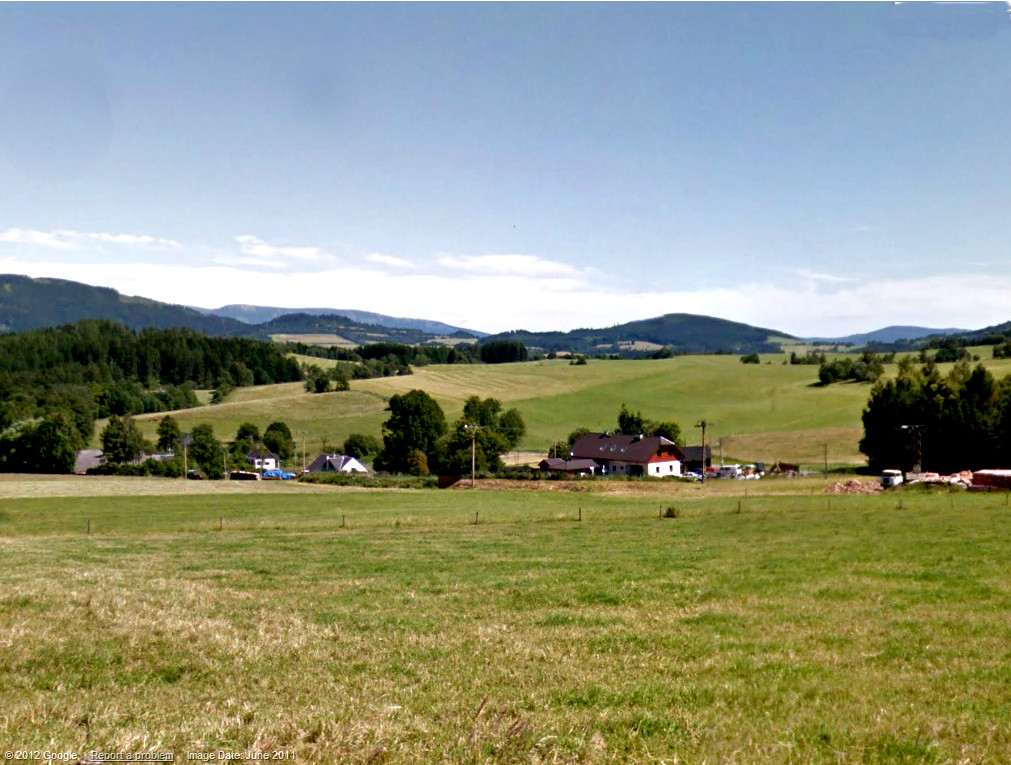
Habartice

Habartice (German: Ebersdorf) is a village and administrative part of Jindřichov in Šumperk District in the Olomouc Region of the Czech Republic.

== Etymology ==
An original German name is created from name of its founder who was Eberhart and means "Eber's village". Czech name is a loan translation.

== History ==
The village was founded by Germans. The first written mention is from 1351. It was a part of Third Reich during World War II. Ethnic Germans were expelled after the war and the village was repopulated by Czechs.

== Geography and transport ==
Habartice is situated in upland meadows of Hanušovická vrchovina which are used for grazing. Direct road connection is available to Hanušovice, Jindřichov and Staré Město.
