= Jindřichov (Šumperk District) =

- Municipality
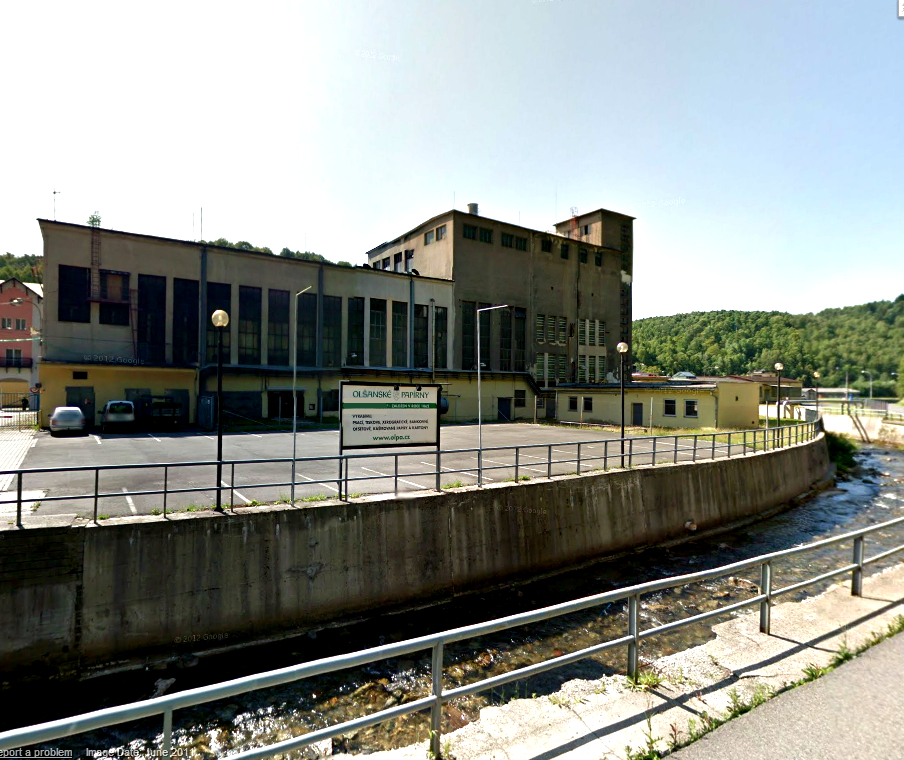
- Paper mill

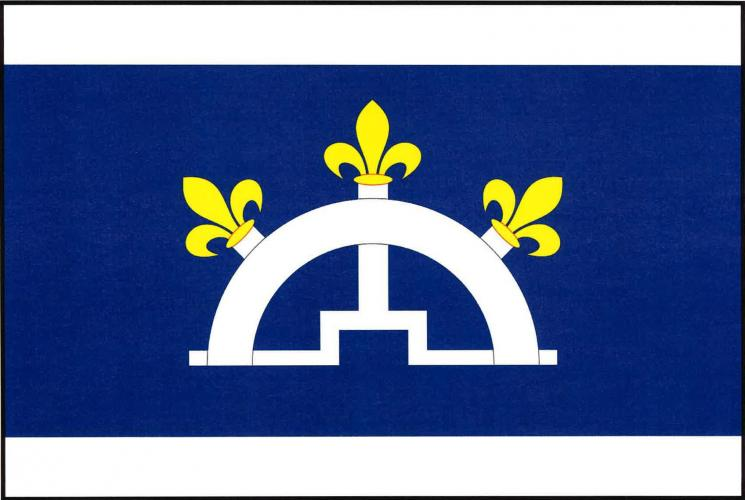
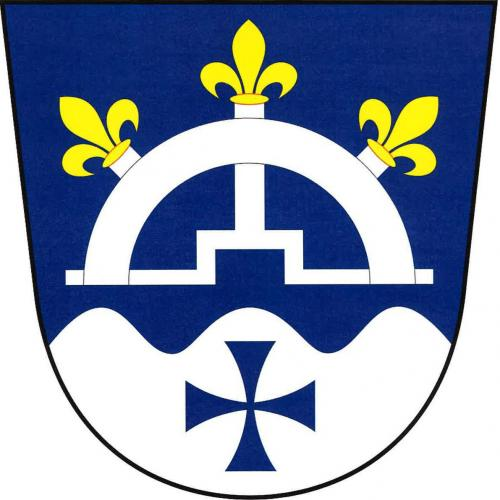
- Flag Coat of arms

- Location in the Czech Republic
- Coordinates: 50°5′45″N 16°59′6″E
- Country: Czech Republic
- Region: Olomouc
- District: Šumperk
- Founded: 1953

Area
  - Total: 51.70 km^{2} (19.96 sq mi)
- Elevation: 460 m (1,510 ft)

Population (2026-01-01)
  - Total: 1,087
  - Density: 21.03/km^{2} (54.45/sq mi)
- Time zone: UTC+1 (CET)
  - Summer (DST): UTC+2 (CEST)
- Postal code: 788 23
- Website: www.jindrichovsu.cz

Jindřichov (German: Heinrichsthal) is a municipality and village in Šumperk District in the Olomouc Region of the Czech Republic. It has about 1,100 inhabitants.

== Administrative division ==
Jindřichov consists of four municipal parts (in brackets population according to the 2021 census):

- Jindřichov (697)
- Habartice (68)
- Nové Losiny (124)
- Pusté Žibřidovice (155)

== Etymology ==
The municipality is named after Heinrich (Czech: Jindřich) Kaiser, the second owner of the local paper mill.

== Geography ==
Jindřichov is located about 14 kilometres (9 mi) north of Šumperk and 59 km (37 mi) north of Olomouc. The southwestern part of the municipal territory with the built-up area lies in the Hanušovice Highlands. The northeastern part of extends into the Hrubý Jeseník mountain range and includes the highest point of Jindřichov, a contour line below the summit of the mountain Vozka at 1,358 m (4,455 ft) above sea level. The village of Jindřichov is situated in a narrow valley of the Branná River.

== History ==
Jindřichov is a young municipality founded in 1953. The municipality was created by merger of Pusté Žibřidovice with hamlets of Pleče, Pekařov, Sklenná, and with parts of Hanušovice, Vikantice and Nové Losiny. In 1976 Habartov and Nové Losiny were joined to Jindřichov.

Habartice is the oldest part of the municipality as it was first mentioned in 1351. Pusté Žibřidovice was first mentioned in 1382.

The history of Jindřichov began in 1862, when a paper mill and an apartment building for workers were built. An investor was Joseph Abraham Winternitz, who sold it to Heinrich Kaiser in 1864.

The railway access with rest of Austria-Hungary was opened in 1888 as well as an access with Prussia via Głuchołazy. The factory further grew up and in 1927, it had 800 employees.

== Demographics ==
Historical population

Year	Pop.	±%
1869	2,974	—
1880	3,129	+5.2%
1890	3,262	+4.3%
1900	3,240	−0.7%
1910	3,349	+3.4%

Year	Pop.	±%
1921	2,986	−10.8%
1930	3,228	+8.1%
1950	1,572	−51.3%
1961	1,944	+23.7%
1970	1,700	−12.6%

Year	Pop.	±%
1980	1,483	−12.8%
1991	1,309	−11.7%
2001	1,403	+7.2%
2011	1,241	−11.5%
2021	1,044	−15.9%

Source: Censuses

== Economy ==
The economy of the village has always been connected with the paper mill, which employed more than 200 people. The factory's bankruptcy in 2008 caused a high unemployment rate, which was about 30% in 2012. In 2016, the intention to convert the former paper mill into a waste sorting line was introduced.

== Transport ==
Jindřichov is located on the railway line of regional importance leading from Jeseník to Ruda nad Moravou, which further continues to Zábřeh or Šumperk.

== Sights ==
The Church of Saint Mary Magdalene is located in Pusté Žibřidovice. It is a valuable Baroque building, built in 1735.

The Church of Saint Isidore is the main landmark of Nové Losiny. It was built in the Neoclassical style.
