= Lee Samuel Finn =

American astrophysicist

Lee Samuel Finn is an American astrophysicist, former professor of physics, astronomy and astrophysics and former director of the Center for Gravitational Wave Physics at Pennsylvania State University. His research interests are in gravitational wave astronomy.

He is a Fellow of the American Physical Society (2002) , a member of the American Astronomical Society, the Association for Computing Machinery, and the Society for Industrial and Applied Mathematics.

Lee Samuel Finn was the founding Field Chief Editor of the peer-reviewed journal Frontiers in Astronomy and Space Sciences, and Specialty Chief Editor for its Cosmology section, in which roles he served from the journal's founding until mid-2018.

According to NASA ADS, as of November 2024 his h index is 89, with 56,583 refereed citations. As of November 2014 his tori index is 33.5, and his riq index is 193.
