= Deirdre Quinn (entrepreneur) =

American businesswoman

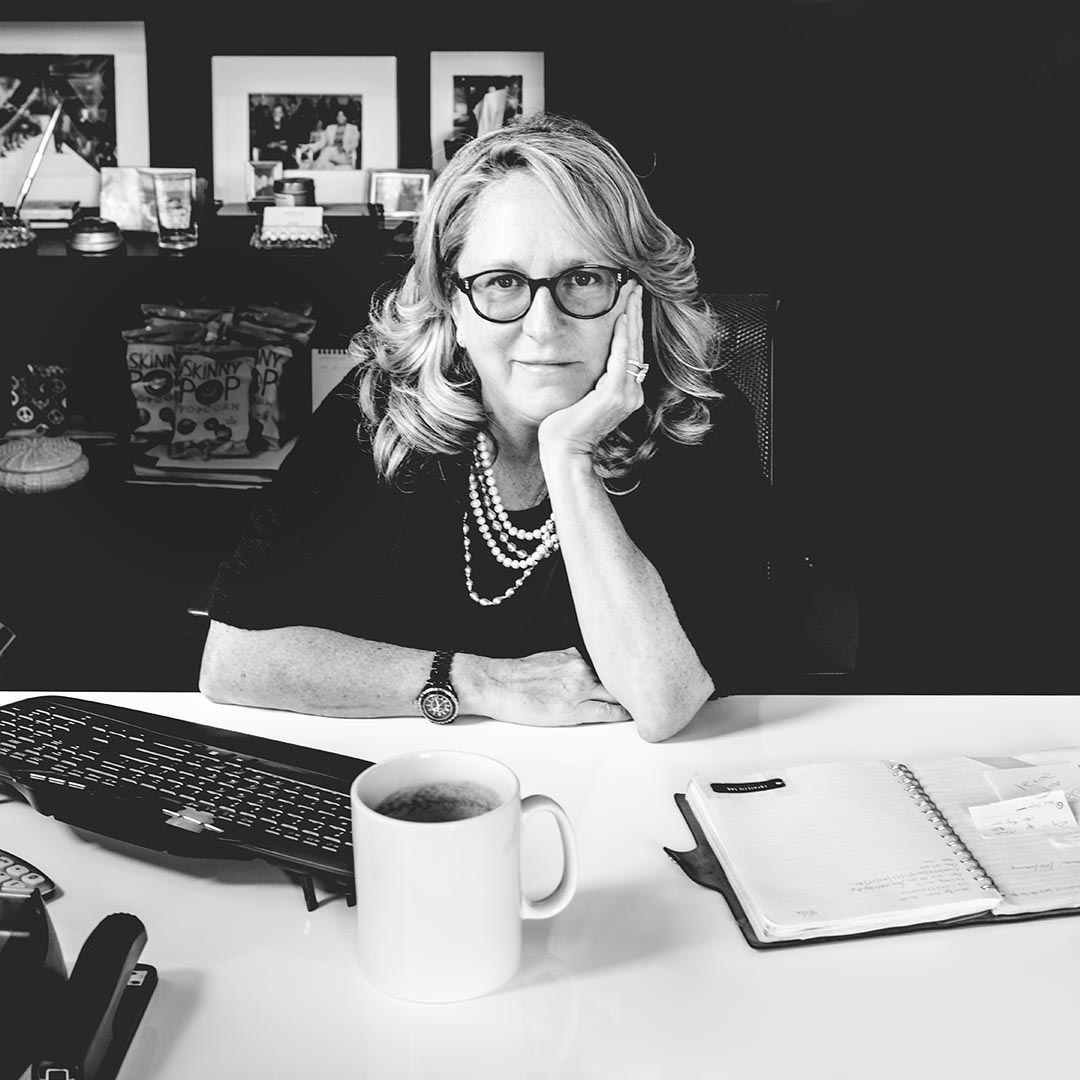
- Occupation: Businesswoman
- Years active: 1982–present
- Known for: Lafayette 148 New York
- Awards: Ernst & Young Entrepreneur of the Year Award

Deirdre Quinn is an American businesswoman. She is the co-founder and CEO of Lafayette 148, a New York-based fashion house. She is also the 2016 Ernst & Young Entrepreneur of the Year Award recipient.

== Biography ==
Deirdre Quinn grew up in Cresskill, New Jersey, as the daughter of Irish immigrants. She studied fashion design in college in Miami, Florida. She began her fashion career with Liz Claiborne, becoming vice president of operations at the age of 28. Subsequently she held executive roles at Donna Karan and Escada. She has travelled to over 70 countries as part of her work.

In 1996, Quinn established Lafayette 148, a women’s fashion brand, with Shen Yen Siu and Ida Siu. With the help of the Sius, Quinn set up a manufacturing facility in China in 2002. When Shen Yen Siu died in 2013, Quinn assumed the role of CEO of the company. Under her leadership, the company has reported a revenue of $200 million as of July 2019 with the collection available in 400 stores in North America and China. During the coronavirus outbreak in 2020, she led her company’s partnership with the Brooklyn Navy Yard and the NY Economic Development Council (NYEDC) to design and sew PPE gowns for local hospitals.

Quinn is a trustee of the Fashion Institute of Technology, an associate partner with the Partnership for NYC and is a member of C200, a women’s executive leadership organization. She has actively supported charities that target Alzheimer's disease, due to one of her parents being diagnosed with the condition. She has also served as a board member for the School of Dreams, a subsidized private school for elementary-aged children in Shantou. The school is funded by Lafayette 148. She is also a Board of Trustee at The Brooklyn Hospital Center.

== Recognition ==
In 2016, Quinn received the E&Y New York Entrepreneur Award. In 2018, she was honored by Fashion Group International with their Corporate Leadership Award. That same year, she was also a recipient of an Elly Award.
