= Deirdre FitzGerald =

Australian lawyer

Deirdre FitzGerald (nee Moriarty) (born 1936) is an Australian lawyer. She formed the first female law partnership in Melbourne, was the first Registrar of the Family Court of Australia and was the first chairperson of the Victorian Equal Opportunity Board.

FitzGerald was born in Kew in Melbourne, and her family moved to a farm at Mount Evelyn during World War II. She was educated at the Mount Lilydale Convent before receiving a Commonwealth scholarship to the University of Melbourne, where she graduated in law in 1957. She worked for two firms of solicitors, practising in probate, conveyancing and commercial law. In 1962, a fellow woman graduate, Lillian Cooney, inherited her father's law practice upon his death, and invited FitzGerald to join her in the partnership of Gill Kane. They formed the first female law partnership in the city of Melbourne. Their practice grew by the mid-1960s to have a staff of about a dozen, including "only one or two" male solicitors. By the early 1970s, they had a staff of about thirty and had acquired practices at Dandenong and Oakleigh. Fitzgerald left the practice in the mid-1970s amidst more challenging economic times. She was president of the Women Lawyers Association for two years and was the first woman representative on the Council of the Law Institute of Victoria. In 1975, FitzGerald was employed as the first Deputy Registrar (later named Registrar) of the new Family Court of Australia. She faced major administrative challenges, both in being part of a new court and in interpreting the landmark Family Law Act 1975, which marked drastic changes in family law with the introduction of no-fault divorce. She married Leo FitzGerald in 1975. She wrote that she became a "technical interpreter and adviser" to members of the legal profession, and oversaw conciliation conferences and financial hearings. In the late 1970s, she was invited to apply for the position of inaugural Chairman of the Victorian Equal Opportunity Board, and was responsible for setting up the organisation and defining its structure. She retired from the Board in 1980. Later, she was a member of the Veterans Review Board from its creation in 1985 until 1989 and a senior member of the Social Security Appeals Tribunal from 1989 to 1997.
