= Greg Beeman =

American director and producer

- Born: 1962 (age 63–64); Honolulu, Hawaii, US
- Other name: Gregory Beeman
- Occupations: Director and producer
- Years active: 1986–present
- Spouse: Deirdre Sullivan Beeman (m. 1986)

Greg Beeman (born 1962 in Honolulu, Hawaii) is an American film and television director and producer and winner of the Directors Guild of America award for Outstanding Directorial Achievement in Children's Programs.

He is known for his work on the television series JAG, Smallville, and Heroes. Beeman worked on the TNT apocalyptic/science-fiction series Falling Skies, as executive producer and main director.

== Career ==
Beeman started his directorial career in the late 1980s, guest directing for the television show The Wonder Years, and directing two television films. In 1988, Beeman made his theatrical directing debut in License to Drive. During the early 1990s, Beeman continued work in the television industry, directing episodes of JAG, Harts of the West, Danger Theatre, and Nash Bridges. Beeman also contributed two episodes to the sci-fi series Eerie, Indiana. Beeman would work on numerous television projects during the late 1990s, most notably as a recurring director on television series JAG.

In 2000, Beeman won a Directors Guild of America award for Outstanding Directorial Achievement in Children's Programs for the television film Miracle in Lane 2. The next year, he came on board The WB super-hero series Smallville, as a director and co-executive producer. He later was promoted to executive producer and directed the show's series finale. In 2003, Beeman was again nominated for a Directors Guild of America award for Outstanding Directorial Achievement in Children's Programs for the television adaptation of A Ring of Endless Light.

In 2006, he became a co-executive producer and director on the NBC series Heroes. He would later be promoted to executive producer. Heroes was nominated for a Hugo Award for Best Dramatic Presentation - Long Form in 2008. Beeman and fellow Heroes' producers were nominated for a PGA Award in the same year. In 2009, he joined The CW drama Melrose Place, as a director and executive producer. Beeman boarded the TNT science-fiction/action series Falling Skies, as a director and co-executive producer in 2011. In the show's second season, Beeman served as executive producer and primary director. For the TV series Minority Report and American Gothic, Beeman directed as well as acting as co-executive producer.

== Filmography ==
=== Feature ===
Year	Title	Director	Writer	Notes
1988	License to Drive	Yes	No	
1990	Tales of the Unknown	Yes	Yes	"The Big Garage"
1992	Mom and Dad Save the World	Yes	No	
1995	Bushwhacked	Yes	No	

=== Television ===
TV movies

Year	Title	Director	Producer
1986	The Richest Cat in the World	Yes	No
1986	Little Spies	Yes	No
1995	Problem Child 3: Junior in Love	Yes	No
1997	Under Wraps	Yes	No
1998	Brink!	Yes	No
1999	Horse Sense	Yes	Yes
2000	Miracle in Lane 2	Yes	Yes
2000	The Ultimate Christmas Present	Yes	No
2002	A Ring of Endless Light	Yes	No

TV series

Year	Title	Director	Producer	Notes
1988–1993	The Wonder Years	Yes	No	3 episodes
1991–1992	Eerie, Indiana	Yes	No	1 episode
1993–1994	The Adventures of Brisco County, Jr.	Yes	No	1 episode
1993–1994	Harts of the West	Yes	No	2 episodes
1995–1996	Nowhere Man	Yes	No	1 episode
1995–1996	Strange Luck	Yes	No	2 episodes
1995–2005	JAG	Yes	No	11 episodes
1996–1999	The Sentinel	Yes	No	
1996–2001	Nash Bridges	Yes	Yes	18 episodes
1998–2000	Martial Law	Yes	No	4 episodes
1999–2000	The Strip	Yes	No	
1999–2002	Providence	Yes	No	2 episodes
2000	I Spike	Yes	No	
2000	City of Angels	Yes	No	
2000	Secret Agent Man	Yes	No	1 episode
2001–2002	Philly	Yes	No	1 episode
2001–2011	Smallville	Yes	Executive	105 episodes
2006–2010	Heroes	Yes	Executive	58 episodes
2007	Aquaman	Yes	No	pilot
2009–2010	Melrose Place	Yes	Executive	16 episodes
2010	Rizzoli & Isles	Yes	No	1 episode
2010	Blue Bloods	Yes	No	1 episode
2010–2011	The Defenders	Yes	No	1 episode
2010–2011	No Ordinary Family	Yes	No	1 episode
2010–2011	Memphis Beat	Yes	No	1 episode
2011	Falling Skies	Yes	Executive	17 episodes
2011	Once Upon a Time	Yes	No	1 episode
2012–2013	Touch	Yes	No	1 episode
2012–2013	Vegas	Yes	No	1 episode
2012–2014	Perception	Yes	No	6 episodes
2014	The Last Ship	Yes	No	1 episode
2015–2016	Heroes Reborn	Yes	No	2 episodes
2015–2017	Lucifer	Yes	No	4 episodes
2015	Minority Report	Yes	Executive	6 episodes
2016	American Gothic	Yes	Executive	13 episodes
2017	No Tomorrow	Yes	No	1 episode
2017	Zoo	Yes	No	1 episode
2017	Salvation	Yes	No	1 episode
2017	Midnight, Texas	Yes	No	1 episode
2017–2019	S.W.A.T.	Yes	No	2 episodes
2018	The Rookie	Yes	No	1 episode
2019	Charmed	Yes	No	1 episode
2019	Swamp Thing	Yes	No	1 episode
2020	Nancy Drew	Yes	No	1 episode
2020–2021	Batwoman	Yes	No	2 episodes
2020–2021	Stargirl	Yes	No	4 episodes
2021	The Mysterious Benedict Society	Yes	No	1 episode
2022	The Flash	Yes	No	1 episode
