= List of Falling Skies episodes =

Falling Skies, a post-apocalyptic drama television series premiered on June 19, 2011, in the United States on TNT, and concluded August 30, 2015, after 52 episodes over 5 seasons. Created by Robert Rodat, the series follows Tom Mason (Noah Wyle), a former Boston University history professor who becomes the second-in-command of the 2nd Massachusetts Militia Regiment, a group of civilians and fighters fleeing post-apocalyptic Boston. The show is produced by DreamWorks Television, with Steven Spielberg acting as an executive producer.

== Series overview ==
Season	Episodes	Originally released	
Season	Episodes	First released	Last released
1	10	June 19, 2011	August 7, 2011
2	10	June 17, 2012	August 19, 2012
3	10	June 9, 2013	August 4, 2013
4	12	June 22, 2014	August 31, 2014
5	10	June 28, 2015	August 30, 2015

== Episodes ==
=== Season 1 (2011) ===
No. overall	No. in season	Title	Directed by	Written by	Original release date	US viewers (millions)
1	1	"Live and Learn"	Carl Franklin	Robert Rodat	June 19, 2011	5.91
2	2	"The Armory"	Greg Beeman	Graham Yost	June 19, 2011	5.91
3	3	"Prisoner of War"	Greg Beeman	Fred Golan	June 26, 2011	4.20
4	4	"Grace"	Fred Toye	Melinda Hsu Taylor	July 3, 2011	4.07
5	5	"Silent Kill"	Fred Toye	Joe Weisberg	July 10, 2011	3.90
6	6	"Sanctuary (Part 1)"	Sergio Mimica-Gezzan	Joel Anderson Thompson	July 17, 2011	4.27
7	7	"Sanctuary (Part 2)"	Sergio Mimica-Gezzan	Melinda Hsu Taylor	July 24, 2011	4.07
8	8	"What Hides Beneath"	Anthony Hemingway	Mark Verheiden	July 31, 2011	4.31
9	9	"Mutiny"	Holly Dale	Joe Weisberg	August 7, 2011	5.70
10	10	"Eight Hours"	Greg Beeman	Mark Verheiden	August 7, 2011	5.54

=== Season 2 (2012) ===
No. overall	No. in season	Title	Directed by	Written by	Original release date	US viewers (millions)
11	1	"Worlds Apart"	Greg Beeman	Mark Verheiden	June 17, 2012	4.46
12	2	"Shall We Gather at the River"	Greg Beeman	Bradley Thompson & David Weddle	June 17, 2012	4.46
13	3	"Compass"	Michael Katleman	Bryan Oh	June 24, 2012	3.81
14	4	"Young Bloods"	Miguel Sapochnik	Heather V. Regnier	July 1, 2012	3.39
15	5	"Love and Other Acts of Courage"	John Dahl	Joe Weisberg	July 8, 2012	3.64
16	6	"Homecoming"	Greg Beeman	Bryan Oh	July 15, 2012	3.61
17	7	"Molon Labe"	Holly Dale	Bradley Thompson & David Weddle	July 22, 2012	3.45
18	8	"Death March"	Seith Mann	Heather V. Regnier	August 5, 2012	3.34
19	9	"The Price of Greatness"	Adam Kane	Mark Verheiden	August 12, 2012	3.46
20	10	"A More Perfect Union"	Greg Beeman	Remi Aubuchon and Bradley Thompson & David Weddle	August 19, 2012	3.84

=== Season 3 (2013) ===
No. overall	No. in season	Title	Directed by	Written by	Original release date	US viewers (millions)
21	1	"On Thin Ice"	Greg Beeman	Remi Aubuchon	June 9, 2013	4.21
22	2	"Collateral Damage"	James Marshall	Bradley Thompson & David Weddle	June 9, 2013	4.21
23	3	"Badlands"	David Solomon	John Wirth	June 16, 2013	2.79
24	4	"At All Costs"	Greg Beeman	Heather V. Regnier	June 23, 2013	3.55
25	5	"Search and Recovery"	Sergio Mimica-Gezzan	Jordan Rosenberg	June 30, 2013	3.22
26	6	"Be Silent and Come Out"	Adam Kane	Bradley Thompson & David Weddle & John Wirth	July 7, 2013	3.49
27	7	"The Pickett Line"	Sergio Mimica-Gezzan	Heather V. Regnier & Jordan Rosenberg	July 14, 2013	3.33
28	8	"Strange Brew"	David Solomon	John Wirth	July 21, 2013	3.74
29	9	"Journey to Xibalba"	Jonathan Frakes	Bradley Thompson & David Weddle	July 28, 2013	3.06
30	10	"Brazil"	Greg Beeman	Remi Aubuchon	August 4, 2013	3.74

=== Season 4 (2014) ===
No. overall	No. in season	Title	Directed by	Written by	Original release date	US viewers (millions)
31	1	"Ghost in the Machine"	Greg Beeman	David Eick	June 22, 2014	3.67
32	2	"The Eye"	Sergio Mimica-Gezzan	Carol Barbee	June 29, 2014	2.96
33	3	"Exodus"	Mikael Salomon	Josh Pate	July 6, 2014	2.75
34	4	"Evolve or Die"	Bill Eagles	M. Raven Metzner	July 13, 2014	2.78
35	5	"Mind Wars"	Nathaniel Goodman	Bruce Marshall Romans	July 20, 2014	2.79
36	6	"Door Number Three"	Jonathan Frakes	Melissa Glenn	July 27, 2014	2.65
37	7	"Saturday Night Massacre"	Olatunde Osunsanmi	David Weddle & Bradley Thompson	August 3, 2014	2.73
38	8	"A Thing with Feathers"	David Solomon	Ryan Mottesheard	August 10, 2014	2.51
39	9	"Till Death Do Us Part"	Greg Beeman	Carol Barbee	August 17, 2014	2.46
40	10	"Drawing Straws"	Adam Kane	Josh Pate	August 24, 2014	2.56
41	11	"Space Oddity"	Olatunde Osunsanmi	M. Raven Metzner	August 31, 2014	2.39
42	12	"Shoot the Moon"	Greg Beeman	David Eick	August 31, 2014	2.43

=== Season 5 (2015) ===
No. overall	No. in season	Title	Directed by	Written by	Original release date	US viewers (millions)
43	1	"Find Your Warrior"	Olatunde Osunsanmi	David Eick	June 28, 2015	2.04
44	2	"Hunger Pains"	Olatunde Osunsanmi	Marc Dube	July 5, 2015	1.82
45	3	"Hatchlings"	Rob Lieberman	Jonathan Glassner	July 12, 2015	1.88
46	4	"Pope Breaks Bad"	Peter Leto	Jack Kenny	July 19, 2015	1.96
47	5	"Non-Essential Personnel"	Olatunde Osunsanmi	Jim Barnes	July 26, 2015	2.03
48	6	"Respite"	Jonathan Frakes	Ayanna A. Floyd	August 2, 2015	1.93
49	7	"Everybody Has Their Reasons"	Matt Earl Beesley	Ryan Mottesheard	August 9, 2015	1.98
50	8	"Stalag 14th Virginia"	Noah Wyle	Jack Kenny	August 16, 2015	1.94
51	9	"Reunion"	Brad Turner	Marc Dube	August 23, 2015	1.76
52	10	"Reborn"	Olatunde Osunsanmi	David Eick	August 30, 2015	2.39

== Ratings ==
Falling Skies : U.S. viewers per episode (millions)

Season	Episode number												Average
Season	1	2	3	4	5	6	7	8	9	10	11	12	Average
1	5.91	5.91	4.20	4.07	3.90	4.27	4.07	4.31	5.70	5.54	–		4.70
2	4.46	4.46	3.81	3.39	3.64	3.61	3.45	3.34	3.46	3.84	–		3.75
3	4.21	4.21	2.79	3.55	3.22	3.49	3.33	3.74	3.06	3.74	–		3.53
4	3.67	2.96	2.75	2.78	2.79	2.65	2.73	2.51	2.46	2.56	2.39	2.43	2.72
5	2.04	1.82	1.88	1.96	2.03	1.93	1.98	1.94	1.76	2.39	–		1.97

Audience measurement performed by Nielsen Media Research
