= Falling Skies season 1 =

Falling Skies
- Season 1
- Season 1 DVD cover
- Starring: Noah Wyle; Moon Bloodgood; Drew Roy; Jessy Schram; Maxim Knight; Seychelle Gabriel; Peter Shinkoda; Mpho Koaho; Connor Jessup; Will Patton; Sarah Carter; Colin Cunningham
- No. of episodes: 10

Release
- Original network: TNT
- Original release: June 19 – August 7, 2011

Season chronology
- Next → Season 2

The first season of the American drama television series Falling Skies commenced airing on June 19 and concluded on August 7, 2011. It consisted of ten episodes, each running approximately 40 minutes in length. TNT broadcast the first season on Sundays at 10:00 pm in the United States.

The first season picks up six months after the invasion and follows a group of survivors who band together to fight back. The group, known as the Second Massachusetts (an allusion to a historical regiment from the Continental Army), is led by the retired Captain Weaver and Boston University history professor Tom Mason who, while in search of his son Ben, must put his extensive knowledge of military history into practice as one of the leaders of the resistance movement.

The first season was met with positive reviews and the two-hour premiere was watched by 5.9 million viewers, making it cable television's biggest series launch of the year, with more than 2.6 million adults 18–49 and 3.2 million adults 25–54. The first-season finale received 5.6 million viewers, the highest-rated episode since the series premiere; with 2.5 million viewers in the 18–49 demographic.

== Cast and characters ==
=== Main ===
- Noah Wyle as Tom Mason, a former Boston University military history professor who becomes the second-in-command of the 2nd Massachusetts resistance, about 300 civilians and fighters fleeing Boston, fallen to invading aliens. He has three sons: Hal, the oldest, Ben, the middle child who was taken by the Skitters, and Matt, the youngest. His wife died a short time after the invasion while gathering supplies. He becomes friends with Anne Glass, and more.
- Moon Bloodgood as Anne Glass, the 2nd Mass's doctor. She was a pediatrician before the invasion. She supports civilians' rights to Weaver. Her husband and son were killed during the invasion, and she regrets having no photographs to remember them.
- Drew Roy as Hal Mason, Tom's oldest son. He is 16 years old, and a Scout in the 2nd Mass. His first girlfriend is Karen, although other girls do flirt, and he becomes closer to Maggie after Karen is taken.
- Jessy Schram as Karen Nadler, a teenage girl who works as a Scout in the resistance army. She lost her family in the invasion. Hal is her boyfriend. She is captured by the aliens, harnessed, and works for them.
- Maxim Knight as Matt, Tom's youngest son. His birthday wish is that everything return to before, but he soon volunteers to help Scott with the radio and Pope making mech-killing ammunition.
- Seychelle Gabriel as Lourdes, a former first year medical student who assists Anne. She is religious, and her faith is still strong despite the circumstances. She has a crush on Hal, discouraged by Karen.
- Peter Shinkoda as Dai, a fighter. Dai had no family to lose in the invasion, so seeing Tom as worrying parent, he counts his blessings.
- Mpho Koaho as Anthony, a former Boston cop who is a fighter in the 2nd Mass and part of Tom's team.
- Connor Jessup as Ben Mason, Tom's 14-year-old second son who was captured by the Skitters. In the pilot, Hal saw Ben among children wearing spinal harnesses, controlled by Skitters. He is eventually rescued and the harness removed, but the chemical changes, including strength and energy, and can hear radio waves[an ability used to hold off skitters and Mechs].
- Will Patton as Dan Weaver, the commander of the 2nd Mass. Weaver is a retired active and reserve military officer with the rank of captain, who served with Porter during the Gulf War. He does not like that the 2nd Mass includes so many civilians, but recognizes their role in giving fighters hope. He believes his family is lost, but finds evidence his wife and eldest daughter survived. Weaver was religious, but lost faith when the aliens came.
- Sarah Carter as Margaret ("Maggie"), was coerced and raped by Pope's team, so willingly helped Tom's squad escape. She wants to earn a place in the 2nd Mass. She knows opiate drug sources and the hospital where Skitters keep harnessed children because she had "bad" cancer at 16.
- Colin Cunningham as John Pope, the leader of a post-apocalyptic gang. He captured Tom, Hal, Karen, Anthony, and Dai and intended to trade them back to the 2nd Mass in exchange for an M2 Browning. Pope was captured and the rest of his gang killed when the alien ship shot at their flares.

=== Recurring ===
- Bruce Gray as Scott, Anne's uncle, teaches kids biology and repairs an old tube radio that detects Skitters communicating.
- Dylan Authors as Jimmy Boland, a 13-year-old soldier who fights in the 2nd Mass.
- Daniyah Ysrayl as Rick, son of Mike. He was harnessed by the Skitters.
- Martin Roach as Mike Thompson, a soldier for the 2nd Mass. His son was captured by the aliens. He was killed in Sanctuary Part 2 by Terry Clayton who took children, including all from 2nd Mass, for the Skitters.
- Dale Dye as Colonel Porter, the leader of the resistance against the Skitters in Boston. He was a U.S. military officer on the verge of retirement when the invasion came.
- Steven Weber as Michael Harris, a medical surgeon was friends with Tom and his wife, until he left her to attacking aliens. He finds the procedure to cut away harnesses with a blowtorch, leaving spikes, and medicate heavily with opiates to reduce withdrawal from harness-injected chemicals. He is killed while trying to inject a wounded Skitter brought back by Tom.
- Lynne Deragon as Aunt Kate, Anne's aunt and Scott's wife.
- Melissa Kramer as Sarah, a pregnant civilian in 2nd Mass.
- Henry Czerny as Terry Clayton
- Brent Jones as Click

== Episodes ==
No. overall	No. in season	Title	Directed by	Written by	Original release date	US viewers (millions)
1	1	"Live and Learn"	Carl Franklin	Robert Rodat	June 19, 2011	5.91
Six months after an alien invasion has destroyed 90% of the human race, history professor Tom Mason (Noah Wyle) is made second-in-command of the 2nd Mass (Massachusetts), a group of soldiers and civilians that include two of his sons, Hal and Matt. Weaver, 2nd Mass' commanding officer, sends Tom, Hal and a small group of soldiers on a recon mission to secure food, water and supplies for the rest of the troop. They are waylaid by Skitters, six-legged alien soldiers, and Mechs, bipedal hunter-killer machines, but manage to acquire enough supplies to last a couple of days. While on the mission, Hal catches a glimpse of his missing brother Ben, who has been enslaved by the aliens via a 'harness'.
2	2	"The Armory"	Greg Beeman	Graham Yost	June 19, 2011	5.91
Commander Weaver sends Tom and a small squad to scout out a possible weapons armory, but they are taken hostage by a group of outlaws who then try to use Tom and his team as leverage to acquire food, weapons and a vehicle. The trade is interrupted by an alien ship, which kills most of the outlaws. Their leader, known only as Pope, is taken into custody. Margaret, another one of the outlaws, agrees to help and fight for the 2nd Mass and help Tom find his enslaved son Ben, who was seen at a nearby hospital only days before.
3	3	"Prisoner of War"	Greg Beeman	Fred Golan	June 26, 2011	4.20
The 2nd Mass is joined by Dr. Michael Harris, an old acquaintance of Tom's and the only doctor to have discovered how to safely unharness enslaved children. A failed attempt to reclaim Tom's son Ben leaves Hal and his girlfriend Karen at the mercy of the aliens but another 2nd Mass soldier, Mike, serendipitously winds up saving his own captured son instead. A Skitter orders a Mech to kill the remaining kids in front of Hal, takes Karen hostage, then releases Hal to deliver a message: take one, the rest die. Tom realizes now that he can't rescue his son without endangering the other captives. Tom manages to capture a live Skitter to be used for medical research, and Pope becomes the 2nd Mass' new cook.
4	4	"Grace"	Fred Toye	Melinda Hsu Taylor	July 3, 2011	4.07
Tom and his team are sent to scout out an old motorcycle shop to see if any vehicles can be salvaged, and Weaver insists he take Pope along. After arriving at the store, Pope manages to escape and attacks a nest of sleeping Skitters, attracting the attention of nearby Mechs. Meanwhile, Anne attempts to communicate with the captured Skitter, while Harris is more interested in simply dissecting it. Mike's son, Ricky, awakens from his harness removal surgery, and immediately reattaches the harness to help the skitter escape. Ricky is interrupted before he can open the cage. Tom's team makes it back to the school with a few motorcycles.
5	5	"Silent Kill"	Fred Toye	Joe Weisberg	July 10, 2011	3.90
Tom works up a plan to extract his harnessed son Ben along with the other captive children from the local hospital. Captain Weaver tells Tom the plan has too many holes and that he should alter it. Meanwhile, Dr. Harris shines a bright light in the captured Skitter's face and tries to inject it with an unknown substance. The Skitter lashes out and strangles Harris in retaliation. Elsewhere, Hal comes up with an alternative plan, relying on stealth and infiltration to retrieve Ben from the hospital where he is being held captive. Hal volunteers to wear Ricky's harness and pretend to be a prisoner to rescue Ben. Anne learns to kill a Skitter (without making a sound) by taking advantage of the "soft palate" in the back of the Skitter's mouth. She stabs the captive Skitter in its weak-spot in front of Tom and Hal to prove her theory. Weaver then approves Hal's plan, and sends Tom's team in. Hal successfully enters the hospital and sees a Skitter leading Ben's group to sleep. Hal blends in with the group, unbeknownst to the Skitter. After the children fall asleep, Hal strikes and kills the Skitter. The team finally rescues Ben and five other children, and return them to the base-camp. All but one survives their harness-removal surgery. Ben awakes later, and recognizes his father.
6	6	"Sanctuary (Part 1)"	Sergio Mimica-Gezzan	Joel Anderson Thompson	July 17, 2011	4.27
While Anne is treating a young boy, his father robs the infirmary of medical supplies. The father, son, and the son's mother flee shortly afterwards. Tom, Weaver, and Mike give chase. Weaver allows the family to leave, if they drop the stolen drugs. Terry Clayton (Henry Czerny) holds a gun on the father until he agrees. Clayton is the leader of the 7th Massachusetts Volunteer Regiment and alleges his entire unit was wiped out. Meanwhile, Hal notices subtle changes in Ben's physical and dexterity development. Hal confides in Anne; he's witnessed Ben performing 102 push-ups, and his demeanor seemed out of character. Later that evening, a Mech performs a 'feint attack' at the defensive post guarded by Jimmy and Parker. Parker is killed, and Jimmy flees inside the school--unaware he has been pursued by a Skitter who has penetrated the encampment. Weaver rescue Jimmy, killing the Skitter. Next day, with grudging compliance of the parents, Terry leads the children to his encampment. Terry is later exposed as an enemy collaborator, exchanging children for the survival of his camp.
7	7	"Sanctuary (Part 2)"	Sergio Mimica-Gezzan	Melinda Hsu Taylor	July 24, 2011	4.07
Following the cliffhanger, Pope manages to escape by cutting the ropes with shards of glass. That night at dinner, Rick acts agitated and refuses to eat. Mike searches the barn and discovers a series of backpacks and clothing left behind. Terry catches him, and reveals his nefarious Faustian bargain. Terry encourages Mike to join their Sanctuary, but he warns Hal to wake the 2nd Mass children, and dies guarding their rear. Meanwhile, Tom suspect something has gone awry: their two guards have not returned, and the 3rd Mass has not arrived. Hal makes a judgment call to rest a few hours in the light at a suburban home, while untiring Ben volunteers to run ahead, and inform the 2nd Mass on Terry and his renegades. Terry and his men find the children. But Pope fires from the tree line first, killing one of Terry's men. A firefight ensues, wounding Pope in the leg, yet causing Tom to emerge from cover to strike a compromise. Tom will surrender everyone, if Terry will talk 'terms' upon return to the Sanctuary. Terry leads both groups into an ambush led by Weaver. Although Terry's men are immediately subdued, Terry's treachery provokes fatal fire from Tom. Sarah gives birth to the first baby girl, Charlotte, born into the 2nd Mass. during the alien occupation. Tom checks in on Pope healing from his gunshot wound. Although Tom is frustrated, he forgives Pope's indiscretions and takes him back as cook. At Mike's funeral, Hal praises his bravery, Lourdes sings a hymn, while Margaret holds Hal's hand. After the funeral disperses, Rick turns to Ben and says "(the Skitters)...would never kill one of our own," advising Ben that, "You should understand this", and keeps trying to recruit Ben to join him and return to his "family", the Skitters.
8	8	"What Hides Beneath"	Anthony Hemingway	Mark Verheiden	July 31, 2011	4.31
Colonel Porter returns to the 2nd Mass and informs them that not only has the 7th Mass been destroyed, there has also been no contact with the 4th and 5th Mass. At 2nd Mass, Colonel Porter tells Captain Weaver and Tom that the Skitters are falling back in every major city, this is the best time to strike the Skitter base, and he has a plan for coordinated simultaneous cross-country attacks. Weaver orders Tom to scout out the massive Skitter structure and determine how best to destroy it, and goes along himself because his former contracting experience could pinpoint the most vulnerable structural points. Meanwhile, Pope is placed in charge of developing the explosives required to destroy the structure. Anne performs a secret autopsy on the dead Skitter and finds a harness attached inside it, so suspects it may once have looked like something else, maybe even humanoid. While scouting the Skitter structure, Tom, Hal and Weaver spy a tall, humanoid third alien species directing Skitters. While returning to base, they are surprised by a strange woman who invites them into her home. Tom and Hal take up her offer. Weaver stays outside, ostensibly to guard their motorbikes, but leaves for his home, which Ricky has been drawing. Weaver removed the spark plugs on Tom and Hal's bikes, but they eventually follow. Tom finds him drinking whiskey in the backyard. Weaver explains that he had separated from his wife before the invasion and couldn't find her when the attack began. He found his younger daughter who had been harnessed and inadvertently killed her in removing it. They are interrupted when a Mech shows up, forcing Hal to hide and Tom and Weaver to work together to destroy it. Believing the strange woman betrayed them, they return to her apartment and discover she is an agent of the Skitters who use her to capture people. While questioning her, Karen, harnessed, asks from the other side of the door about them. Before Hal can do anything, Tom looks through the peep hole and comes face to face with one of the new 10-12' tall aliens. Back at the school, they find Pope demonstrating his new bullets made out from Mech armor. The shots can penetrate the Mech armor itself, to the applause of onlookers. Ricky, who observed this, takes off, followed by Ben.
9	9	"Mutiny"	Holly Dale	Joe Weisberg	August 7, 2011	5.70
Colonel Porter is missing, believed dead. No word has come from the 4th, 5th, or 7th Mass units. Captain Weaver has Tom locked up after Tom questions his mental state, his ability to lead the fighters and help the civilians, and his orders to continue the attack in the face of heavy odds. Tom manages to escape with Hal and Jimmy's help, confronts Weaver and convinces him to improve his original plan. Meanwhile, Scott and Ben work to disrupt the Skitters' transmissions.
10	10	"Eight Hours"	Greg Beeman	Mark Verheiden	August 7, 2011	5.54
Rick runs off to rejoin the Skitters and meets Megan, who promises to take him back in if he tells her everything he knows about the 2nd Mass. He does, but she departs, leaving him feeling betrayed, and surprised that Tom will take him back alive. Weaver presses on with the plan to attack the Skitter base, asking for 50 volunteers, explaining Porter is dead and the 4th and 5th Mass may be gone. Arriving at the rendezvous point for the three regiments with his troops, Weaver confirms that the 4th and 5th Mass have been destroyed. On learning that the Skitters know the whereabouts of the 2nd Mass, Tom decides to evacuate the civilians, leaving a small force behind. While Weaver's strike team are away, the 2nd Mass comes under attack from Mechs, but Scott and Ben save the day by finding and transmitting the right frequency to confuse the aliens. Believing his attack will turn into a suicide mission, Weaver sends Hal back to the 2nd Mass to report that the 4th and 5th Mass did not show up and are presumed destroyed. Tom heads out to rescue Weaver, and sends the radio and car back with Pope and Anthony, both wounded. Pope leaves him a rocket-propelled grenade launcher with Mech penetration ability. Tom finds Weaver, and shoots down a Skitter ship that crashes into the Skitter base with spectacular explosions. On the way home, Karen stops their truck and says the aliens will call back Ben unless Tom goes aboard the alien shuttle ship with the tall overlord. Weaver begs him to refuse, and remains behind, shocked as Tom follows Karen and the overlord aboard the ship.

== Production ==
=== Conception ===
Development officially began in 2009, when TNT announced that it had ordered to pilot an untitled alien invasion project. Falling Skies was created by Robert Rodat, who is best known for writing the Oscar-winning film Saving Private Ryan, which was directed by Steven Spielberg. Rodat wrote the pilot episode from an idea which was co-conceived by Spielberg. Originally, Falling Skies was called Concord, referencing the Battles of Lexington and Concord and Tom Mason's profession as a former History Professor. Spielberg then came up with the title Falling Skies. "I felt that this was a very interesting postapocalyptic story with a 21st century [spin on the] spirit of '76. I came up — out of the blue one day — with the name Falling Skies, which is basically what happens to the planet after this invasion. What is unique about this particular series is that the story starts after a successful conquest of the world," he stated. What attracted Spielberg to the project was the story of survival. "I've always been interested in how we survive and how resourceful we are as Americans. How would the survivors feed the children? How do they resupply themselves militarily in order to defend and even take back what they have lost?" he added. Like much of Spielberg's work, such as The Pacific and E.T. the Extra-Terrestrial, Falling Skies' running theme is family and brotherhood. He said of this "It's a theme I harken back to a lot because it's something I believe in. It's something I have the closest experience with. [Laughs] They say write what you know, and with seven children and three sisters... I tend to always come back to the family as a touchstone for audiences to get into these rather bizarre stories."

While writing the pilot, Rodat dedicated a five-page montage to the alien invasion, but decided not to go through with it as it had been done before. "I wrote a few drafts of it and I looked at and say, 'Ay-yay-yay, I've seen this before. There's no emotion to this. It feels like one of those montages,'" he said. Rodat came up with the idea of having the children in the series "harnessed by aliens". "When we were working out the initial stuff, the thing that excited [Spielberg] was the idea that adults are killed if they're a threat, and kids are captured for whatever reason and changed or altered. The harness was a logical outgrowth of that. Then what we'll explore is what the harnessing does to the kid over the course of the show but that also is something that's going to have to unveil itself gradually," he stated. Spielberg previously explored the idea of enslaved children in the 1984 film Indiana Jones and the Temple of Doom.

Spielberg's fingerprints are all over this. He shaped the script, cast the pilot, watched all the dailies, made the editing suggestions, worked on the post and on the aliens and spaceships.

— Series lead, Noah Wyle

Series lead Noah Wyle emphasized Spielberg's presence on set by stating "Anytime he gives an anointment to a project, it steps up the pedigree." Colin Cunningham, who plays outlaw John Pope, exclaimed "You'd show up and think, 'This is not a TV show; this is something else that we're doing,' " he said, noting that Spielberg was very hands-on for the pilot. "Its scope is massive. Anytime you hear the word Spielberg, you know it's not going to be crap; you know it'll be quality and there will be some money behind it." Mark Verheiden, who was the showrunner for the first season, stated "It's great to know you have a world-class filmmaker backing up what you're trying to do who is supportive and helping design the great stuff."

=== Casting ===
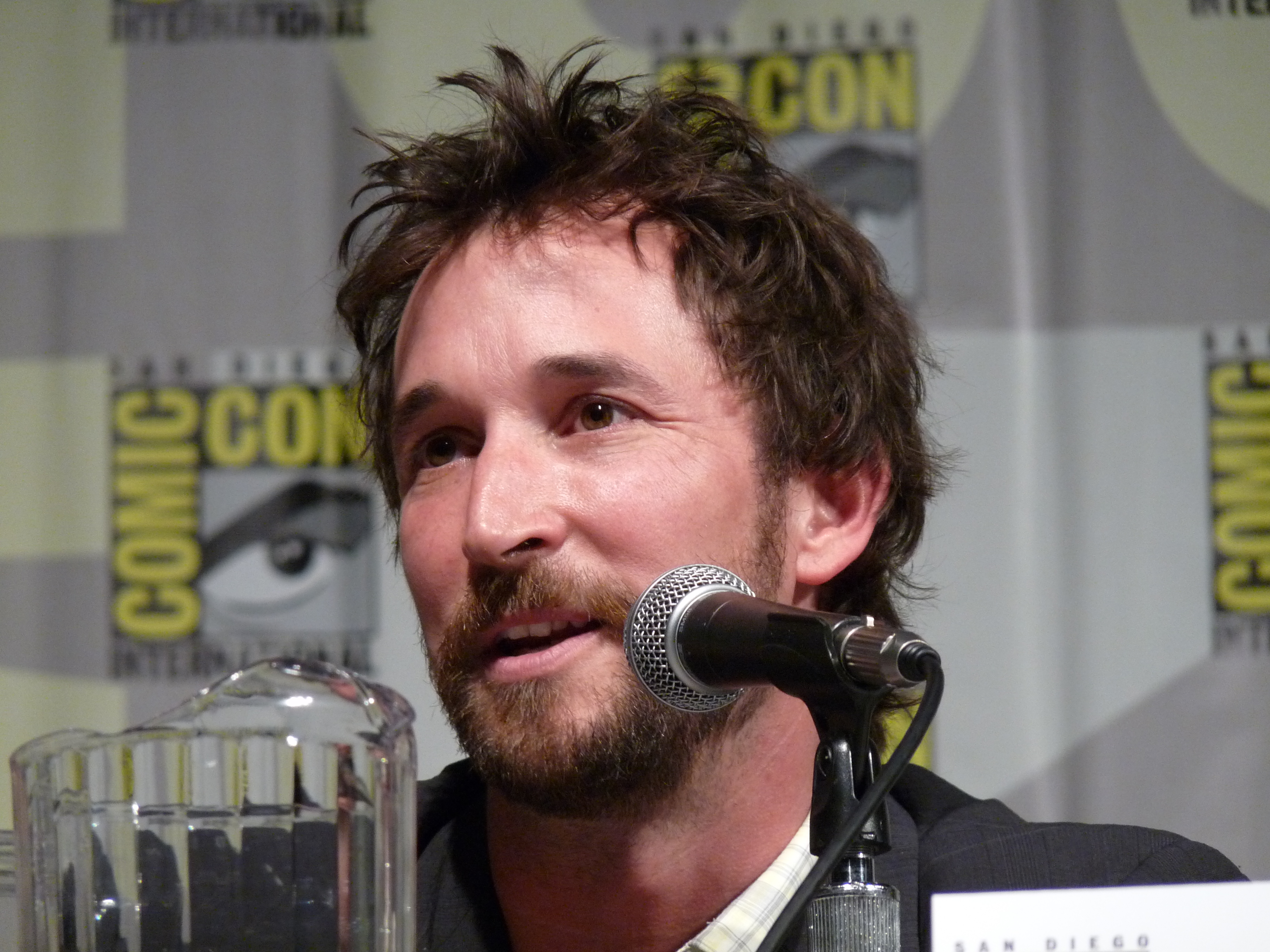
Wyle at the 2010 San Diego Comic-Con promoting the series.

One of the things that was most attractive about it was shooting 10 episodes as opposed to 24, which affords me a bit of quality-of-life and allows me to have a presence in my kids' lives. But in terms of quality of writing, this was great writing. Mark Verheiden's a great writer. I enjoy this kind of storytelling just as much as all of those years on "ER."

— Noah Wyle, on why he chose the role

Casting announcements began in June 2009 when Noah Wyle was announced as the lead. Wyle, who worked with TNT on the Librarian films, was sent scripts for various shows on their network. He said part of the reason he chose the part was to gain credibility from his children. "With the birth of my kids, I started to really look at my career through their eyes more than my own, so that does dictate choice, steering me toward certain things and away from other things," he said. He also decided to do it as he could relate with his character, stating "I identified with Tom's devotion to his sons, and admired his sense of social duty." Spielberg wanted Wyle for the role because he knew him from his previous series ER, which Spielberg's company produced. He had wanted Wyle to appear in his 1998 film Saving Private Ryan but due to scheduling conflicts, he was unable to star. Spielberg stated that he was determined to work with him again. In July 2009, Moon Bloodgood, Jessy Schram, Seychelle Gabriel and Maxim Knight were cast as Anne Glass, Karen Nadler, Lourdes and Matt Mason, respectively. Bloodgood, the female lead, did not have to audition for the role. She received the script and was offered the role. Bloodgood was drawn to the role because of Spielberg and Rodat's involvement. She stated: "Well certainly when you get handed a script and they tell you it's Bob Rodat and Steven Spielberg, you're immediately drawn to it. It's got your attention. I was a little cautious about wanting to do science fiction again. But it was more of a drama story, more of a family story. I liked that and I wanted to work with Spielberg." Bloodgood added that portraying a doctor excited her. "I liked the idea of playing a doctor and deviating from something I had done already," she said. In August 2009, Drew Roy and Peter Shinkoda were cast as Hal Mason and Dai, respectively. Drew Roy's agent received the script and the pair joked that Roy might get the role. "This one came to me through my agent, just like everything else. We even joked about the fact that it was a Steven Spielberg project. We were like, "Oh yeah, I might have a chance." We were just joking." He auditioned four times for the part. "The whole process went on for quite some time, and then towards the end, it was down to me and one other guy, and we were literally waiting for the word from Steven Spielberg 'cause he had to watch the two audition tapes and give the okay. That, in and of itself, had me like, "Okay, even if I don't get it, that's just cool." Fortunately, it went my way."

=== Crew ===
Rodat and Spielberg serve as executive producers on the project. Graham Yost, Justin Falvey and Darryl Frank are also executive producers. Yost had previously worked with Spielberg on the HBO miniseries The Pacific. Mark Verheiden is a co-executive producer and the series showrunner. Verheiden had worked as a writer and producer on Battlestar Galactica. Greg Beeman is also a co-executive producer. Melinda Hsu Taylor is a supervising producer for the series; she previously worked on Lost. John Ryan is the on set producer. Remi Aubuchon was hired as the showrunner for the second season in May 2011 before the first-season premiere. TNT announced production had begun on the second season on October 24, 2011.

== Distribution ==
=== Promotion ===
Promotional poster of Falling Skies.

The show's official website offered an online web-comic prior to the show's launch. The comic, released every two weeks, follows the characters of the series just weeks after the alien invasion. It is published by Dark Horse Comics and a 104-page comic was released on July 5, 2011. Character videos are also available online. The videos explore the main characters of Falling Skies. As part of the promotional campaign, a vehicle, with the TNT logo and called Falling Skies Technical, was released as a free gift in the social networking game Mafia Wars on June 14, 2011.

=== Blu-ray and DVD releases ===
The first season was released on DVD and Blu-ray on June 5, 2012, in North America, on July 2, 2012, in the United Kingdom and on August 29, 2012, in Australia. In addition to all the episodes of the first season, extras include an extended version of the pilot episode; audio commentary on the pilot episode; a Season two preview; the 2011 San Diego Comic-Con panel; deleted scenes; character profiles; international promos; behind the scenes featurettes, including the "Making of Skitter", "Harness Makeup Tips" and "Director One on One". A collectible Trading Card was released exclusively to Blu-ray.

=== Broadcast ===
List of international telecasts

The series premiered on June 19, 2011, and is broadcast on the cable television channel TNT, in the United States. In Summer 2011, it premiered internationally in more than 75 countries.

- Argentina — TNT
- Australia — Fox8
- Brazil — TNT
- Canada — Super Channel and Ztélé (in French)
- Chile — TNT
- Dominican Republic — TNT
- Ecuador — TNT
- France — Orange Cinémax
- Germany — TNT Serie
- Greece — FX
- Ireland - FX
- Mexico — TNT
- Paraguay — TNT
- Spain — TNT España
- United Kingdom — FX
- Uruguay — TNT
- Venezuela — TNT

== Reception ==
=== Critical reception ===
Falling Skies received generally positive reviews from television critics. Tim Goodman of The Hollywood Reporter wrote "...the entertainment value and suspense of Falling Skies is paced just right. You get the sense that we'll get those answers eventually. And yet, you want to devour the next episode immediately." Thomas Conner of the Chicago Sun-Times called it "...a trustworthy family drama but with aliens." He continued, "It's 'Jericho' meets 'V', with the good from both and the bad discarded. It'll raise the summer-TV bar significantly." Ken Tucker from Entertainment Weekly gave the series a B+ and wrote, "A similar, gradually developed, but decisive conviction makes Falling Skies an engaging, if derivative, chunk of dystopian sci-fi." He continued, "...Falling Skies rises above any one performance; it's the spectacle of humans versus aliens that draws you in." In the Boston Herald, Mark A. Perigard gave the series a B grade, writing "Don't look now, but Falling Skies could be a summer obsession."

In Variety, Brian Lowry stated that he enjoyed the action sequences but that "the soapier elements mostly fall flat", and called the series "painfully old-fashioned". Mike Hale, from The New York Times, called the series "average" and "good on the action, a little muddled on the ideas". He added that "the tone is placid and slightly monotonous, as if we were watching the Walton family at the end of the world". The Washington Post reviewer Hank Steuver criticized the actor portrayals, writing that "the show is slowed by so many wooden performances, Wyle's included". He also states he found himself "root[ing] for the aliens, which cannot have been the writers' intent". In The Miami Herald, Glenn Garvin also criticized the poor acting, stating, "the 'Falling Skies' cast appears unconvinced and unconvincing." Garvin singled out the performance of Sarah Carter as the only exception, and added that Spielberg has "bottomed out" with this family drama series. At review aggregator Metacritic the first season scored 71%, based on 27 critic reviews, indicating "generally favorable" reviews.

=== Ratings ===
The two-hour premiere of Falling Skies was watched by 5.9 million viewers, making it cable television's biggest series launch of the year, with more than 2.6 million adults 18–49 and 3.2 million adults 25–54. The eighth episode was watched by 4.31 million viewers and scored a 1.5 ratings share among adults 18-49 and became TNT's highest-rated series in target demos. The first-season finale received 5.6 million viewers, the highest-rated episode since the series premiere; with 2.5 million viewers in the 18–49 demographic. The first season tied with the FX drama series American Horror Story as the biggest new cable series of the year among adults 18–49. In the UK, it premiered on the non-terrestrial channel FX, with 402,000 viewers.
