= Anne Glass =

- Falling Skies character
- Anne Glass, as portrayed by Moon Bloodgood
- First appearance: Live and Learn
- Last appearance: Reborn
- Created by: Robert Rodat

In-universe information
- Occupation: Pediatrician
- Spouse: Lee (deceased)
- Significant other: Tom Mason
- Children: Sam (deceased); Alexis Denise Glass Mason (with Tom Mason) (deceased)
- Relatives: Scott (uncle, deceased)

Anne Glass is a fictional character on the TNT television series Falling Skies played by Moon Bloodgood. She is the de facto female lead. Falling Skies tells the story of the aftermath of a global invasion by several races of extraterrestrials that neutralizes the world's power grid and technology, quickly destroys the combined militaries of all the world's countries, and apparently kills over 90% of the human population within a few days. Anne was a pediatrician before the invasion. She is very inclined towards the civilians, and believes that they should do all they can to help them. Her husband and son were killed at home in the bombings during the invasion.

== Character history ==
=== Season 1 ===
In the first season, Anne Glass is the 2nd Mass doctor. Before the invasion, Glass was a pediatrician. She forms a close bond with Tom Mason and his three sons Hal, Ben and Matt. Her husband and young son were killed during the attacks. Anne begins to remove Harnesses from the captured kids and saves Tom's son, Ben. She tries to communicate with a captured Skitter, before killing it silently by taking advantage of the "soft palate" in the back of the Skitter's mouth.

While Anne is treating a young boy, his father robs the infirmary of medical supplies. She learns how to shoot a gun in order to defend herself. Near the end of the season Tom and Anne grow closer. When the 2nd Mass is fleeing the school, Tom puts Anne in charge of his sons while he leaves for the city. Before he leaves, Tom kisses Anne.

=== Season 2 ===
In the second season, Anne Glass deals with the after effects of the Battle of Fitchburg along with the other members of the 2nd Mass, and is on the road traveling. During the journey she becomes closer to Tom, which later develops into an intimate relationship. She also saves the life of Captain Dan Weaver who had been infected by a Skitter and as a result was suffering from a life-threatening infection. She does this by devising a radical treatment plan in the hospital the 2nd Mass found themselves in, which successfully cures him. She then later travels to Charleston with the other members of the 2nd Mass.

When she arrives in Charleston she quickly offers her services as a Doctor and is put to work. When she joins Tom, Hal, Maggie, and Ben on a dangerous plan to assassinate an Overlord, Karen reveals her secret that she's pregnant to Tom and the group who are being restrained in front of the Overlord. Karen threatens her safety in an attempt to get the group to talk but later escapes and returns safely to Charleston unharmed along with the rest of the group.

=== Season 3 ===
In the third season, she settles in with her daily life as a doctor in Charleston and grows closer to Tom Mason and his children Hal, Ben and Matt. Despite being pregnant she is able to resume her duties until she goes into labor and gives birth to her daughter Alexis. After the birth, she becomes concerned that something might be wrong with her baby and later discovers that she is part alien. Fearing how the residents of Charleston would react, she flees Charleston with Alexis and is abducted by a harnessed child and a skitter.

As the members of the 2nd Mass, including Tom and his sons, take her disappearance hard. They endeavor to find and rescue her and Alexis, later discovering that Karen is holding her captive at an Espheni base. Later, it is revealed that Karen has apparently had both her and Alexis killed.

With the Volm weapon successfully destroying the Boston tower, and the Volm establishing themselves in their city sized ship in the area Boston once was, the 2nd Mass celebrate their victory. However, the Volm intend to relocate the 2nd Mass to Brazil with the situation being conclusively resolved, for now. The 2nd Mass make their way back to Charleston. Along the way an Espheni ship flies overhead and lands. Karen emerges from the ship and approaches the 2nd Mass; prior to being shot and killed, she returns Anne and Alexis to Tom.

As Tom and Anne reunite, Tom is surprised when Anne reveals that Alexis has grown to the size of a 6-year-old child in such a small space of time. With the battle over for now, Tom, Anne, and Alexis return to Charleston, along with the rest of the 2nd Mass.

=== Season 4 ===
Twenty-three days later, Anne, along with the 2nd Mass and Tom, arrive back at Charleston, but before they can celebrate, the group are attacked by Espheni ships and mechs, but when the Espheni attempt to ensnare the group with their obelisks, she is separated from Tom and Lexi, and is forced to flee with other surviving members of the 2nd Mass. Distraught at her situation, she resolves to reunite with Lexi, Tom, and his sons.

When Anne and the 2nd Mass survivors learn of what they believe to be a weapons shipment, they ambush the truck but are left shocked when they discover unharnessed children inside. Anne, meanwhile, shows a picture of Lexi to the children but is left disappointed when none have seen or heard of her. She then decides to follow the path she believed the truck to be headed in, believing it may offer some clue as to where Lexi is.

While on the road, several 2nd Mass members express their concerns about Annes well being, but they are interrupted when a skitter attacks the group. When Anne disables the skitter, she questions the skitter and demands to know if it knows where Lexi is located, with Denis' help. When the skitter informs Anne about the Espheni plan to use the captured children as hybrids, she becomes enraged and kills it. Consumed by rage, Anne doesn't realize that as Deni is still connected to it, she has caused her a great deal of pain. Later that night, Anne apologizes to Deni and is informed about the fear the skitter experienced when questioned about the hybrids and what may be in the west. Anne assumes this to be Lexis' location.

Anne collapses from exhaustion and is unresponsive. When the 2nd Mass believe this to be a result of Anne not taking proper care of herself during the journey, they stop and care for her. Anne, meanwhile, dreams that she is heavily pregnant on board an Espheni ship with Karen and an Overlord. To Anne's horror, she is linked with an Overlord who appears to be affecting her unborn child. When Anne awakens the next day, she informs the 2nd Mass that they are close to Lexi, and when questioned, she replies that she had a dream.

Shortly afterwards, Anne and the 2nd Mass arrive in Chinatown, and Anne reunites with Ben and Lourdes, and, to her relief, she embraces a now grown-up Lexi. Her emotional reunion is cut short when Ben and Maggie explain that Lexi had made a deal with an Overlord to protect the residents of Chinatown, and is forced to confront her. When Lexi explains that she has done this for the greater good, Anne angrily confronts the Overlord, who speaks through Ben and explains that he believes the Espheni can live with humanity in peace. Anne is forced to back down when Lexi awakens her powers after Anne orders that the Overlord be captured.

With the Overlord now captured, Anne questions the Overlord again with the help of Ben but is forced to cease the interrogation when Ben's health is affected. Now outside, Anne is confronted by an angry Lexi who uses her powers to choke her but collapses before she can kill Anne. Concerned for Lexis' well-being, Anne enlists the help of Dr. Kadar, who notes extreme concern for her health and mentions that her fever is over 120 degrees. As Lexi's health takes a turn for the worse, Anne turns to the Overlord in desperation, and begs it for help, seemingly unaware it's still connected to Ben. When the Overlord doesn't answer her, she attacks it, causing Ben agonizing pain. Maggie hears Ben mention flowers and rushes to tell Anne the news, and of Bens condition. Understanding what the Overlord meant, Anne is able to calm Lexis fever, but is tricked by Lexi who orders Lourdes to release the Overlord. Before Anne can question Lexis motive, Lexi tells her that the Overlord is her father.

After an emotional reunion with Tom, she is faced with news from Lourdes that Lexi is now in a cocoon. Upset for her daughter she draws her knife and goes towards Lexi to free her, but is stopped by Tom who warns against irrational behavior as it may cost Lexi her life. Realizing that she also was in a cocoon in the Espheni tower, at Dr Kadars advice Anne undertakes memory regression. She recalls her last moments with her son Sammy before awakening. Distressed by the memory, Anne continues and recalls how she was at the Espheni tower in a cocoon with Karen holding baby Lexi, Karen tells her that Lexi is her creation and that they're only keeping her alive as Lexi needs a mother. Anne despairs.

Now in a dream limbo, Anne is contacted by Lexi who shows her a memory from childhood at the Espheni tower. Anne witnesses Karen's attempt to manipulate Lexi, but the young Lexi resolves to stay by Anne's side. Anne hears how she choose her that day, and that she needed her as she's her mother. Emotional from the revelation, Anne embraces Lexi and is then helped to awaken. Now awake, Anne makes her way to the cocoon and touches it, Lexi's eyes open.

Faced with the agony of losing Lexi, who leaves Chinatown after killing Lourdes. Anne turns to Dr Kadar for answers but he is unable to explain her actions. But when the Espheni attack Chinatown, she is forced to retreat into an underground shelter and is separated from Tom. After the battle, Anne is called into action when she learns that Maggie is paralyzed from the Espheni attack and requires immediate treatment. She learns of an experimental treatment involving the use some of Deni's spike fluid to heal Maggie, but the procedure is unsuccessful. Ben suggests to Anne that she use his spikes and transplant some into Maggie, but Anne wants Maggie's permission first. Hal tricks Anne into performing the treatment, and with the Volm's help and technology she successfully treats Maggie's paralysis.

Believing the Beamer can be of help in the war against the Espheni, Anne decides to join a small team to retrieve a Volm supply cache which Cochise promises will be of help with unearthing the Beamer. However, Anne is faced with an attack led by Kent Matthews and comes to Tom's aid. But with the cache all but destroyed, she returns to Chinatown with the group.

=== Season 5 ===
Anne continues to fight the Espheni who are now disorganized and without their mechanized support. Tom returns from space with the help of the Espheni's Great Enemy, the Dornia, but Lexi dies in the attack on the power core. Anne aids Tom as he rallies the militias around the world for a worldwide counterattack on the Espheni bases, with the militias in the United States marching on Washington, D.C. After linking up with a militia known as the 14th Virginia, the resistance learns from an Espheni communications device that the Overlords serve a queen. Anne monitors Ben as he uses the device to try to locate the queen and works with Marty to modify the Dornia bioweapon to be non-lethal to humans. She also has to face the possible return of Lexi who claims to have been saved by the Dornia like Tom but who everyone thinks is actually an Espheni trap. Anne refuses to accept Lexi and proves to be right as she turns out to be an Espheni clone created to assassinate Tom. After the Lexi clone is killed by the Dornia bioweapon, proving its effectiveness, Anne admits she didn't know for sure that it wasn't really Lexi but did hope it was. Anne acts as part of the strike team that heads to the Lincoln Memorial to kill the queen and is freaked out by Espheni eggs in the city's service tunnels. When confronted by Tom about it, she tells him that she is once again pregnant. As they make their way through the tunnels, the hatchlings awaken and Lieutenant Wolf kills them with a grenade launcher. Unknown to anyone else, Anne is hit by shrapnel from the explosion and is mortally wounded. Anne keeps her injury from the rest of the group as they look for another way out of the tunnels, having been cut-off from Tom. Soon after they get out, Anne collapses and tells Weaver to go on without her. Weaver and the rest of the team desperately try to save Anne, but she dies of her wounds, watching as the Espheni are destroyed. Ben brings Tom, who infected the Espheni with the bioweapon through their queen to Anne and he is left devastated by her death. Remembering how the Dornia had saved him, Tom carries Anne to the beach where he'd last seen the Dornia and begs them to save Anne since he got them their vengeance. After a moment, the Dornia pull Anne beneath the waves. A mortally wounded John Pope arrives, but upon seeing Tom's grief at Anne's death, lets go of his own vengeance and dies of his wounds. The Dornia resurrect Anne and her baby and restore her to Tom. Months later, a visibly pregnant Anne attends Tom's speech at the rebuilt Lincoln Memorial where a now-united humanity has gathered to choose a new leader.

== Casting ==
Bloodgood was cast in Falling Skies in July 2009. Bloodgood did not have to audition for the role. She received the script and was offered the role. Bloodgood was drawn to the role because of Spielberg and Rodat's involvement. She stated: "Well certainly when you get handed a script and they tell you it’s Bob Rodat and Steven Spielberg, you’re immediately drawn to it. It’s got your attention. I was a little cautious about wanting to do science fiction again. But it was more of a drama story, more of a family story. I liked that and I wanted to work with Spielberg." Bloodgood added that portraying a doctor excited her. "I liked the idea of playing a doctor and deviating from something I had done already," she said.
