= Grace (Falling Skies) =

- Falling Skies episode
- Anne, Mike, Scott and Dr. Harris notice interference on the radio.
- Episode no.: Season 1 Episode 4
- Directed by: Fred Toye
- Written by: Melinda Hsu Taylor
- Production code: 104
- Original air date: July 3, 2011

Guest appearances
- Bruce Gray as Uncle Scott; Martin Roach as Mike; Steven Weber as Dr. Harris

Episode chronology
← Previous "Prisoner of War"	Next → "Silent Kill"
- Falling Skies season 1

"Grace" is the fourth episode of the first season of the TNT science fiction drama Falling Skies, which originally aired July 3, 2011. The episode was written by Melinda Hsu Taylor and directed by Fred Toye.

Tom and his team are sent to scout out an old motorcycle shop, and Weaver insists he take Pope along. After arriving at the store, Pope manages to escape and attacks a nest of sleeping Skitters, attracting the attention of nearby Mechs. Meanwhile, Anne attempts to communicate with the captured Skitter.

== Plot ==
The Skitter that Tom captured is being held in a special confinement for Anne and Dr. Harris to study its physiology and anatomy to know more about its weakness.

Meanwhile, Pope informs Weaver that there is a motorcycle shop nearby. Weaver tells Tom to take a team to get the bikes, and Tom reluctantly agrees to let Pope accompany them. On their hunt for bikes, the group sees Skitters sleeping. Pope wants to shoot them down, but Tom decides to leave them alone after there are reports that Mechs are nearby.

At the motorcycle shop, the gang prepares to get the bikes, but Pope escapes on a motorcycle. He goes back to the sleeping Skitters and blows them up with a few grenades, alerting the aliens of their presence. A group of armed "harnessed kids" finds Tom and the others. The kids fire, forcing the group back to the shop. Tom learns that the kids move together, and they only shoot when there is a target. Tom distracts them, allowing the group to escape.

Back at the school, Mike's son, Rick, doesn't recognize his father. Mike confronts the Skitter and threatens to kill it if it doesn't begin communicating with him. When the Skitter does not, Mike thrusts his gun into the Skitter's mouth, knocking it out unconsciously, revealing a "pressure point" near the Skitter's soft palate. Anne notices that interference comes onto a radio both times the Skitter is provoked and theorizes that Skitters communicate with each other in radio frequencies, so the captured Skitter cannot alert the other aliens.

Rick attempts to reattach the "harness" to his back and is about to let the Skitter out before Mike stops him. Harris communicates with the Skitter through Rick, asking the Skitter through Rick what the Skitter wants from them. Mike rips the "harness" off his son, knocking his son out.

Tom tells Weaver that he will look for the drugs needed for the operations and then go look for Ben. Weaver says that if his child was still alive, nothing on earth could keep him from going after him. Tom and Hal talk about Ben. Hal mentions that he's worried that Ben will be different when he gets back.

== Production ==
=== Development ===
The episode was written by Melinda Hsu Taylor and it was directed by Fred Toye. Melinda Hsu Taylor later writes the second part of the two part Sanctuary episode. Fred Toye later directs Silent Kill.

Greg Beeman stated in his blog that a difficult production problem the crew faced were the scenes involving the caged Skitter. The Skitter was designed and built by Todd Masters in Vancouver. Beeman stated that the alien "really looked real on set and it worked flawlessly." In Prisoner of War the Skitter that attacked Tom was a full-scale animatronic puppet. It took five people to operate it. The crew shot the episode in the summer and "the guy inside the suit was buried beneath six inches of foam rubber." The Skitter suit caused him to heat up quickly. He could only go ten or fifteen minutes between takes, at which time he would need to take a break, which was time consuming.

== Reception ==
=== Ratings ===
In its original American broadcast, "Grace" was seen by an estimated 4.07 million household viewers, according to Nielsen Media Research. "Grace" received a 1.4 rating among viewers between ages 18 and 49, which is down a tenth versus the previous episode’s 1.5 rating.

=== Reviews ===
The A.V. Club gave the episode a B−.

Matt Richenthal from TV Fanatic said of the episode: "Not every episode can feature a major battle between the survivors and the aliens, for both production reasons and storyline reasons. The show wouldn't last half a season if that were the case. But Falling Skies has done a strong enough job building up characters that 'Grace' felt like more than filler."
