= Tom Mason (Falling Skies) =

- Falling Skies character
- Tom Mason, as portrayed by Noah Wyle.
- First appearance: "Live and Learn"
- Last appearance: "Reborn"
- Created by: Robert Rodat

In-universe information
- Occupation: Fighter/Resistance leader against the alien invaders, Former President of the New United States, Former Boston University History professor
- Significant others: Rebecca Mason (deceased); Anne Glass
- Children: Hal Mason; Ben Mason; Matt Mason; Alexis Denise Glass Mason (with Anne Glass)

Tom Mason is a fictional character and protagonist of the TNT television series Falling Skies. The character is played by Noah Wyle. Falling Skies tells the story of the aftermath of a global invasion by several races of extraterrestrials that neutralizes the world's power grid and technology, quickly destroys the combined militaries of all the world's countries, and apparently kills over 90% of the human population within a few days. Mason is one of the leaders of the 2nd Massachusetts Militia Regiment, a group of survivors fighting against the aliens.

The character was created by series creator Robert Rodat. Noah Wyle was cast in the role in 2009, on recommendation by executive producer Steven Spielberg who produced Wyle's previous series ER.

== Character history ==
=== Season 1 ===
At the opening of the series, most of the human race has been destroyed in an alien invasion. Tom Mason, a history professor from Boston who almost always wears the same bike gloves, is made second-in-command of the 2nd Massachusetts Militia Regiment, a group of civilians and fighters fleeing the city. Tom's three sons are Hal, Ben, and Matt; his wife perished during the initial stages of the invasion. At the start of the series, Ben has been captured by the "Skitters" – six-legged beings who make up the alien ground forces – and fitted with a "harness" that is making him perform slave labor through mind control. Around this time, Tom encounters a group of scavengers led by a man named John Pope (Colin Cunningham). After a firefight with Skitters, Pope's group is reluctantly taken in by the 2nd Mass.

After learning that Ben is being kept in a hospital with other brainwashed children, Tom, Hal, and the 2nd Mass' commanding officer, Captain Dan Weaver (Will Patton), formulate a plan to infiltrate the building, kill the Skitter guarding them, and rescue Ben and the other captives. Ben's harness is removed, but Hal notices that his brother has undergone physical and behavioral changes during his time in captivity. Meanwhile, Terry Clayton (Henry Czerny), an old friend of Weaver's and the commander of another survivor group, is revealed to be a collaborator who is giving human children to the Skitters. After Clayton's treachery is revealed, Tom fatally shoots him.

When Skitter forces draw back in major cities, the 2nd Mass decide to launch an offensive on the alien base in Boston; Tom and Weaver scout it to detect weaknesses. It is during this expedition that they realize the Skitters are being commanded by another race of aliens later identified as the "Overlords." During the initial stages of the attack, Tom evacuates the 2nd Mass' civilian population from the school where they are hiding, then joins the fight in Boston. Using a grenade launcher given to him by Pope, Tom shoots down a spacecraft which crashes into and destroys the alien base. The Overlords, having underestimated the human resistance, offer to begin negotiations with the 2nd Mass. Tom begrudgingly agrees when he is told that it will save Ben from his transformation by the harness. The season ends with Tom being led aboard an Overlord ship.

=== Season 2 ===
Three months after the battle in Boston, a traumatized Tom is returned to the 2nd Mass and is accidentally shot by Ben. In flashbacks, it is revealed that Tom was put through agonizing torture before being brought before the Overlords, who offered to allow the 2nd Mass to peacefully live in a "neutral zone" in exchange for their surrender; Tom refused. A "Mech" – one of the robotic beings fighting alongside the Skitters – massacred a group of humans as a reprisal. After he recovers, Tom becomes the focus of suspicion by other members of the 2nd Mass, who fear that he turned or was brainwashed while in alien captivity; this tension leads to a conflict between Tom and Pope, who forms a parallel group called the Berserkers. A parasitical alien probe is found and removed from Tom's eye, leading him to question his own loyalty.

The 2nd Mass decides to travel to Charleston, South Carolina, where they have been told that other groups of survivors – led by former members of the U.S. government – are organizing. Over the course of the journey, Tom grows ever closer to Anne Glass (Moon Bloodgood), the medical doctor for the 2nd Mass. The group comes across a Skitter that Tom identifies as one of the aliens who tortured him during his time on the ship. They learn that a large group of Skitters have fought off the control of the harness and are mounting a rebellion against the Overlords; the Skitter rebels desire an alliance with the humans. During a firefight with alien forces, Tom briefly holds an Overlord – who was also present during Tom's own captivity – captive.

Upon arriving in Charleston, Tom is reunited with his academic mentor, Arthur Manchester (Terry O'Quinn). Manchester, the "Majority Leader" of Charleston's government, is overeager to prevent hostilities with the aliens, a position that Tom and Weaver consider reckless. When given the option of joining forces with the approaching Skitter rebellion, Manchester refuses and eventually orders that all members of the 2nd Mass be arrested. However, General Cole Bressler (Matt Frewer), the commander of Charleston's resistance force, mounts a coup and deposes Manchester. Tom facilitates dialogue between the rebel Skitters and the humans, resulting in a plot to assassinate the Overlord that was briefly captured by the 2nd Mass. The 2nd Mass is forced to work with the Skitters with no help from Bressler or his men. During the attack on an Overlord weapon, the location of which had been provided by the rebel Skitters, Tom, Weaver, Hal, Ben, Maggie and Anne are captured by Karen and her Overlord master. While torturing them to find out what they know, Karen reveals to Tom that Anne is pregnant with his child. Before she can inflict harm on either of them, Tom says that he will talk.

At that moment, the rebel Skitters attack and free the humans while taking care of the Overlord's forces. The Overlord himself is attacked by the rebel leader, "Red Eye", but Red Eye is killed. Tom seizes the electrostaff that Karen had used to torture them and used to kill the Overlord. As he does so, Karen flees, screaming that they will never win. The weapon is successfully destroyed, marking one of humanity's first major victories since the beginning of the invasion. However, despite the victory and Manchester's offer that Tom be elected to succeed him as Majority Leader, Tom and Weaver believe that the best thing for the 2nd Mass is to leave Charleston and continue their life on the road. However, before they can leave, a firestorm apparently engulfs Charleston and several pod-like ships land, revealing new aliens.

=== Season 3 ===
As Season Three begins, the 2nd Mass is still in Charleston and Tom has been elected President of the New United States. Also, the human resistance and their Skitter allies have formed an alliance with the new aliens, known as the Volm, who have provided them with the technology to effectively combat the Overlords, whose name has been revealed as being the Espheni. They have also provided a device to remove harnesses from enslaved captives, which Dr. Glass (now well advanced in pregnancy) is seen using. One of the Volm, whom Tom names Cochise, is now serving as an adviser to and fights alongside the 2nd Mass. After seven months of combat, the humans are finally drawing blood against the invaders, so much so that the Espheni have had to resort to espionage to gain an advantage over the humans and their intergalactic enemies, the Volm.

While Tom carries on his duties as President of the New United States, he has to deal with many of the hardships of being a leader - including the issue of a mole within Charleston. Manchester is given the job of uncovering the mole's identity, and is on the verge of doing so when the mole kills him in his office with an energy weapon. Anne later gives birth to Tom's daughter Alexis, but his joy is short-lived when Charleston is attacked by a group of soldiers working for a man they call the President of the United States, Benjamin Hathaway. Tom successfully defuses the situation, but loses a member of the Berserkers along the way. Then, with the help of Lt. Fisher, Tom makes contact with Benjamin Hathaway forces and decides to travel to Keystone to meet them along with Cochise, Pope and Bressler. After receiving a somewhat subdued reaction from President Hathaway and his troops, he is later forced to leave Keystone, leaving behind Cochise, and while en route back to Charleston has his plane shot down by an Espheni ship.

Tom then finds himself in a dangerous situation when he awakens in the burning wreckage of the plane to find Bressler dead, and Pope unconscious. When Tom saves Pope's life, he then successfully leaves the area with Pope's help, evading Espheni forces along the way. Much to Tom's shock and dismay, when he awakens in the hospital in Charleston he learns from his sons that Anne and Alexis have fled Charleston due to the revelation of her baby being part alien, and she has been abducted by Karen.

During Tom's absence, his sons Hal, Ben, Matt and Maggie lead an initial search team to try to locate Anne and Alexis, but later return home to Charleston under the realization that the Espheni have them, and that the best course of action as suggested by Ben was to try and use the Rebel Skitters within the Espheni ranks to try to locate Anne and the baby.

When Tom has recovered enough to walk around and resume his duties, he is thrust into further danger when his son Hal, implanted with an Espheni eyebug, attacks him and Peralta as they are discussing the Volm weapon. To his horror, he finds himself abducted by Hal, who demands information on the Volm weapon, and ends up being held hostage in a nearby building which the 2nd Mass later surrounds. Coming to the realization that his son may end up being killed for being the mole, Tom attempts to connect with Hal by bringing up the past and his mother to defuse the situation without any loss of life. As the situation begins to escalate and Hal's demands of Tom to reveal the information on the weapon increase, his other two sons, Ben and Matt, enter the room along with Maggie, bringing the situation to a close. Tom later decides to go along with a dangerous remedy to cure Hal of the eyebug and invites him along on the search for Anne and Alexis.

He then makes the decision to step down as President of the New United States and offers up the information on the Volm weapon, which has been called Project Orange, to Peralta, knowing that she will be elected the next President, and she is sworn in during his departure from Charleston.

Tom then leads a rescue party out of Charleston consisting of himself, Hal, Matt and Ben to locate Anne and Alexis. During their journey they find themselves robbed of their supplies by a local family, the Picketts. After successfully retrieving the supplies, but with the unfortunate loss of one of the family members who had robbed them, they resume their search for Anne and Alexis. Tom later decides to return to the Pickett house to check on their well-being, after telling them about Charleston, but is ambushed by several Espheni mechs and skitters.

Now captured by Karen, Tom awakens in a dream world where the invasion has not happened and he and his wife and sons have been living a normal but happy life. As Tom continued to live out this false reality as a college professor, he starts to receive messages from Anne Glass but with no memory of her, the 2nd Mass or of the alien invasion; things around him start to fall apart. When three locations are made exceedingly clear to him during the dream, he later realizes what he has been seeing was not real and awakens inside an Espheni base in Boston. He then discovers that Karen was attempting to manipulate him into revealing what tower the 2nd Mass will attack during their operation. Shortly afterwards Tom is rescued and shoots Karen dead, when he awakens in Charleston and discovers he is still being manipulated by Karen. Finally awakening in the real world, Karen informs him to his despair that she had Anne and Alexis killed. After initially trying to attack Karen, Tom breaks down in tears and is then shown the activation of the Espheni planetary defense grid and is informed that within three months all life on Earth will be lost.

Realizing that he needs to return to Charleston, Tom then jumps from a ledge, evading the Espheni forces in the area and successfully returns to Charleston unharmed. Upon returning to Charleston Tom immediately reveals that Anne and Alexis had been killed, and the vulnerability of the Boston tower to assault. Fueled by a desire for revenge, Tom wants to lead a team once the weapon is ready to be deployed, but before he could act an explosion is felt in the Charleston area and Tom discovers that the Volm complex has been destroyed. After Tom discovers Cochise severely wounded, he helps him to the hospital and after being told his wounds will regenerate if left alone, he orders that he be left alone. When another explosion rocks Charleston, killing many and wounding others, Tom finds himself trapped underground and makes a horrifying discovery as he learns that Lourdes was the mole. After being taunted by a possessed Lourdes, Tom uses a Volm gun and makes an opening for himself and others to escape to the surface with.

While on the surface Tom and Cochise discuss the situation with the Volm weapon and come to the conclusion that the Volm weapon was adequately protected from the initial blast and that it should be just be a simple matter of digging it out. He then leads a team along with Cochise, Kadar and several members of the 2nd Mass on a boat with the weapon mounted onto it and attacks and successfully destroys the Boston tower, bringing down the Espheni planetary defense grid along with it. As a result, the Volm successfully land reinforcements on their city-sized ship in the area the tower once stood.

Believing the battle to be over for now Tom along with the other members of the 2nd Mass celebrate their victory but are left shocked when the Volm reveal their plans to relocate them to Brazil. Strongly opposed to this, Tom makes his feelings clear to the Volm commander who is revealed to be Cochise's father. After a minor disagreement, he is held captive and is visited by the Volm commander and explains that after everything that has happened, he along with the other members of the 2nd Mass wish to continue fighting the Espheni to the end and that he, and they wish to liberate the planet. The Volm commander understands Toms feelings and lets him go, and as the other members of the 2nd Mass are about to be taken away by Cochise and several other Volm, is informed that they are free to go.

Though somewhat concerned that the battle against the Espheni will be a three-way fight, Tom decides to travel back to Charleston along with the rest of the 2nd Mass but along the way is met by Karen, who informs him that the Volm can't be trusted and is later given Anne and Alexis in return as a sign of good faith. When Tom shoots Karen, after the dust had settled he reunites with Anne and Alexis and discovers that Alexis his daughter is now the size of a 6-year-old child. To his surprise he witnesses Alexis draw out and destroy the eyebugs inside Lourdes.

=== Season 4 ===
23 days later, Tom along with the 2nd Mass arrive back at Charleston, but before he can celebrate the group are attacked by Espheni ships and mechs, and are seemingly ensnared by the Espheni obelisks, Tom is separated from Anne, Lexi, Matt and Ben, and other members of the 2nd Mass.

4 months later, Tom is held in solitary confinement in an Espheni ghetto, a place set up by the Espheni for reasons he does not yet know, to hold prisoners, including Weaver, Pope, Hal, and other members of the 2nd Mass, and people who had been captured. When Weaver is held in a room next to his, Tom informs him that he is working on a plan to escape from the ghetto, and then reveals that he had been leaving confinement to gather more intelligence on the area, and the skitter locations. Fearing the area to be monitored by the Espheni, Tom covers his face before leaving confinement. However his actions which sometimes involved provoking the skitters, were not unnoticed by the Espheni, a single overlord aboard a ship monitoring the ghetto sends a message to an unknown person demanding that the vigilante, which some residents dub 'The Ghost' be handed over, or the residents of the ghetto will be killed.

Meanwhile, Tom learns from Cochise that the Volm had no choice but to leave the Earth, and have left behind several scout teams. He is then informed that the Espheni had set up ghettos all across the planet, for reasons he does not yet know, and that the Espheni are developing a new power source. Fearing the extinction of humanity, Cochise offers Tom words of support, and when Tom requests that he try to find Anne, Lexi, Matt, and Ben, he agrees.

Now freed from solitary confinement along with Weaver, he is then faced with an Espheni speaking through a harnessed child who tells him, along with the Ghettos residents that until the vigilante is handed over, the residents will receive no further food shipments. With their survival now in doubt, Tom discusses the situation with Weaver, who believes Pope may have a supply of food they could use.

Meanwhile, Tom meets up with Hal who tells him of the new escape plan, and together they meet with Dingaan Botha, who informs Tom that he had constructed a Faraday suit which can be used to scale the fence, and that he had escaped from an Espheni camp before. When he also is told of a working radio, he uses it to contact Cochise who tells him that the Espheni power source is offensive in nature, unlike the grid used before, and that he knows where Matt is being held. When Tom requests that he rescue Matt, he agrees.

Buoyed by the news about Matt, Tom decides to dress as the vigilante and hands himself over to the Overlord. Aboard the ship he learns that the Espheni plan to use humanity as hybrid soldiers in a new war, and is presented with a choice to save his family from the transformation, but when the Overlord gives him the choice between extinction or evolution, the ghettos residents dressed the Ghost, launch projectiles against the ship, during the chaos Tom uses the opportunity to study the camps layout and power source. When he later is released by the Overlord, Tom informs Hal and Weaver that he had promised not to resist anymore.

Faced with the news that humanity will be skitterized by the Espheni in the coming days, Tom puts the finishing touches on his escape plan with Dingaan, and then offers him a place among the 2nd Mass when they escape. Later that day, with Pope, Hal, Weaver, Tector and Digaan gathered, Tom, with a scale model of the ghetto in front of him, informs them that he will draw the attention of the ghettos skitter guards while Dingaan scales the fence. He then informs them that Hal will lead the ghettos residents into the tunnels in 15 man groups to avoid suspicion while Pope and Weaver cover for Dingaan, but faced with a skeptical Pope, Tom explains that when he manages to gather the skitters into one area, he will blow the building he was once held in with the explosive charges.

The next day, Tom meets with an Overlord and a harnessed child and informs them that the deal they had is now off, and that they should surrender, but when the Overlord threatens his life, he attacks it with a flamethrower and severely injures it. With the escape plan now in motion, Tom is now pursued by skitters and Pope is forced to scale the fence when Dingaans hand is injured, meanwhile Hal waits with the ghetto residents in the tunnels. With the fence now down, Tom leads the skitters to the building and blows it up and jumps into the water in triumph. That night, Tom reunites with Hal and the group and then thanks Pope for his part in the escape.

Now on the run from the Espheni and faced with increasing Beamer patrols, Tom arrives at the Volm hideout in an abandoned warehouse and is immediately greeted by Cochise. When Cochise explains that with the help of recon drones they now have Matts location, he decides to set out and rescue him. Weaver explains to Tom that he empathizes with how he must be feeling, and joins him. Tom then leaves Hal in charge of the group and tasks him with gathering supplies and ammunition. Now outside of the re education center, Cochise is forced into a meditative trance after being attacked by a mutated Jeanne Weaver, so Tom leaves him behind.

Inside the camp, when the children raise the alarm, Tom is forced to separate from Weaver and is led by Mira to Matts cell. He immediately rescues Matt who is being attacked by Kent Matthews by striking him, and with the help of Mira who distracts the skitters, leaves along with Matt. Shortly afterwards, Tom is reunited with an emotional Weaver who explains to him, Matt and Cochise what had happened with Jeanne. Though unbeknownst to Tom, he is currently being tracked by the scorched Overlord.

After three days of travel Tom arrives back at the Volm hideout with Matt, Cochise and Weaver, he notices the message left by Hal and takes measures to decipher it, he however is unaware that the Scorched Overlord along with several Skitters are patrolling the warehouse and is forced to make a quick retreat after learning where Hal was headed. Shortly afterwards, Cochise informs Tom that he needs to rejoin his recon team and then leaves. As Tom and the group make their way through the forest, they come across a camp inhabited by 2 men, who introduce themselves as Nick and Cooper, who are brothers. When they tell Tom that they had escaped from the Espheni, he's skeptical and voices his concerns to Weaver.

Tom is then abducted by the men who tell him the Espheni have a high price on his head, concerned for Matt, he attempts to talk with Cooper and tells him about how Matt was only 8 when the Espheni invaded. Cooper tells him that he had 2 sons who are now dead, as Tom continues to engage with him, he learns that Nick had caused the death of Coopers sons, which causes Cooper to kill Nick. As Cooper turns to kill Tom, Weaver shoots him dead. That night, he bonds with Matt and tells him about the meaning of family and brothers.

Now in Chinatown, Tom is reunited with his family and immediately asks Anne about Lexi, but before they can talk Lourdes interrupts and tells them that she's in a cocoon. He stops Anne from freeing her and tells her not to act irrationally as it may get Lexi killed. When Anne undergoes memory regression for answers, he spends time by Lexi's side and is joined by Weaver who offers him words of comfort. Later that night, Tom interrupts a 2nd Mass meeting and overhears Pope suggesting Lexi should be killed, he then warns them against acting and is told by Pope that there's clearly a conflict of interest going on. As he leaves, Hal tells him that they have a valid point but he doesn't listen, he tells him of his disgust that he was there. Realizing that people are scared of Lexi and that he may need to use force to protect her, he discusses the situation with Lourdes.

Warned by Ben who stands by his side, Tom is faced with an angry Pope and 2nd Mass members who demand access to Lexi. Tom defuses the situation by telling them should she become a monster, he will deal with her. He then hears from Anne before she puts her hand on the cocoon that Lexi needs her.

When Lexi emerges from her cocoon seemingly unchanged, Tom is faced with Lexi's proclamation that she is leaving Chinatown and then voices his concerns to her along with Anne, but she doesn't listen. He watches on as she walks into the crowd gathered outside and is shocked when Lexi kills Lourdes through pity. Believing that the Espheni may have done something to Lexi, Tom turns to Dr. Kadar and learns that she has changed at a cellular level.

Faced with an impending attack from the scorched Overlord, Tom tasks the 2nd Mass with laying traps around Chinatown and to prepare for a ground assault, he tells them that he believes they haven't attacked with Beamers as the Overlord is seeking vengeance against him. That night, the Espheni begin their ground assault and the 2nd Mass is hit with an explosion from a ruptured gas line that kills most of the group. With the survivors now gathered, Tom orders them to evacuate to an underground bomb shelter and tells them that the attack won't stop until the Espheni believe they are dead. But before Tom can evacuate himself, he is faced with tragedy when he discovers that Dr.Kadar has suffered a fatal shrapnel wound. With Dr.Kadar now dead, Tom becomes distressed by the deaths suffered during the attack and turns to Tector and asks him for his rifle to attack the Overlord. Tector however tricks Tom and sends him away before attacking the Overlord himself while dressed as the Ghost and then blows himself up.

With Chinatown now in ruin, Tom awakens under the rubble unharmed and discovers a distressed Dingaan while attempting to escape. Together they manage to find a crashed Beamer and are able to get inside. Believing that they may be able to use the Beamer to escape, Tom decides to investigate and is implanted with a parasite after touching a panel and tasks Dingaan with removing. However, when he accidentally triggers an onboard missile, Tom shields himself behind a panel along with Dingaan and anxiously awaits the explosion. When Dingaan tells him that the beeping sound reminded him of his wife's heart monitor before she died, Tom comforts him. He is then rescued when the explosion draws the 2nd Mass to them. Later that night, Tom and the 2nd Mass decide to gather around a camp fire to mourn the loss of Tector and Lourdes, and after learning that Ben had given some of his spikes to save Maggie, he then talks with Hal and they both notice a strange pulsating light on the Moon.

Believing the light on the Moon to be the Espheni power source, Tom decides that they need to dig the Beamer out of the rubble to use against it, but when he learns that they don't have the tools to do it quickly, Cochise tells him about a Volm supply cache that may hold something of use to help unearth the buried Beamer. He then decides to lead a small team consisting of himself, Anne, Matt, Weaver and Cochise. When Tom and the group arrive at the site Cochise informs him that they will need to wear gasmasks as the air is toxic where the cache is buried, they are then greeted by Mira who tells them that she had escaped the Espheni camp, Matt believes her but Tom is suspicious and ties her up before unearthing the cache. After hearing from Matt that Mira had escaped, Tom is attacked by Kent Matthews and with Annes help, he is able to shoot him dead. With the cache destroyed, Tom decides to head back to Chinatown with the group.

After the Beamer is inadvertently brought to life and flown out of the rubble, Tom is faced with uncertainty when the 2nd Mass demand that he should give them a chance to pilot the Beamer on the mission to the Moon. Tom is against the idea but is convinced by Anne to give them a vote, and tells them that anyone is free to put their name in contention for the role. That night, with the 2nd Mass gathered, Tom draws Bens name, and his own. He then admits to Anne that he had rigged the draw as he couldn't allow Ben to go without him. The next day, Tom and Ben prepare to enter the Beamer, but are interrupted when Beamers attack. He then watches on as Lexi destroys them.

Tom is angered by Lexi's return and she apologizes to him. Tom tells her that he doesn't want anything more to do with her, as she had betrayed both him and the 2nd Mass who he calls his family. Anne convinces him to give her a chance, and he allows her to join him on the mission to the moon. Believing Lexi to be a threat, Hal gives Tom a poison to use on her just in case. When the Beamer leaves the Earths atmosphere, he realizes that the life support system won't be able to maintain them both ways. Lexi suggests to him that they enter a cocoon together until they reach the Moon, to which he agrees. However he dreams that he's now back on Earth with the power core destroyed and the Espheni on the back foot and quickly realizes what he is experiencing is not real. Believing Lexi to be the cause, he demands that she release him. When they both have a father-daughter moment and reconcile the issues they once had, they awaken and discover they're now close to the Moon.

When their Beamer is captured by the Scorched Overlord, Tom decides to board the ship along with Lexi. While inside they are confronted by the Scorched Overlord who attacks Lexi and reveals his plan through Mira who is now harnessed to them both. Tom attacks the Overlord and injects him with a lethal Volm poison which kills him, but before he dies he destroys the ships auto pilot system to prevent them using against the power core. Tom however is told by Lexi to return to the Beamer and is distraught when he hears what he believes to be Lexi saying goodbye, she explains to him that as the auto pilot is destroyed she has no choice but to pilot the ship to destroy the core. Tom reluctantly says goodbye to Lexi, but they are attacked by a squadron of Beamers and are rescued by the Volm. Tom watches on as Lexi destroys the power core, but the explosion sends his Beamer spiraling into space out of control. He then awakens on a bed aboard an unknown spaceship and hears what he believes to be an old radio broadcast, immediately he decides to look around the room and realizes he's in space. He is then interrupted when an unknown alien makes their presence known, to which Tom responds with familiarity.

=== Season 5 ===
Tom is rescued from space by the Espheni's ancient enemy, the Dornia who tell him to find his inner warrior to defeat the Espheni once and for all before returning him to Earth. Guided by the Dornia who communicates with him in the image of his deceased wife Rebecca Mason, Tom rallies all the militias across the world into a global resistance to attack the Espheni bases and retake the planet. For his part, Tom leads a march on Washington, D.C. After an encounter with a militia running a witch hunt under the leadership of an Espheni clone, Tom learns of the existence of an Espheni queen when Ben uses an Espheni communications device. Shortly afterwards, Tom is approached by the Dornia who offer him a bioweapon that when used on the Espheni queen, will wipe the race out and free the Earth. Tom takes the weapon and has Anne and resistance fighter Marty work on modifying it so it's non-lethal to humans, but is confronted by the possible return of his daughter Alexis. Tom learns that the Espheni queen only comes to a planet when victory is certain and the Espheni are moving from invasion to occupation. Alexis also informs him that the Espheni have been to Earth before. Alexis, revealed to be an Espheni clone, attacks Tom, but is killed by Ben with the Dornia bioweapon before she can kill him. The next day, Tom leads an attack on Washington, D.C., having the militias attack an impenetrable defensive wall while he leads a strike team through the city's service tunnels to reach the queen herself. Tom is separated from the rest of the team by an explosion, but continues on alone and confronts the queen face to face in the ruins of the Lincoln Memorial. The queen explains to Tom that the invasion is revenge for the death of her daughter at the hands of humanity 1,500 years ago in another failed invasion. The queen starts draining Tom's blood, but he takes advantage of this and infects himself with the Dornia bioweapon. Thanks to the modifications Anne and Marty made to it, Tom is immune to the weapon's effects, but the virus passes through his blood into the Espheni queen, killing her. The bioweapon spreads through the queen's connection to her species and the Espheni are wiped out by the bioweapon, freeing Earth and humanity. Shortly afterwards, Tom learns that Anne has died and desperately takes her to the Dornia for help. As Tom awaits her return, a mortally injured John Pope, who has been seeking revenge against Tom, arrives but takes no pleasure in Tom's pain and lays down his weapon. Tom refuses to kill Pope since the war is over and he no longer has to kill anyone. Pope dies of his wounds and Anne is returned to Tom alive. Months later, Anne is pregnant with their second child and Tom rejects offers to be the new leader of a united humanity, saying that he is just a teacher. As humanity gathers at the rebuilt Lincoln Memorial, Tom gives a speech on how the Espheni invasion gave them a second chance as a species.

== Casting ==
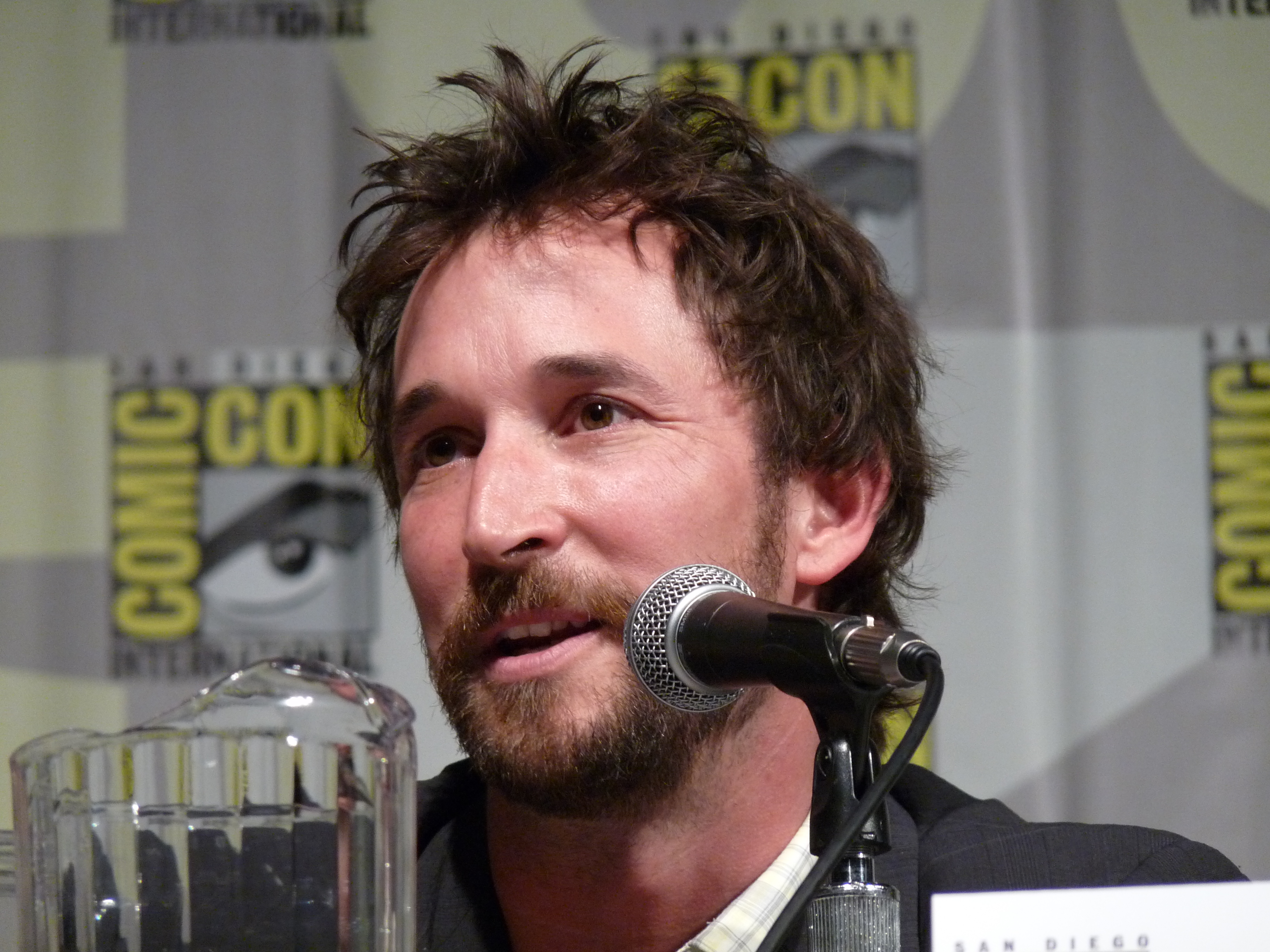
Wyle at the 2010 San Diego Comic-Con promoting the series.

One of the things that was most attractive about it was shooting 10 episodes as opposed to 24, which affords me a bit of quality-of-life and allows me to have a presence in my kids' lives. But in terms of quality of writing, this was great writing. Mark Verheiden's a great writer. I enjoy this kind of storytelling just as much as all of those years on "ER."

— Noah Wyle, on why he chose the role

Noah Wyle was announced as the lead in the series in June 2009. He has previously worked with TNT on The Librarian films and was sent scripts for various shows on their network. Wyle said part of the reason he chose the part was to gain credibility from his children. He said "...with the birth of my kids, I started to really look at my career through their eyes more than my own, so that does dictate choice, steering me toward certain things and away from other things." He also decided to do it as he could relate with his character, stating "I identified with Tom's devotion to his sons, and admired his sense of social duty." Spielberg wanted Wyle for the role because he knew him from his previous series ER, which Spielberg's company produced. He had wanted Wyle to appear in his 1998 film Saving Private Ryan but due to scheduling conflicts, he was unable to star. Spielberg stated that he was determined to work with him again.

== Reception ==
=== Accolades ===
Wyle was nominated for a Saturn Award in the category for Best Actor in Television.
