= The Armory (Falling Skies) =

- Falling Skies episode
- Tom and his team go in search for Ben.
- Episode no.: Season 1 Episode 2
- Directed by: Greg Beeman
- Written by: Graham Yost
- Production code: 102
- Original air date: June 19, 2011

Guest appearances
- Bruce Gray as Uncle Scott; Dale Dye as Col. Porter; Martin Roach as Mike

Episode chronology
← Previous "Live and Learn"	Next → "Prisoner of War"
- Falling Skies season 1

"The Armory" is the second episode of the first season of the TNT science fiction drama Falling Skies, which originally aired June 19, 2011, alongside the pilot episode. The episode was written by Graham Yost and directed by Greg Beeman.

Weaver sends Tom and a squad to scout out a possible weapons armory, but they are taken hostage by a group of outlaws who then try to use Tom and his team as leverage to acquire food and weapons. The trade is interrupted by an alien ship, which kills most of the outlaws. Their leader, Pope, is taken into custody. Margaret, another one of the outlaws, agrees to fight for the 2nd Mass and help Tom find his enslaved son Ben, who was seen at a nearby hospital only days before.

In the United States, the two-hour series premiere achieved a viewership of 5.91 million, making it the most-watched series premiere of 2011. The episode received a 2.0 rating in the 18–49 demographic, translating to 2.6 million viewers according to the Nielsen ratings.

== Plot ==
At the armory, Tom and the other members gather to see if aliens are present. They use a dog as bait, and a Mech was already waiting for them, forcing the group to retreat when the Mech attacks them.

The next morning, Tom informs Weaver about the previous night's events. He tells Tom to return tonight. Anne then confronts Weaver about the current sleeping situation, where civilians are living in tents and the fighters in houses. Anne deems it unfair, yet Weaver believes the soldiers need proper rest.

Later that night, the group returns to the Armory; however, they are ambushed by a group of outlaws who capture the group. The outlaws, led by a man named John Pope, tied them up. Pope interrogates them and Tom responds to all his answers. Pope pulls a gun on Tom, but Hal tells him that they can help him get weapons. Hal is led out of the auditorium by Margaret, a woman in Pope's gang, who gives him one hour to go back and get guns from the 2nd Mass.

Hal returns and informs Weaver about the situation. Weaver says they will not trade with Pope and orders Mike to take Hal upstairs as a prisoner until they are ready to leave. Mike, however, allows Hal to leave and on the way, Hal runs into Anne, who offers her assistance. They both return to find Margaret who escorts them back to Pope. Anne offers her assistance to Pope's wounded brother, Billy. She bandages up his leg and Pope leaves him, Cueball, and Margaret in charge of the prisoners as he and his other outlaws attempt to rob the 2nd Mass. However, Margaret kills Billy and Cueball before letting the hostages go.

Meanwhile, Pope sends a flare into the air to alert the airships, giving Weaver an ultimatum. Weaver reluctantly agrees and hands over food and ammunition. As Pope and his group load up the car, Tom and the other militia fire at them. Tom offers him an ultimatum to join the 2nd Mass. or die with the airship. Pope declines and waits for the aliens' attack. An airship flies above Pope, who drives away, allowing his men to be killed by the ships. Pope pulls aside not far away, trying to escape, but Weaver pulls a gun on him, taking him prisoner.

The next day, Weaver talks to Tom about the events that occurred the previous night. He then hands Pope over to Tom, who puts him in custody. Afterward, Margaret leads Tom in search of Ben at a local hospital.

== Production ==
=== Development ===
The episode was written by Graham Yost and directed by Greg Beeman. This marks Beeman's first directional episode of the series. He later goes on to direct the third episode in the series, Prisoner of War and the season finale, Eight Hours. The episode was filmed in July 2010, a year before the episode's original airing. Greg Beeman stated that his first big project in the episode was to occupy an entire neighborhood. He needed to find an area that showed "No sign of humanity besides our fighters. That means we could see no cars driving by, no planes flying by, no incidental pedestrians, etc, etc… Sometimes we had to take these kinds of things out digitally – but, mostly, we had to figure out ways to frame them out."

John Pope is introduced in the episode.

The Armory marks the first appearance of Colin Cunningham's character John Pope and Sarah Carter's character, Margaret. Pope is the leader of a post-apocalyptic gang and Margaret is a woman who used to be part of the gang. She helped Tom and his team escape after Pope holds them hostage.

== Reception ==
=== Ratings ===
In its original American broadcast, the two-hour premiere of Falling Skies was seen by an estimated 5.9 million household viewers, according to Nielsen Media Research, making it cable television's #1 series launch of the year. It also delivered more than 2.6 million adults 18–49 and 3.2 million adults 25–54.

=== Reviews ===
At review aggregator Metacritic the first season scored 71%, based on 26 critic reviews, indicating "generally favorable reviews".

Tim Goodman of The Hollywood Reporter wrote "...the entertainment value and suspense of Falling Skies is paced just right. You get the sense that we'll get those answers eventually. And yet, you want to devour the next episode immediately." Thomas Conner of the Chicago Sun-Times called it "...a trustworthy family drama but with aliens." He continued, "It's 'Jericho' meets 'V', with the good from both and the bad discarded. It'll raise the summer-TV bar significantly." Ken Tucker from Entertainment Weekly gave the series a B+ and wrote, "A similar, gradually developed, but decisive conviction makes Falling Skies an engaging, if derivative, chunk of dystopian sci-fi." He continued, "...Falling Skies rises above any one performance; it's the spectacle of humans versus aliens that draws you in."
