= Mutiny (Falling Skies) =

- Falling Skies episode
- Tom escapes from capture and confronts Weaver.
- Episode no.: Season 1 Episode 9
- Directed by: Holly Dale
- Written by: Joe Weisberg
- Production code: 109
- Original air date: August 7, 2011

Episode chronology
← Previous "What Hides Beneath"	Next → "Eight Hours"
- Falling Skies season 1

"Mutiny" is the ninth episode of the first season of the TNT science fiction drama Falling Skies, which originally aired August 7, 2011, alongside the season finale.

== Plot ==
It now seems likely that not only was Colonel Porter killed recently, but that the 4th and 5th Mass met the same fate as the 7th Mass. Moreover, the aliens have started mysteriously pulling back all of their patrols to form a more secure defensive perimeter around Boston. While the 2nd Mass has scored some victories against the aliens, considering the losses the other militias seem to have taken, it is considered unlikely that the aliens are simply trying to preserve thinning resources. Rather, it is speculated that alien reinforcements must be coming to Earth soon, so their new plan is to just focus on defending their "beachheads" in the massive command towers they have deployed in major cities. When the reinforcements arrive, they will start a huge offensive against the human militias. Therefore, Weaver becomes determined that they must make an all-or-nothing assault on the command tower in Boston, while they still can.

Tom discovers that Weaver surreptitiously obtained drugs - sedatives and stimulants - from Lourdes some time ago and has been taking them since. Tom confronts him about this and questions his mental state, his ability to lead the fighters and help the civilians, and his orders to continue the attack in the face of heavy odds. but Weaver reacts by ordering Tom locked up. Tom manages to escape with Hal and Jimmy's help, confronts Weaver and convinces him to improve his original plan. Tom respects Captain Weaver for keeping all of the civilians alive and organizing the militias after the first chaotic weeks of the invasion, so he gives Weaver a chance to come clean to the 2nd Mass. When Weaver and Tom are walking to the assembly, it is revealed by Weaver that he stopped taking the drugs after the incident in Boston, where he discovered his daughter's glasses. Weaver admits to the assembled group that they have received no contact from the 4th and 5th Mass militias, making it look increasingly probable that Colonel Porter is dead. Without these reinforcements, the 2nd Mass will be heavily outnumbered by itself, and the mission is probably suicidal.

In another development, while Uncle Scott and Ben are working to disrupt the Skitters' transmissions, Ben discovers he is sensitive to certain frequencies in a way which might be used as a weapon against the Skitters.

Despite the negatives, Weaver insists that he still wants to press the attack, defending his determination to do so by pointing out that if alien reinforcements are indeed coming soon, and the other militias have been destroyed, that they might never get another chance to hit the aliens. It's either that or sit around and wait for death. Even if the assault is suicidal, they have to try, and their sacrifice will inspire other resistance fighters and their children to keep fighting the aliens, no matter how long it takes. Weaver apologizes for hiding the full extent of the bad news from the 2nd Mass, then asks for 50 volunteer fighters, who now know what they are facing. Many volunteer, including Pope, and the group set off hoping that the reinforcements might still show up. Their plan is to fight their way to the support-pillars of the alien command tower in central Boston, then use Pope's home-made demolition charges to take it out.

== Reception ==
=== Ratings ===
In its original American broadcast, the two-hour season finale received 5.6 million viewers, the highest rated episode since the series premiere; with 2.5 million viewers in the 18–49 demographic. Both episodes scored a 1.9 ratings share in the 18-49 demographic.

=== Reviews ===
Ryan McGee of the A.V. Club gave the episode a B grade. Eric Goldman of IGN said of the finale "The two-hour Falling Skies: Season 1 finale displayed the strengths and weaknesses of the show so far in notable ways." He continued "Falling Skies has kinks to work out to be sure, but it continues to show potential. Here's hoping it hits the ground running in Season 2 next year." He gave the episode a rating of 7.5/10.
