= Josh Pate =

Josh Pate may refer to:

- Josh Pate (sports commentator), American college football analyst
- Josh Pate (screenwriter) (born 1970), American film director
