= Prisoner of War (Falling Skies) =

- Falling Skies episode
- Hal and Karen are ambushed by a Mech.
- Episode no.: Season 1 Episode 3
- Directed by: Greg Beeman
- Written by: Fred Golan
- Production code: 103
- Original air date: June 26, 2011

Guest appearances
- Bruce Gray as Uncle Scott; Dale Dye as Col. Porter; Martin Roach as Mike; Steven Weber as Dr. Harris

Episode chronology
| ← Previous "The Armory" | Next → "Grace" |
- Falling Skies season 1

"Prisoner of War" is the third episode of the first season of the TNT science fiction drama Falling Skies, which originally aired June 26, 2011. The episode was written by Fred Golan and directed by Greg Beeman.

The 2nd Mass is joined by Dr. Michael Harris, the only doctor to have discovered how to safely unharness enslaved children. A failed attempt to reclaim Tom's son Ben leaves Hal and his girlfriend Karen at the mercy of the aliens. A Skitter later orders a Mech to kill the remaining kids in front of Hal, then releases Hal to deliver a message: take one, the rest die.

== Plot ==
Tom's group and Margaret discover kids with harnesses collecting scrap metal for the aliens. Tom sees his son, Ben, and the group prepares to grab him. Karen accidentally knocks a loose piece of rock from the building, alerting the aliens and the group runs away.

Back at the school, Col. Porter tells Tom that a doctor has a theory on how to remove the harnesses and that he wants to test it on Ben. Col. Porter informed the 2nd Mass. that due to electronic communications being destroyed after the Skitters detonated their EMP attack at the start of the invasion, the resistance had to rely on sending scouts to physically try to find out more information, and the runners have finally returned. Porter reports that they contacted another human resistance militia. The Massachusetts resistance cell is no longer alone, and they are going to begin coordinating a nationwide guerrilla war against the aliens. Col. Porter says this means they have to start thinking tactically, gathering reconnaissance on Skitter tactics, technology, and troop deployments.

Tom learns that the doctor Porter bringing in was Harris, an old friend of him and his late wife, Rebecca and the two of them discuss Ben.

Tom's group goes to find Ben, but Mike sees his son and snaps, running toward him, grabbing his son before Skitters and Mechs attack them. Hal and Karen were separated while Tom was forced to flee with Mike and his son. While Mike heads back to the school, Tom goes to find Hal and Karen, and is attacked by a Skitter. Tom shoots its legs off and beats it half-to-death. Tom returns to the school with the Skitter as a prisoner of war.

Meanwhile, Hal sees the harnessed kids taking the unconscious Karen away before a Mech and Skitter gather a group of kids and the Mech executes them right in front of Hal.

Dr. Harris successfully removes the harness from Mike's son, with the help of Anne, and Lourdesm but it is impossible to remove the tips of the needles that have fused into the child's spine: the points of the needles have nanotechnology that grows into the spine the longer it is present.

Tom finds Hal alive and Hal tells his father what he witnessed. Tom recites that the humans used similar tactics: if one prisoner managed to escape, they would execute entire groups but leave one witness behind, to let the enemies know the harsh reprisal they would exact. The Skitters let Hal escape because they want to discourage the human resistance from attempting to free more harnessed children.

Tom returns to the school and finds Anne. He reveals that Hal blames himself for Karen's abduction and is not taking it well. Tom asks Anne where he can find Dr. Harris. Harris drinks, watching the captured Skitter. Tom confronts him about his deceased wife. It is revealed that Harris abandoned Tom's wife and left her to die when the attacks began.

== Production ==
=== Development ===
The episode was written by Fred Golan and directed by Greg Beeman. Beeman previously directed the second episode, The Armory. He later goes on to direct the season finale, Eight Hours.

Beeman stated in his director's blog that executive producer Graham Yost was overseeing the script at the point the episode hit production. Yost wanted to open the episode with a scene on a rooftop, as did Beeman. The Director of Photography, Chris Faloona and Beeman's production designer, Rob Gray "all wanted to go on the roof". They agreed the visual scope was a much better way to open the episode. They went onto the roof and designed every shot a shooting sequence that would be most efficient.

For the fight in the tunnel, Beeman said "The writer's came up with a concept that our heroes travel through abandoned sewer tunnels to travel between the school and the main part of the city." They found an old abandoned glass factory. "It was an above-ground tunnel - but when blacked in and lit correctly it looked perfect." Since he was directing both episodes, Beeman "shot the tunnel scenes for both episodes at the same time." (In the second episode, Pope takes Tom and his team hostage through a tunnel). For the actual Skitter attack, the alien took 5 puppeteers to work it. The main one was a man who was in the suit. Two were working radio controls to operate its facial expressions and two more were needed to puppetteer its legs.

== Reception ==
=== Ratings ===
In its original American broadcast, "Prisoner of War" was seen by an estimated 4.20 million household viewers, according to Nielsen Media Research. It marked a significant drop in viewership compared to the previous week's double episode, series premiere "Live and Learn" and "The Armory", which were both seen by 5.91 million household viewers. "Prisoner of War" received a 1.5 rating among viewers between ages 18 and 49.

=== Reviews ===
Seeing the skitter run (skit?) across the ceiling was one of the more impressive visuals on the show so far, and it was very interesting to see Tom not only turn the tables on the thing but go to town on it, beating the hell out of it in a manner that proved he has some (understandable) bottled up rage ready to let loose.

— Eric Goldman, IGN

Ryan McGee of The A.V. Club awarded the episode with a B grade, stating: "Falling Skies premiered last week with a two-hour block that wasn’t so much an extended pilot but two episodes that to happened air [sic] on the same night. That’s not necessarily a bad thing: While the first hour hummed along at a decent but semi-predictable pace, the second hour featured a fascinating detour into a high school that was more chamber drama than alien invasion. “Prisoner of War” returns to the format of the first hour, with an established theme depicted in the show’s title and a singular mission played out on multiple fronts. If anything stood out in this latest hour, it’s how shamelessly this show wears its narrative antecedents on its sleeve."

Alan Sepinwall of HitFix said of the episode: "...there were some discussion-worthy things in "Prisoner of War," and I'm also curious to see ongoing reaction to the show..." He stated that he enjoyed the scene where the Skitter attacks Tom, stating, "Noah Wyle takes out a skitter singlehanded! Tom dragging the creature through the school was a nice moment (if, like most of the series, borrowed from another alien invasion story, in this case Will Smith in the desert in "Independence Day"), and I remain impressed by the effects work on the creature itself.

Matt Richenthal from TV Fanatic stated: "Falling Skies delivered my favorite hour of the opening three via "Prisoner of War." Not only did it shed new light on Tom - his overwhelming guilt at accidentally abandoning Hal made even more sense when we learned how his wife died - but it gave us plenty of insight into those invading Skitters."
