= What Hides Beneath =

- Falling Skies episode
- Episode no.: Season 1 Episode 8
- Directed by: Anthony Hemingway
- Written by: Mark Verheiden
- Production code: 108
- Original air date: July 31, 2011

Episode chronology
← Previous "Sanctuary"	Next → "Mutiny"
- Falling Skies season 1

"What Hides Beneath" is the eighth episode of the first season of the TNT science fiction drama Falling Skies, which originally aired July 31, 2011. The episode was written by Mark Verheiden and directed by Anthony Hemingway.

== Plot ==
Col. Porter arrives at the school to inform Weaver and Tom that the 7th Mass was confirmed to be wiped out by the Skitters and that there was no contact with the 4th and the 5th Mass. The Skitters are regrouping to the alien structure in the ruins of Boston, along with other cities, and he informs both Weaver and Tom that they're going to coordinate an offensive against the Skitters at the structure within four days, so he needs the 2nd Mass. to scout for routes that leads to the structure and attack them. Pope, who had previous knowledge of explosives during his time as a convict, was chosen to make bombs for the offensive.

Meanwhile, Weaver is disturbed when he sees Rick drawing one of the houses he used to live in, and volunteers to join the scouting mission with Tom and Hal. While scouting the Skitter command tower in downtown Boston, Tom, Hal, and Weaver spot a tall, humanoid alien species directing Skitters, revealing them to be the master race commanding the Skitters. They also learned that the aliens were using Earth's materials for construction, which is why they are using the harnessed kids as labor for collecting scrap metal and raw materials.

While returning to base, the scouting team meets a strange woman who invites them into her home. Tom and Hal take up her offer while Weaver guards their motorbikes. However, Weaver takes off, leaving Tom and Hal behind. They eventually track him down to his old house where Tom finds him drinking. Weaver explains that he had separated from his wife before the invasion and couldn't find her when the attack began. He found his younger daughter harnessed and inadvertently killed her when he attempted to remove it. A Mech shows up, forcing Hal to hide and Tom and Weaver to work together to destroy it. Realizing that the only person who knew their location was the strange woman they met earlier, they return to her apartment and discover she is an agent of the Skitters who use her to capture people. Karen, Hal's girlfriend, who has now been harnessed, comes and answers the woman along with one of the new tall aliens. Deciding that the woman - who seems mentally disturbed after losing her family in the invasion - cannot be trusted, Tom lies to her about the direction they are actually heading as they leave.

Meanwhile, at the school, Dr. Anne discovers that the Skitters have harnesses too after performing an autopsy on the dead Skitter she killed earlier, meaning that the Skitters are also being controlled. Pope and Matt, Tom's youngest son, discovered that the Mechs were using human-caliber bullets and replaced them with their own metal, so Pope came up with an idea to use the metal from the destroyed Mechs as an armor-piercing round. Pope demonstrates that a bullet made out of Mech armor can penetrate the Mech itself. Weaver orders them to start melting as much Mech-metal as they have into bullets, which will even the odds against the aliens. Rick, who observed this, takes off, followed by Ben.

== Reception ==
=== Ratings ===
In its original American broadcast, "What Hides Beneath" was seen by an estimated 4.31 million household viewers, according to Nielsen Media Research. The episode received a 1.5 rating among viewers between ages 18 and 49; the highest-rated episode since the series premiere.

=== Reviews ===
Eric Goldman of IGN gave the episode a score of 8 out of 10, enjoying Weaver's storyline. "The fact that Weaver, in his attempt to remove a harness from his daughter, ended up killing her was an incredibly dark and bleak aspect to add to the character – and a very compelling one," he said.
