= Silent Kill =

- Falling Skies episode
- Tom thanks Anne for saving Ben.
- Episode no.: Season 1 Episode 5
- Directed by: Fred Toye
- Written by: Joe Weisberg
- Production code: 105
- Original air date: July 10, 2011

Guest appearances
- Bruce Gray as Uncle Scott; Steven Weber as Dr. Harris

Episode chronology
← Previous "Grace"	Next → "Sanctuary"
- Falling Skies season 1

"Silent Kill" is the fifth episode of the first season of the TNT science fiction drama Falling Skies, which originally aired July 10, 2011. The episode was written by Joe Weisberg and directed by Fred Toye.

== Plot ==
Hal and Margaret return to the school after scouting the area near the hospital where the drugs they need are kept. They hand the drugs over to Anne for the operation. Anne speaks to Tom about the risks of the procedure, letting him know that there is a chance Ben could die.

Later, Scott tells Tom that he can try and pick up a Skitter transmission on his radio as the Skitters communicate using radio waves. However, just one Skitter in the hospital will not be transmitting.

Tom and Hal practice shooting targets with crossbows as a crossbow can kill a Skitter silently. Margaret offers her assistance and tells Tom that she knows the layout of the hospital where Ben is kept.

Dr. Harris prepares to inject the Skitter with a lethal serum. He fails to do so and the Skitter kills him. After this, Weaver tells his soldiers that the Skitter needs to die. Anne asks for more time to study it and Weaver gives her 24 hours.

Hal speaks to Rick who sits quietly on a bench outside. Hal asks him about the "harness" and the Skitters. Rick tells Hal that if they go and find Ben, they will be killed. Hal then comes up with a new plan for rescuing Ben, wearing a "harness" himself to avoid detection. Tom protests against this idea, but Hal convinces him. The pair goes to see Anne, who tells them of the "pressure point" that Dr. Harris found earlier when Mike knocked the Skitter out. She tests this theory by shoving her scalpel in its mouth, driving it hard enough that she penetrates the soft tissue into the brain and kills it.

Later that night, Tom's group arrives at the hospital. Hal enters the hospital and finds a group of kids following a Skitter and he joins them. When the kids and the Skitter are asleep, Hal successfully stabs the Skitter in its mouth and kills it. The group then escapes, bringing the kids with them.

Anne begins to operate on the kids. She removes most of the harnesses successfully, but one child dies. Ben wakes up later, apparently recognizing his father.

== Production ==
=== Development ===
Silent Kill was written by Joe Weisberg and directed by Fred Toye. Toye previously directed the fourth episode, Grace. This is the first episode that Joe Weisberg wrote. He later writes the ninth episode, Mutiny.

The scene where Hal enters the hospital with Rick's harness was shot in an abandoned hospital in Toronto. During the scene where the actors had to react to the mech walking by, a crewmember walked through the space with a large pole with a light on it. This gave the actors the basic size and speed to track to. A scene was later shot without the crew member. Whenever the mech was meant to contact the shrubbery, the effects crew attached fishing lines to the bushes, which were shaken in sync with when the interaction was meant to happen.

== Reception ==
=== Ratings ===
In its original American broadcast, "Silent Kill" was seen by an estimated 3.90 million household viewers, according to Nielsen Media Research. The episode received a 1.4 rating among viewers between ages 18 and 49.

=== Reviews ===
Ryan McGee from The A.V. Club gave the episode a B−, stating: "...since this show will certainly have time to improve itself now that there’s definitely a second season, let’s hope the show figures out how to excise what currently holds the show back from being more than simple summer entertainment."

Matt Richenthal of TV Fanatic said: "We're never far removed from the heart of the series. Tom isn't running around screaming, shooting, panicking. He's just a loving father, never failing to be there for his kids, who has been thrust into the role of quasi action hero. He also seems to have come a long way from the premiere, when he said his wife always said the right thing to their sons. Tom did a pretty solid job here with Hal, didn't he?"
