= Eight Hours =

- Falling Skies episode
- A harnessed Karen speaks to Tom about Ben's condition.
- Episode no.: Season 1 Episode 10
- Directed by: Greg Beeman
- Written by: Mark Verheiden
- Production code: 110
- Original air date: August 7, 2011

Episode chronology
← Previous "Mutiny"	Next → "Worlds Apart"
- Falling Skies season 1

"Eight Hours" is the tenth episode of the first season of the TNT science fiction drama Falling Skies and the season finale, which originally aired August 7, 2011, alongside the ninth episode.

In the episode, Weaver leads several squads of fighters to attack the aliens and Tom remains behind to help protect the civilians as they evacuate the school.

The episode was well received by television critics, with many praising the final scene. It was watched by 5.6 million viewers, the highest-rated episode since the series premiere; with 2.5 million viewers in the 18–49 demographic.

== Plot ==
Rick runs off to rejoin the Skitters and meets Megan, whose body is slowly changing under the influence of the harness. Speaking for the Skitters, she promises to lead him to them if he tells her everything he knows about the 2nd Mass. However, after doing this, she departs, leaving him feeling betrayed by the Skitters. On learning that the Skitters know the whereabouts of the 2nd Mass, Tom decides to evacuate the civilians while leaving a small force behind.

While Weaver's strike team are away, the 2nd Mass comes under attack from Skitter Mechs, but Scott and Ben save the day by finding and transmitting the right frequency to confuse the aliens. Many Mechs are destroyed using the new armor-piercing Mech-metal tipped rounds. For the first time, the aliens retreat in the face of human resistance.

When neither the 4th nor 5th Mass. militias arrive by the designated time, and are presumed destroyed, Weaver believes that his attack will turn into a suicide mission, but they still have to try. Weaver sends Hal back to the 2nd Mass to report the tactical situation, and to tell everyone that the fighters of the 2nd Mass. went down fighting.

Returning to the strike force, Tom finds that it was decimated without the expected reinforcements. He finds Pope caring for a wounded Anthony, and tells him to carry him back to base. As Pope leaves, he presents Tom with a rocket-propelled grenade launcher, equipped with a special grenade that he encased entirely in Mech-metal. Tom then finds Weaver, unconscious in a crashed truck. As they approach the Skitters' base, both realize the hopelessness of achieving the mission, and as a "send-off" Tom randomly shoots a Skitter airship with the special RPG. However, because the airship had been making an approach to land, its wreck crashes into the Skitter's hangar deck, setting off a chain reaction of secondary explosions in fuel and munitions stored there, culminating in a spectacular explosion that severely damages the structure. Shocked, both men flee the city.

On the way back to the 2nd Mass Tom and Weaver are blocked by Karen who has been captured and now wears a harness. She tells them the aliens had not expected such a high level of resistance and this had intrigued them; they want to talk. Weaver and Tom are furious that the aliens have the nerve to try negotiation after everything they have done now that Earth is proving not the easy target they thought. An alien ship lands and Tom is asked to come aboard. He agrees only after being told it is the only way to save Ben from the transition that is befalling him. The episode ends with Tom taking Karen's hand and leaving a shocked Weaver behind.

== Reception ==
=== Ratings ===
In its original American broadcast, the two-hour season finale received 5.6 million viewers, the highest-rated episode since the series premiere; with 2.5 million viewers in the 18–49 demographic. Both episodes scored a 1.9 ratings share in the 18-49 demographic.

=== Reviews ===
Ryan McGee of the A.V. Club gave the episode a B grade. Eric Goldman of IGN said of the finale "The two-hour Falling Skies: Season 1 finale displayed the strengths and weaknesses of the show so far in notable ways." He continued "Falling Skies has kinks to work out to be sure, but it continues to show potential. Here's hoping it hits the ground running in Season 2 next year." He gave the episode a rating of 7.5/10.
