= Live and Learn (Falling Skies) =

- Falling Skies episode
- Tom Mason (Noah Wyle) is made second-in-command of the 2nd Mass, a group of soldiers and civilians.
- Episode no.: Season 1 Episode 1
- Directed by: Carl Franklin
- Written by: Robert Rodat
- Production code: 101
- Original air date: June 19, 2011

Guest appearances
- Bruce Gray as Uncle Scott; Dale Dye as Col. Porter; Martin Roach as Mike

Episode chronology
← Previous —	Next → "The Armory"
- Falling Skies season 1

"Live and Learn" is the first episode of the first season and the series premiere of the TNT science fiction drama Falling Skies. The episode was written by series creator and executive producer Robert Rodat and directed by Carl Franklin. The episode first aired in the United States on June 19, 2011, alongside the second episode.

Six months after an extraterrestrial invasion, history professor Tom Mason is made second-in-command of the 2nd Mass, a group of soldiers and civilians. Weaver, 2nd Mass' commanding officer, sends Tom, Hal and a small group of soldiers on a mission for supplies for the rest of the troop. While on the mission, Hal catches a glimpse of his missing brother Ben, who has been enslaved by the aliens.

In the United States, the two-hour series premiere achieved a viewership of 5.91 million, making it the most-watched series premiere of 2011. The episode received a Nielsen rating of 2.0 in the 18–49 demographic, translating to 2.6 million viewers.

== Plot ==
Six months ago, Earth was invaded by aliens called the Skitters, disabling most electronics with a EMP blast followed by destroying all the military bases and major cities around the world before Skitters abduct kids and infuse them with harnesses.

Tom Mason and his eldest son, Hal, look for food but are ambushed by robotic "Mechs." They are forced to retreat with Captain Weaver as an airship launches a nuke that destroys most of Boston.

After regrouping in their base, Tom is then called by Col. Porter for a meeting. Porter discusses his plan to leave the city and break off into smaller groups because the alien airships can detect larger group of humans. He puts Weaver in charge of the 2nd Mass and Tom as his second-in-command.

The following day, the fighters and civilians begin to move. They search for food in stores but find none. Weaver tells Tom that they can't go back looking for more food as the numbers are too large. Tom volunteers to go back, and Weaver gives him six fighters, including his son Hal and his girlfriend, Karen. While Hal and Karen take point to search for aliens, Hal sees a platoon of harnessed kids with them, including his younger brother, Ben. He and Karen immediately return to tell his father; yet Tom insists that they stick with the mission.

The group finds a supply store with food and scouts the area for aliens. Finding none, they load the food into the truck. As they are loading the food, the group is ambushed by a Skitter and a Mech. Tom destroys the Mech with C-4 before the group kills the Skitter.

The six fighters return and Tom informs Weaver of their success. He then tells Weaver that he and Hal must go looking for Ben. Weaver declines and says they must raid an armory for weapons and ammunition. Regardless, Tom vows that after they take the armory, they will go and find his son.

== Production ==
=== Conception ===
Development officially began in 2009, when TNT announced that it had ordered to pilot an untitled alien invasion project. Falling Skies was created by Robert Rodat, who is best known for writing the Oscar-winning film Saving Private Ryan, which was directed by Steven Spielberg. Rodat wrote the pilot episode from an idea which was co-conceived by Spielberg. Originally, Falling Skies was called Concord, referencing the Battles of Lexington and Concord and Tom Mason's profession as a former History Professor. Spielberg then came up with the title Falling Skies. "I felt that this was a very interesting postapocalyptic story with a 21st century [spin on the] spirit of '76. I came up — out of the blue one day — with the name Falling Skies, which is basically what happens to the planet after this invasion. What is unique about this particular series is that the story starts after a successful conquest of the world," he stated. Spielberg was attracted to the project due to its themes of survival. "I've always been interested in how we survive and how resourceful we are as Americans. How would the survivors feed the children? How do they resupply themselves militarily in order to defend and even take back what they have lost?" he added. Like much of Spielberg's work, such as The Pacific and E.T. the Extra-Terrestrial, Falling Skies' running theme is family and brotherhood. He explained, "It's a theme I harken back to a lot because it's something I believe in. It's something I have the closest experience with. [Laughs] They say write what you know, and with seven children and three sisters... I tend to always come back to the family as a touchstone for audiences to get into these rather bizarre stories."

While writing the pilot, Rodat dedicated a five-page montage to the alien invasion, but decided not to go through with it as it had been done before in films such as War of the Worlds. "I wrote a few drafts of it and I looked at and say, 'Ay-yay-yay, I’ve seen this before. There's no emotion to this. It feels like one of those montages,'" he said. Rodat came up with the idea of having the children in the series "harnessed by aliens". "When we were working out the initial stuff, the thing that excited [Spielberg] was the idea that adults are killed if they're a threat, and kids are captured for whatever reason and changed or altered. The harness was a logical outgrowth of that. Then what we’ll explore is what the harnessing does to the kid over the course of the show but that also is something that's going to have to unveil itself gradually," he stated. Spielberg previously explored the idea of enslaved children in the 1984 film Indiana Jones and the Temple of Doom.

Spielberg's fingerprints are all over this. He shaped the script, cast the pilot, watched all the dailies, made the editing suggestions, worked on the post and on the aliens and spaceships.

— Series lead, Noah Wyle

Series lead Noah Wyle emphasized Spielberg's presence on set by stating "Anytime he gives an anointment to a project, it steps up the pedigree." Colin Cunningham, who plays outlaw John Pope, exclaimed "You'd show up and think, ‘This is not a TV show; this is something else that we're doing,’ " he said, noting that Spielberg was very hands-on for the pilot. "Its scope is massive. Anytime you hear the word Spielberg, you know it's not going to be crap; you know it’ll be quality and there will be some money behind it." Mark Verheiden, who was the showrunner for the first season, stated "It's great to know you have a world-class filmmaker backing up what you're trying to do who is supportive and helping design the great stuff."

=== Casting and filming ===
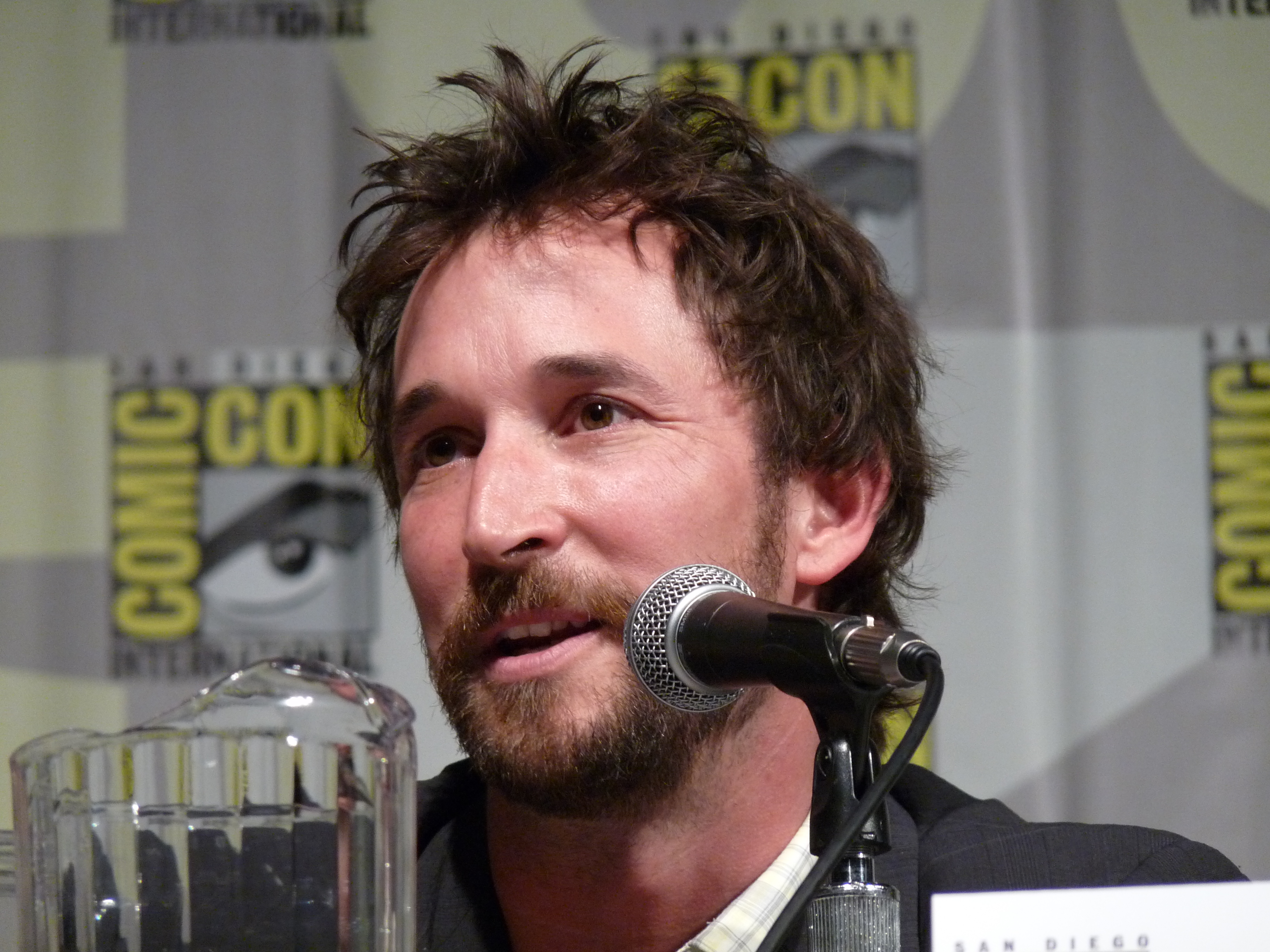
Wyle at the 2010 San Diego Comic-Con promoting the series.

One of the things that was most attractive about it was shooting 10 episodes as opposed to 24, which affords me a bit of quality-of-life and allows me to have a presence in my kids' lives. But in terms of quality of writing, this was great writing. Mark Verheiden's a great writer. I enjoy this kind of storytelling just as much as all of those years on "ER."

— Noah Wyle, on why he chose the role

Casting announcements began in June 2009 when Noah Wyle was announced as the lead. Wyle, who worked with TNT on the Librarian films, was sent scripts for various shows on their network. He said part of the reason he chose the part was to gain credibility from his children. "With the birth of my kids, I started to really look at my career through their eyes more than my own, so that does dictate choice, steering me toward certain things and away from other things," he said. He also decided to do it as he could relate with his character, stating "I identified with Tom's devotion to his sons, and admired his sense of social duty." Spielberg wanted Wyle for the role because he knew him from his previous series ER, which Spielberg's company produced. He had wanted Wyle to appear in his 1998 film Saving Private Ryan but due to scheduling conflicts, he was unable to star. Spielberg stated that he was determined to work with him again. In July 2009, Moon Bloodgood, Jessy Schram, Seychelle Gabriel and Maxim Knight were cast as Anne Glass, Karen Nadler, Lourdes and Matt Mason, respectively. Bloodgood, the female lead, did not have to audition for the role. She received the script and was offered the role. Bloodgood was drawn to the role because of Spielberg and Rodat's involvement. She stated: "Well certainly when you get handed a script and they tell you it's Bob Rodat and Steven Spielberg, you're immediately drawn to it. It's got your attention. I was a little cautious about wanting to do science fiction again. But it was more of a drama story, more of a family story. I liked that and I wanted to work with Spielberg." Bloodgood added that portraying a doctor excited her. "I liked the idea of playing a doctor and deviating from something I had done already," she said. In August 2009, Drew Roy and Peter Shinkoda were cast as Hal Mason and Dai, respectively. Drew Roy's agent received the script and the pair joked that Roy might get the role. "This one came to me through my agent, just like everything else. We even joked about the fact that it was a Steven Spielberg project. We were like, "Oh yeah, I might have a chance." We were just joking." He auditioned four times for the part. "The whole process went on for quite some time, and then towards the end, it was down to me and one other guy, and we were literally waiting for the word from Steven Spielberg ‘cause he had to watch the two audition tapes and give the okay. That, in and of itself, had me like, "Okay, even if I don't get it, that's just cool." Fortunately, it went my way." The pilot was filmed in 2009 in Oshawa, Ontario, and the rest of the season was shot from July to November of the following year in Hamilton and Toronto.

=== Promotion ===
The show's official website offered an online web-comic prior to the show's launch. The comic, released every two weeks, follows the characters of the series just weeks after the alien invasion. It is published by Dark Horse Comics and a 104-page comic was released on Jul 5, 2011. Character videos also became available online. The videos explore the main characters of Falling Skies. As part of the promotional campaign, a vehicle, with the TNT logo and called Falling Skies Technical was released as a free gift in the social networking game Mafia Wars on June 14, 2011.

== Reception ==
The two-hour premiere of Falling Skies was watched by 5.9 million viewers, making it cable television's biggest series launch of the year, with more than 2.6 million adults 18–49 and 3.2 million adults 25–54.

The pilot episode saw a mostly positive reception. Tim Goodman of The Hollywood Reporter wrote "...the entertainment value and suspense of Falling Skies is paced just right. You get the sense that we'll get those answers eventually. And yet, you want to devour the next episode immediately." Thomas Conner of the Chicago Sun-Times called it "...a trustworthy family drama but with aliens." He continued, "It's 'Jericho' meets 'V', with the good from both and the bad discarded. It'll raise the summer-TV bar significantly." Ken Tucker from Entertainment Weekly gave the series a B+ and wrote, "A similar, gradually developed, but decisive conviction makes Falling Skies an engaging, if derivative, chunk of dystopian sci-fi." He continued, "...Falling Skies rises above any one performance; it's the spectacle of humans versus aliens that draws you in." In the Boston Herald, Mark A. Perigard gave the series a B grade, writing "Don't look now, but Falling Skies could be a summer obsession."

However, not all reviews were favorable. Brian Lowry from Variety gave the series a mixed review, stating that he enjoyed the action sequences but that "the soapier elements mostly fall flat", and called the series "painfully old-fashioned". Mike Hale, from The New York Times, called the series "average" and "good on the action, a little muddled on the ideas". He added that "the tone is placid and slightly monotonous, as if we were watching the Walton family at the end of the world". The Washington Post reviewer Hank Steuver criticized the actor portrayals, writing that "the show is slowed by so many wooden performances, Wyle's included". He also states he found himself "root[ing] for the aliens, which cannot have been the writers' intent". In The Miami Herald, Glenn Garvin also criticized the poor acting, stating, "the 'Falling Skies' cast appears unconvinced and unconvincing." Garvin singled out the performance of Sarah Carter as the only exception, and added that Spielberg has "bottomed out" with this family drama series.
