= Sanctuary (Falling Skies) =

- Falling Skies episodes
- The 2nd Mass come under attack by a Skitter and Mech.
- Episode nos.: Season 1 Episodes 6 and 7
- Directed by: Sergio Mimica-Gezzan
- Written by: Joel Anderson Thompson (Part 1); Melinda Hsu Taylor (Part 2)
- Production codes: 106 and 107
- Original air dates: July 17, 2011; July 24, 2011

Guest appearances
- Henry Czerny as Terry Clayton; Martin Roach as Mike

Episode chronology
← Previous "Silent Kill"	Next → "What Hides Beneath"
- Falling Skies season 1

"Sanctuary" is a two-part episode, consisting of the sixth and seventh episodes of the first season of the TNT science fiction drama Falling Skies. The first part aired on July 17, 2011, and the second part aired on July 24, 2011. Part 1 was written by Joel Anderson Thompson and part 2 was written by Melinda Hsu Taylor, both episodes were directed by Sergio Mimica-Gezzan.

== Plot ==
=== Part 1 ===
Anne is robbed at gunpoint by a desperate family for their boy, and flees. Tom, Weaver, and Mike go after the family to convince them to stay. They fire back but are stopped by Terry Clayton, a member of the 7th Mass. The family runs away and gives back the medicine. Clayton meets with Tom, Weaver, and Mike, and tells them that the 7th Mass is destroyed as they were attacked by Skitters. Clayton tells them that he must take the kids of the 2nd Mass because Skitters are on their way and a move from the school is necessary. Tom is very reluctant against this move.

Ben seems to be recovering well, but he has developed superhuman traits due to the needle spikes on his back, and tells Matt that the Skitters cared for the kids and weren’t monsters, but a family. Hal overhears this conversation, seeming concerned.

The school was attacked by a Skitter and Mech, but the 2nd Mass managed to fend off the Mech and kill the Skitter, and Weaver informs Tom that he is taking into consideration to Clayton's suggestion, to which Tom agrees. Tom then goes and speaks to the parents of the 2nd Mass, telling them that he is allowing his kids to go with Clayton and urges everyone else to follow.

The children of the 2nd Mass prepare to leave with Clayton on foot to a ranch. However, the young boy whose father attacked Anne is taken by Clayton to the woods where he is met by a “harnessed” girl, a Skitter, and a Mech. They communicate with Clayton using the girl. Clayton goes back to the Ranch, revealing an imprisoned Pope, whom Clayton beat to interrogate him about the 2nd Mass.

=== Part 2 ===
The children of the 2nd Mass, now at Clayton's "Sanctuary", are enjoying themselves. Terry Clayton and Tessa's father go out to a hidden barn, where their prisoner, John Pope, is being held. Pope was forced to give up information about the 2nd Mass, which allowed Clayton to win their trust. Clayton leaves and Pope, who has already used a piece of broken glass to cut the ropes that were binding him, escapes from the ranch.

Meanwhile, Tom becomes frustrated as the 2nd Mass has received no word from Clayton, and seen no sign of the 3rd Mass nor the escorts. Weaver isn't happy that Tom is leaving to look for the kids, but he orders the pair to return to base camp that night.

Back at the Sanctuary, Lourdes spots a backpack belonging to the boy of the parents who robbed Anne and informs Hal and Mike about the backpack she found. Mike states that he trusts Clayton; however, he later searches the locked barn and finds a pile of children's stuff and backpacks. Clayton finds him and tells Mike the Skitters nearly wiped out the 7th Mass, but offered Clayton an arrangement in which he'd collaborate with them, let the remnant of the 7th Mass. serve as a trap to collect refugee human children, and in return, the Skitters would leave his men and their families alone.

Mike ultimately decides that it's time for the 2nd Mass. children to leave the Sanctuary. Hal realizes that Tessa knew about the plan the entire time, and she alerts her father and the rest of the men that the sacrificial kids are escaping. Mike was killed while he stayed behind to let the children and Hal escape the sanctuary.

The next day, the 2nd Mass children take a break at an abandoned house. Ben believes he should move on ahead of the group since he's not tired and can move faster. Hal agrees with his younger brother and tells him to follow the highway, back to the school base camp. Tom spots Ben, and Ben tells his father about everything.

The men from the Sanctuary have found Hal and children, and demand they give themselves up. Hal opens fire on the soldiers, while Lourdes leads the kids out the back. Pope defends Hal by shooting one of Clayton's men. He gets shot right before he notices Tom hiding among the trees. Tom walks up to the men and offers himself as a hostage to spare the lives of the kids. He tells Hal and the kids to come out, and they all become prisoners of Clayton's. They are escorted back to the Sanctuary but Weaver and other 2nd Mass soldiers have arrived. Clayton and his men give up. Clayton attempts to kill Hal but is shot by Tom.

The 2nd Mass offers a military funeral for Mike, who sacrificed his own life to keep his son and the other children alive. Rick, who feels detached from his father, privately coerces Ben to abandon their humanity for the Skitters.

== Reception ==
=== Ratings ===
In its original American broadcast, "Sanctuary Part 1" was seen by an estimated 4.27 million household viewers, according to Nielsen Media Research. The episode received a 1.4 rating among viewers between ages 18 and 49.

"Sanctuary Part 2" was seen by an estimated 4.07 million viewers. The episode received a 1.4 rating among viewers between ages 18 and 49.

=== Reviews ===
Ryan McGee of The A.V. Club gave the episode an A−, stating, "OK, this? THIS? This is what Falling Skies should be, people. Maybe it’s an anomaly, and we’ll go back to mediocre basics next week. Maybe it’s the show finally learning what works and what doesn’t. Maybe it’s the story finally kicking into gear after weeks of world building. That television shows often come less than fully formed isn’t a revolutionary or unique observation. But when a show takes the leap from “having potential” to “living up to it,” that’s something great to behold. Again: there’s no guarantee that “Sanctuary, Part 1” is the new base standard for Falling Skies. But if it were to be that standard? I’d stand up and declare myself a fan of a show that’s largely disappointed me up until this point."

In his review for Part 2, McGee gave the episode a lower score of C, stating, "Last week, I annoyed more than a few by declaring that Falling Skies had potentially turned a corner with “Sanctuary, Part 1.” I’m not in the habit of defending reviews or getting into the relatively arbitrary nature of grading individual episodes, but for those that have occasionally accused me of being a plant for a show they consider to be terrible, look no further than here to see that can’t possibly be true. Because if “Sanctuary, Part 1” showed the best elements of this show, than “Sanctuary, Part 2” amply demonstrated the show’s weakest aspects. The ideas are still solid, but the execution was put on autopilot for this hour."
