= V (TV series) =

V (TV series) may refer to:

- V (1983 miniseries), a two-part television miniseries
- V: The Final Battle, a 1984 three-part sequel miniseries
- V (1984 TV series), a 1984–1985 TV series
- V (2009 TV series), a reimagining of the 1983 TV miniseries
