= Battlestar Galactica: Blood & Chrome =

- Genre: Military science fiction; Space opera; Drama
- Created by: Michael Taylor; David Eick
- Directed by: Jonas Pate
- Starring: Luke Pasqualino; Ben Cotton; Lili Bordán
- Composer: Bear McCreary
- Country of origin: United States
- Original language: English
- No. of episodes: 10

Production
- Executive producers: David Eick; Jonas Pate; Paul M. Leonard; Michael Taylor
- Production locations: Vancouver, British Columbia, Canada
- Running time: 94 minutes
- Production company: Universal Cable Productions

Original release
- Network: Machinima.com
- Release: November 9 – December 7, 2012

Related
- Battlestar Galactica; Caprica

Battlestar Galactica: Blood & Chrome is a prequel to the reimagined Battlestar Galactica series and is the latest installment in the franchise. It was a web series that became a pilot for a possible series chronicling the early adventures of a young William Adama, but the series was not picked up. It stars Luke Pasqualino, Ben Cotton, and Lili Bordán. Michael Taylor wrote the teleplay from a story by Taylor, David Eick, Bradley Thompson and David Weddle, with Jonas Pate as director. Distribution of Blood & Chrome began as a 10-episode online series in conjunction with Machinima.com on November 9, 2012, and also aired as a television film on February 10, 2013 on Syfy.

== Setting ==
Set in the tenth year of the First Cylon War, the story follows William Adama, a young pilot just graduated from the Academy, assigned to one of the battlestars in the Colonial fleet: the Galactica. The series provides a very basic frame of reference to the events that ensued in the time between the prequel series Caprica, and the basis series Battlestar Galactica.

== Cast ==
- Luke Pasqualino as Ensign/Lieutenant William "Husker" Adama
- Ben Cotton as Lieutenant "Coker" Fasjovik; he previously played a captured Colonial awaiting Cylon experimentation in Battlestar Galactica: Razor.
- Lili Bordán as Dr. Becca Kelly
- John Pyper-Ferguson as Tech Sergeant Xander Toth; he previously played Tomas Vergis on Caprica, and Pegasus CAG Captain Taylor on Battlestar Galactica.
- Zak Santiago as Captain Armin "High Top" Diaz; he previously played Pan on Caprica.
- Leo Li Chiang as Osirus Marine Sergeant
- Mike Dopud as Captain Deke "Minute Man" Tornvald; he previously played Specialist Gage on Battlestar Galactica.
- Brian Markinson as Commander Silas Nash; he also played Jordan Duram on Caprica.
- Adrian Holmes as Lieutenant Decklan Elias
- Karen LeBlanc as Lieutenant Jenna
- Carmen Moore as Senior Lieutenant Nina Leotie; she also played Fidelia Fazekas on Caprica.
- Toby Levins as Pilot "Sandman"
- Jill Teed as Commander Ozar; she also played MSgt. Hadrian on Battlestar Galactica and Col. Sasha Patel on Caprica.
- Sebastian Spence as Lieutenant Jim "Sunshine" Kirby; he also played Capt. Noel "Narcho" Allison on Battlestar Galactica.
- Jordan Weller as Seamus Fahey
- Tom Stevens as Marine Baris
- Tricia Helfer as humanoid Cylon Prototype (voice); she also played the Cylon model Number Six in Battlestar Galactica.
- Ty Olsson as Osiris Crewmember; he also portrayed LSO Captain Aaron Kelly on Battlestar Galactica.

== Development ==
On July 27, 2010, executive producer Michael Taylor shared information about the project, establishing that it would be filmed using digital reconstructions of the Battlestar Galactica sets that were scanned before they were dismantled after the end of the show:

I've seen the virtual 3D version of CIC [Battlestar's Combat Information Center] and it's pretty damn cool. ... And yet the movie isn't confined to Galactica. Far from it. It's a story that will take us to new corners of the 'Battlestar' world (or worlds), and yet it aims to be a very contemporary war movie in a lot of ways. I would say I'm thinking as much of Afghanistan and Iraq—the reality of The Hurt Locker, Sebastian Junger's Restrepo, and similar movies—as I am about the largely implied past of Battlestar.

Syfy made an announcement on October 22, 2010, saying that a two-hour pilot was green-lit for production. On February 10, 2011, Battlestar Galactica: Blood & Chrome began principal photography in Vancouver, British Columbia. During the 2011 San Diego Comic-Con, Syfy's president of original programming, Mark Stern, hinted to an uncertainty regarding which format the project was going to be released in, weighing the possibility of making it into an online series. On February 18, 2012, Battlestar Galactica and Caprica composer Bear McCreary confirmed that he had finished scoring the two-hour pilot.

On March 21, 2012, Deadline Hollywood confirmed that Battlestar Galactica: Blood & Chrome would not move forward in TV format but was still regarded as a candidate for a digital series. On July 12, 2012 however, an article written on the San Diego Comic-Con Battlestar Panel stated that Richard Hatch and Jane Espenson were convinced that "Blood and Chrome was still on the table as a series for SyFy", and that "Bryan Singer's BSG movie is on track". Following the release of an official trailer, Battlestar Galactica: Blood & Chrome was scheduled for release on November 9, 2012, as an online series consisting of ten 12-minute acts.

== Episodes ==
No.	Title	Original release date
1	"Episode 1"	November 9, 2012
Pilot William Adama graduates from the Academy and is posted to join the crew of the Galactica. Much to his disappointment, he is assigned not to a Viper fighter but to a Raptor transport ship named the Wild Weasel. He meets his navigator Coker Fasjovik, who is cynical and interested only in leaving the military, as his tour of duty ends in eight weeks. Coker finds Adama's eagerness irritating and nicknames him "Husker". Galactica's CO, Commander Silas Nash, briefs the two on their first mission together, a routine "milk run" sending cargo to the Scorpia Fleet Shipyards and returning with supplies for the Galactica. It is a four day trip during which they are to avoid enemy contact of any kind.
2	"Episode 2"	November 9, 2012
While preparing the Wild Weasel for the mission, Adama and Coker find out that their cargo isn't supplies but a civilian software engineer, Dr. Becca Kelly. They depart, but upon leaving Galactica's DRADIS range, Dr. Kelly hands them new orders from the Admiralty. They are to rendezvous with the Archeron, a Colonial heavy cruiser, in an area bordering Cylon space. They are put under the authority of Dr. Kelly. As they travel to their destination, Dr. Kelly reveals that she worked for Graystone Industries, designing the upgrade for the Cylons' MCP "brain" chip. When they reach the rendezvous, they discover that the Archeron was ambushed and destroyed. A pair of Cylon raiders appear and attack the Raptor.
3	"Episode 3"	November 16, 2012
Thanks to Adama's risky but excellent piloting, the Wild Weasel narrowly escapes the Cylon raiders. Despite Coker's desire to head home, Dr. Kelly has them break radio silence to send a transmission; they receive an immediate response with yet another set of coordinates. En route Dr. Kelly tells Adama that she was married to famed marine Ezra Barzel (from the Hebrew prophet Ezra and the Hebrew word for "Iron"), who inspired many young people to join the Academy. They arrive at the coordinates to find a fleet of "ghost ships", Colonial vessels assumed to have been destroyed in battle that are hiding in Cylon territory.
4	"Episode 4"	November 16, 2012
The commander of one of the ghost ships, an older Orion-class battlestar called Osiris, assembles a small fleet for a mission. They will bring Dr. Kelly to embedded Colonial operatives on Djerba, a former winter resort planet located in Cylon territory, that holds Dr. Kelly's objective. Dr. Kelly requests that Adama and Coker continue to escort her in the Wild Weasel. Coker overhears the commander say that the mission's personnel must be volunteers (i.e. it is a suicide mission); he is not pleased. On the launch deck, Coker runs into his old friend Lt. Jim Kirby, who was presumed dead after his ship was badly damaged in battle. Kirby asks Coker whether his wife has remarried, and Coker informs him that she has not and is raising their son. Kirby is overjoyed to learn that he has a child. As the mission fleet departs, Commander Ozar of the Osiris tells the crew that the fate of the war depends on Dr. Kelly reaching her objective. Just after the fleet jumps into Djerba's orbit, a Cylon Basestar appears.
5	"Episode 5"	November 23, 2012
The base star and the Osiris exchange fire as the Wild Weasel and its Viper escorts, one of whom is Kirby, fly toward Djerba. They are pursued by three Cylon raiders which the Colonials manage to destroy, though Kirby deserts midway through the battle to go home to see his family. (This desertion did not occur in the televised movie.) Osiris is outnumbered by the Cylon base star and raiders. When its nuclear weapons jam, the commander decides to fly it into the base star and manually detonate the weapons, destroying the Cylon ships and the Osiris. The Wild Weasel crash-lands onto the surface of Djerba.
6	"Episode 6"	November 23, 2012
Adama, Coker and Dr. Kelly abandon the Wild Weasel and trek through Djerba's harsh wind and snow, following a signal with Dr. Kelly's communicator. They track the signal to a huge cave, where they discover their escort unit dead from mysterious non-artillery wounds. Suddenly the cave floor collapses and plunges them into a dark underground chamber. Strange noises surround them and a large snake-like creature lunges out and bites Coker. As Coker struggles to contain the monster, a man abseils into the chamber and kills the snake. He introduces himself as Tech Sgt. Xander Toth, the only surviving escort. He explains that the snakes, which killed his unit, were created by Cylons doing half animal–half machine experiments. Toth has been alone in the cave for some time and is slightly mentally unstable, prone to unpredictable aggressive outbursts. He has scouted a route to Dr. Kelly's objective. They leave the cave and stop at a cliff overlooking a seemingly abandoned resort.
7	"Episode 7"	November 30, 2012
Toth takes Adama, Coker and Dr. Kelly into the abandoned resort, where Toth says the Cylons stored "spare parts". He has rigged the perimeter with mines and set up a generator inside to keep heat running. Dr. Kelly later confides to Adama that her husband's status as a war hero was fabricated by the Colonial army. He did not single handedly defeat a Cylon platoon; rather, his exploratory mission was felled by friendly fire. She emphasizes that the war must end, with which Adama agrees before tenderly touching her. She tells him that "you will regret this", and they sleep together. Shortly after, Adama finds Coker deftly playing a grand piano, and Coker quickly surmises what has happened between Adama and Dr. Kelly. Just as he begins telling Adama that Dr. Kelly's objective is more than it seems, one of Toth's mines explodes and Cylon Centurions approach the compound.
8	"Episode 8"	November 30, 2012
Adama and Coker search the compound for Dr. Kelly, who disappeared when the Cylons arrived. Toth is shot several times by a Centurion; his fate remains unknown. Dr. Kelly stumbles into a cold storage room filled with human remains - likely the "spares" Toth mentioned in the previous episode. She hides inside from a Centurion, who finds her when she exhales loudly. Instead of killing her, the Centurion scans at length a microchip dog tag she wears around her neck. Adama and Coker burst in and Coker shoots the Centurion. The Centurion crashes to the floor and emits a high-frequency wail, which Dr. Kelly explains as screaming - the Cylons can feel pain. Coker puts the Centurion out of its misery and the three set off to look for Toth.
9	"Episode 9"	December 7, 2012
When Coker wants to send a rescue signal for the mortally wounded Toth, Adama and Dr. Kelly instead insist that they press on toward Dr. Kelly's objective. Coker demands to know Dr. Kelly's mission, and she says that she will upload a virus to the Cylons' communications array. Once they find the array, Dr. Kelly begins her upload, but Coker shoots her and disarms Adama when he sees a Battlestar on the communications screen - Dr. Kelly is transmitting information about the ghost fleet to the Cylons. She shoots Coker several times and justifies her betrayal, that the war will only end when humans negotiate with the Cylons, who she thinks value life more than humans do. Accepting that Dr. Kelly is a traitor, Adama destroys the communications unit. He drags a badly wounded Coker out of the array, leaving Dr. Kelly behind.
10	"Episode 10"	December 7, 2012
As Adama and Coker wait for a rescue to take them back to Galactica, Coker shows Adama a picture of his wife before passing out. In the communications array, a quasi-humanoid Cylon (voiced by Tricia Helfer, who also played Number Six) asks Dr. Kelly if she is alive, and if she thinks that her enlightened view of Cylons diminishes their hatred of her, then breaks her neck. Back on Galactica, Commander Nash explains that the seemingly failed mission went as planned. Colonial command had anticipated Dr. Kelly's betrayal, and by the time the Cylons followed the communication, the ghost fleet was long gone and was able to destroy undefended Cylon bases. Nash tells Adama the casualties of the Osiris are worth the victory, and successes like these keep civilians supporting the war effort. Disillusioned, Adama signs off a bland account of the mission. He is then assigned his own Viper. A convalescing Coker surprises Adama before he goes to his ship, which displays his newly chosen call sign: "Husker", an apparent tribute to Coker. Adama joins his fellow pilots, ready to continue the fight.

== Release ==
=== Online ===
On March 20, 2012, a demo reel was leaked online, gathering well over 100,000 views in 24 hours. However, NBCUniversal ordered it to be removed, saying it was not an official trailer. On November 5, 2012, an official trailer was released, pointing to an official release date on November 9, 2012.

On November 9, 2012 the Machinima network released the first two episodes of Blood and Chrome on its YouTube channel. It released two additional episodes each Friday, until the finale on December 7, 2012. They have since been removed with the release on DVD and Blu-ray.

=== Broadcast ===
Universal Cable Productions stated that Blood & Chrome would be broadcast as a movie on SyFy following the online release. It aired February 10, 2013. It garnered 1.145 million viewers with a 0.31 adults 18-49 rating.

In Canada Space (TV channel) later aired the film.

=== Home media ===
Battlestar Galactica: Blood & Chrome was released on Blu-ray, DVD, On Demand and Digital Download on February 19, 2013.
