= Battlestar Galactica: Razor Flashbacks =

- Written by: Michael Taylor
- Directed by: Wayne Rose; Félix Enríquez Alcalá
- Starring: Nico Cortez
- Country of origin: United States
- Original language: English
- No. of episodes: 7 (list of episodes)

Production
- Executive producers: Ronald D. Moore; David Eick
- Running time: 2–5 minutes

Original release
- Network: Sci Fi.com
- Release: October 5 – November 16, 2007

Battlestar Galactica: Razor Flashbacks is a collective title given to a series of seven "webisodes" released in late 2007 in lead up to the television movie Battlestar Galactica: Razor via the World Wide Web and weekly airing. According to Ronald D. Moore, the Razor Flashbacks, in contrast to both The Resistance and The Face of the Enemy webseries, should technically be considered as featurettes. 'The distinction between the two is that webisodes were new material created specifically for the internet, while the featurettes are really little more than deleted scenes from Razor. Despite this, the series is still often referred to as being a series of webisodes due to their separate release.

The final scene, "Escape", featuring Edward James Olmos as the older Adama, is omitted in both the television and extended DVD versions of Razor. Otherwise, the flashbacks from "The Lab" onwards were directly integrated into the TV version, while the DVD edition included all of the remaining episodes except "Day 4,571" and "The Hangar". All webisodes are available for individual viewing on the Region 1, 2 and 4 DVD sets of Razor as a special feature, and are included in "The Complete Series" DVD and Blu-ray box sets. The webisodes are also available as free downloads on the Xbox Live Marketplace, some of which are featured in high-definition 720p resolution.

== Plot ==
The series is set during the final stages of the First Cylon War. It focuses on a younger William "Husker" Adama in his fighter pilot days aboard Galactica while on an important mission to uncover the Cylons' “super weapon” on a mysterious icy planet.

The webisode series starts on the 4,571st day of the war (about 40 years before the destruction of the Twelve Colonies of Kobol). While Galactica is fighting Cylon threats, Adama faces his own problems when he discovers his lover has been gravely injured after her raptor is attacked by the Cylons. Adama soon finds himself swung into action shooting down Cylon raiders, but after a head-on collision with a raider, ejects and lands on the nearby planet, only to be confronted by the unexpected reality of what the Cylons have been working on.

== Webisodes ==
| Title | Directed by | Written by | Release date |
|---|---|---|---|
| Day 4,571 | Wayne Rose | Michael Taylor | October 5, 2007 |
A young William Adama, on Galactica, speculates with a close fellow fighter pilot about the ship’s current mission.
| The Hangar | Wayne Rose | Michael Taylor | October 12, 2007 |
Adama recognises a familiar face amongst some wounded in the midst of “Operation Raptor Talon”.
| Operation Raptor Talon | Félix Enríquez Alcalá | Michael Taylor | October 19, 2007 |
While Columbia and a Cylon Basestar battle above an icy planet, Adama’s squadron battle the Cylon Raiders. As the fight draws to a close with Columbia's destruction, Adama, as an impulsive response for revenge, blindly follows two of the Raiders into the planet’s atmosphere.
| Free Fall | Félix Enríquez Alcalá | Michael Taylor | October 26, 2007 |
As Adama freefalls through the planet’s atmosphere, he finds himself in an awkward position as he encounters a Cylon Centurion.
| The Lab | Félix Enríquez Alcalá | Michael Taylor | November 2, 2007 |
Adama begins to investigate the mysterious building on the planet’s surface only to inadvertently discover the remnants of Cylon’s violent experiments with humans.
| Survivors | Félix Enríquez Alcalá | Michael Taylor | November 9, 2007 |
Several live humans are discovered in a vault-like room while the sudden vibrations of a Cylon ship can be heard. Adama is faced with a difficult decision of saving himself or rescuing the trapped captives.
| Escape | Félix Enríquez Alcalá | Michael Taylor | November 16, 2007 |
The Cylon ship on the planet takes off with haste as Adama makes contact with Galactica only to find out an armistice had been signed between the Humans and Cylons.

== Cast ==
- Young Lt. William "Husker" Adama, played by Nico Cortez
- Aaron Doral, played by Matthew Bennett
- Ops Officer, played by Chris Bradford
- Hybrid, played by Campbell Lane
- Banzai (squad leader), played by Jacob Blair
- Lt. Jaycie McGavin, played by Allison Warnyca
- Frightened man, played by Ben Cotton
- Commander William Adama, 40 years after the war and just prior to the destruction of the colonies, played by Edward James Olmos ("Escape" only)
