= Reign of Fire =

Reign of Fire may refer to:

- Reign of Fire (album), an album by reggae artist Capleton
- Reign of Fire (film), 2002 action/science-fiction film directed by Rob Bowman
- Reign of Fire (video game), a video game based on the movie
- "Reign of Fire", a song by Armored Saint from their 1991 album Symbol of Salvation

== See also ==
- Ring of Fire (disambiguation)
