= Ring of Fire (disambiguation) =

The Ring of Fire is a series of oceanic trenches and volcanoes around the Pacific Ocean.

Ring of Fire may also refer to:

== Films, radio, and TV ==
- Ring of Fire (1961 film), a crime drama starring David Janssen directed by Andrew L. Stone
- Ring of Fire, a 2000 animated short film by Andreas Hykade
- Ring of Fire (2013 film), a biographical television film about June Carter Cash and Johnny Cash
- Ring of Fire: An Indonesian Odyssey, a 1988 documentary series
- Ring of Fire (1991 documentary film), an IMAX documentary about the Pacific Ring of Fire
- Ring of Fire (1991 martial arts film), starring Don "The Dragon" Wilson
- "Ring of Fire" (Adventure Time episode), 2017
- "Ring of Fire" (Knight Rider episode), 1983
- "Ring of Fire" (Teenage Mutant Ninja Turtles episode), 1993
- Ring of Fire, a two-part 2012 disaster miniseries featuring Michael Vartan, Terry O'Quinn and Brian Markinson
- "Ring of Fire", first episode of the 2015 series Thunderbirds Are Go
- Ring of Fire (radio program), a syndicated American talk radio started in 2004

== Literature ==
- Ring of Fire (series), a series of alternate history books by Eric Flint and other authors
- Ring of Fire (anthology), a series of short story collections as a part of the above series. (Ring of Fire II, Ring of Fire III)
- Ring of Fire (Buffy comic), a paperback collection of Buffy the Vampire Slayer comics
- Ring of Fire, one of the Three Rings of Elvenkind in J. R. R. Tolkien's Middle-earth
- Ring of Fire (novel), an Italian young adult fantasy by Pierdomenico Baccalario
- Thunderbirds: Ring of Fire, 1966 tie-in novel for the television series Thunderbirds.

== Music ==
- Ring of Fire (band), an American heavy metal group
- Ring of Fire (musical), a theater musical on the life of Johnny Cash
- Ring of Fire: The Best of Johnny Cash, an album by Johnny Cash
- Ring of Fire (Mark Boals album)
- "Ring of Fire" (Duane Eddy song), a 1961 song by Duane Eddy from the movie Ring of Fire
- "Ring of Fire" (song), by June Carter Cash, first performed by her sister, Anita Carter, and later covered by Johnny Cash
- "Ring of Fire", a song by Def Leppard on their 1993 album Retro Active

== Natural science ==
- Ring of fire, a term for crowning during the second stage of childbirth
- Ring of Fire, a sunflower variety
- Ring of Fire (Northern Ontario), a geographic formation and mining exploration area in Canada
- Ring of fire (meteorology), a weather pattern associated with high-pressure ridges and heat domes
- Appearance of the sun as a bright ring during an annular solar eclipse is called Ring of Fire.

== Other uses ==
- Ring of Fire (wargame), 1994 wargame simulating the Belgorod–Kharkov offensive operation during World War II
- Ring of Fire (game), a drinking game
- Ring of Fire (ride), an amusement ride
- Ring of Fire Studios, a visual effects, animation, and digital post production studio
- "Ring of Fire", the Tyson Fury vs. Oleksandr Usyk heavyweight boxing match
- "The Ring of Fire", a nickname of Westpac Stadium, a sports arena in New Zealand
- "Ring of Fire", a nickname of the lighting system of the Dubai International Cricket Stadium, a sports arena in the United Arab Emirates
- "The Ring of Fire companies", a name given to several American companies, especially those based near Los Angeles, that produced cheap handguns known as a Saturday night special

== See also ==
- Wall of Fire (disambiguation)
