= Wall of Fire =

Wall of Fire may refer to:

- Wall of Fire (album), the second solo album by Peter Elkas
- "Wall of Fire" (song), a song by The Kinks
- Wall of Fire (mountain), a 700 m cliff face of vertically displaced quartzite in the Swartberg mountain range in South Africa
- Romance of the Three Kingdoms IV: Wall of Fire, the fourth game in Koei's Romance of the Three Kingdoms series
- The Wall of Fire, also known as Incident II, the traumatic memories associated with the ruler Xenu in Scientology

== See also ==
- Firewall (disambiguation)
- Wall Fire, a 2017 wildfire near Bangor, Eastern Butte County, California
- Ring of Fire (disambiguation)
