= Firewall =

Firewall may refer to:

- Firewall (computing), a technological barrier designed to prevent unauthorized or unwanted communications between computer networks or hosts
- Firewall (construction), a barrier inside a building, designed to limit the spread of fire, heat and structural collapse
- Firewall (engine), the part of a vehicle that separates the engine compartment from the rest of the vehicle
- Firewall (physics), a hypothetical phenomenon where a freely falling observer spontaneously burns up at the horizon of a black hole
- Firewall (politics), also known as cordon sanitaire: the refusal of one or more political parties to cooperate with certain other political parties.
  - For example, see Firewall against the far-right in Germany

== Arts, entertainment, and media ==
=== Music ===
- Firewall, an alias of British musician Lange (born 1974)
- "Firewall", a song by Steve Vai from the 2005 album Real Illusions: Reflections
- "Firewall", a song by Kompany from the 2019 extended play Metropolis

=== Literature ===
- Firewall (Andy McNab novel), a Nick Stone adventure
- Firewall (Mankell novel), a 1998 novel by Henning Mankell, featuring Kurt Walland

=== Film and television ===
- Firewall (film), a 2006 thriller film written by Joe Forte, starring Harrison Ford
- "Firewall" (Person of Interest), an episode of the American television drama series Person of Interest
- "Firewall", an episode from the Canadian animated series ReBoot
- "Firewall" (VisionQuest), an episode of the television miniseries VisionQuest

=== Characters ===
- Firewall, a fictional character in the G.I. Joe universe

== See also ==
- Alberta Agenda, also known as the Alberta Firewall, a political proposal for the Canadian province
- firewalld, a firewall management tool for Linux operating systems
- Great Firewall, China's internet censorship firewall
- Chinese wall, a zone of non-communication between distinct sections of a business, in order to prevent conflicts of interest
- Personal firewall, a very popular form of firewall designed to protect personal computers
- Reredos, a short wall behind a fire in a traditional hearth
- Wall of Fire (disambiguation)
