= Caprica =

2010 science fiction TV-series

- Genre: Science fiction; Drama; Family saga; Philosophical fiction; Cyberpunk
- Created by: Remi Aubuchon; Ronald D. Moore
- Starring: Eric Stoltz; Esai Morales; Paula Malcomson; Alessandra Torresani; Magda Apanowicz; Sasha Roiz; Brian Markinson; Polly Walker
- Music by: Bear McCreary
- Country of origin: United States
- Original language: English
- No. of seasons: 1
- No. of episodes: 19

Production
- Executive producers: Ronald D. Moore; David Eick; Jane Espenson; Kevin Murphy
- Producer: Clara George
- Production locations: Vancouver, British Columbia, Canada
- Running time: 42 minutes
- Production company: Universal Cable Productions

Original release
- Network: Syfy
- Release: January 22 – November 30, 2010

Related
- Battlestar Galactica (2003–09); Battlestar Galactica: Blood & Chrome (2012)

Caprica is a 2010 American science fiction drama television series, a prequel spin-off of the 2003–2009 series Battlestar Galactica. Caprica is set 58 years before the main series, and shows how humanity first created the Cylon robots which would later turn against their human masters. Among Caprica's main characters are the father and uncle of William Adama, the man who becomes the senior surviving military leader of the fleet which represents the remnants of the Twelve Colonies in Battlestar Galactica.

An extended version of the pilot premiered exclusively on DVD and digital download on April 21, 2009. The first season debuted on television on January 22, 2010, on Syfy in the U.S., Space in Canada, and Sky1 in the UK. It ran for nine episodes, including the two-hour pilot, before going on a mid-season hiatus. The second half of the first season (Season 1.5) began airing on October 5, 2010, on Syfy and Space.

On October 27, 2010, Syfy canceled the show, citing low ratings, and pulled the remaining five episodes of the series from its broadcast schedule. The series continued to air as scheduled on Space, finishing with the series finale on November 30, 2010. The remaining episodes were released on DVD in the U.S. on December 21, 2010 and aired on Syfy in a burn-off marathon on January 4, 2011.

== Plot ==
Caprica is set before the cataclysmic destruction of the Twelve Colonies of Kobol, focusing on the planet Caprica, the main planet of the Twelve Colonies. Caprica is the governmental seat of the Twelve Colonies, having also become the de facto seat of culture, art, science, and learning; the language of Caprica has become the standard language of the Twelve Colonies.

The Twelve Colonies are at peace, 58 years before the events of Battlestar Galactica, when an act of religious fanaticism brings together Joseph Adama, a lawyer with ties to the criminal underworld, and wealthy technologist Daniel Graystone, both of whom lost family members. Grief-stricken by the loss of his daughter and fueled by obsession, Daniel sets out to bring her back, using his considerable wealth and sprawling technology corporation, Greystone Industries. Offered the chance of his own daughter being restored, Joseph wrestles with the notion until he comes face to face with its reality. Simultaneously, Greystone Industries has developed a new generation of robot, named a Cylon, which eventually becomes part of Colonial society and becomes increasingly sentient.

== Cast and characters ==
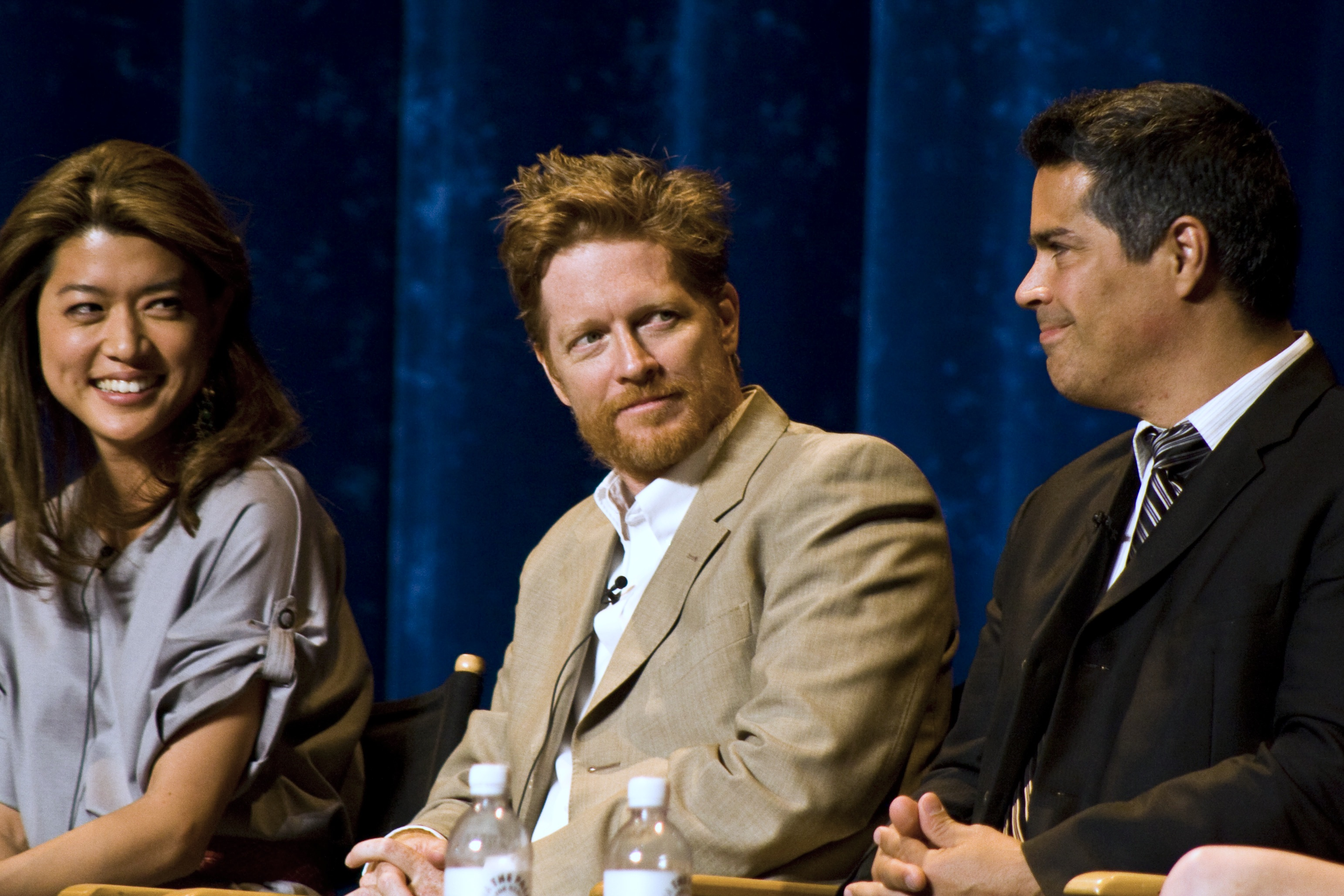
Grace Park, Eric Stoltz and Esai Morales (April 2009)

Eric Stoltz received the script while filming a movie, and he left it in his hotel room for several days without reading it. When it was stolen by a maid who had been paid off by a Battlestar fan, he realized how passionate the fandom was, and knew he had to read it. Paula Malcomson originally tested for the role of Sister Clarice Willow; however, Jeffrey Reiner felt she would make a great Amanda Graystone. On April 28, 2009, Sasha Roiz's role was expanded to full series regular.

- Eric Stoltz as Daniel Graystone – Husband of Amanda and father of Zoe
- Esai Morales as Joseph Adama – Father of William and Tamara
- Paula Malcomson as Amanda Graystone – Wife of Daniel and mother of Zoe
- Alessandra Torresani as Zoe Graystone – Daughter of Daniel and Amanda
- Magda Apanowicz as Lacy Rand – Zoe's best friend
- Sasha Roiz as Sam Adama – Brother of Joseph
- Brian Markinson as Jordan Duram – An agent for the Global Defense Department
- Polly Walker as Sister Clarice Willow – Headmistress at Athena Academy

== Episodes ==
No.	Title	Directed by	Written by	Original release date	US viewers (millions)
1	"Pilot"	Jeffrey Reiner	Remi Aubuchon & Ronald D. Moore	January 22, 2010	1.60
2	"Pilot"	Jeffrey Reiner	Remi Aubuchon & Ronald D. Moore	January 22, 2010	1.60
It is 58 years before the Fall, and the planet Caprica is one of the Twelve Colonies of Humanity. Zoe Graystone, rebellious teenage daughter of wealthy Caprican computer engineer Daniel Graystone and Doctor Amanda Graystone, plans to leave her home world to go to the neighboring planet of Gemenon. She is accompanied by her boyfriend, Ben Stark, and her best friend, Lacy Rand, and (unbeknownst to Zoe's parents) all three are connected to the cult "Soldiers of the One" (STO), a radical religious organization that dismisses the Colonies' polytheism (namely the Lords of Kobol) in favor of monotheism. However, Lacy has second thoughts just as Zoe and Ben board an elevated mag-lev train. On board, Ben reveals a suicide-bomber jacket, which he detonates in the name of the one true god, killing himself, Zoe, and many other passengers. Struggling to come to terms with the loss of their child, Daniel discovers that Zoe had created a sentient digital avatar of herself that exists in a teenage virtual reality nightclub, accessed via a Holoband. Meanwhile, Amanda is approached by Agent Jordan Duram, a Global Defense Department officer investigating the case, but she initially rejects his assertion that Zoe was involved with the terrorists. Daniel also reaches out to another bereaved parent, Joseph Adama, an influential lawyer with family ties to the Tauron Ha'la'tha crime syndicate. Daniel offers to create a clone of Joseph's daughter Tamara, and wife too, in exchange for the theft of a processor from one of Graystone's competitors, Tomas Vergis. Joseph agrees and the stolen MCP chip allows Daniel to complete a robot prototype called a Cylon, a machine of considerable strength and agility. Daniel then attempts to resurrect his daughter Zoe by downloading her digital avatar's consciousness into the Cylon's artificial body, but the experiment seems to result in the loss of the avatar data. Later, after a demonstration of the modified Zoe-Cylon's combat skills, Daniel's company is given a major contract by the Caprican government to mass-produce Cylons for military use. Although the prototype Cylon is not designed to be sentient, it now possesses a unique AI, and no-one is aware that Zoe's avatar survives, except for Lacy, who Zoe calls from the lab.
3	"Rebirth"	Jonas Pate	Mark Verheiden	January 29, 2010	1.41
It is now one month since the bombing, and Zoe is having problems distinguishing her real self from her virtual self. Lacy is approached by Sister Clarice Willow, the head of Zoe and Lacy's school, the Athena Academy, and also a member of the STO cult, who takes a special interest in her. Joseph struggles to connect to his son William, who begins spending time more with his uncle Samuel, an enforcer with the Tauron crime syndicate. Still haunted by Tamara's avatar, he attempts to contact Daniel again. Resigning himself to the loss of Zoe, Daniel turns his attention back to the mass-production order, and has the prototype moved to his home lab. While it is clear to him that the original Zoe-Cylon prototype exceeds the intelligence specs needed, it also exhibits erratic behavior. Meanwhile, Amanda finally discovers from Agent Duram that her daughter had a secret boyfriend. At the terror memorial service, she learns more of the secret one-year relationship, and is given some of her daughter's effects (by Ben's mother) and finds an infinity symbol, which links Zoe to the STO. She finally concedes that Zoe must have been involved with the STO, and makes an emotional public statement to that effect.
4	"Reins of a Waterfall"	Ronald D. Moore	Michael Angeli	February 5, 2010	1.13
After Amanda's revelation, the Graystones face the wrath of angered Capricans, culminating in Amanda's resignation from the hospital, and a violent altercation between Daniel and Samuel. Lacy begins to be pressured by other students at school re. STO, and the Academy director, Clarice Willow, tries to learn more of the virtual Zoe as well. Daniel's assistant, Cyrus Xander, suggests hiring a well-known PR agent, to counteract the bad press effect on company share prices. Joseph's surviving son William wags school and as he feels more and more abandoned by his father. He drifts further into the Ha'la'tha mafia milieu, encouraged by his uncle Sam. Meanwhile, Agent Duram destroys a year-old video of a police interview with Ben, who was caught after curfew with bomb components in his schoolbag. He also leaks to the media how the Graystone residence is yet to be searched. Later, Zoe discovers Tamara's avatar in a virtual holding area and releases her into the wider "V-world", which consists of both licensed and hacked sites. Joseph again attempts to contact Tamara's avatar, but Daniel insists she is 'gone'. Frustrated, Joseph tells his brother to 'even the score' with the Graystones – with the death of both daughters and both wives.
5	"Gravedancing"	Michael Watkins	Story by : Jane Espenson & Michael Angeli; Teleplay by : Jane Espenson	February 19, 2010	0.98
As public outrage keeps mounting, Daniel is finally persuaded to appear on the late-night television show Backtalk with Baxter Sarno and tell his side of the story. Agent Duram finally obtains permission to search both Zoe's former school and the Graystone residence, hoping to uncover evidence regarding the recent and possible future STO motivated attacks. Clarice passes an e-sheet warning to STO members just in time for student Keon Gatwick to remove bomb materials from his locker. Frustrated by their lack of success, the detectives then turn their attention to examining electronic messages. Meanwhile, Daniel succeeds in reclaiming a measure of sympathy on TV, particularly when Amanda suddenly appears onstage, and they agree that the 'moral vacuum' of holotechnology probably allowed STO to recruit vulnerable people like Zoe. Daniel then promises his company will not profit from the lucrative but much maligned Holoband licensing anymore, and that they will also set up a charitable fund. Joseph, in spite of his mother-in-law Ruth's wishes, relents and manages to call off the blood-feud hit on Amanda. Later, Lacy Rand tries to get help from Keon's STO cell to smuggle Zoe in her Cylon form to Gemenon.
6	"There Is Another Sky"	Michael Nankin	Kath Lingenfelter	February 26, 2010	1.13
Joseph is having ongoing troubles with Willie, who continues to be absent from school, and is angry to find him working at the Tauron club with Sam. Tamara now wanders around the V-world nightclub and discovers, after being shot by Vesta, that she cannot be killed. Compelled to work in return for her 'freedom', Tamara is led by Heracles, a young gamer, to New Cap City, a virtual version of Caprica City, where violence and crime abound. Meanwhile, on a fishing trip, a clearly bored Willie loses control and throws a rock at a boy who taunted him. Daniel Graystone is faced with the realization that the very steps he took to salvage his public image may in turn cost him control of Graystone Industries. He declares Holoband technology no longer relevant and uses the Zoe-Cylon prototype, codenamed U-87, to convince the board that artificial sentience is the way of the future – in creating a servile, tireless, and unquestioning race of workers. After infiltrating a bank vault, and learning from Vesta that she is dead in real life, Tamara persuades Heracles to log out and alert her father that she is still alive. He arrives at the Adama residence just as the surviving family and friends gather for a Tauron memorial service, and is chased down the street by a confused Joseph.
7	"Know Thy Enemy"	Michael Nankin	Story by : Patrick Massett & John Zinman & Matthew B. Roberts; Teleplay by : Patrick Massett & John Zinman	March 5, 2010	1.16
After the revelation that the avatar of his daughter Tamara is still lost in the holoband world, Joseph starts a quest to find her by tracking down the whereabouts and identity of Heracles. Tomas Vergis, haunted by the death of his employees during the MCP chip heist, arrives on Caprica wanting to meet with Daniel. He then accuses Daniel of stealing the MCP chip that is now the key to the U-87 Cylon and Graystone's military contract. Daniel confronts Joseph concerning the threat and demands to know how Tomas knew of his role in the theft, but Joseph worries mainly about retribution from the Guatrau towards his family. Concerned that the off-world STO leadership has been backing a rogue named Barnabas Greeley, a man involved in the targeted bombings of holoband cafes, Clarice steps up her plans to acquire Zoe's avatar program. She befriends Amanda and successfully accesses the Graystone house and Daniel's PC. Meanwhile, wanting to fulfill her own promise to Zoe, Lacy goes with Keon to meet the elusive Barnabas, but is abruptly rebuffed. Tomas makes an offer for Graystone's sports team, the C-Bucs, 300 million cubits that could help Graystone Industries. His motive is not financial profit, but for his desire, as a Tauron, for blood revenge.
8	"The Imperfections of Memory"	Wayne Rose	Matthew B. Roberts	March 12, 2010	1.07
Still seeking Zoe's Avatar program, Clarice redoubles her efforts to gain Amanda's confidence. Lacy's attempts to enlist the help of Barnabas have fallen short, producing tension between her and Zoe. Zoe continues her 'romance' with Philomon, a young scientist in her father's employ, in hopes that he can assist her in getting her out of the lab. Tomas meets with Daniel and informs him of the rumor that Daniel's company only has one working MCP chip. At a C-Bucs game, he further attempts to pressure Daniel by telling him that he knows the MCP never worked for him. Behind a restaurant, Joseph corners Tad Thorean, a.k.a. Heracles, and compels him to help find his daughter. They both enter the game, but Heracles is soon "killed" helping Joseph, meaning he can never return to New Cap City and that Joseph is now on his own. Meanwhile, Amanda has been haunted by visions of her brother Darius, who died in a car crash several years ago, and reveals to Clarice (at the Dive Bar) that she "totally lost it" when he died. Now totally lost and clueless, Joseph is confronted by and hires the mysterious Emmanuelle as a guide. Daniel, based on Zoe's generative-analog theory (passed on via Philomon), finally suspects that Zoe's avatar is inhabiting the Cylon's MCP.
9	"Ghosts in the Machine"	Wayne Rose	Michael Taylor	March 19, 2010	1.23
Joseph and Emmanuelle seek Tamara at the New Cap equivalent of the Adama home, but the apartment is inhabited by a drug addict – an "amphead". As the druggie yields the information that Joseph's daughter is at a club called "Mysteries", a gang of drug dealers burst in on the scene and threaten to end his New Cap gamelife. Emmanuelle then takes out the whole team with her pistol, and berates him for freezing up. Daniel tries to communicate with Zoe but without success, and later constructs a pyre around her. Although Zoe is agonized by memories of being trapped in a burning house when she was 5, she does not reveal herself. Still troubled by visions of her long-dead brother, Amanda returns to the scene of the fatal crash in an unsuccessful attempt to learn more. Joseph, now a regular Amp user himself, goes to the Mysteries club and finds evidence of Tamara - a stylized "T" signature of hers. Tomas visits the Graystone house and tells Amanda about the theft and his two dead employees, but Amanda refuses to doubt her husband (who tests U-87 again by ordering her to shoot their pet dog). Later in V-world, Zoe pleads with Lacy to find a way to get her off of Caprica before she harms Daniel due to the nature of his 'tests'.
10	"End of Line"	Roxann Dawson	Michael Taylor	March 26, 2010	1.10
In a 20-hour flash forward, U-87 is driving a stolen van with police choppers in pursuit. Earlier, it is revealed that Daniel's financial troubles are worsening, and he must sell the Buccaneers. Worse still, the army also knows the chip was stolen, and have given him only a week to finish the project. The powerplay between Clarice and Barnabas also heats up, as both jostle for local STO dominance. Daniel orders the chip irradiated and Philo reluctantly undertakes his orders, but just as he does Zoe reveals herself to him and when he panics is forced to kill him, she then steals a van and speeds away. On V-world, a fixated Joseph finally finds his daughter's avatar with the help of Emmanuelle (revealed as his assistant Evelyn). But Tamara shoots herself, and then her father, so that he can't come back to New Cap City, and is finally forced to come to terms with her death. Lacy tries to push the shipment forward, and discovers that Barnabas is about to detonate a bomb (that she helped plant) in Clarice's car. On her way to the terminal, Clarice is caught in traffic at the Pantheon Bridge. She then spots Amanda, clearly shocked by Daniel's complicity in the murders, preparing to jump. She leaves the car, just as the bomb detonates, and Amanda steps off. U-87 approaches a heavily armed roadblock, and Zoe slams through it, destroying the Cylon.
11	"Unvanquished"	Eric Stoltz	Ryan Mottesheard	October 5, 2010	0.89
Three weeks have passed and followers of the "One True God" place detonators under their seats at a Pyramid match. Clarice observes the stadium explode, revealing it to be a simulation illustrating her proposal to the leaders of the monotheist church on Gemenon for "Apotheosis". Daniel seeks a business partnership with the Ha'la'tha crime syndicate in order to regain control of Graystone Industries, now run by Tomas, and now mass-producing Cylons. Using Zoe's avatar program, Clarice wants to create a virtual heaven which allows believers to sacrifice themselves in the real world to live forever in a virtual one. However, one of the leaders, Obal Ferras convinces the Blessed Mother to kill Clarice, but the monotheist leaders kill Obal instead. A rattled Blessed Mother then gives Clarice total authority over all STO cells on Caprica. Still "alive", Zoe now exists solely in the V-World where both she and Tamara are known as unkillable "deathwalkers". On Caprica, Daniel finalizes a deal with the Ha'la'tha while Cyrus ignores an order from Tomas to destroy the prototype. Daniel leaves video messages for his wife - still alive in a cabin in the woods, and recuperating from her fall from the bridge.
12	"Retribution"	Jonas Pate	Patrick Massett & John Zinman	October 12, 2010	0.84
Daniel prepares to reclaim his company, and does so by having Sam and Joseph ready evidence to blackmail the board members into voting for him back. Amanda remembers how she survived her suicide attempt and, while in the hospital, her ongoing trust issues with her husband. Lacy and two other STO agents botch an attack on a spaceport after Lacy is confronted by security, and they flee the scene in a car driven by Keon. Clarice then kills the two agents who betrayed her by joining Barnabas' side. Daniel is shown the U-87 prototype remains by Cyrus. After Duram questions her about Clarice's links to Gemenon, the STO, and radicalized students at her school (including Zoe), Amanda begins to doubt her 'friend' and goes home to retrieve a loaded gun. Barnabas soon suspects Lacy's loyalty too, and when Keon attempts to leave, he is shot. At that moment, Clarice and one of her husbands arrive at Barnabas' hideout - they disarm and handcuff him to a table and rig a bomb to explode- then take Lacy and leave. Once outside, Clarice detonates the bomb remotely, killing Barnabas. Amanda comes close to using the gun, but hesitates when Clarice claims that Amanda is the only one she can talk to.
13	"Things We Lock Away"	Tim Hunter	Drew Z. Greenberg	October 19, 2010	0.72
Daniel is reinstated as CEO but is advised by Joseph that Tomas should be killed. Daniel refuses and proposes negotiating with him. Meanwhile, Lacy is now being held captive and drugged in the Willow family's attic. In flashback, Daniel's Cylon design is influenced by Zoe's childhood drawings, and Zoe creates the virtual avatar for the first time. In New Cap City, Zoe demands to see the other Death Walker. Tamara then appears, seeking revenge, and watches as family members of the STO victims beat Zoe mercilessly. In the cabin, Amanda has been unable to find any evidence against Clarice, and Duram instructs her to search the Willow home. Amanda finally returns home which Clarice also visits (still seeking the backup of the avatar program). At the urging of the "Messenger" of herself, Zoe convinces Tamara that New Cap City is beneath them. Clarice visits Lacy seeking information on Zoe's avatar (the 'resurrection' program) and learns a backup may be hidden in Zoe's infinity-symbol. She then informs Lacy that she will be sent to Gemenon. Amanda then arrives for her stay at the Willow household. At the Graystone house, Tomas tells Daniel to kill him, but Daniel refuses and again tries to negotiate. Tomas then kills himself and Joseph organizes a "clean up".
14	"False Labor"	John Dahl	Michael Taylor	October 26, 2010	0.84
Sam, disturbed by the ongoing civil war on Tauron in which his parents died, wants to do more to help than just send money, but is having ongoing troubles with his husband Larry over the issue. Daniel continues working on the resurrection avatar holoband program, and 'guinea-pigs' it on an avatar recreation of Amanda. Meanwhile, Amanda continues to befriend Clarice's family so she can spy on her, including lying about her history with Zoe, and reporting activity to Duram. Daniel is pressured to release an ad promoting the new resurrection program, called Grace, by the Gautrau, but also learns of several disturbing irregularities at the company. Sam and one of his Ha'la'tha colleagues take a risk by smuggling guns, but a rival Tauron gang intervenes creating problems for Sam. Evelyn, with the help of Ruth, is finally able to make herself be noticed by Joseph, which leads to a romantic evening alone. Daniel's attempts to make the Amanda avatar more human-like however seem to fail as the avatar primarily focuses on pleasing Daniel first. Later, Sam uses a Cylon to wipe out the rival gang, but has mixed feelings when the Guatrau warns him to forget the Tauron rebellion and politics of the "old world", since they and their families are now settled and living on Caprica.
15	"Blowback"	Omar Madha	Kevin Murphy	November 2, 2010 (on Space)	0.53
The STO jumpship transporting Lacy to Gemenon is hijacked by polytheists who begin executing the young recruits. Zoe's gold infinity-symbol pin, stored in a GDD evidence room, is delivered to Clarice by an STO mole - the pin is actually a digital storage device and contains a backup copy of the avatar program. Daniel explains the company's irregularities to Joseph and Sam, detailing how Cylon units are being sold to the STO on Gemenon. Lacy and some acolytes finally resist their captivity and violently assault the hijackers, only to learn that it was actually an STO initiation test. Daniel is given two weeks to complete his resurrection program by the Guatrau, who secretly orders Sam to kill Daniel after the time elapses. Duram becomes suspicious of his superior, Gara Singh, after noticing the missing evidence, and falsely identifies Mar-Beth as a GDD informant in the Willow home. Via holoband, Singh relays the information to Clarice who then knifes Mar-Beth in the park and takes her baby. When the headless body is later found, it is a clear confirmation to Duram that Singh is a STO mole. On Gemenon at the STO training camp, Lacy watches as a Cylon executes, for failing to defend their faith during the staged hijacking, five of the new recruits.
16	"The Dirteaters"	John Dahl	Matthew B. Roberts	November 9, 2010 (on Space)	0.67
Joseph and Sam are both promoted by the Gautrau. In a flashback to the first Uprising thirty years ago, the Adama parents are both devoted to the Tauron cause. Zoe and Tamara, now called "The Avenging Angels", have teamed up to rid New Cap City of corruption. Daniel discovers that the CEO of every Ha'la'tha corporation later ends up dead, and makes a deal: in exchange for providing Cylons for Tauron, Sam will work out how to spare Daniel's life. Amanda plants a recording device in Clarice's room. One night, young Sam takes money and a gun off a dead "Herac" soldier and hides them under his bed. Later troops enter the Adama home and discover the gun - William Sr. is tied and brutally beaten while his wife is shot. Young Joseph and Sam watch silently from a hidden wall compartment until Joseph finally uses the gun. At the GDD, Singh manages to get Duram suspended pending an internal affairs investigation. Meanwhile, William asks Joseph to shoot him, in keeping with the Tauron way. In the present, the older Adama brothers resolve to stop the Guatrau together. In V-world, Daniel finally meets Zoe and Tamara, but the two flee and begin to reconfigure it to avoid meeting their parents again. Amanda and Daniel resolve to find Zoe together.
17	"The Heavens Will Rise"	Michael Nankin	Patrick Massett & John Zinman	November 16, 2010 (on Space)	0.70
Tamara mysteriously "derezes" and is taken to a virtual room by Daniel. Zoe then appears in the room and stabs Daniel's virtual self, thus derezing him too. Daniel then asks Sam to help him - at first Sam refuses, but after seeing a T-shirt of the Avenging Angels, he decides to go in to save his brother any more grief. Amanda finally tells Daniel that she is a mole in Clarice's house and later meets Duram – who wants Amanda to switch Clarice's holoband. On Gemenon, Lacy watches in horror as an STO soldier orders a Cylon to shoot a young recruit who failed to salute. She tells the robot to stop and surprisingly it obeys. Fidelia Fazekas, the Gautrau's daughter and Joseph's former lover, becomes increasingly suspicious of the missing Cylon units. After the handover, Duram is shot by an unseen sniper - Amanda runs to save his life, but cannot find Clarice's holoband. Later, Lacy goes to the storage area where a squad of Cylons are kept in standby mode, and asks for Zoe. Meanwhile, the Blessed Mother becomes aware of Lacy's power and suggests that she be killed. Clarice, Olaf, and Nestor find that her holoband was switched, and realize that Amanda was the true spy in their house. Sam, Amanda and Daniel, out to locate the girls, travel through Zoe and Tamara's newly created forest.
18	"Here Be Dragons"	Michael Nankin	Michael Taylor	November 23, 2010 (on Space)	0.62
As the three search for Zoe and Tamara in V-World, Amanda distrusts Sam and 'removes' him from the game. Based on his daughter's feedback, the Guatrau also decides to remove the Adama brothers. Joseph survives a hit at home with the intervention of Ruth, and the family prepare to flee Caprica. Meanwhile, Clarice, Olaf, and Nestor break into the Graystone residence, planning to kill them and retrieve the holoband. At the STO camp, the death of Lacy is also planned, however the trainees revolt and kill their STO trainers. Lacy then activates the Cylons, who then begin to follow her. The Willows are delayed when security doors seal the lab with Amanda and Daniel unaware of the intrusion and linked to the holobands. However, they finally gain access and hold them at gunpoint. Just as Clarice is about to order them killed, Daniel stalls for time, and the original Zoe U-87 Cylon, dormant since the crash, activates. It fatally clubs Nestor with its broken arm, and identifies itself as Zoe, at which point Clarice and Olaf flee. In the Tauron club, while retrieving cash and ID documents, Sam and Joseph fight a number of the Guatrau's men, but Willie is fatally wounded trying to help.
19	"Apotheosis"	Jonas Pate	Kevin Murphy & Jane Espenson	November 30, 2010 (on Space)	0.78
In the aftermath of her failed attempt to kill the Graystones, Singh informs Clarice that he's going to implicate them anyway. He arrests them, but they escape via heli-jet with the help of Cyrus and fly to the city park to find Clarice's holoband. Now in mourning, the Adamas and friends are visited by Fidelia, who realizes the ways of her father are misplaced and outdated. Daniel uses the band and learns the details of the STO plan to blow up the arena and resurrect the STO terrorists in V-world. The Graystones immediately embark on trying to foil the plan in a race against time while being pursued by the GDD. Fidelia manipulates her father and then allows Joseph and Sam to kill him in blood-revenge for Willie, and she assumes his ring and title. With help, Daniel is able to equip a laptop to wirelessly control all Cylons in the vicinity, and four squads of Cylon Marines then drop into the arena by heli-jet. The final battle is a race between the Cylons, Daniel, and the STO, and the Cylons manage to eliminate all but one of the STO terrorists, Olaf, who detonates the vest of explosives he is wearing; however, the resulting damage is localized, and the arena remains largely intact. In the end, Zoe's avatar destroys the virtual heaven with its STO martyrs, and Clarice's apotheosis plan has failed. Scenes from the near future of Caprica are revealed, wherein a new era has dawned. Cylons have become integrated into society, rebuilding the part of the arena that was damaged and performing the jobs that humanity no longer wants. Humanity is thankful, even constructing a monument to the Cylons who stopped the Atlas Arena attack, however the Cylons are still thought of by most as merely tools. Joseph and Evelyn Adama are revealed to have a new son, Bill, who is named after the deceased William in line with Tauron tradition. Despite their foiled plan, the STO remain active. On Gemenon, Lacy Rand has assumed the position of the Blessed Mother, while Clarice Willow has escaped justice for her terrorist activities and begins to preach directly to the Cylons, reinforcing the STO concept that becomes the monotheistic Cylon God. In a virtual church, she tells them that they are God's children, that they are equals with humanity, and that they can become more. She then speaks of the one that loves them all and tells of a prophecy that their belief in God will allow them to crush those who gave them life. A virtual copy of Zoe is in the audience. Finally, a scene is shown of Daniel and Amanda Graystone finally completing a human-looking "skin job" body for their daughter's avatar. Zoe Graystone is then seen rising from a small pool similar to the Cylon resurrection tanks from the Battlestar Galactica series, essentially having been "reborn" in the real world.

== Production ==
=== Concept ===
Caprica differs significantly from its parent series. Ronald D. Moore had strong feelings on the matter, explaining his position that "...you don't try to repeat the formula," and going on to say, "...everything about Caprica was designed specifically to not repeat what we had done in Galactica." Although a critical success, Galactica had a predominantly male audience, and both Moore and the network felt the "war in space" backdrop was a major deterrent to female viewers. With these considerations, and Caprica's storyline already focused on events taking place prior to the two Cylon Wars, the series has a different tone, content, and style. While Caprica contains references to elements of the Battlestar universe, the series was intended to be accessible to new fans.

Whereas the dark, post-apocalyptic reimagined Battlestar Galactica series revolved around a final struggle for survival, Caprica is concerned with a world intoxicated by success. Ronald D. Moore states: "It's about a society that's running out of control with a wild-eyed glint in its eye." The Twelve Colonies are at their peak: self-involved, oblivious, and mesmerized by the seemingly unlimited promise of technology. Framed by the conflict between the Adamas and the Graystones over the resurrection of loved ones lost in an act of terrorism, the series was meant to explore ethical implications of advances in artificial intelligence and robotics.

Caprica is grounded in urban locales rather than in space, and focuses on corporate, political, familial, and personal intrigue, similar in approach to a Greek tragedy. With wealth, corporate intrigue, and the troubled relationship between two families at its center, Moore himself has likened Caprica to the 1980s prime time soap opera Dallas, Like Battlestar Galactica, Caprica had a story arc format.

=== Development ===
During the second season of Battlestar Galactica, series developer Ronald D. Moore and production partner David Eick started speculating about the Battlestar Galactica universe prior to the Cylons. Unable to dedicate serious time to the notion, it remained in the concept stage of development until in early 2006, screenwriter Remi Aubuchon, unaware of the ideas about a Battlestar Galactica prequel, proposed a film about artificial intelligence to Universal Pictures. Though Universal Pictures turned down the project as a movie, Universal Television executives felt Moore and Eick might be interested in Aubuchon's take on the subject and arranged a meeting. Merging the existing thoughts for a Battlestar Galactica prequel with those Aubuchon brought to the table, a general outline for a series emerged.

While the Sci-Fi Channel management was enthusiastic about the idea, they had been engaged in a struggle with Moore about Battlestar Galactica's long storylines, which the network felt kept new viewers from joining. Although Moore's subsequent retooling garnered negative criticism from fans and press alike, and the Sci-Fi Channel eventually admitted that standalone episodes did not work for the show, the network balked at the prospect of another series with a story-arc-heavy format and Caprica got stuck in "development hell".

With Eick and Moore's announcement that Battlestar Galactica was going to end with its fourth season, and after a drawn out pre-development cycle, on March 18, 2008, the Sci-Fi Channel announced that Caprica had been picked up as a two-hour backdoor pilot event, indicating a possible commitment to a series, contingent on ratings. On July 20 of the same year, Sci-Fi announced it was considering picking up Caprica directly as a weekly series, and would make the pilot an extended season premiere. Finally, on December 2, Sci-Fi gave the go-ahead to expand the project into a full series. Production was resumed in July 2009 for an anticipated series premiere in early 2010. The series premiered on January 22, 2010.

=== Filming ===
Universal Media Studios developed the show, in conjunction with Remi Aubuchon and the executive producers of Battlestar Galactica, Ronald D. Moore and David Eick. Aubuchon co-created the show and worked on the pilot, then left to become executive producer of Persons Unknown. The pilot was directed by Friday Night Lights veteran Jeffrey Reiner. Battlestar Galactica's Jane Espenson, Michael Taylor, and Ryan Mottesheard, Pushing Daisies' Kath Lingenfelter, and Friday Night Lights Patrick Massett and John Zinman joined the writing staff. Moore ran the writers room initially, but handed off to Espenson, who was promoted to executive producer and was Caprica's showrunner until November 15, 2009, when it was announced that Kevin Murphy, who had joined as executive producer in October, would assume the role.

The show was shot in and around Vancouver, British Columbia. In the pilot, exterior shots feature many regional landmarks, often augmented using CG imagery. Many of the external scenes were filmed in the Yaletown area of the city, including one distinctive shot of the old railway turntable next to the Roundhouse at Davie and Pacific. The city's library is also featured in one shot (when Daniel and Joseph meet for the first time), just as it was in scenes set in Caprica City in various episodes of Battlestar Galactica.

Vancouver's SkyTrain and one of its stations (Granville) feature in the sequence prior to the terrorist explosion. The production chose to keep the same font and sign style used by the real SkyTrain, but with rebadged signs featuring the name "Caprica City". Several structures found in the financial district of Dubai, United Arab Emirates, have been digitally added to the images of Caprica City to enhance its futuristic look, including one of the Emirates Towers, the Khalifa Tower, and the Dubai Metro.

The exterior shots of the school attended by Zoe Graystone, Lacy Rand and several other characters were filmed outside the Vancouver School of Theology, on the campus of the University of British Columbia.

When Daniel takes Joseph and William to the Pyramid sports match, the colors of Caprica's team (the Buccaneers) are identical to those of Vancouver's real life hockey team, the Canucks. Navy and green stripes adorn the walls outside the team dressing room, suggesting that the scenes were filmed at Rogers Arena.

One of the encounters between Daniel Graystone and Tomas Vergis was filmed in the University of British Columbia's Museum of Anthropology. The sculpture "The Raven and the First Men" was in the background.

There was also significant filming at Central City Shopping Centre in Surrey, B.C., and much of the Simon Fraser University Surrey Campus was transformed to represent various locations in Caprica. For instance, the mezzanine and registrar's office at SFU were used to represent the Caprica Inter-colonial Space Port.

The interior shots of Graystone Industries were almost exclusively filmed at BCIT's Aerospace Technology Campus in Richmond, B.C.

The filming of "Little Tauron" was done in and around Vancouver's Chinatown district with a small number of stores in the area having Greek language signs (ancient and modern Greek was used as the language of the Taurons in Caprica) while the rest of the shops retained their Chinese language signs for the duration of the filming.

== Music ==
Bear McCreary served as the composer for Caprica. His soundtrack for the show was almost entirely orchestral. As on Battlestar Galactica, character themes are used extensively; however, world ethnic influences play a much smaller role. The full ethnic percussion ensemble, including taiko, frame drums, dumbeks, chang changs, tsuzumis and other instruments, was brought in, although used much more sparingly than on Battlestar. The "Tauron Theme" draws inspiration from Russian folk music.

Todd Fancey, best known as a long-time member of the popular indie band New Pornographers, composed "V-Club", a rhythm-intensive track that serves as the theme music for club scenes in the series. This theme was featured prominently in the first preview clip for the new series.

The soundtrack for the Caprica pilot was released on June 16, 2009, by La-La Land Records, and contains 18 tracks. On July 30, 2013, La-La Land Records released a follow-up compilation of music from across the first (and only) season of the show.

== Broadcast ==
The rights to broadcast the series were picked up by Sky1 in the United Kingdom and Ireland, and Space in Canada. Caprica commenced airing in Australia on free-to-air digital channel 7mate on September 30, 2010.

=== Viewership ===
The series earned generally modest ratings, peaking with 1.6 million viewers for the mid-season finale. Season 1.5 debuted with lower ratings, drawing fewer than 900,000 viewers for each episode. Citing these low ratings, Syfy canceled the program on October 27, 2010, and removed the remaining five episodes of the series from its broadcast schedule. The remaining five episodes aired as previously scheduled on Space in Canada, but were not broadcast in the United States until January 4, 2011.

== Reception ==
Caprica received generally positive reviews.

Home Media Magazine's John Latchem wrote that Caprica has "all the same dark overtones and richness of character that fans have come to expect from Galactica." He also wrote that the show "[evokes] a feeling similar to Gattaca in its depiction of a potential near future, while infusing elements of the Matrix and Terminator movies to set up a bridge to the events viewers know will unfold."

The Futon Critic's Brian Ford Sullivan found the first fifteen minutes "A weird mix of teen angst, hedonism and virtual reality ... once established, the world of Caprica has the potential to be just as compelling, interesting and multi faceted as its "sequel" – minus of course the cool stuff blowing up in space. In just 92 minutes, Caprica manages to dish out a surprisingly dense, but not too overwhelming, array of plot threads."

Rob Owen of the Pittsburgh Post-Gazette gave the pilot four out of four stars, stating, "Caprica gives a more forceful, potential-filled first impression than the Battlestar Galactica pilot/miniseries." The Star-Ledger's Alan Sepinwall found the story intriguing, and Stoltz's and Morales's performances excellent, while director Jeffrey Reiner "creates an absolutely gorgeous looking pilot episode."

Joanna Weiss of The Boston Globe wrote that "if this episode is any indication, Caprica will be sinister [and] compelling" and "while the technology is inventive, human emotion still drives the plot." Mark A. Perigard of Boston Herald gave it a B+, stating that the pilot felt more like an intellectual puzzle and lacked the life-or-death intensity of Battlestar Galactica. Lewis Wallace of Wired News rated the pilot an 8/10, saying that Caprica has inherited from Battlestar "the lean writing, the strong acting, the exceptional soundtrack by Bear McCreary", and that "the characters are richly drawn and ripe for further exploration."

Maureen Ryan of Chicago Tribune gave it 3.5 out of 4 stars, with particular praise for the casting of Stoltz, Morales, Malcomson, and Walker. The A.V. Club's Noel Murray said of the show, "Some BSG stalwarts may have some difficulty with the muted science fiction/action elements, but it's a lovely piece of work on its own merits, imbued with real visual poetry by director Jeffrey Reiner."

Ken Tucker from Entertainment Weekly called Caprica "One of the 10 Best Shows on Now", in March 2010.

The New York Times' Mike Hale described Caprica as "the child of Galactica" that "hasn't yet developed enough humor or authentic domestic drama" to reach beyond Battlestar Galactica's fan base. Hale concluded that, compared to its predecessor, "Caprica is, almost by default, a more ordinary show."

On the review aggregator website Rotten Tomatoes, 81% of 27 critics' reviews are positive, with an average rating of 7.3/10. The website's consensus reads: "From the creators of Battlestar Galactica, Caprica features less military and more interpersonal drama, making it more accessible for lighter sci-fi fans." Metacritic listed the show as having a score of 71 based on reviews from 20 critics, indicating "generally favorable reviews".

== Awards and nominations ==
Ceremony	Category	Nominee(s)	Episode	Result
Primetime Emmy Awards	Outstanding Special Visual Effects for a Series	Gary Hutzel, Mike Gibson, Doug Drexler, Jesse Toves, Kyle Toucher, Pierre Drolet, Heather McAuliff, Derek Ledbetter, David R. Morton	"There is Another Sky"	Nominated
Cinema Audio Society Awards	Outstanding Achievement in Sound Mixing for DVD Original Programming	Mike Olman, Ken Kobett, William Skinner		Nominated
IGN Summer Movie Awards	Best TV Sci-Fi Series			Nominated
International Film Music Critics Association	Best Original Score for Television	Bear McCreary		Nominated
Leo Awards	Best Supporting Performance by a Female in a Dramatic Series	Genevieve Buechner	"There is Another Sky"	Nominated
Motion Picture Sound Editors	Best Sound Editing - Direct to Video - Live Action	Daniel Colman, Jack Levy, Jeff K. Brunello, Sam C. Lewis, Vince Balunas, Sara Bencivenga, Stefani Feldman, Michael Baber, Doug Madick, Monique Reymond	"Apotheosis"	Nominated
Visual Effects Society	Outstanding Visual Effects in a Broadcast Series	Mike Gibson, Gary Hutzel, David R. Morton, Jesse Toves		Won

== Home media ==
On April 21, 2009, an uncut and unrated extended version of the pilot was released as a download from online digital media stores and as a complete DVD with commentary, deleted scenes, and video blogs.

The first half of the first season ("Season 1.0") was released on DVD in region 1 on October 5, 2010, and the second half of the season ("Season 1.5") was released on December 21, 2010.

The complete series was released on Blu-ray in France on October 25, 2011. The Region B Blu-ray set is presented in 1080p (the referenced page is incorrect, see their own back cover image) and contains all 18 episodes aired and a selection of bonus features. The set features an English DTS HD Master Audio 5.1 track as well as an English and French Audio 3D one, and comes with English and French subtitles. The series was also released on Blu-ray in Germany and Scandinavia in 2015, and in the UK as part of the Battlestar Galactica – Ultimate Collection boxed set.
