= Battlestar Galactica: Razor =

2007 TV movie

- DVD cover
- Written by: Michael Taylor
- Directed by: Félix Enríquez Alcalá
- Starring: See below
- Composer: Bear McCreary
- Original language: English

Production
- Running time: 81 minutes (broadcast); 101 minutes (extended)
- Production companies: David Eick Productions; NBC Universal Cable; Universal Studios Home Entertainment

Original release
- Network: Sci Fi
- Release: November 24, 2007

Related
- "Crossroads"; "He That Believeth in Me"

Battlestar Galactica: Razor is a television film of the re-imagined Battlestar Galactica television series. It premiered in the United States on Sci Fi, in Canada on the Space channel and in the United Kingdom on Sky One.

== Synopsis (extended version) ==
Razor takes place during the first thirty days of Lee Adama's Pegasus command during the period originally covered in the second half of season 2, after the episode "The Captain's Hand" but before "Lay Down Your Burdens", and uses flashbacks to show Rear Admiral Cain's orders during and shortly after the Cylon attack, as well as events occurring on the final day of the first Cylon War. Cain's actions in the wake of the holocaust are connected to the present by Kendra Shaw, self-described as Cain's legacy.

Events of the final day of the first Cylon war follow Lieutenant William Adama, a Viper pilot and Helena Cain, a child. Flashbacks of Adama discovering a lab housing the early Cylon experiments on humans as well as the first Cylon hybrid and Helena Cain abandoning her little sister during a Cylon invasion of Tauron finish as the first Cylon war ends. Each character is left hanging somewhat (Adama is unable to free the surviving prisoners and Cain cannot find her sister). These are shown to be driving forces for their actions as the show continues. Cain goes on to teach Shaw that you have to become a 'razor' to survive during war while referring to her pocket knife, which later becomes Kendra's and then is passed on to Kara Thrace at the end of the film. Admiral Adama teaches his son Lee a different lesson: that they cannot become butchers.

Lee Adama's priority as Pegasus commander is to restore trust and integrity to the troubled command, while preserving some continuity in the leadership that had evolved under Rear Admiral Cain. He picks Kendra Shaw as his executive officer, promoting her to major, despite the stark contrast between Cain's enthusiastic praise and subsequent Pegasus officers' complaints about Kendra's performance. First boarding Pegasus less than an hour before the Cylon attack on the colonies, Shaw follows Rear Admiral Cain's order to make a "blind jump" that saves the ship from destruction at Scorpion Fleet Shipyards.

Like Gaius Baltar on Galactica, Kendra discovers that the Cylons were about to infect the Pegasus with a computer software virus which would have disarmed Pegasus and left it helpless. After Pegasus receives reconnaissance information that all the colonies have been destroyed, Cain delivers a rallying speech inciting the crew to war for the purpose of revenge. The crew responds by chanting "So say we all!" throughout the ship; the Number Six Cylon agent Gina Inviere awkwardly joins in.

Lee Adama's first mission as commander of Pegasus is a mission to retrieve a lost science team. Antiquated Cylon Raiders from the first war appear and attack Pegasus. Simmering bitterness between Kara and Shaw is exacerbated when Shaw endangers Kara and her wingman to defend the battlestar. Both pilots land safely, though Kara has to destroy a Raider that follows her into Pegasus.

During a heated exchange, Shaw reminds Kara that defying authority is a risky proposition aboard Pegasus, recalling how Cain shot her executive officer, Colonel Jurgen Belzen, for refusing an order to attack a Cylon staging area filled with an unexpectedly strong force of Raiders. It is during this mission that Gina Invierre helps Cylon centurions board the Pegasus and Shaw discovers Gina's true identity. It is hinted that the torture inflicted on Gina at Cain's orders had been influenced by the burgeoning romantic relationship between the Cylon and Cain. When Shaw is promoted to captain by Admiral Cain, she reminds her troubled protégé the Cylon tricked them all.

Viewing the wreckage of the raider, Sharon Valerii notes that Cylon lore tells of a group of original centurions left to guard the first Cylon hybrid. This group, referred to as 'The Guardians', has been missing since the First Cylon War. Admiral Adama then recalls his rookie mission as a Viper pilot, when he encountered that hybrid and saw what the Cylons did to their human captives for their research. Admiral Adama concludes that the Cylons must still be pursuing the experiments, with the captured science team as new test subjects.

Lee Adama approves a plan to use Pegasus to find the basestar and lure the Cylon Raiders away from it, then launch a rescue team—including Kara Thrace and Kendra Shaw—outfitted with a nuclear warhead, in a Raptor. Admiral William Adama transfers his flag to Pegasus to counsel his son on his first command. The diversion succeeds; the rescue team sacrifices its Raptor and boards the basestar.

As the rescue team searches the basestar, the Cylon hybrid can be heard speaking in more coherent phrases than its more-modern counterparts. It repeatedly utters the words "All this has happened before and will happen again". The hybrid also makes a far more elaborate pronouncement,

At last, they have come for me. I feel their lives, their destinies spilling out before me. The denial of the one true path, played out on a world not their own, will end soon enough. Soon there will be four, glorious in awakening, struggling with the knowledge of their true selves. The pain of revelation bringing new clarity. And in the midst of confusion, he will find her. Enemies brought together by impossible longing. Enemies now joined as one. The way forward at once unthinkable, yet inevitable. And the fifth, still in shadow, will claw toward the light, hungering for redemption that will only come in the howl of terrible suffering. I can see them all. The seven, now six, self-described machines who believe themselves without sin. But in time, it is sin that will consume them. They will know enmity, bitterness, the wrenching agony of one splintering into many. And then, they will join the promised land, gathered on the wings of an angel. Not an end, but a beginning.

The science team is found and partly rescued, but the team comes under fire from Cylon centurions. While the team manages to evacuate the basestar in a second Raptor, the nuclear warhead is damaged and has to be detonated manually. Wounded, Shaw remains behind to detonate the warhead and comes face to face with the Cylon hybrid. The hybrid offers absolution to Kendra, who is haunted by the fact that it was she who fired the first shot in the massacre aboard the civilian ship called Scylla as part of an operation to conscript civilians for the Pegasus. The hybrid then tells her that "Kara Thrace will lead the human race to its end. She is the herald of the apocalypse, the harbinger of death. They must not follow her". Shaw tries to relay this information to Lee Adama but is stopped when the Cylons jam communications. Her final act is to detonate the nuclear warhead, destroying the basestar.

On Galactica, Admiral Adama reflects on Cain's legacy and proposes a posthumous commendation for Kendra Shaw, over his son's protests that she and other members of Admiral Cain's crew "butchered innocent civilians". They close their arguments noting that history's first draft will be written in their logs and Lee agrees to consider the commendation.

== Cast ==
The following are listed in order of their prominence on the DVD front cover:

- Michelle Forbes – Admiral Helena Cain
- Stephanie Jacobsen – Major Kendra Shaw
- Mary McDonnell – President Laura Roslin
- Edward James Olmos – Admiral William Adama
- Katee Sackhoff – Captain Kara "Starbuck" Thrace
- Jamie Bamber – Commander Lee "Apollo" Adama
- James Callis – Dr. Gaius Baltar
- Tricia Helfer – Number Six / Gina Inviere
- Grace Park – Number Eight / Sharon Valerii
- Michael Hogan – Colonel Saul Tigh
- Fulvio Cecere – Lieutenant Alastair Thorne
- Nico Cortez – Young William Adama, callsign "Husker"
- Steve Bacic – Colonel Jurgen Belzen
- Graham Beckel – Colonel Jack Fisk
- Campbell Lane – Hybrid

== Production ==
Razor was conceived and partially financed by Universal Studios Home Entertainment, a subsidiary of NBCUniversal. The conglomerate's home video division approached Ronald D. Moore, the show's developer and executive producer, wanting a stand-alone product that could be sold in DVD-Video format only days after its Sci Fi broadcast. Moore called the proposal "an interesting opportunity" made even more attractive by the division's offer to subsidize part of its production costs. Moore was also happy to meet their other requirement, which was to produce 10 to 15 minutes' worth of scenes that would not be part of the broadcast version; he noted on the DVD audio commentary track that such a requirement was not a problem, since the rough cut of most of the show's episodes are always too long. He also noted that the division gave the crew the option of including scenes of violence or sex that would normally not meet Sci Fi's broadcast standards, but in the end Moore chose not to go that route, even cutting a torture scene that was part of the script during principal photography. Because of how the show's third season had ended, Moore decided "there was no way there could be a home video release that could stand alone and also work in the continuity of the show. It had to be something that took place before the season 3 cliffhanger."

According to the DVD commentary, Moore and his editors undertook a significant re-ordering and editing of the rough cut that was based on the script as used during principal photography. The narrative was made more linear, a change that screenwriter Michael Taylor was disappointed about, though he admitted (later in the commentary) that at least one person close to him but not the show—someone who saw both the scripted version and Moore's final version—found it easier to follow. Both Moore and Taylor noted that the end-result occasionally suffers from what they called the phantom limb-like effects that are inevitable when a last-minute re-structuring is done, referring to subtle changes in tone and performance that hint at scenes no longer included or included in a different order. In some cases they were able to compensate with ADR.

Sci Fi Channel confirmed on March 21, 2007, that part of the show's renewal for a fourth season of 22 episodes included a television film to be released sometime in the fall of 2007. The film comprises the first two of 22 episodes.

While Razor is set in the past (in relation to the conclusion of season three), Moore has stated that "the events set up in that story will then pay off in season 4." He explained his rationale for involving the Pegasus, saying that "one of the story lines everyone had really liked was the Pegasus story and the character of Admiral Cain, so we decided to go with that."

In the weeks prior to the movie's premiere on the Sci-Fi Channel, a series of mini "webisodes" (each less than five minutes in length) called Razor Flashbacks were screened online to promote it. These featured a young William Adama (played by Nico Cortez) as a Viper pilot on his first mission at the end of the first Cylon War over 40 years earlier. The inclusion of the first Cylon War was a relevant plot point within the Razor TV movie and viewers got to see Cylon Centurions, Raiders and Basestars similar to those in the original series. Further references to the original series included a golden Centurion commander, and another Cylon saying, "By your command." However, while the Cylon Centurions seen here are similar in design to the original series Cylons (the original actor who provided their voices in the original series returned as well), they were CGI rather than actors in suits.

== DVD release ==
Universal Studios requested that the producers of the Battlestar Galactica TV series make a one-off stand-alone TV movie that could be released on DVD almost immediately after its initial broadcast on television. Staff writer Michael Taylor pitched Moore an idea about the backstory of the Battlestar Pegasus which would work as a stand-alone production but also set up events for the forthcoming final season of the series scheduled for Spring 2008.

Razor was released on Region 1 DVD on December 4, 2007, ten days after airing on the Sci-Fi Channel, and the Region 2 DVD was released on December 26, 2007 (three weeks after airing on Sky One). The DVD releases feature an extended cut of the movie and include extras such as the seven "webisodes" that were created to be screened online in the weeks prior to the movie's broadcast. The Region 1 DVD also has a featurette with cast members discussing their favorite episodes. Razor was released on Region 4 DVD on August 20, 2008, before its Ten HD broadcast premiere on September 4, 2008.

SciFi.com allowed fans to choose the cover art for the DVD release, and the winning cover was announced on September 14, 2007. In the original design of the DVD cover the Battlestar Pegasus is shown to be part of Battlestar Group 75 (BSG-75), which is actually Galactica's group. This was updated online in less than a week to reflect the correct group (BSG-62).

The unrated edition was also included in the Battlestar Galactica Season 4.0 DVD set, released on January 16, 2009. A Blu-ray of the unrated version was released December 28, 2010.

== Reception ==
According to David Howe, executive vice president and general manager of the Sci Fi Channel, special screenings of Razor held in eight U.S. cities "led to lines 'around the block' at participating theaters"; Microsoft sponsored the screenings in New York City, Los Angeles, Philadelphia, Chicago, Boston, San Francisco, Dallas/Fort Worth, and Seattle.

One reviewer called it a "well-crafted, scintillating slice (pardon the pun) of the 'Battlestar' universe" but noted that "fans may be disappointed with the significantly reduced screen time—or total absence—of beloved 'BSG' characters"; the reviewer also made it clear that the producers failed to make it a stand-alone story:

Those not primed in BSG lore and vernacular will be lost in the murky waters of specific references and flashbacks, not to mention the continuous switch from one time period to another. Razor is not for someone just getting into BSG. It's a reward for fans of the show who've been waiting patiently for new episodes.

Brian Lowry of Variety disagreed, saying it "deftly stands on its own while still weaving in the show's dense 'Who's a Cylon? mythology" though a flashback set 40 years before the present would cause "any casual viewer [to] easily throw up their hands"; Lowry also notes that "the focal point of Shaw's story—nicely played by Jacobsen—has the feel of one of those old-time Star Trek or even Bonanza episodes, where a guest star allowed much of the cast to take a bit of a siesta."

Razor was nominated for a 2008 Hugo Award for Best Dramatic Presentation, Short Form, losing to an episode of Doctor Who. It also received two Creative Arts Primetime Emmy nominations, for its cinematography and its sound mixing.

=== Awards ===
==== Wins ====
- VES Awards, Outstanding Visual Effects in a Broadcast Miniseries, Movie, or Special

==== Nominations ====
- Emmy Awards: Outstanding Cinematography for a One Hour Series
- Emmy Awards: Outstanding Sound Mixing for a Comedy or Drama Series (One-Hour)
- Hugo Awards: Best Dramatic Presentation – Short Form
- Saturn Awards: Best Television Presentation
