= Brian Markinson =

American actor

- Born: 1960 or 1961 (age 64–65); New York City, U.S.
- Occupation: Actor
- Years active: 1990–present
- Spouse: Nancy Kerr
- Children: 2

Brian Markinson (born 1960 or 1961) is an American actor who has appeared in a wide variety of films and television shows. Some of Markinson's best known roles include a U.S. Attorney General in Shooter, an unscrupulous industrialist in Godzilla, and a supporting role in Angels in America.

== Personal life ==
Markinson was born into a Jewish family in the New York City borough of Brooklyn. Markinson trained at the Royal Central School of Speech and Drama and subsequently graduated from the American Academy of Dramatic Arts in 1983. He married Canadian Nancy Kerr, and their two sons were both born in Los Angeles in the late 1990s. In 1999 the family moved to Vancouver, British Columbia, Canada, where they have resided since.

== Career ==
Throughout his career, Markinson has appeared in many American and Canadian film and television projects. He frequently plays either an authority figure or a calculating or menacing villain. One of his most prominent roles was as Police Chief Bill Jacobs on Da Vinci's Inquest and Da Vinci's City Hall. He has also appeared on Continuum, Arctic Air, Traveler, NCIS, The L Word, NYPD Blue, Psych, Supernatural, Touching Evil, Taken, Dark Angel, UC: Undercover, Stargate SG-1, Star Trek: The Next Generation, Star Trek: Deep Space Nine, Star Trek: Voyager, The X-Files, Millennium, Mad Men, Fargo, the TV film Lucky 7.

Markinson had appeared in three straight Woody Allen films in supporting character roles: Sweet and Lowdown in 1999, Small Time Crooks in 2000 and The Curse of the Jade Scorpion in 2001. Markinson was also a favorite of Mike Nichols, having appeared in more than six of the late director's projects, including the film Charlie Wilson's War. Markinson is also a stage actor, having performed both on Broadway, Off-Broadway and in regional theatres across Canada; On Broadway, he replaced Kevin Spacey in Lost In Yonkers and in 2016, he led the revival of Tony Kushner's Angels in America at the Arts Club Theatre Company in Vancouver.

== Filmography ==
Year	Title	Role	Notes
1990	China Beach	Del	Episode: "The Call"
1991	Equal Justice	Dr. Christopher Ruttenberg	1 credited episode, 1 uncredited
1991	The Doctor	Michael	
1991	Murphy Brown	Mr. Praskin	Episode: "Be it Ever So Humboldt"
1992	Jake and the Fatman	Stewart's attorney	Episode: "Stormy Weather"
1992	Tequila and Bonetti	Lenny	Episode: "Language of the Heart"
1992	A Woman Scorned: The Betty Broderick Story	colleague	TV movie
1992	L.A. Law	Steve Gerard	Episode: "Double Breasted Suit"
1992	Nails	Calley	TV movie
1992	Sinatra	Sonny Werblin	Miniseries
1993	Law & Order	Unknown	Episode: "Extended Family"
1994	Wolf	Detective Kevin Wade	
1994	Star Trek: The Next Generation	Vorin	Episode: "Homeward"
1994–1998	The X-Files	Tony Fiore / Gary Lambert	Episodes: "Born Again" and "Folie à Deux"
1995	Apollo 13	Pad Rat	
1995	Star Trek: Voyager	Peter Durst / Sulan	Episodes: "Cathexis" and "Faces"
1996	Millennium	Detective Teeple	Episodes: "The Judge", "Blood Relatives" and "Sacrament"
1996	Alien Nation: Millennium	Jason Webster	TV movie
1997	Star Trek Deep Space Nine	Dr. Elias Giger	Episode: "In the Cards"
1997	NYPD Blue	Steve Egan	Episodes: "Lost Israel: Part 1" and "Lost Israel: Part 2"
1998	Primary Colors	Randy Culligan	
1998	Enemy of the State	Brian Blake, Attorney	
1999	Sweet and Lowdown	Bill Shields	
2000	Small Time Crooks	The Cop	
2000	Stargate SG-1	Lotan	Episode: "Scorched Earth"
2001	The Curse of the Jade Scorpion	Al	
2002	Liberty Stands Still	Rex Perry	
2003	Angels in America	Martin Heller	Miniseries
2004	Da Vinci's Inquest	Police Chief Bill Jacobs	Recurring role (seasons 6–7), Main cast (season 8)
2004	Touching Evil	Agent Charles Bernal	Main cast
2004	The Survivors Club	David Price	TV movie
2005–2006	Da Vinci's City Hall	Police Chief Bill Jacobs	Main cast
2005	Knights of the South Bronx	Arnie	TV movie
2005	Lucky 7	Bernie Myer	TV movie
2005, 2012	Supernatural	Jerry Panowski, Stan Thompson	2 episodes
2005	The Dead Zone	The Collector / Masked Man	Episode: "The Collector"
2005	Plague City: SARS in Toronto	Unknown	TV movie
2006	Firestorm: Last Stand at Yellowstone	Scott Clark	TV movie
2006	Saved	Peter	Episode: "Crossroads"
2006	Psych	Hiltz Kooler	Episode: "Shawn vs. the Red Phantom"
2006	Murder on Pleasant Drive	Bob Hilland	
2006	RV	Garry Moiphine	
2006	North of Hope	Al	
2006	Prairie Giant: The Tommy Douglas Story	Jimmie Gardiner	Miniseries
2007–2009	The L Word	Aaron Kornbluth	Recurring role (seasons 4–6)
2007	Charlie Wilson's War	Paul Brown	
2007	Bionic Woman	Vincent Aldridge	Episode: "Shawn vs. the Red Phantom"
2007	Traveler	Ellington	2 episodes
2007	Shooter	Attorney General Russert	
2007	NCIS	Marine EOD Sergeant Dan Trask	Episode: "Skeletons"
2008	Personal Effects	Finneran	
2008	The Quality of Life	Police Chief Bill Jacobs	TV movie
2008	Mayerthorpe	James Roszko	TV movie
2009	Playing for Keeps	Daryl	TV movie
2009	Frankie & Alice	Dr. Warren Backman	
2009	Nora Roberts' High Noon	Captain David McVee	TV movie
2009	Flashpoint	Dale Murray	Episode: "Never Let You Down"
2009–2010	Caprica	Jordan Duram	Main cast
2010	Shattered	Dr. Ryan DiSilvio	Main cast
2010	Triple Dog	Principal Scalco	
2011	Sanctuary	Greg Addison	Recurring role (season 4)
2011	The Killing Game	Detective Robert Spiro / Dom / Kevin Shaw	TV movie
2012	Arrow	Adam Hunt	2 episodes
2012	Saving Hope	Sergeant Jimmy Howard	2 episodes
2012	The Killing	Gil Sloane, Retired Police Officer & Holder's Narcotics Anonymous Sponsor	Recurring role (seasons 1–2)
2012–2013	Battlestar Galactica: Blood & Chrome	Galactica Commander Silas Nash	Main cast (& repackaged as TV movie)
2012–2014	Arctic Air	Ronnie Dearman	Recurring role (seasons 1–3)
2012–2015	Continuum	Vancouver Police Department Inspector Dillon	Main cast (seasons 1–3), recurring role (season 4)
2013	Mad Men	Dr. Arnold Rosen	Recurring role (seasons 6–7)
2013	Down River	Otto	
2013	12 Rounds 2: Reloaded	Heller	
2014	Godzilla	Whelan	
2014	Fargo	Max Gold	2 episodes
2015–2017	Girlfriends' Guide to Divorce	Albert	Recurring role
2015	iZombie	Dr. Holland	2 episodes
2016	The Romeo Section	Norman	Main cast (season 2)
2017	Salvation	Randall Calhoun	Recurring role (season 1)
2018	Backstabbing for Beginners	Rasnetsov	
2018	Take Two	Deacon	3 episodes
2019	A Dog's Way Home	Günter Beckenbauer	
2019	The Magicians	Everett	Recurring role (season 4)
2019	Unspeakable	Roger Perreault	Miniseries
2020	Tribal	Buke	Main cast
2020	Away	George Lane	Recurring role
2024	Allegiance	Max Portman	
2025	Alert: Missing Persons Unit	Walter Evans	Episode: "April"
2025	The Hunting Party	Dr. Lansing	Episode: "Clayton Jessup"
2026	Star Trek: Strange New Worlds	Dr. Philip Boyce	2 episodes
