= List of Caprica characters =

Promotional photo of the cast of Caprica (2010). From left to right: Magda Apanowicz as Lacy, Alessandra Torresani as Zoe, Polly Walker as Clarice, Eric Stoltz as Daniel, Paula Malcomson as Amanda, Sasha Roiz as Sam and Esai Morales as Joseph.

Caprica is an American science fiction drama television series, which is a prequel spin-off of the 2004–2009 series Battlestar Galactica. Caprica is set 58 years before the main series, and shows how humanity first created the Cylon androids who would later turn against their human masters. Among Caprica's main characters are the father and uncle of William Adama, the man who becomes the senior surviving military leader of the fleet which represents the remnants of the Twelve Colonies in Battlestar Galactica. Caprica was broadcast on Syfy from January 22 to November 30, 2010.

== Main characters ==
=== Joseph Adama ===
Joseph Adama is portrayed by Esai Morales and is one of the key characters of the series.

Adama is a civil liberties lawyer with organized crime connections who loses his wife Shannon and daughter Tamara in a bombing. Joseph is left a widower and a single parent of his son William Adama after the bombing. His brother is Samael "Sam" Adama, and both are orphans from Tauron. In an attempt to disguise his Tauron background, Joseph and his family adopted the surname "Adams" and Joseph capricized his first name from the Tauron "Yusif", although he and William reverted to their true surname at the end of the pilot episode. One of his pretrial rituals would be to break pencils and then borrow one from the court clerk to symbolize the breaking of preconceptions and working with what he had. It is known that Joseph used to carry around a silver lighter with his name engraved on it as a source of good luck. In the prequel show of Caprica, the lighter is seen briefly in the episode "The Dirteaters" and was given to Joseph by his first wife Shannon while he was still attending law school. 58 years later during the events of Battlestar Galactica, in the episode "The Hand of God", Commander William Adama hands his son Lee Adama the lighter that his grandfather Joseph used to carry. Before disembarking on a dangerous mission against the Cylons, Lee takes the lighter for good luck promising his father that he'll bring it back. William then replies, "You better, or I'll kick your ass. It's a good lighter."

Joseph Adama was mentioned in Battlestar Galactica, but never appeared on that show as he had died before its events began. He was also one of Romo Lampkin's teachers.

=== Sam Adama ===
Sam Adama is portrayed by Sasha Roiz. He is an enforcer for the Ha'la'tha crime syndicate on Caprica, using a pair of knives as his weapons of choice, notably assassinating a government official who insulted and threatened both the Ha'la'tha and Sam's own brother. His patron god is Mars. Sam Adama's husband, Larry, is a non-Tauron, and they have a child-less marriage due to Adama's dangerous career. Despite this, the couple are active uncles to their nephew William. Sam Adama's brother is Joseph Adama, and both are orphans from Tauron. Fiercely proud of his heritage, Sam occasionally jokes about Joseph changing his ways to fit in with Caprican society. However, Sam is very loyal to his family, taking young William under his wing as Joseph mourns for his wife and daughter. After Amanda Graystone (unbeknownst to anyone, falsely) reveals that her daughter was one of the terrorists that caused Shannon and Tamara's deaths, Sam enthusiastically aids his brother in confronting Daniel Graystone, beating the scientist before Joseph speaks to him. Later, Joseph requests that Sam murder Amanda to "balance it out" between himself and Graystone. Although Sam accepts, he is called off by a guilty Joseph before he can actually harm her.

=== Amanda Graystone ===
Amanda Graystone is portrayed by Paula Malcomson. She is married to technology tycoon Daniel Graystone, and is the mother of Zoe Graystone, who dies in a bombing. Amanda is a formidable force in her own right, with a steely will and a successful career as a surgeon. Devastated by a tragic turn of events, she embarks on a quest to discover the truth that lies behind what she knows about her daughter Zoe.

Given her conversation about Scorpian ambrosia with Sister Clarice, she may be from another Colony, possibly Scorpia. Soon after the train bombing, Amanda begins to have flashes of her past when she was a teenager. It was during those days she had a brother named Darius, who was with her in a car crash on a dark and stormy night. Darius was killed in the crash; Amanda suffered an emotional break-down period and was sent to a mental institution in the city of Delphi. During her treatment, Darius appears to her as a spirit in visions; Amanda believes that her brother is trying to tell her something. Unable to separate fiction from reality, Amanda's mental condition worsens, leading her to attempt suicide.

In the Episode "End of Line" Amanda once again attempts suicide by jumping off the Pantheon Bridge after finding that her husband Daniel was involved in the murder of two men. Three weeks later, Daniel still grieves of Amanda's suicide. Surprisingly, it was revealed at the end of episode "Unvanquished", Amanda survived the jump and that she was hospitalized for the last three weeks and is hiding somewhere in the forest at a resort cabin. Daniel implores his wife to see him, but Amanda refuses to talk with him. Clarice Willow returns from her trip to Gemenon and walks through the door of the same cabin Amanda is in. Clarice then remarks, "It's good to be home."

In Battlestar Galactica episode "The Farm", Starbuck was being treated for a gunshot wound at the Delphi hospital after running into a Cylon ambush. The doctor taking care of her turned out to be a Simon No. 4. Cylon. He mentions that the Delphi hospital used to be a mental institution when 58 years prior, the same institution Amanda was treated for her illness. After Caprica's Fall, the hospital was converted into the Cylon's experimental 'Farm'.

=== Daniel Graystone ===
Daniel Graystone is portrayed by Eric Stoltz. The character is the CEO of Graystone Industries. He is the inventor of the Holoband (a device worn about the head which allows the user to enter V-Space) and of the first Colonial Cylon.

=== Zoe Graystone ===
Zoe Graystone and her virtual copy Zoe-Avatar are portrayed by Alessandra Torresani. In the first episode, Zoe-Avatar is downloaded into the first Cylon created by Daniel Graystone. She is one of the primary characters in the series.

=== Lacy Rand ===
Lacy Rand is portrayed by Magda Apanowicz. She is a student at the academy and Zoe Graystone's best friend. Lacy joins the Soldiers of the One along with Zoe and Ben but at the last moment refuses to join them on their journey to Gemenon. The train bombing comes as a shock to Lacy who had been unaware of the group's terrorist leanings. At Clarice Willow's suggestion, Lacy visits the virtual world where she encounters Zoe's avatar. She agrees to help Daniel Graystone meet the avatar of his dead daughter ("Avatar Zoe"). After it appears that Avatar Zoe is lost as well, the avatar calls Lacy for help. Lacy is the only person who knows that Zoe's avatar remains in the Cylon body, and Lacy, despite her misgivings, agrees to help Avatar Zoe travel to Gemenon. Clarice Willow continually presses Lacy for information on Zoe's work, even attempting to use her younger husband, Nestor, to flirt with her. However, Lacy is conscious of Clarice's manipulation and reveals nothing. She meets with terrorist leader Barnabas to ask his help to get her and Zoe to Gemenon. She is unable to get Zoe there and is eventually sent to Gemenon against her will. Once there, she goes through the rigors of STO training, eventually discovering that she can command the Cylons that were secretly shipped to the STO by the Ha'la'tha. In a flash forward at the end of the series, it is revealed that Lacy has used the Cylons to become the new Mother of the Church.

=== Clarice Willow ===
Clarice Willow is portrayed by Polly Walker. She is a high priestess of Athena and the headmistress of the Athena Academy. This is merely a cover, however, as Willow is a member of the monotheistic terrorist group known as the Soldiers of the One. She was born on Sagittaron. It was shown in the second episode that Willow is involved in a group marriage with at least four husbands and three other wives. Whilst unusual, group marriage is legal on Caprica. Although she starts off as a well-meaning monotheist, she embraces extremism as the series continues.

== Recurring characters ==
=== Tamara Adama ===
Tamara (portrayed by Genevieve Buechner) is the teenaged daughter of Joseph and Shannon. She is among those killed in the train bombing portrayed in the Caprica pilot. After her death, Daniel Graystone uses a computer program written by his daughter Zoe to create Tamara's virtual avatar, Tamara-A, who later finds her way into the V-Club. Tamara-A is initially unaware that the real Tamara has died, and believes that she is the real Tamara and just needs to be woken up. A gamer named Vesta eventually breaks the news to the devastated girl. Tamara-A shoots Vesta and asks Heracles to find her father and tell him that she still exists in the V world. Learning that his daughter Tamara is still alive as an avatar, Joseph attempts to seek her out in V-World no matter what, even if it means ignoring his responsibilities as a father to William and refusing to move on with his life after granting Tamara's soul passage to the afterlife. Realizing her full potential and invulnerability against all odds, Tamara becomes an influential icon in New Cap City stirring a cult following of her undying stature. Her father Joseph becomes a player in New Cap City and discovers her initials all over the city, the same initials she used to draw when she was a child. Tamara unexpectedly receives a visit from a stranger named Emmanuelle, who is actually Evelyn in the real world, delivering the news that her father Joseph is desperately searching for her. Emmanuelle persuades Tamara to kill Joseph's avatar for the sake of his well-being, to help him finally let go of his grief. Shortly after, Joseph is at long last reunited with Tamara in her apartment. Instead of being greeted with a loving father-to-daughter moment, he is met with protest and disgrace. Tamara tries to convince her father that he is killing himself in V-World by taking virtual amp drugs, ignoring his responsibilities to her brother William, living little of his actual life, and unable to let go of the memories that was his real daughter. Tamara then shoots herself. Before she can recover from her injury, she turns the gun on Joseph and pulls the trigger, killing his avatar and banning him from V-World indefinitely. Tamara utters that she'll always love her father.

Over the next three weeks, Tamara's cult status in V-World grows, eventually catching the attention of Zoe Graystone's avatar, now known as the "Dead-Walker." Zoe encounters a group of thugs on the streets of New Cap City fighting them off one-by-one with a katana sword. The gang members turn out to be followers of Tamara, each of them marked with tattoos of Tamara's 'T' initials on their foreheads. Before Zoe kills the last gang member, she tells him that she is searching for the other "Dead-Walker" that is Tamara. Zoe tracks Tamara's whereabouts to the virtual sword fighting arena, only to be ruthlessly stabbed & gunned down by both Tamara & her people. When Zoe recovers, Tamara then fights her on a one-on-one sword fighting match. Zoe gains the upper hand and defeats her in the ring. Despite her defeat, Tamara constantly blames Zoe for killing both her and her mother on the Mag-Lev Train. Zoe tries to get Tamara to understand that she had nothing to do with the bombing and that the real Zoe Graystone is dead. That no matter how many times they fight, they cannot be killed. Tamara finally lays down her contempt for Zoe and the two of them set off to use their abilities to clean up New Cap City of its decadence and corruption.

It was later revealed by showrunner Kevin Murphy that Tamara eventually became the basis for the Number Eights.

=== William Adama ===
William "Willie" Adama (born William Adams on Caprica), portrayed by Sina Najafi, is the second child of Joseph and Shannon. He was named for his paternal grandfather who was killed in the Tauron Civil War. Although the audience was led to believe that Willie was William Adama himself, a twist ending revealed that Willie was accidentally shot and killed when he was a boy by the Tauron crime syndicate, the Ha'la'tha. The William Adama from Battlestar Galactica, who goes by Bill rather than Willie, is the son of Joseph and Evelyn, who named him after his deceased brother after Tauron custom. Young Bill Adama is played by Markus Towfigh.

=== Jordan Duram ===
Jordan Duram is portrayed by Brian Markinson. Duram is an agent for the Global Defense Department investigating the train bombing.

=== Keon Gatwick ===
Keon Gatwick, portrayed by Liam Sproule, is a student at the Athena Academy as well as a member of the Soldiers of the One. He helps Lacy contact Barnabas Greeley. It is revealed at the end of the meeting that Keon is the one who constructed that bomb that Ben used, although he did not know what he was using it for.

=== Barnabas Greeley ===
Barnabas Greeley, portrayed by James Marsters, is a terrorist leader and member of the Soldiers of the One. Barnabas is suspicious of Lacy, and often comes to odds with her. His main rival, however, is Clarice. The two of them jockey for power and control of STO. Clarice kills Barnabas and the rest of his crew other than Lacy, after receiving permission from the Mother to do so. He appears in episodes, 6, 9, 10 and 11.

=== Priyah Magnus ===
Priyah Magnus, portrayed by Luciana Carro, is a public relations officer hired by Daniel Graystone. She came to Caprica from her homeworld of Sagittaron to do public relations.

=== Philomon ===
Philomon (Alex Arsenault) is a technician working for Daniel Graystone. He begins to develop feelings for Zoe-R through her alias Rachel. In the episode "End of Line", he is killed by Zoe-R as she escapes the lab. Philomon is the first human to die at the hands of a Colonial Cylon, before the Cylon War and 58 years before the fall of the colonies in Battlestar Galactica.

=== Ruth ===
Ruth (played by Karen Elizabeth Austin) is the mother of Shannon Adams, who takes over the day-to-day duties of the Adama household after the train bombing. Ruth, a former Ha'la'tha assassin, adheres to Tauran traditions and customs and often tries to encourage Joseph to ensure that Willie stays in touch with his Tauran ethnicity. Ruth is suspicious of Caprican society and its customs and approves of Willie's association with Sam. She also believes in traditional Tauran justice and hints to Joseph that he should use the Ha'la'tha to seek revenge against the Graystone family for the loss of Shannon and Tamara.

=== Baxter Sarno ===
Baxter Sarno, played by Patton Oswalt, is a talk show host.

=== Gara Singh ===
Gara Singh, played by Peter Wingfield, is the Director of the Caprica City bureau of the Caprican Global Defense Department in the years before the First Cylon War.

=== Tad Thorean (Heracles) ===
Tad Thorean is portrayed by Richard Harmon. Under the alias Heracles, he is a holoband-gamer who helps Tamara. After he finds out that Tamara is really dead, he helps her father, Joseph Adama, try to find her. He is "killed" in V-World and can no longer access New Cap City. He feels like a nobody in life, and that the game allows him to be important.

=== Larry ===
Larry is Sam Adama's husband. He is portrayed by Julius Chapple. He appears in four episodes: "Reins of a Waterfall", "There Is Another Sky", "False Labor" and " Apotheosis". In "Reins of a Waterfall", Sam is seen cleaning the dinner table for his husband Larry and his nephew Willie, who asks them about why they do not have any children. Neither of them hide the fact that it is due to the violent nature of Sam's job. His surname is unknown; it has not been revealed how surnames are usually handled in same-sex marriages within the Twelve Colonies of Kobol.

=== Tomas Vergis ===
Tomas Vergis (John Pyper-Ferguson) is a Tauron computer scientist and a business rival with Daniel Graystone. He is the inventor of the meta-cognitive processor that was stolen at the request of Daniel Graystone and used in the first Cylon, and accidentally became the location of the Zoe Avatar. When Tomas learned that his MCP was stolen and two of his assistants were murdered, he vowed to avenge their deaths by destroying everything Daniel valued. Briefly, Tomas took control of Greystone Industries through manipulation of the Caprican military, the client of the Cylon robots, when Tomas showed that Daniel could not fulfil the terms of the contract in time. With the help of Joseph and Sam Adama, the board of directors of Greystone Industries were blackmailed to reinstate Daniel as CEO. Once this happened, and Tomas learned of Ha'la'tha involvement in his removal, Tomas went to Daniel's home stating he would not be able to leave Caprica alive and return to his home of Tauron, and requested that Daniel kill him with the Vergis family dagger Tomas had brought with him. Daniel refused, and offered instead a pact with Tomas to go after the Ha'la'tha. Tomas seemed intrigued by the idea, but at the last minute, when asking Daniel to take a blood oath using the dagger, Tomas grabbed Daniel's hand and thrust the dagger into his own chest, killing himself.

=== Nestor Willow ===
Nestor Willow (Scott Porter) is the youngest of Clarice's husbands – she herself acknowledges that he is young enough to be her son. He is a college student studying computer science. Of the Willows, Nestor is the most closely connected to the STO after Clarice and Olaf, and has been shown to have sexual relations with both of them. Nestor is killed by Zoe-R during a disastrous break-in at the Greystone mansion.

=== Mar-Beth Willow ===
Mar-Beth is one of Clarice Willow's wives and member of the STO. She features in the second part of Caprica "Things We Lock Away", informing Clarice that she feels uncomfortable with Lacy Rand, who is being held captive by Clarice, in the attic. She also appears in "False-Labour", giving birth to her child. She is killed by Clarice when Agent Durham sends false information to Gara Singh which states that Mar-Beth is the traitor, in order to protect Amanda. Singh sends the information to Clarice who cuts Mar-Beth's throat in a park.

=== Evelyn Adama ===
Evelyn Adama, portrayed by Teryl Rothery, is Joseph Adama's law partner and long-time friend since college. It's clear she has always harbored an attraction toward Joseph and after his wife and daughter are killed, she helps him with his law practice and his family. As Joseph's obsession with finding Tamara in the virtual world grows, Evelyn creates an avatar, Emmanuelle, to try and stop him (Joseph never realizes this, since Emmanuelle is programmed to look nothing like Evelyn). Evelyn is surprised when Joseph's mother-in-law, Ruth, tells her she should be more than just friends for Joseph, recognizing Evelyn's feelings. The two eventually begin a romantic relationship and Evelyn is present when Willie Adama is shot and killed. She and Joseph marry and have a son who, in keeping with tradition, they name William after his late brother.

=== Cyrus Xander ===
Cyrus Xander is portrayed by Hiro Kanagawa. Xander is Daniel Graystone's chief confidante at Greystone Industries.

== Minor characters ==
=== Shannon Adama ===
Shannon Adama (Anna Galvin) is married to Joseph and the mother of William and Tamara, who is among those killed in the train bombing in the Caprica pilot.

=== Mother ===
The Mother (Meg Tilly) is the leader of the Monad Church — the monotheistic religion based on Gemenon. In the episode "Unvanquished" she first backs Obal Ferras' move to remove Clarice Willow from the STO (the Monad Church's militant faction), but stands by as Willow turns the attempt around and has Ferras killed. Afterward, Mother blesses Willow's leadership of the STO, including a purge of those loyal to Ferras. In a flash forward at the end of the series, it is revealed that Lacy Rand has used the Cylons to usurp Mother's position. According to the writers, had Caprica continued for a second season, Mother would have allied with Daniel Graystone in the hopes of reclaiming the Church.

=== Ben Stark ===
The student suicide bomber responsible for the MagLev bombing that sets the events of the series in motion. He was romantically involved with Zoe Graystone, though she hid the relationship from her parents and neither she nor the rest of the STO was aware of what he planned. He was played by Victorious star Avan Jogia.

=== Obal Ferras ===
Obal Ferras is a member of the Monad Church. He is killed by other members of the church when he attempts to kill Clarice Willow.

== Other ==
- Olaf Willow (played by Panou)
- Minister for Defence Val Chambers (played by William B. Davis)
- The Guatrau (played by Jorge Montesi)
- Caston (played by Katie Keating)
- Crew Member (played by Maggie Ma)
- Secretary of State for Defence Joan Leyte (played by Veena Sood)
- Vesta (played by Camille Mitchell)
