= Battlestar Galactica (fictional spacecraft) =

In both continuities of the Battlestar Galactica franchise, the main setting is a spacecraft called the Battlestar Galactica.

In both series, the Galactica is a large capital ship which can launch squadrons of Viper single-man fighters and is capable of faster-than-light travel. Galactica is depicted as one of several Battlestars of the Colonial (human) military, but is apparently the only Battlestar to survive the massive Cylon attack that begins the series. Commanded by a character called Adama, the Galactica leads the remnants of humanity in fleet of civilian ships to the mystical planet of "Earth".

== Battlestar Galactica (1978, 1980) ==
Galactica (1978 version)

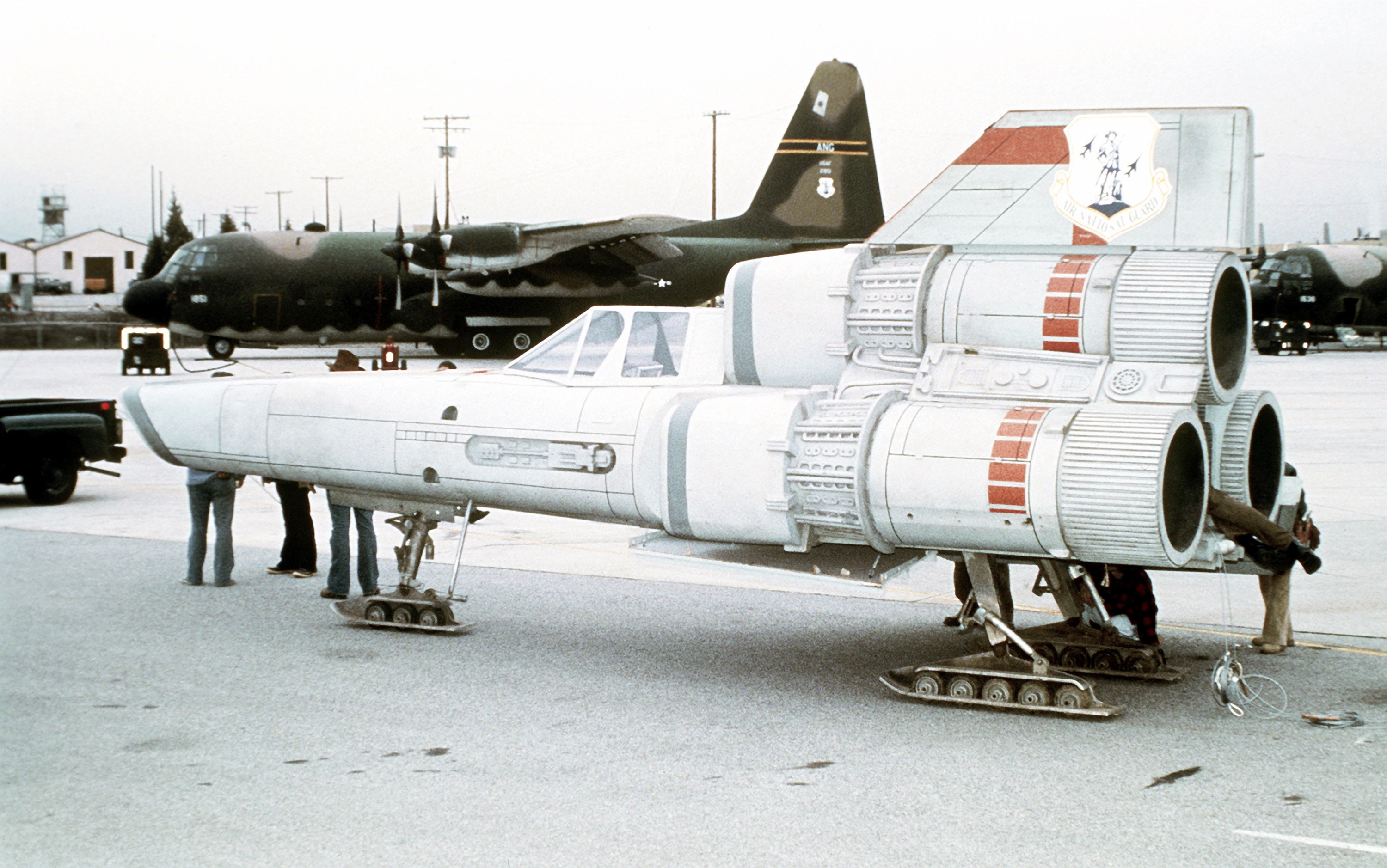
Colonial Viper as it appears in Galactica 1980

=== Filming model ===
The miniature used for external shots of the Galactica was approximately six feet (1.8 m) long and weighed 70 pounds (32 kg).

=== Depiction ===
In the original Battlestar Galactica series and its sequel Galactica 1980, the Galactica is a carrier warcraft constructed by the Twelve Colonies of Man, a flag vessel of the colonial planet Caprica commanded by Commander Adama. Galactica was launched 500 years before the events of the Thousand Yahren War which concluded during the series pilot episode.

In the pre-Holocaust Colonial Service, Battlestars like Galactica operated as part of numbered naval fleets (e.g., the Fourth Fleet). A typical fleet comprised 600 fighting ships and operated independently of other fleets.

As well as Galactica, eight other Battlestars are mentioned in the series and are considered canon: Acropolis, Atlantia, Columbia, Galactica, Pacifica, Pegasus, Rycon, and Triton. All of these are believed destroyed with the destruction of the Twelve Colonies, until Battlestar Pegasus briefly reappears in the two-part episode "The Living Legend".

Galactica is depicted as capable of lightspeed travel, although while escorting the refugee fleet she must limit her speed to that of the slowest ship. Galactica also has a complement of shuttles. Unlike similar civilian models, these transport craft include military gear for detecting electronic emissions from other spacecraft and drop chutes for paratroop assaults. In addition, Galactica has armored, tracked ground vehicles known as "land rams" and "snow rams." These are armed with an open turret on the roof and are landed by shuttles. Galactica carries a large number of manually aimed laser batteries, both for anti-aircraft defense against fighters and for engaging other capital ships. Galactica is protected by both "electronic shields" and a heavy metal double-pocket hatch shield that covers its panoramic bridge viewport; the latter is closed in "positive shield" state and open in "negative shield" state. They are insufficient against suicide ramming runs by Cylon raiders or pulsar-cannon fire from Cylon base ships. Galactica can project a broad cone of energy, wide enough to cover much of one hemisphere of an Earth-sized planet, that is powerful enough to destroy ballistic missiles and their nuclear warheads.

Vipers are single-pilot starfighters, armed with two-forward mounted laser-torpedo guns and deployed from Battlestars.

A Battlestar such as Galactica has two sources of energy. The engines are powered by Tylium, a highly volatile liquid fuel derived from minerals mined on certain planets. The Tylium is stored in two tanks located inboard, since the detonation of either tank is sufficient to destroy the Battlestar. Other energy needs are met by energizers, self-contained generators roughly the size of a human adult. These are located all across Galactica. Networked to each other, they are able to supply sufficient power to meet Galactica's needs even if some of them should fail.

== Re-imagined Battlestar Galactica (2003 series) ==
Battlestar Galactica
- First appearance: Miniseries, Part 1

Information
- Affiliation: Colonial Fleet
- Auxiliary vehicles: Colonial Raptors; Colonial Vipers

General characteristics
- Class: Jupiter
- Registry: BS-75
- Armaments: Primary kinetic-energy weapons Point defense kinetic-energy weapons Ship-to-ship missiles Nuclear weapons
- Maximum speed: Sublight: 1,000–1,500 km (620–930 mi) per second
- Propulsion: FTL drives Sublight engines
- Length: 1,445 metres (4,741 ft)

=== Design ===
As well as being more streamlined than the original, designer Eric Chu's new Galactica replaced the original's single aft thruster with top-mounted twin thrusters. The ribbing of the hull was influenced by Andrea Branzi ribbed vases. One of Chu's discarded concepts was later reworked to become Battlestar Pegasus, featured in seasons 2 and 3 and Battlestar Galactica: Razor.

According to Animation World Network (AWN), the design was influenced by "retro sci-fi". AWN commentator Mary Ann Skweres wrote: "For engines in Star Trek, a glow is added on the back end of the ship. On the Galactica, the engine fires up and jets shoot out. Its a visual dialog that people understand."

To further distinguish the series from Star Trek, in which the ship's bridge has a captain's chair, the Galactica control room was built without an assigned seat for the commanding officer. Screen Rant praised this decision, stating that having Adama and his senior staff stand, instead of sit, "undeniably helped Battlestar Galactica position itself as the grounded alternative to Star Trek."

For the prequel Battlestar Galactica: Blood & Chrome, most of which was made using computer animation or greenscreen instead of detailed physical sets, the visual effects unit used LightWave 3D software to create larger versions of the Galactica's interiors. According to effects supervisor Doug Drexler, "because the show was all greenscreen, we had an opportunity to expand the ship and give it greater scope."

=== Depiction ===
The Galactica of the re-imagined series was somewhat similar in design to that of the original series, with some adjustments to suggest a more heavily armored, utilitarian, craft. Apart from its spaceflight capabilities, including its FTL drive, the technology of the Galactica is reminiscent of a twentieth-century aircraft carrier.

Galactica (BS-75) entered service in the early years of the First Cylon War, under the command of Commander Silas Nash. During her service, Galactica formed a part of Battlestar Group 75 (BSG 75), a colonial force described by series creator Ronald D. Moore as a mixed force of vessels somewhat similar to a U.S. Navy carrier strike group.

The prequel web series Battlestar Galactica: Blood & Chrome depicts a young William Adama's posting to Galactica during the First Cylon War.

By the time of the series' opening, the Galactica, now commanded by Adama, is fifty years old, shown to be considered antiquated by contemporary standards, and is undergoing formal decommissioning from the Colonial Fleet following her retirement as an operational vessel. The ship was to become a museum commemorating the First Cylon War and an educational center; much of its outer armor and weapons having already been stripped. Galactica's starboard launch pod was outfitted as a Cylon war museum. Galactica's lack of network integration at the time of the Cylon attack is the reason for its survival; Galactica is unaffected by the infiltration program used by the Cylons to disable colonial vessels and defense systems. Galactica's crew are able to return Galactica to fighting condition, pressing Vipers fighters meant for Galactica's museum display into service. Galactica retained a workable flight pod on its port side, allowing it to operate Vipers and Raptors (small shuttle craft with independent FTL capabilities). Galactica is able to escape to protect a small fleet of civilian vessels searching for the legendary planet Earth.

Galactica is commanded from a Command Information Centre (CIC), deep within the ship. As well as its Vipers and Raptors, Galactica has various point defence armaments, missiles, and a small number of nuclear weapons.

Galactica is home to most of the main human characters of the series, though President Laura Roslin chooses to reside on Colonial One, a civilian ship. While primarily a military vessel, Galactica begins to host a significant number of civilians in the unused starboard flight pod from the third season.

Over the course of the series Galactica undergoes multiple engagements with the Cylons, taking many hits, including nuclear strikes. On external shots, progressively more damage is shown with a hull darkened by with burn marks and missile hits. Towards the series end, the engineer Chief Tyrol finds that progressive damage has created structural problems that are irreparable. Ultimately Adama orders the ship to be abandoned and stripped of weapons, parts and supplies. Galactica undergoes one last mission to attack the Cylon Colony, and afterwards barely survives a final FTL jump to Earth.

At the end of the series, Galactica and the other ships in the fleet are abandoned. Admiral Adama flies the last Viper off the ship, and the Battlestar and its fleet are scuttled by Samuel Anders, who pilots them on their last flight directly into the Sun.
