= William Adama =

Character in Battlestar Galactica (2004)

- Battlestar Galactica character
- Edward James Olmos as William Adama
- First appearance: Miniseries (2003)
- Portrayed by: Edward James Olmos (Battlestar Galactica); Nico Cortez (Razor Flashbacks); Markus Towfigh (Caprica); Luke Pasqualino (Battlestar Galactica: Blood & Chrome)

In-universe information
- Nickname: Husker (callsign)
- Species: Human
- Gender: Male
- Title(s): Commander (BSG Miniseries – Episode 2.12); Rear Admiral (Episodes 2.13 – 4.22); Commanding Officer of the Battlestar Galactica (BSG Miniseries – Episode 4.22)
- Occupation: Colonial Fleet
- Colony: Caprica, of Tauron descent

William "Bill" Adama (callsign "Husker") is a fictional character in the re-imagined Battlestar Galactica television series produced and aired by the SyFy cable network. He is one of the main characters in the series and is portrayed by Edward James Olmos. The character is a reimagining of Commander Adama from the 1978 Battlestar Galactica series, originally played by Lorne Greene.

== Character biography ==
=== Childhood ===
In the Caprica spinoff series, Markus Towfigh plays Bill Adama as a young boy. Adama was born on Caprica, the son of Joseph Adama (a civil liberties lawyer and previously a lawyer for the Ha'la'tha, the Tauron resistance movement turned mob) and Joseph's second wife, Evelyn Adama (an accountant). He is named in honor of his deceased older half-brother William "Willie" Adama in accord with Tauron tradition. Both were named after their grandfather, who along with their grandmother Isabelle was killed during the Tauron Uprising.

Bill was the only child of Joseph and Evelyn, though he is Joseph's third child, a half-brother to Joseph's children Tamara and Willie with his first wife Shannon, who died in the year YR42 on the Colonial calendar (as depicted in the prequel series Caprica). Bill Adama had at least three uncles: Joseph's brother Sam Adama (a Ha'la'tha enforcer on Caprica), Sam's husband Larry, and Evelyn's brother on Tauron who owned a ranch near a river and used trained dogs to drive foxes into the river. Shannon Adama's mother, Ruth, was also part of the Adama family during Bill's childhood, though not related to him by blood.

=== Military service ===
Admiral Adama's Military service record is shown in the dossier prepared by Billy Keikeya in the episode "Hero". It lists the following events in his service history:

- D6/21311 – First commission: Battlestar Galactica air group
- E4/21312 – Commendation for shooting down Cylon fighter in first viper combat mission
- D5/21314 – Mustered out of service post-armistice
- R6/21317 – Served as Deck Hand in merchant fleet and as common [...] aboard inter-colony tramp freighters
- D1/21331 – Recommissioned in Colonial Fleet
- D6/21337 – Major: Battlestar Atlantia
- R8/21341 – Colonel: Executive Officer: Battlestar Columbia
- C2/21345 – Commander: Commanding Officer, Battlestar Valkyrie
- C2/21348 – Commander: Commanding Officer, Battlestar Galactica

After the death of Admiral Helena Cain, Adama is promoted to admiral, in light of the fact that he has now had charge of more than one battlestar. He retains the rank after the Battlestar Pegasus is destroyed.

=== First Cylon War ===
As depicted in Battlestar Galactica: Blood & Chrome, Adama (played by Luke Pasqualino) is a new Academy graduate during the tenth year of the First Cylon War. He is assigned to the Galactica, the newest battlestar in the Colonial fleet. His aviator call sign is "Husker", originally bestowed on him by his copilot Coker Fasjovik. The name is an Aerilon term for farmboy or hick, but Adama was actually raised in Caprica City. His first mission is to pilot a Raptor, taking a civilian software engineer into hostile Cylon territory. Following that mission, he is assigned a Viper and assigned to a joint special ops unit of fighter pilots, infantry and marines.

In Battlestar Galactica: Razor Flashbacks, Adama (played by Nico Cortez) becomes involved with a Raptor pilot named Jaycie McGavin. Arriving on the hangar deck for his first Viper combat mission, he finds McGavin has been mortally wounded in combat after her Raptor's control console explodes. He receives a commendation for this mission. Adama was aboard the Galactica during the last week of the war when a Cylon boarding party attempted to kill the crew by depressurizing the ship. Adama later recalls that "two thousand men bought the farm."

During a battle on the last day of the First Cylon War, Adama became enraged by the destruction of the Battlestar Columbia and pursued two Cylon raiders into a planetary atmosphere. His Viper was damaged in a collision and he was forced to eject; he engaged a Cylon centurion in a gunfight whilst free-falling. Upon landing, he discovered a Cylon lab where experimentation on human subjects was taking place. Unable to rescue the humans held captive in the lab, Adama watched helplessly as the Cylons evacuated the base. When he radioed for rescue, he was told that an armistice had been made with the Cylons. With the hostilities at an end, the Cylons carried away whatever they were developing, unopposed.

=== After the war ===
After the war ended, Adama married his wife Carolanne Adama and fathered two sons with her: Zak and Lee. Adama later relates to Captain Louanne "Kat" Katraine how, during both her pregnancies, Carolanne was convinced that she was carrying a daughter, and was surprised by the arrival of a son. Adama himself would have liked a daughter, saying that "three's a good round number".

Like many servicemen Adama was released from military career after the war ended. He found himself serving on a commercial freighter on the Caprica-Tauron run, where he met a fellow former Viper pilot, Saul Tigh. The pair forged a lasting friendship.

=== Return to the Fleet ===
During this period, Adama used his wife's family's connections in the Defense Council to get himself reinstated in the Colonial Fleet as a captain. Once he had been promoted to the rank of major, he secured Tigh's reinstatement in the Fleet as well. He later divorced Carolanne; she was engaged to be married at the time of the Cylon attack on the Twelve Colonies of Kobol.

As a major, Adama served on the Battlestar Atlantia, where he had an ongoing feud with the ship's landing signal officer that inspired a celebration of his thousandth landing. He later served as the executive officer of the Battlestar Columbia, presumably as a colonel, and skippered three Colonial escort vessels before earning his own command, the Battlestar Valkyrie. Adama brought his old friend, Saul Tigh, with him as his XO. At some point during this phase of his career, Adama either served aboard or visited a Mercury class battlestar.

Approximately three years before the Destruction of the Twelve Colonies, the Colonial Admiralty ordered then-Commander Adama and the Valkyrie to test the Cylons' military disposition with a covert (and illegal) surveillance mission across the Armistice Line. The Stealthstar reconnaissance craft was discovered by the Cylons and damaged; Adama ordered the Valkyrie's weapons batteries to shoot it down to prevent its capture. These events precipitated his transfer to the aging Battlestar Galactica as a graceful swan-song to his career before returning to haunt him three years later.

Both William Adama's sons chose to follow in their father's footsteps and become Viper pilots. While Lee went on to become an accomplished pilot, Zak was not a natural in the cockpit. While in training, Zak began a secret relationship with Kara "Starbuck" Thrace, his flight instructor. Zak would have failed basic flight training had Kara not passed him based on her feelings for him (he had recently proposed to her). During an operational flight, Zak's Viper crashed and he was killed. This tragedy drove a wedge between Adama and his surviving son, Lee, who blamed his father for pushing Zak into military service. It was also during this time that William Adama met Kara, sparking a father-daughter relationship.

=== After the Cylon attack ===
Two years after Zak's death, the fifty-year-old Galactica was nearing the end of its service, destined to be converted into a museum ship. On the morning following the ship's decommissioning ceremony (Caprica City Time), the Cylons launched a surprise attack on the Twelve Colonies of Kobol, bombarding the colonies with nuclear weapons and destroying the majority of the Colonial Fleet. The Fleet was unable to mount an effective counterattack due to Cylon infiltration of the Colonial ships' Command Navigation Program (CNP).

Since Adama fought in the first Cylon War, he knew that the Cylons could use electronics as part of their offensive repertoire. Adama's experiences with the Cylons left him with a healthy distrust of sophisticated computer systems and heavy automation. He therefore decreed that as part of Galactica's standing orders, her computer systems were never to be networked, and even though Galactica had Baltar's CNP program installed on its systems, thanks to Adama's orders it was never loaded into primary memory. As a result, the outmoded, aging Galactica was spared from Cylon infiltration attempts that crippled and subsequently destroyed much of the Colonial Fleet. However, most of Galactica's Viper Mark VII fighters did possess the CNP and were lost early in the attack. Fortunately, as part of its museum display, the Galactica had forty older Mk II Vipers on board, including Adama's personal fighter from the First Cylon War. The CNP was later purged from Galactica's systems as well as the remainder of the Mark VII fighters.

Following the devastating attack on the Colonies, Commander Adama felt that the best course of action was a counterattack, to avenge the deaths of billions, and stand and fight for whatever was left of their civilization. He sent a message into deep space, calling for all remaining Colonial ships to regroup at Ragnar Anchorage, an unmanned munitions depot hidden in the upper atmosphere of the gas giant Ragnar. Ragnar was ideal because it was well protected, and Galactica could rearm after being disarmed for her decommissioning. While there, Adama found that no Colonial warships had responded to the call to regroup. Instead, the Galactica encountered a ragtag fleet of civilian vessels bearing around 50,000 survivors, including the former secretary for education and newly appointed president of the colonies, Laura Roslin.

Roslin implored Adama to abandon his plan to fight the Cylons and instead lead the survivors to safety, out of the Colonial system. Initially, Adama believed this idea to be preposterous – after all, he was a military man, bred to fight and not to run. However, after some deliberation, he agreed, realising that the survival of the human race was more important than the pursuit of vengeance in what would almost certainly be a suicidal counterattack against the Cylons; Galactica would only be one ship against an entire Cylon fleet. Galactica and her fleet jumped beyond the "red line" (the boundary beyond which FTL jump calculations become uncertain and therefore jumps become dangerous), never to return to the Twelve Colonies.

Thus, Adama found himself on the run in uncharted deep space. In order to give his men and the people of the fleet some hope, Adama lied to them, saying that he knew where the thirteenth colony, Earth, was located, and that he would lead them all there to make a new home. (Incidentally, the Hebrew word for Earth is Adama.) Even though ex-wife, Carolanne, was presumed to have died in the Cylon attack, Adama still harbored feelings for her and continued to wear his wedding band and observe their wedding anniversary for a time.

After an incident on the hangar deck that resulted in the deaths of several pilots, Adama became aware of the true details of his son Zak's death after Thrace let her affair with Zak cloud her judgment again by being too harsh on the replacement trainees. Adama was barely able to restrain himself upon learning of the cause of Zak's death from Thrace. Events following the revelation lead Adama and his surviving son Lee to commit a similar act of allowing feelings to cloud judgment after Thrace is shot down and stranded on an inhospitable planet. After Adama is compelled to abandon Thrace by President Roslin, Thrace miraculously rescues herself and returns to Galactica aboard a captured Cylon Raider. Adama forgives Thrace for her indiscretions concerning Zak. The incident also cements the father-son bond between William Adama and his surviving son. Lee questions how long his father would search for him were he missing, to which the elder Adama responds, "if it were you... we'd never leave."

Soon after Galactica and the Colonial fleet discover the lost planet Kobol, Adama is shot by "Boomer", a Cylon sleeper agent, which places him in mortal jeopardy. Although he survives this assassination attempt, the brush with death changes him somewhat: some say that his more emotional leanings are a post-traumatic reaction to the shooting, but Adama jokes to Roslin that he thinks that he is "just a wuss."

After the Battlestar Pegasus encounters the fleet, Adama comes into conflict with Rear Admiral Helena Cain, commander of the Pegasus, over the treatment of two Galactica crew members, Karl Agathon and Galen Tyrol. Cain and Adama come to the brink of firing on each other. Each battlestar commander makes plans to have the other assassinated following the successful conclusion of a joint operation to destroy the Cylon Resurrection ship. Neither plan is carried out (both commanders decide not to give the kill order), although Cain is subsequently killed by the Cylon agent Gina.

With the death of Cain, Roslin promotes Adama to admiral. Adama is surprised and touched: by this point in his career, he had given up hope of attaining flag rank; he encourages Roslin, battling breast cancer, to remain hopeful of a recovery. There was also a brief, sweet kiss between the two, initiated by Adama, which Roslin smiles at afterwards.

=== New Caprica and the Second Exodus ===
After the discovery of the planet New Caprica, Adama appears hesitant to establish a permanent settlement on the planet, but is overruled by the new president Gaius Baltar. In the months that follow, his attitude slowly softens, and he begins to allow military personnel to muster out and settle on New Caprica.

When the Cylons locate New Caprica after a year of no contact with the human race, Adama is forced reluctantly to flee with all the ships still in orbit. The fleet escapes with two thousand civilians and the Battlestars Galactica and Pegasus at half-strength. Undaunted, Adama sets about formulating a rescue plan for the humans trapped under Cylon rule. His unorthodox strategy (he even goes so far as to jump the Galactica into the atmosphere of New Caprica) is successful, but not without loss. Against his father's orders, Lee arrives in the Pegasus to join the battle and save Galactica, but left all of its fighters behind to guard the civilian fleet. Pegasus takes heavy damage, forcing the crew to abandon ship. Pegasus is destroyed upon collision with a basestar. Adama returns to the fleet as a hero. However, Galactica itself is damaged to near-crippling levels as a result of his actions and never fully recovers.

Three years after the incident at the Armistice Line, Galactica recovers Lieutenant Daniel "Bulldog" Novacek, the pilot of the recon vessel that Adama ordered shot down when in command of the Battlestar Valkyrie. Adama's guilt over the incident and suspicions that he may have provoked the Cylon attack on the Colonies lead him to tender his resignation from the Fleet: however, President Roslin refuses to accept his resignation. Moreover, in an attempt to improve fleet morale and reward Adama for his continual military service in ensuring the survival of the fleet, President Roslin awards Adama with a Medal of Distinction in recognition of his 45 years of service to the Colonial Fleet. Colonel Tigh is the one who saves Adama when Bulldog attacks the admiral, seeking revenge for his capture, and this marks a turning point in the Adama-Tigh relationship: after the award ceremony, the two friends finally sit down to share a drink and talk about the events on New Caprica, and Ellen Tigh's death in particular.

Adama is initially supportive of the "ranks dropped" boxing competition held on Galactica with Colonel Tigh as referee, seeing it as a useful means of allowing the crew to vent their frustrations and prevent them growing into feuds and grudges. However, when he sees that some of the crew have taken to enjoying the competition over tending to their professional duties, he is reminded of how he himself softened during the year above New Caprica. He takes on Chief Galen Tyrol in the ring; although he is beaten by the younger man, his actions and words afterwards remind the crew of their solemn duty to guard the civilian fleet.

After the fleet's food-processing systems become contaminated the fleet prepares to make a hazardous journey through a highly radioactive stellar cluster in search of supplies, Tigh finally returns (a little self-consciously) to the Galactica CIC. Although Adama does not join the applause for the colonel, he cannot hide a small smile. After the stellar cluster has been negotiated, he visits Captain Louanne "Kat" Katraine on her deathbed after she receives a fatal dose of radiation guiding civilian ships through the cluster. He comforts her, telling her that her shady past life is irrelevant to him: he is interested only in her bravery and outstanding qualities as a leader, for which he (posthumously) returns her to the position of CAG.

Upon reaching the Algae planet in a highly unstable planetary system the Colonials begin harvesting operations. Galen Tyrol informs Roslin and Adama of his discovery of an ancient temple, The Temple of Five which holds some significance in the Colonial religion. Roslin believes according to scripture that an artifact The Eye of Jupiter is hidden somewhere within the temple and would act as a Marker on the way to Earth. The fleet is soon confronted by four Cylon Base Stars and Adama orders all civilian ships to jump away. Taking up a defense posture Adama prepares to engage the incoming Cylons with several people still on the planet and the possibility of the Cylons retrieving information on the location of Earth. The incoming Cylons on the advice of Gaius Baltar do not come in firing instead send a delegation to negotiate with Roslin and Adama for the Eye. The brief negotiation leaves both sides in a stalemate: if the Cylons attack the Galactica or attempt to land on the planet Adama would nuke the temple, if the Colonials attempt to take the Eye the Cylons would attack. The Cylons eventually attempt to land on the planet and take the temple. Adama in response arms Galactica's nuclear warheads and targets them on the temple, nearly making good on his threat. The Cylons recall all but one of their heavy raiders forcing Adama to back down. When the star in the planetary system begins to show sign of going supernova and the Cylon fleet jumps away, Adama orders a rescue mission be launched to the planet. Retrieving all of her raptors, Galactica narrowly escapes the shock wave jumping back to her fleet.

Following Gaius Baltar's apprehension in the temple, a tribunal of five ship captains is formed to serve as judges in Baltar's trial for treason and crimes against the human race. Adama is appointed to this panel, though Captain Franks of the civilian ship Prometheus is selected to chair it. Despite President Roslin's requests to Maj. Lee Adama that he assist in preparing the prosecution's case against Baltar, and despite Admiral Adama bestowing his father Joseph Adama's law textbooks to Lee due to his flirtatious interest in law when he was a youth, Lee declines because he has doubts about the fairness of the trial. The admiral instead relieves Lee of his CAG duties to provide security detail for Baltar and his attorney, Romo Lampkin, who was a student of William's father and Lee's grandfather. After Lampkin survives two failed assassination attempts, Admiral Adama decides to reinstate Lee to his CAG duties. Lee, however, tells the admiral that he wishes to assist Lampkin in the defense of Baltar, incensing his father. After Lampkin humiliates Tigh on the witness stand by forcing him to admit that he killed his own wife, an argument ensues between the two Adamas, resulting in animosity between father and son, Lee resigning his commission in anger of having his integrity questioned by his father, and Adama retorting that he wants no officer without integrity serving under him. Adama unsuccessfully attempts to circumvent Lee's cross-examination of the cancer-stricken Laura Roslin, and Captain Franks pressures her into admitting that she is once again taking the hallucinogenic chamalla extract, effectively discrediting her as a witness. Roslin depressed, the senior Adama comforts and encourages her in preparation for her doloxan treatments. As the trial continues, and Baltar's case appears to be crumbling, Baltar demands that Lee Adama take the stand. When Lampkin asks Lee if Baltar deserves a fair trial, Lee replies that he does, and that he was not guilty of treason. He goes on to ask the tribunal what they would have done in Baltar's position, and remarks that everyone else on New Caprica was pardoned for whatever transgressions they made, but Baltar was made the scapegoat. He looks at his father, and continues, saying that the entire case was based on emotions, and that new laws need to be made to preserve their civilization, and to prevent humanity from turning into a gang. Lee's testimony results in both Baltar's acquittal by way of Adama's "not guilty" swing vote, and winning back his father's respect.

=== Cylon Civil War and Discovering Earth ===
Following the failed rebellion of the Twos, Sixes and Eights and Cavil's swift reprisal only one rebel Basestar remained although heavily damaged, the Leoben model Two Cylon took a Heavy Raider to find Kara Thrace believing that she could lead both humans and Cylons to their destiny. Adama had sent Kara and several of Galactica's pilots and crew aboard a freighter to retrace her unexplainable journey to Earth when Leoben encountered them and brought them an offer of peace with the rebels and help to find Earth. They brought the Basestar and the rebels back to the fleet and formed the joint strike force plan to destroy the Resurrection Hub (which would prevent Cylons from downloading into new bodies upon their death) while simultaneously retrieving D'Anna, a Three who knew the identities of the Final Five Cylons who could help lead them to Earth. Roslin and Adama agreed that this was an opportunity they couldn't waste and in the process of transferring military forces on board the Basestar for a sneak attack the malfunctioning Hybrid made an FTL jump into the battle zone with Roslin, Baltar, Helo and a good number of Galactica's Viper and Raptor complement with them. After a lengthy search of the post battle debris it becomes apparent that while the fleet is ready to move on believing that the Basestar is lost along with Roslin which is something that Adama cannot accept. He gives his orders to Tigh and Lee before boarding a Raptor with the intention to wait for the Basestar's return because he has come to realize that he cannot live without her.

After some time waiting in the Raptor with only the book he was reading to Roslin during her treatments for entertainment his persistence was rewarded when the Basestar reappeared in front of him. After landing on board he is greeted by Roslin who has come to the same realization about their relationship telling him that she loves him which Adama replies "it's about time" after which they embrace. Upon returning to the fleet the deceptive ploys by both sides lead to the Cylons holding Roslin and the remaining Colonial military hostage while Adama is instructed to allow the Final Five return to the Basestar or D'Anna will begin to execute the prisoners. Tory Foster's defection leaves Colonel Tigh no other option but to reveal himself to his best friend that he is a Cylon and that Adama must threaten to kill him in order to save the hostages. Upon learning of this Adama returns to his quarters and furiously drinks while trashing his room, Lee finds him in tears slumped next to the head inconsolable. Tory calls Galactica's bluff and prepares to execute Roslin leaving Tigh no other option but to out the remaining two Cylons Chief Tyrol and Sam Anders who have been working frantically with Kara to decipher the location of Earth. At the last moment before the execution can take place she enters the airlock exclaiming she knows how to find Earth, a wireless distress signal from a Colonial frequency. A truce is called between the two ships and they follow the signal to a blue planet with matching constellations from the Temple of Athena where President Roslin and Admiral Adama lead a survey team down to the planet they have been searching for to call home.

As Adama picks up the first handful of Earth as he said he would in his speech before departing Galactica a survey team member waves a Geiger counter over it to reveal high background radiation, it is then revealed that there are many survey teams made up of both humans and Cylons walking around a ravaged world that is more than obviously dead and uninhabitable. Adama and Roslin return to Galactica amidst a horde of hopeful people waiting for a confirmation that everything they have suffered through and lost has been rewarded, barely holding back her tears is unable to speak a word to the crowd demanding any information as Adama and a squad of marines escort her to safety. As he walks the halls of the ship Adama sees countless people crying, fighting, consoling and just plain giving up all over the ship as word has spread that Earth is a dead rock, he feels the same but cannot let it show even when he is in his quarters as Roslin is staying there and has taken a deep turn into depression after her messianic role has been a lie. Finally breaking down with the assistance of several drinks he confronts Tigh and attempts to goad him into ending his suffering with a handgun, luckily both men regain their composure and reflect on the past and the XO reminds his superior what the commander of the fleet is required to do. Adama sobers up and heads to a somber and somewhat sparse CIC and orders recon missions for habitable systems for the fleet to hopefully settle and extends this offer to the rebel Cylons should they wish it and orders the return of all personnel from the planet before they make the next jump.

As the fleet continues on its new mission to find any place to call home things have become somewhat normalized, Adama proceeds through a normal routine trying to keep things professional but with little luck as he makes it to CIC. As the day progresses he holds a meeting with the senior staff regarding FTL upgrades using Cylon tech and the negative reaction that most people will have toward accepting help from their perceived enemy especially from Felix Gaeta, something he echoes throughout the ship over the course of the day and sows discontent among many other crewmembers. Upon hearing reports that Roslin has been jogging around the ship Adama confronts her on missing her treatment appointments in sickbay, not taking her medication and overall abandonment of the office of the presidency. She merely states that with what time she has left she doesn't want to spend it giving people hope, false or real, and after everything she has done to get them there she deserves to live a little, a sentiment he shares, she also tells him he deserves the same as she kisses him then leaves. His day reaches an apex when Tom Zarek has stirred up so much discord within the fleet over the Cylon upgrades that the tylium refinery ship jumps to an unknown location, a location Zarek gives up too easily as Adama bluffs him with a fake surveillance dossier. It is later revealed that this was Zarek's intention all along to have the fleet see Galactica and the Presidency using excessive force to get their way. After the ship is returned to the fleet Adama is informed over the comm in his quarters of the situation which reveals that he is in fact in bed next to a wigless Roslin who expresses he complete lack of concern for the fleet as her and Adama share an intimate laugh as they live in the moment for themselves alone for once.

=== Mutiny ===
After Adama starts considering not only an alliance with the Rebel Cylons but allowing them to join the fleet, Lieutenant Felix Gaeta starts a mutiny against him with Tom Zarek starting a coup against Roslin and the rest of the government. They capture Adama and try him for various crimes including treason, dereliction of duty (for abandoning the people on New Caprica) and aiding and abetting the enemy. Despite initially being captured, Adama escapes and helps Roslin, who he has started a romantic relationship with and Baltar escape to the rebel basestar before he and Tigh are recaptured. Adama is eventually sentenced to death by firing squad, but is rescued by the now-civilian Lee and loyal officers, including a former mutineer. Adama is able to turn his own executioners back to his side and leads an ever-increasing group of loyalists to CIC which he retakes without firing a shot, capturing Gaeta and Zarek and ending the mutiny. Retaking command of his ship, Adama contacts Roslin on the basestar who has been demanding the mutineers surrender and threatening their destruction and informs the relieved Roslin, Baltar and rebel Cylons that Galactica is back under his control. His survival (the group on the basestar had been informed he was dead) drives Roslin and an Eight Cylon to tears. When an emotional Roslin returns to Galactica he greets her personally and then at an unknown later point, has Gaeta and Zarek executed by a firing squad he personally commands for their crimes. True to his word, he doesn't grant any of the mutineers clemency and has them imprisoned on the Astral Queen (though he eventually allows anyone willing to join the later attack on The colony their freedom) though he may have relented a little in Gaeta's case as Gaeta was allowed a visit by Baltar, drank what seemed to be Adama's morning coffee (the "spoils of war") during the meeting, seemed to be imprisoned in his quarters rather than the brig and was allowed to die in his uniform, something Adama swore the mutineers would be denied.

=== Rescue of Hera and finding a new home ===
Adama eventually commands the Galactica on her final mission: an operation to rescue the half-human, half-cylon child Hera from the Cylon colony. The mission is successful, and Galactica jumps to the planet that will eventually be known as Earth, but sustains irreparable damage in the process.

After surveying the primitive human natives, Adama adopts a colonizing strategy proposed by his son Lee: the colonials abandon most of their technology and settle in widely separated locations on the planet. The emptied ships of the fleet, including Galactica, are piloted into the sun. As he had planned earlier, William Adama is the last person to leave Galactica, launching aboard the Mk. II Viper with his call sign, "Husker" that had appeared in the original mini-series.

Adama takes the dying Laura Roslin on a Raptor flight over their new homeworld, searching for a spot to build the cabin they had talked about on New Caprica. Roslin dies during the flight, as foretold by the prophecy, and Adama places his wedding ring on her finger. In his final scene in the series, Adama is depicted sitting next to Roslin's grave, describing the progress he has made in building their cabin.

== Personality and relationships ==
A weary, battle-hardened man in late middle age, Adama demonstrated a powerful strength of character throughout the series, successfully leading and protecting what remained of humanity against the Cylon threat. Despite the greater age of his Battlestar compared to some of the other ships in the fleet at the time of the attack, Adama led the ship to victory against various Cylon threats, successfully coming up with strategies to defeat Cylon opponents despite their significantly superior numerical and technological advantage. His dedication to his ship earned him the loyalty of many, with Tigh once stating when Adama was injured that, as far as he was concerned, Galactica was Adama's ship until his death. A significant number of the crew participated in a mutiny led by Felix Gaeta, but Ronald D. Moore stated in the episode podcasts that the mutineers never had enough people to take complete control of the ship. A large number of the crew are seen joining Adama when he retook the ship, and several of the mutineers, including Aaron Kelly and several marines, switched sides during the battle.

Adama's hobbies include building model sailing ships by hand. "Here Be Dragons", the penultimate episode of the prequel Caprica, shows that he inherited this from his mother Evelyn.

In terms of his personal relationships, Adama's life was complicated at best. Although he tried to maintain a professional distance from his crew to prevent his emotions from clouding his judgement, he was nevertheless strongly devoted to them. For all the arguments between him and his son Lee Adama, he had more than once stated that he would never abandon Lee whatever his son did, attempting to reconcile with Lee even after Lee served as the defense counsel for Gaius Baltar during his trial. His affection for his ex-wife is also evident, setting aside the day of their anniversary each year to remember her despite how their relationship ended.

He was also well known for forming more than one father/daughter bond with members of the military under his command, particularly Kara 'Starbuck' Thrace, Anastasia 'Dee' Dualla and Louanne 'Kat' Katraine, telling Kat once that he and his wife would have liked to have a daughter as well as their sons, stating that "Three's a good round number". Similarly, when Kara Thrace voiced her anxieties about her own identity when she returned from the dead, Adama reassured her by proclaiming "You're my daughter". Evidence of his relationship with Dee was when he called her into his office so he could voice his frustrations with the fact that President Roslin stood against him and Lee having sided with her on the matter believing she had nothing to say. Though Dee proved him wrong in this regard. Despite his vocal dislike of Cylons, Adama even managed to form a father/daughter bond with the second Cylon Number Eight copy he encountered, Sharon 'Athena' Agathon, growing to trust her despite the fact that her 'predecessor' shot him. Prior to her shooting him and discovering she was a cylon, Adama had a similar relationship with the first Number Eight copy he knew, Sharon 'Boomer' Valerii. He even stated that he loved her, that she meant a lot him and that she was more than a machine to him, that she was a vital living person. It was in part because of his relationship with Boomer that motivated Adama to become attached to Athena and bond with her.

Adama also retained his strong friendship with Saul Tigh even after the latter is discovered to be a cylon. His relationship with President Laura Roslin has been particularly turbulent; although they have often disagreed over crucial decisions, such as when Roslin convinced Starbuck to return to Caprica to retrieve the Arrow of Apollo, or when she convinced the Agathons that their daughter Hera – the first human/Cylon hybrid – had died during the birth, they have also demonstrated a great affection for each other, Adama admitting after she was briefly captured by the Cylons that he cannot live without her. In Season Four, it is shown that they developed an intimate romantic relationship. After her death, he placed his wedding ring on her finger and buried her outside the cabin he planned to build and live in solitude.

== Preparing for the role ==
Actor Edward James Olmos has brown eyes, but when playing William Adama he wore contact lenses that make Adama's eyes blue. This was done so that Olmos and actor Jamie Bamber, who played his son Lee, would resemble each other more. Reciprocally, Bamber dyed his hair darker to better match Olmos's coloring.
