= Ring of Fire Studios =

American digital effects company

- Company type: Limited Liability Company
- Industry: Visual Effects, CGI animation
- Founded: 1996
- Headquarters: Venice, California, United States
- Key people: John Myers, Jerry Spivack
- Website: www.ringoffire.com

Ring of Fire Studios is a digital effects and design company located in Venice, California. Launched in 1996, the company focuses on commercial advertising work but also does visual effects, animation and pre-visualization for features, television, music videos and live events.

Nike, GEICO, Adidas, T-Mobile, UPS, Mercedes and Bud Light are among their advertising clients, and some of the agencies they work with are Wieden + Kennedy, The Martin Agency, TBWA\Chiat\Day, Ogilvy + Mather, Goodby Silverstein & Partners and BBDO Worldwide.

Ring of Fire has done feature film work for Warner Bros., Fox and Paramount. They worked on the 2008 release The Bucket List directed by Rob Reiner and on Gigantic, an independent feature directed by Matt Aselton, one of the top comedy commercial directors in advertising, and the movie stars Paul Dano, John Goodman, and Zooey Deschanel.

Ring of Fire partners and owners, Creative Director Jerry Spivack and Executive Producer John Myers, lead the company, overseeing a staff of visual effects artists, animators, supervisors and producers.

== Ring of Fire selected filmography ==
- Gigantic (2008)
- The Bucket List (2008)
- Sky Captain and the World of Tomorrow (2004)
- Spider-Man 2 (2004)
- The Day After Tomorrow (2004)
- Alex & Emma (2003)
- Highwaymen (2003)

== External links and sources ==
- Official website
