= List of Battlestar Galactica (2004 TV series) episodes =

Battlestar Galactica is an American military science fiction television series, and part of the Battlestar Galactica franchise. The show was developed by Ronald D. Moore as a re-imagining of the 1978 Battlestar Galactica television series created by Glen A. Larson. The series first aired as a three-hour miniseries (comprising four broadcast hours) in December 2003 on the Sci-Fi Channel. The television series debuted in the United Kingdom on Sky1 on October 18, 2004, and premiered in the United States on the Sci-Fi Channel on January 14, 2005.

The story arc of Battlestar Galactica is set in a distant star system, where a civilization of humans live on a series of planets known as the Twelve Colonies of Kobol. In the past, the Colonies had been at war with a cybernetic race of their own creation, known as the Cylons. With the self-serving and venal help of a human named Gaius Baltar, the Cylons, some now in human form, launch a sudden sneak attack on the Colonies, laying waste to the planets and devastating their populations. Out of a population numbering in the billions, only approximately 50,000 humans survive, most of whom were aboard civilian spaceships that avoided destruction. Of all the Colonial Fleet, the eponymous battlestar Galactica appears to be the only military capital ship that survived the attack. Under the leadership of Colonial Fleet officer Commander William "Bill" Adama and President Laura Roslin, Galactica and its crew take up the task of leading the small fugitive fleet of survivors into space in search of a fabled refuge known as Earth.

== Series overview ==
Season	Episodes	Originally released		
Season	Episodes	First released	Last released	Network
Miniseries	2	December 8, 2003	December 9, 2003	Sci-Fi Channel
1	13	October 18, 2004 (Note: Air date on Sky1; season 1 was broadcast on the Sci-Fi Channel three months later.)	January 24, 2005	Sci-Fi Channel / Sky1
2	20	July 15, 2005	September 23, 2005	Sci-Fi Channel
2	20	January 6, 2006	March 10, 2006	Sci-Fi Channel
3	20	October 6, 2006	March 25, 2007	Sci-Fi Channel
Razor		November 24, 2007		Sci-Fi Channel
4	21	April 4, 2008	June 13, 2008	Sci-Fi Channel
4	21	January 16, 2009	March 20, 2009	Sci-Fi Channel
The Plan		October 27, 2009 (Note: DVD release date; the film was broadcast on the Sci-Fi Channel on January 10, 2010.)		Sci-Fi Channel

== Episodes ==
=== Miniseries (2003) ===
Title	Survivor count	Directed by	Written by	Original release date
"Part/Night 1"	Unspecified	Michael Rymer	Ronald D. Moore and Christopher Eric James	December 8, 2003
Secretary of Education Laura Roslin visits the Battlestar Galactica for its decommissioning ceremony. The Cylons launch a surprise nuclear-attack on the Twelve Colonies of Kobol, ending a 40-year armistice between the Cylons and humans; most of the human population is wiped out, and the majority of the human fleet is destroyed due to malware implanted by the Cylons. Galactica survives, and its commander, William Adama, assumes command of the human fleet. Roslin aboard a Colonial passenger ship survives as well, and is sworn in as the President of the Twelve Colonies after most of the government have been killed. Roslin orders to start rescuing civilian ships, while Adama, on the contrary, orders all ships to regroup at Ragnar Station for counterattack-preparations. A shuttle from Galactica, crewed by Sharon "Boomer" Valerii and Karl "Helo" Agathon, lands briefly on the human capital-world of Caprica after escaping the fight with the Cylons; Helo switches places with Gaius Baltar, a renowned human scientist who unknowingly helped the Cylons gain access into the human military-computers; Boomer, Baltar and a few more survivors leave Caprica, while Helo is left behind. As the Cylons attack Colonial One, the ship appears to be destroyed by a nuclear explosion.
"Part/Night 2"	50,298	Michael Rymer	Ronald D. Moore and Christopher Eric James	December 9, 2003
Adama orders Galactica to jump to Ragnar Station using faster-than-light (FTL) technology; aboard, they find a man named Leoben, who is revealed to be a humanoid Cylon model, and is killed by Adama. Colonial One is revealed to be intact; Adama's son Lee had used EMP generators on board to simulate the ship's destruction and engineer its escape from the Cylons. Boomer and Baltar reach Colonial One. The Cylons discover Roslin's grown fleet of civilian ships; she orders all FTL-equipped ships to jump to Ragnar, abandoning the rest. Roslin's fleet joins Galactica. Baltar is haunted by a virtual image of the female humanoid Cylon model, "Number Six." He fabricates evidence against another civilian, Aaron Doral, thinking he is another Cylon model; Doral is arrested. Roslin convinces Adama to stop counterattack preparations, and instead focus on humanity's survival. Galactica and the civilian fleet leave the star system after the battle with the Cylons, leaving Doral on Ragnar. Adama promises the crew to take them to the scriptural planet known as "Earth." Doral is confirmed to be a Cylon, as multiple copies of him, Six, and Leoben meet on Ragnar; another Cylon model is revealed to look exactly like Boomer.

=== Season 1 (2004–05) ===
No. overall	No. in season	Title	Survivor count	Directed by	Written by	Original release date
1	1	"33"	49,998	Michael Rymer	Ronald D. Moore	October 18, 2004 (Sky1); January 14, 2005 (Sci Fi)
2	2	"Water"	47,973	Marita Grabiak	Ronald D. Moore	October 25, 2004 (Sky1); January 14, 2005 (Sci Fi)
3	3	"Bastille Day"	47,958	Allan Kroeker	Toni Graphia	November 1, 2004 (Sky1); January 21, 2005 (Sci Fi)
4	4	"Act of Contrition"	47,958	Rod Hardy	Bradley Thompson & David Weddle	November 8, 2004 (Sky1); January 28, 2005 (Sci Fi)
5	5	"You Can't Go Home Again"	47,945	Sergio Mimica-Gezzan	Carla Robinson	November 15, 2004 (Sky1); February 4, 2005 (Sci Fi)
6	6	"Litmus"	47,945	Rod Hardy	Jeff Vlaming	November 22, 2004 (Sky1); February 11, 2005 (Sci Fi)
7	7	"Six Degrees of Separation"	47,942	Robert Young	Michael Angeli	November 29, 2004 (Sky1); February 18, 2005 (Sci Fi)
8	8	"Flesh and Bone"	47,938	Brad Turner	Toni Graphia	December 6, 2004 (Sky1); February 25, 2005 (Sci Fi)
9	9	"Tigh Me Up, Tigh Me Down"	47,905	Edward James Olmos	Jeff Vlaming	December 13, 2004 (Sky1); March 4, 2005 (Sci Fi)
10	10	"The Hand of God"	47,905	Jeff Woolnough	Bradley Thompson & David Weddle	January 3, 2005 (Sky1); March 11, 2005 (Sci Fi)
11	11	"Colonial Day"	47,898	Jonas Pate	Carla Robinson	January 10, 2005 (Sky1); March 18, 2005 (Sci Fi)
12	12	"Kobol's Last Gleaming (Part 1)"	47,897	Michael Rymer	Story by : David Eick; Teleplay by : Ronald D. Moore	January 17, 2005 (Sky1); March 25, 2005 (Sci Fi)
13	13	"Kobol's Last Gleaming (Part 2)"	47,887	Michael Rymer	Story by : David Eick; Teleplay by : Ronald D. Moore	January 24, 2005 (Sky1); April 1, 2005 (Sci Fi)

=== Season 2 (2005–06) ===
No. overall	No. in season	Title	Survivor count	Directed by	Written by	Original release date
Season 2.0
14	1	"Scattered"	47,875	Michael Rymer	David Weddle & Bradley Thompson	July 15, 2005
15	2	"Valley of Darkness"	47,874	Michael Rymer	David Weddle & Bradley Thompson	July 22, 2005
16	3	"Fragged"	47,862	Sergio Mimica-Gezzan	Dawn Prestwich & Nicole Yorkin	July 29, 2005
17	4	"Resistance"	47,861	Allan Kroeker	Toni Graphia	August 5, 2005
18	5	"The Farm"	47,857	Rod Hardy	Carla Robinson	August 12, 2005
19	6	"Home (Part 1)"	47,858	Sergio Mimica-Gezzan	David Eick	August 19, 2005
20	7	"Home (Part 2)"	47,855	Jeff Woolnough	David Eick & Ronald D. Moore	August 26, 2005
21	8	"Final Cut"	47,853	Robert Young	Mark Verheiden	September 9, 2005
22	9	"Flight of the Phoenix"	47,853	Michael Nankin	David Weddle & Bradley Thompson	September 16, 2005
23	10	"Pegasus"	49,605	Michael Rymer	Anne Cofell Saunders	September 23, 2005
Season 2.5
24	11	"Resurrection Ship (Part 1)"	49,604	Michael Rymer	Story by : Anne Cofell Saunders; Teleplay by : Michael Rymer	January 6, 2006
25	12	"Resurrection Ship (Part 2)"	49,604	Michael Rymer	Michael Rymer & Ronald D. Moore	January 13, 2006
26	13	"Epiphanies"	49,598	Rod Hardy	Joel Anderson Thompson	January 20, 2006
27	14	"Black Market"	49,597	James Head	Mark Verheiden	January 27, 2006
28	15	"Scar"	49,593	Michael Nankin	David Weddle & Bradley Thompson	February 3, 2006
29	16	"Sacrifice"	49,590	Rey Villalobos	Anne Cofell Saunders	February 10, 2006
30	17	"The Captain's Hand"	49,584	Sergio Mimica-Gezzan	Jeff Vlaming	February 17, 2006
31	18	"Downloaded"	49,579	Jeff Woolnough	Bradley Thompson & David Weddle	February 24, 2006
32	19	"Lay Down Your Burdens (Part 1)"	49,579	Michael Rymer	Ronald D. Moore	March 3, 2006
33	20	"Lay Down Your Burdens (Part 2)"	49,550	Michael Rymer	Anne Cofell Saunders & Mark Verheiden	March 10, 2006

=== Season 3 (2006–07) ===
No. overall	No. in season	Title	Survivor count	Directed by	Written by	Original release date
34	1	"Occupation"	Unspecified	Sergio Mimica-Gezzan	Ronald D. Moore	October 6, 2006
35	2	"Precipice"	Unspecified	Sergio Mimica-Gezzan	Ronald D. Moore	October 6, 2006
36	3	"Exodus (Part 1)"	Unspecified	Félix Enríquez Alcalá	Bradley Thompson & David Weddle	October 13, 2006
37	4	"Exodus (Part 2)"	Unspecified	Félix Enríquez Alcalá	Bradley Thompson & David Weddle	October 20, 2006
38	5	"Collaborators"	41,435	Michael Rymer	Mark Verheiden	October 27, 2006
39	6	"Torn"	41,422	Jean de Segonzac	Anne Cofell Saunders	November 3, 2006
40	7	"A Measure of Salvation"	41,420	Bill Eagles	Michael Angeli	November 10, 2006
41	8	"Hero"	41,421	Michael Rymer	David Eick	November 17, 2006
42	9	"Unfinished Business"	41,422	Robert Young	Michael Taylor	December 1, 2006
43	10	"The Passage"	41,420	Michael Nankin	Jane Espenson	December 8, 2006
44	11	"The Eye of Jupiter"	41,402	Michael Rymer	Mark Verheiden	December 15, 2006
45	12	"Rapture"	41,401	Michael Rymer	Bradley Thompson & David Weddle	January 21, 2007
46	13	"Taking a Break from All Your Worries"	41,403	Edward James Olmos	Michael Taylor	January 28, 2007
47	14	"The Woman King"	41,401	Michael Rymer	Michael Angeli	February 11, 2007
48	15	"A Day in the Life"	41,398	Rod Hardy	Mark Verheiden	February 18, 2007
49	16	"Dirty Hands"	41,400	Wayne Rose	Jane Espenson & Anne Cofell Saunders	February 25, 2007
50	17	"Maelstrom"	41,400	Michael Nankin	Bradley Thompson & David Weddle	March 4, 2007
51	18	"The Son Also Rises"	41,399	Robert Young	Michael Angeli	March 11, 2007
52	19	"Crossroads (Part 1)"	Unspecified	Michael Rymer	Michael Taylor	March 18, 2007
53	20	"Crossroads (Part 2)"	Unspecified	Michael Rymer	Mark Verheiden	March 25, 2007

=== Razor (2007) ===
No.	Title	Survivor count	Directed by	Written by	Original release date	U.S. viewers (millions)
54	Razor	49,579	Félix Enríquez Alcalá	Michael Taylor	November 24, 2007	1.72
55	Razor	49,579	Félix Enríquez Alcalá	Michael Taylor	November 24, 2007	1.72
A television film (in a TV and an extended version) and a series of seven flashback webisodes (1st, 2nd and 7th not included in the film itself). Chronologically, this fits into season 2 between the episodes "The Captain's Hand" and "Downloaded" while setting up season 4 (characters and events wise). The film reveals the chronicles of the Battlestar Pegasus and its crew from the initial Cylon attack on the Twelve Colonies, up to its meeting with Galactica, while Apollo's new XO deals with the harsh reality of Admiral Cain's legacy.

=== Season 4 (2008–09) ===
No. overall	No. in season	Title	Survivor count	Directed by	Written by	Original release date	U.S. viewers (millions)
Season 4.0
56	1	"He That Believeth in Me"	39,698	Michael Rymer	Bradley Thompson & David Weddle	April 4, 2008	2.14
57	2	"Six of One"	39,676	Anthony Hemingway	Michael Angeli	April 11, 2008	1.80
58	3	"The Ties That Bind"	39,676	Michael Nankin	Michael Taylor	April 18, 2008	1.74
59	4	"Escape Velocity"	39,675	Edward James Olmos	Jane Espenson	April 25, 2008	N/A
60	5	"The Road Less Traveled"	39,676	Michael Rymer	Mark Verheiden	May 2, 2008	N/A
61	6	"Faith"	39,675	Michael Nankin	Seamus Kevin Fahey	May 9, 2008	N/A
62	7	"Guess What's Coming to Dinner?"	39,673	Wayne Rose	Michael Angeli	May 16, 2008	N/A
63	8	"Sine Qua Non"	39,674	Rod Hardy	Michael Taylor	May 27, 2008	N/A
64	9	"The Hub"	39,673	Paul Edwards	Jane Espenson	June 6, 2008	N/A
65	10	"Revelations"	39,665	Michael Rymer	Bradley Thompson & David Weddle	June 13, 2008	1.80
Season 4.5
66	11	"Sometimes a Great Notion"	39,651	Michael Nankin	Bradley Thompson & David Weddle	January 16, 2009	2.11
67	12	"A Disquiet Follows My Soul"	39,644	Ronald D. Moore	Ronald D. Moore	January 23, 2009	1.72
68	13	"The Oath"	39,643	John Dahl	Mark Verheiden	January 30, 2009	1.56
69	14	"Blood on the Scales"	39,603	Wayne Rose	Michael Angeli	February 6, 2009	1.77
70	15	"No Exit"	39,556	Gwyneth Horder-Payton	Ryan Mottesheard	February 13, 2009	1.74
71	16	"Deadlock"	39,556	Robert Young	Jane Espenson	February 20, 2009	1.53
72	17	"Someone to Watch Over Me"	39,556	Michael Nankin	Bradley Thompson & David Weddle	February 27, 2009	1.66
73	18	"Islanded in a Stream of Stars"	39,521	Edward James Olmos	Michael Taylor	March 6, 2009	1.57
74	19	"Daybreak (Part 1)"	39,516	Michael Rymer	Ronald D. Moore	March 13, 2009	1.66
75	20	"Daybreak (Part 2)"	39,406	Michael Rymer	Ronald D. Moore	March 20, 2009	2.36
76	21	"Daybreak (Part 3)"	39,406	Michael Rymer	Ronald D. Moore	March 20, 2009	2.36

=== The Plan (2009) ===
Title	Survivor count	Directed by	Written by	Original release date
The Plan	Unspecified	Edward James Olmos	Jane Espenson	October 27, 2009 (Blu-ray/DVD); January 10, 2010 (TV)
The film provides an alternate perspective on many events already known to the viewer. Chronologically, this takes place throughout seasons 1 and 2 only (and the miniseries), but contains plot revelations of the entire series. As two John Cavil Cylons wait to be blown out of a Galactica airlock, they discuss their opposing opinions on the plan to annihilate humankind. They reflect on their own experiences with the humans since the attack on the Twelve Colonies, their roles in the orchestration of the Cylon agents onboard the Galactica, and efforts to sabotage the resistance effort on Caprica come to light.

== Webisodes (2006–09) ==
Title	Survivor count	Directed by	Written by	No. of Installments	Original release
The Resistance	Unspecified	Wayne Rose	Bradley Thompson & David Weddle	10	September 5, 2006 – October 5, 2006
Ten mini episodes taking place between the season 2 finale and the season 3 premiere. The Cylons' occupation of New Caprica results in the formation of a human resistance movement determined to undermine the Cylons' attempt to assimilate the remainder of humanity.
Razor Flashbacks	Unspecified	Wayne Rose & Félix Enríquez Alcalá	Michael Taylor	7	October 5, 2007 – November 16, 2007
Seven mini flashback episodes tied to the 2007 television film Razor. During the later stages of the First Cylon War, a young Lt. William Adama discovers, by chance, an abandoned lab where the Cylons conducted gruesome experiments with live human subjects.
The Face of the Enemy	Unspecified	Wayne Rose	Jane Espenson & Seamus Kevin Fahey	10	December 12, 2008 – January 12, 2009
Ten mini episodes taking place between the season 4 episodes "Sometimes a Great Notion" and "A Disquiet Follows My Soul". Nine days after finding Earth, Lt. Gaeta is onboard a Raptor with several of Galactica's crew and Cylon Eights en route to the Zephyr when a Cylon threat forces the fleet to jump. During the chaos, the Raptor is separated from rest of the fleet and while waiting for a rescue, the passengers and crew mysteriously begin to die off one by one.

== Home media ==
Product	Episodes	DVD release date			Blu-ray Disc release date
Product	Episodes	Region 1	Region 2	Region 4	Blu-ray Disc release date
Miniseries (2003)	2	December 28, 2004	March 1, 2004	April 16, 2004	—N/a
Season 1 (2004–05)	13	September 20, 2005	March 28, 2005	August 15, 2006	January 5, 2010^{1}
Season 2 (2005–06)	20	Season 2.0: December 20, 2005	August 28, 2006	April 4, 2007	April 6, 2010
Season 2 (2005–06)	20	Season 2.5: September 19, 2006	August 28, 2006	April 4, 2007	April 6, 2010
Season 3 (2006–07)	20	March 18, 2008	September 3, 2007	November 20, 2007	July 27, 2010
Razor^{2} (2007)	Film	December 4, 2007	December 26, 2007	August 20, 2008	December 28, 2010
Season 4 (2008–09)	20	Season 4.0: January 6, 2009	Season 4: October 6, 2008	Season 4: Part 1: December 3, 2008	January 4, 2011
Season 4 (2008–09)	20	Season 4.5: July 28, 2009	The Final Season: June 1, 2009	Season 4: Part 2: July 28, 2009	January 4, 2011
The Plan (2009)	Film	October 27, 2009	May 10, 2010	December 7, 2009	October 27, 2009
Other releases
Miniseries & Seasons 1–3	55	—N/a	October 22, 2007	December 4, 2007	—N/a
Miniseries & Seasons 1–4^{3}	65 & Film	—N/a	October 6, 2008	—N/a	—N/a
The Complete Series^{4}	75 & Film	July 28, 2009	September 21, 2009	—N/a	July 28, 2009
The Complete Collection^{5}	75 & 2 Films	—N/a	—N/a	December 7, 2009	—N/a
The Complete Series	75 & 2 Films	April 6, 2010	—N/a	March 8, 2010	April 6, 2010
The Ultimate Wholeness (L'Intégrale ultime)^{6}	75 & 3 Films	—N/a	—N/a	—N/a	October 6, 2015

Notes:

1. In addition to the Blu-ray Disc releases, this set was also released on HD DVD, on December 4, 2007.
2. Razor, though being a television movie, is considered to be the first two episodes of season 4, hence the fourth season is technically 22 episodes and runs from 2007 to 2009.
3. This set does not contain the second half of Season 4, also known as The Final Season.
4. This set does not contain The Plan.
5. This set also contains the complete 1978 Battlestar Galactica series, including Galactica 1980.
6. This set also contains Battlestar Galactica: Blood & Chrome, the complete Caprica series, the complete 1978 Battlestar Galactica series, the complete Galactica 1980 series, and the 1978 feature film based on the original series pilot episode. This set has been released in European French speaking countries only.

== Broadcast ratings ==
Season	Number of episodes	Premiere		Finale		Average viewership (millions)
Season	Number of episodes	Date	Viewers (millions)	Date	Viewers (millions)	Average viewership (millions)
4	22	April 4, 2008	2.1	March 20, 2009	2.4	2.3

== Online availability ==
In January 2006, Apple began offering the episodes for the miniseries, season 1, and season 2 for purchase on the U.S. version of the iTunes Store. In December 2007, the Battlestar Galactica episodes were removed from iTunes, along with other NBC Universal content. In September 2008, the episodes returned to iTunes when NBC Universal announced their return to iTunes. In February 2009, the series became available in high-definition format at the UK iTunes Store.

The series has also been available via Peacock, Amazon Video, Google Play, Hulu, Netflix, PlayStation Network, and Microsoft Movies & TV.

In September 2020, the series was made available on the BBC iPlayer. On May 1, 2026, the entire series–including the miniseries and the television film The Plan– were added to Paramount+ and Pluto TV.
