= Battlestar Galactica season 1 =

Battlestar Galactica
- Season 1
- Season One DVD cover
- No. of episodes: 13

Release
- Original network: Sci Fi (US); Sky1 (UK)
- Original release: October 18, 2004 – January 24, 2005 (UK)

Season chronology
- ← Previous; The Miniseries Next → Season 2

The first season of the reimagined science fiction television series Battlestar Galactica, was commissioned by Sci Fi in February 2004. The first episode, "33", was first broadcast in the United Kingdom on October 18, 2004, on Sky1, three months before its premiere in the United States on January 14, 2005 on Sci Fi. Sky1 had negotiated first-broadcast rights of season 1 as part of its financial backing terms. The first episode of the series received a Hugo Award and the season's 13 episodes were recognized with a Peabody Award "for pushing the limits of science fiction and making it accessible to all."

The first season is a follow-up to the miniseries that first aired in December 2003.

== Cast and characters ==
=== Main cast ===
These actors are credited during the opening sequence:

- Edward James Olmos as William Adama
- Mary McDonnell as Laura Roslin
- Katee Sackhoff as Kara "Starbuck" Thrace
- Jamie Bamber as Lee "Apollo" Adama
- James Callis as Gaius Baltar
- Tricia Helfer as Number Six
- Grace Park as Sharon "Boomer" Valerii (Number Eight)

These actors are credited after the opening sequence:

- Michael Hogan as Saul Tigh
- Aaron Douglas as Galen Tyrol
- Tahmoh Penikett as Karl "Helo" Agathon
- Kandyse McClure as Anastasia Dualla
- Paul Campbell as Billy Keikeya
- Alessandro Juliani as Felix Gaeta
- Sam Witwer as Alex "Crashdown" Quartararo
- Connor Widdows as Boxey (only episode 3)

=== Recurring ===
- Richard Hatch as Tom Zarek
- Lorena Gale as Priestess Elosha
- Donnelly Rhodes as Sherman Cottle
- Jill Teed as Sergeant Hadrian, Master-at-Arms
- Matthew Bennett as Aaron Doral
- Kate Vernon as Ellen Tigh
- Alonso Oyarzun as Socinus
- Nicki Clyne as Cally Henderson
- Bodie Olmos as Brendan "Hot Dog" Costanza
- Christina Schild as journalist Playa Kohn/Palacios
- Biski Gugushe as journalist Eick/Sekou Hamilton
- Colby Johannson as Dwight "Flat-Top" Saunders
- Luciana Carro as Louanne "Kat" Katraine
- Cailin Stadnyk as Ensign Davis
- Terry Chen as Perry/Chuckles
- Leah Cairns as Margaret "Racetrack" Edmondson
- Jennifer Halley as Diana "Hardball" Seelix

=== Guest ===
- Dominic Zamprogna as James "Jammer" Lyman
- Callum Keith Rennie as Leoben Conoy
- Robert Wisden as Wallace Gray
- David Kaye as journalist James McManus
- Alex Zahara as Valance
- Patrick Gallagher as Leon Grimes
- Malcolm Stewart as Marshall Bagot

== Episodes ==
In the following list, "Survivor count" refers to the number of surviving Colonial citizens and military, provided at some point during the episode.

No. overall	No. in season	Title	Survivor count	Directed by	Written by	Original release date
1	1	"33"	49,998	Michael Rymer	Ronald D. Moore	October 18, 2004 (Sky1); January 14, 2005 (Sci Fi)
Following the exodus from the Twelve Colonies, the human fleet has to make an FTL jump every 33 minutes to escape their Cylon pursuers, while the survivors cope with their losses and lack of sleep. After 238 jumps (five and a half days of pursuit), the civilian ship Olympic Carrier is mistakenly left behind with 1,345 on board; after 33 minutes, no Cylons appear, suggesting that they were tracking the Carrier. After the Carrier reappears followed by Cylons, Lee "Apollo" Adama and Kara "Starbuck" Thrace reluctantly destroy the civilian ship, believing it to be a threat to the rest of the fleet; the fleet finally escapes the Cylon pursuit. A copy of Number Six residing in Gaius Baltar's mind ("Inner Six") tries to convince him that God is watching over him, as one of the Carrier's passengers had previously planned to meet with President Laura Roslin, presumably revealing Baltar's role in the Cylon attack on the Colonies. On a Cylon-occupied human planet of Caprica, Karl "Helo" Agathon is pursued by the Cylons, but is rescued by a copy of Sharon "Boomer" Valerii. (Note: Hereafter, Sharon "Boomer" Valerii residing on Galactica is referred to as Boomer, and her copy on Caprica is referred to as Sharon.)
2	2	"Water"	47,973	Marita Grabiak	Ronald D. Moore	October 25, 2004 (Sky1); January 14, 2005 (Sci Fi)
Multiple explosions on Galactica lead to the loss of 60% of the fleet's water reserves. Boomer experiences multiple blackouts where she suddenly finds herself soaked in water or carrying explosives without realizing how it happened; her secret romantic partner Chief Galen Tyrol helps her to avoid becoming a suspect in the explosion investigation. Commander William Adama suspects the involvement of a Cylon agent in the explosion and assigns Lt. Felix Gaeta to help Baltar speed up his work on the Cylon detector. During the water search, Boomer experiences another episode of unawareness where her ship detects water but she cannot properly read the reading and plans to detonate her ship instead, but later comes to her senses and reports her findings; the human fleet celebrates the water discovery. Roslin hires Lee as her military advisor. On Caprica, Helo bonds with Sharon.
3	3	"Bastille Day"	47,958	Allan Kroeker	Toni Graphia	November 1, 2004 (Sky1); January 21, 2005 (Sci Fi)
Roslin and Commander Adama send a delegation led by Lee to the prison ship Astral Queen to recruit 1,000 prisoners to mine ice for the fleet. Tom Zarek, a renowned convicted terrorist, rejects the offer on behalf of all prisoners. Zarek and the prisoners start a riot, taking all the delegates hostage; Zarek demands Roslin's resignation and new elections. Starbuck leads an assault team to kill Zarek and free the hostages; before they succeed, Lee reaches an agreement with Zarek — the prisoners would end the riot and mine the water, but the government would hold elections in seven months. Meanwhile, Commander Adama gives Baltar a nuclear warhead to help him complete the Cylon detector. On Caprica, Helo and Sharon reach a deserted city, while two humanoid Cylons, copies of Six and Aaron Doral observe them.
4	4	"Act of Contrition"	47,958	Rod Hardy	Bradley Thompson & David Weddle	November 8, 2004 (Sky1); January 28, 2005 (Sci Fi)
After many of Galactica's pilots die in a deck accident, Starbuck begins training new ones. She is however conflicted as she still feels guilty about the death of her fiancé and Commander Adama's son Zak two years ago — being his instructor, she unfairly passed him in the basic flight test; this led to his death as he didn't have the necessary flight skills. Being overcautious, Starbuck washes out all of her new trainees after their first day of training. After she confesses to Adama about her role in Zak's death, he feels hurt and angered, but orders her to reinstate the trainees and resume the trainings. During another exercise, Starbuck and her trainees are attacked by a squadron of Cylon Raiders; they defeat the Cylons, but Starbuck's ship is heavily damaged and crashes to the nearby moon; and she ejects into the moon's atmosphere. In Galactica's sickbay, Roslin visits doctor Sherman Cottle who confirms her diagnosis of advanced breast cancer and agrees to help procure "Chamalla" extract for her as an alternative treatment. On Caprica, Helo and Sharon find a fallout shelter with food and medical supplies.
5	5	"You Can't Go Home Again"	47,945	Sergio Mimica-Gezzan	Carla Robinson	November 15, 2004 (Sky1); February 4, 2005 (Sci Fi)
Continuing from the previous episode, Starbuck is stranded on a barren moon. Commander Adama directs all Galactica's resources to search for Starbuck, but they cannot find her, since the moon has a dense layer of clouds making its surface difficult to see. Starbuck finds a downed Cylon Raider from their previous confrontation. Having broken through the Raider's hull, she discovers it is made of living tissue in addition to mechanical parts; Starbuck uses it to replenish her oxygen supply and attempts to repurpose it for crewed flight. Roslin convinces Adama to call off the search operation after they estimate that Starbuck must have run out of oxygen by then, and agree that the continuing resource spending might endanger the entire fleet. As Galactica is about to leave the system, Starbuck appears flying the Raider and rejoins the fleet. On Caprica, two Cylon Centurions find Helo and Sharon in their shelter. Helo defeats them, but Sharon goes missing.
6	6	"Litmus"	47,945	Rod Hardy	Jeff Vlaming	November 22, 2004 (Sky1); February 11, 2005 (Sci Fi)
A copy of Aaron Doral commits a suicide bombing aboard Galactica. Roslin informs the entire fleet about the existence of humanoid Cylons, and Commander Adama appoints Sergeant Hadrian to lead an investigation of how Doral got aboard and got access to explosives. Since Tyrol and Boomer were having a secret romantic meeting at the time of the bombing, Tyrol's team tries to cover for them; Specialist Socinus, one of Tyrol's subordinates, is caught giving false testimony regarding Tyrol's whereabouts. After Hadrian puts Adama on stand and accuses him of covering for Tyrol and Boomer, Adama dissolves the tribunal and orders Hadrian confined. Roslin announces that Socinus was found guilty of negligence which allowed a Cylon to steal explosives. Trying to save Socinus, Tyrol confesses to Adama about his illicit relationship with Boomer; Adama refuses to hold Tyrol officially responsible as he is a more valuable crew member than Socinus — instead Tyrol's punishment will be his guilt for ruining Socinus's life. Tyrol ends his relationship with Boomer. On Caprica, Sharon, Six and Doral fake Sharon's abduction by a Cylon Centurion; Helo finds and rescues her.
7	7	"Six Degrees of Separation"	47,942	Robert Young	Michael Angeli	November 29, 2004 (Sky1); February 18, 2005 (Sci Fi)
After Baltar mocks Six's belief in God, she disappears from his mind. A physical copy of Six appears on Galactica, introducing herself as "Shelly Godfrey" and accusing Baltar of sabotaging the human defenses before the Cylon attack on the Colonies. Baltar desperately tries to prove his innocence, but fails. After he prays to God and pledges himself to His will, Six reappears in his mind, and Gaeta, who was studying evidence presented by Godfrey, finds it to be fake; Baltar is released and publicly exonerated, while Godfrey mysteriously disappears from the ship. Meanwhile, Boomer helps Tyrol make progress in analyzing the Cylon Raider captured by Starbuck, and Roslin temporarily gets sick due to overdoing her anti-cancer medication, causing a brief fleet-wide scare. On Caprica, Helo and Sharon are on the run from the Cylon Centurions. As they hide, Helo confesses of his feelings for her and they make love.
8	8	"Flesh and Bone"	47,938	Brad Turner	Toni Graphia	December 6, 2004 (Sky1); February 25, 2005 (Sci Fi)
A copy of Leoben Conoy is captured in the fleet after he appears in Roslin's dream. On Roslin's orders, Starbuck is sent to interrogate Leoben. Leoben tells Starbuck he planted a nuclear bomb set to explode soon. She tortures him for information about the bomb, but instead he talks about God, the soul and the cyclical nature of time. Leoben tells Starbuck that humans are destined to find Kobol and then Earth. After Leoben calls upon Roslin in her dream, she comes and promises him freedom. He reveals there is no bomb and tells her that "Adama is a Cylon". Roslin orders to put him out the airlock. Starbuck prays for his soul. Meanwhile, Boomer wants to prove to both herself and Tyrol that she is not a Cylon; she goes to Baltar to get tested. The test reveals that she is a Cylon, but Baltar, afraid of her reaction, tells her she is not. On Caprica, Sharon reports to Doral and Six that she had sex with Helo. They order her to take him to a cabin nearby and keep him there, or kill him otherwise. Instead, Sharon runs away with Helo to keep him safe.
9	9	"Tigh Me Up, Tigh Me Down"	47,905	Edward James Olmos	Jeff Vlaming	December 13, 2004 (Sky1); March 4, 2005 (Sci Fi)
Having completed work on the Cylon detector, Baltar begins testing the Galactica crew. Though she was presumed dead in the original Cylon attack, Colonel Saul Tigh's wife Ellen appears in the fleet. Since Commander Adama suspects Ellen, and Roslin suspects Adama and then Ellen of being Cylons, they give Baltar conflicting orders as to who to test first, frustrating him and interrupting and delaying his work multiple times. Mutual suspicions, Adama's concerns regarding Ellen's bad influence on Saul, and Ellen's erratic accusations against Adama of sexual harassment cause a quarrel between Roslin, Adama, Saul, and Ellen. The quarrel is resolved after Saul and Adama team up to repel an attack by a Cylon Raider and Baltar completes Ellen's test and declares her human. A conversation between Six and Baltar reveals that the result may have been fake and that Baltar would declare anyone human to avoid further fuss. On Caprica, Helo and Sharon avoid capture by running through a sewer system. At Sharon's suggestion, they head to the city of Delphi where they can find a ship and escape from the planet. Six and Doral express envy of the feelings between Helo and Sharon.
10	10	"The Hand of God"	47,905	Jeff Woolnough	Bradley Thompson & David Weddle	January 3, 2005 (Sky1); March 11, 2005 (Sci Fi)
With the human fleet running dangerously low on "tylium", the main component of the fleet's fuel, humans discover a heavily guarded Cylon-controlled asteroid with large tylium deposits. The Galactica crew plan an ambitious operation to destroy the Cylon base and capture the asteroid. Baltar suggests hitting a specific spot to destroy the base without damaging the tylium ore, but does not know which spot to choose. Six advises him to seek guidance from God, and Baltar points to a random structure on the map. Mysteriously, he ends up being right; humans succeed and celebrate. Six tells Baltar that God ensured his guess to be correct. Meanwhile, Roslin hallucinates of snakes due to her anti-cancer medication. Priestess Elosha tells her about an ancient prophecy mentioning a "dying leader" who would bring humans to the new home. On Caprica, Helo and Sharon hide in an abandoned barn as Sharon gets sick. They spot a passing Cylon patrol led by a copy of Six and run away. Unaware of the existence of humanoid Cylons, Helo gets confused, since he already saw another copy of Six killed by Sharon.
11	11	"Colonial Day"	47,898	Jonas Pate	Carla Robinson	January 10, 2005 (Sky1); March 18, 2005 (Sci Fi)
To celebrate the anniversary of the Articles of Colonization, Roslin reconstitutes the Quorum of Twelve, a representative body within the Colonial government. Tom Zarek, who had called for Roslin's resignation, is nominated to fill the vacant role of Vice President. Worried that Zarek may try to assassinate her if he wins, Roslin initially drafts her friend and confidante Wallace Gray to run against Zarek. After Gray proves uncharismatic, she pushes him aside in favor of Baltar. Lee Adama and Starbuck arrest a man named Valance who has smuggled a handgun aboard Cloud Nine, the ship where the Quorum meeting is being held. They suspect that he may have ties to Zarek but find him dead in his holding cell in an apparent suicide. Baltar wins the election. Zarek warns Roslin he will be back during the presidential election in six months and claims he did not kill Valance. On Caprica, Helo and Sharon prepare to hijack a Cylon ship to escape the planet when Helo sees another woman who looks like an identical copy of Sharon. Realizing that Sharon is a humanoid Cylon, he flees.
12	12	"Kobol's Last Gleaming (Part 1)"	47,897	Michael Rymer	Story by : David Eick; Teleplay by : Ronald D. Moore	January 17, 2005 (Sky1); March 25, 2005 (Sci Fi)
The discovery of the lost birthplace of humanity causes a split between Roslin and Adama.
13	13	"Kobol's Last Gleaming (Part 2)"	47,887	Michael Rymer	Story by : David Eick; Teleplay by : Ronald D. Moore	January 24, 2005 (Sky1); April 1, 2005 (Sci Fi)
The political crisis between Roslin and Adama forces Apollo to make a difficult decision, as Starbuck returns to Caprica on a mission for Roslin.

== Production ==
Battlestar Galactica's first season of thirteen one-hour episodes was ordered by the Sci-Fi Channel on February 10, 2004, with production taking place in Vancouver, British Columbia, Canada. Produced in 2004 by David Eick and Ronald D. Moore, and starring the original cast from the 2003 miniseries, it began airing in the United Kingdom and Ireland on October 18, 2004. The series proved successful, attracting favorable comments from reviewers, and generating considerable anticipation in the U.S.

It began airing in North America three months later, on January 14, 2005, in the United States, and January 15 in Canada. The first episode aired in the U.S. became one of the highest-rated programs ever on Sci-Fi, with 3.1 million viewers. The series' first season became the network's highest-rated original series to date.

Battlestar Galactica's first episode was later made available for viewing in its entirety, and without charge from the Sci-Fi website. Moore also sought to address the "Internet Generation" by posting podcast commentaries on individual episodes on the official Sci-Fi website.

== Reception ==
=== Critical response ===
On Rotten Tomatoes, the season has an approval rating of 90% with an average score of 8.4 out of 10 based on 20 reviews. The website's critical consensus reads, "A captivating combination of riveting political drama and science fiction fantasy make Battlestar Galactica must-see sci-fi."

=== Awards ===
Wins

- 2005 Hugo Award for Best Dramatic Presentation, Short Form ("33")
- 2005 Peabody Award
- 2005 Spacey Award for Favorite Limited TV Series

In its statement accompanying the announcement of the show's Peabody Award, the Peabody Board noted "Battlestar Galactica is not just another apocalyptic vision of the future but an intense drama that poses provocative questions regarding religion, politics, sex and what it truly means to be 'human'.... Writers Ronald D. Moore, Toni Graphia, David Weddle, Bradley Thompson, Carla Robinson, Jeff Vlaming, Michael Angeli, and David Eick take full advantage to give us plotlines that are deeply personal and relatable, while never compromising their affinity and passion for science fiction".

Nominations

- 2005 Emmy Award for Outstanding Special Visual Effects for a Series ("33", "The Hand of God")
- 2005 Saturn Awards for Best Television Release on DVD Season 1
- 2004 Visual Effects Society Award for Outstanding Performance by an Animated Character in a Live Act on Broadcast Program ("33")

== Home video releases ==
The first season was released on DVD in region 1 on September 20, 2005, in region 2 on March 28, 2005 and in region 4 on August 15, 2006. It was also released in region 1 in HD DVD on December 4, 2007 and on Blu-ray Disc on January 5, 2010.

The sets include all 13 episodes of the first season and the miniseries. Special features include commentary on the miniseries and "33" by executive producers Ronald D. Moore, David Eick and director Michael Rymer. Moore and Eick provide commentaries for "Bastille Day", "Act of Contrition" and "You Can't Go Home Again". Beginning with episode 9, Moore began recording podcast commentaries for the episodes on the official Battlestar Galactica website; Moore provides commentaries for "Tigh Me Up, Tigh Me Down", "The Hand of God", "Colonial Day", "Kobol's Last Gleaming (Part 1)" and "Kobol's Last Gleaming (Part 2)". Behind-the-scenes featurettes include a collection of individual featurettes—"From Miniseries to Series", "Change is Good, Now They're Babes", "The Cylon Centurion", "Future/Past Technology", "The Doctor is out (of his mind)", "Production", "Visual Effects" and "Epilogue". Also included is a featurette titled "Battlestar Galactica: The Series Lowdown", deleted scenes for various episodes, and a montage of sketches and art for the series.
