= Colonial Day =

- Battlestar Galactica episode
- Episode no.: Season 1 Episode 11
- Directed by: Jonas Pate
- Written by: Carla Robinson
- Original air dates: January 10, 2005 (UK); March 18, 2005 (US)

Guest appearances
- Richard Hatch as Tom Zarek (Note: Special guest star); Kate Vernon as Ellen Tigh; Robert Wisden as Wallace Gray; David Kaye as James McManus; Alex Zahara as Valance; Patrick Gallagher as Grimes; Malcolm Stewart as Marshall Bagot; Christina Schild as Playa Palacios (Note: This character is listed as "Playa Kohn" in previous episodes.); Biski Gugushe as Sekou Hamilton; Patricia Idlette as Sarah Porter

Episode chronology
← Previous "The Hand of God"	Next → "Kobol's Last Gleaming"
- Battlestar Galactica season 1

"Colonial Day" is the eleventh episode of the reimagined Battlestar Galactica television series.

In the episode, Tom Zarek seeks to become vice president, but President Laura Roslin thwarts him by nominating the popular scientist Gaius Baltar, who ultimately wins. A possible presidential assassin is captured but cannot be linked to Zarek. On Caprica, Helo discovers that Caprica-Boomer is a Cylon.

== Plot ==
President Laura Roslin reconstitutes the Quorum of Twelve, a representative body within the Colonial government where each of the twelve colonies has one representative. Tom Zarek, who called for Roslin's resignation and orchestrated a prison riot in "Bastille Day", is selected to represent the colony of Sagittaron, and Gaius Baltar is selected to represent Caprica.

At the first Quorum meeting, Zarek is nominated to fill the vacant role of vice president, who would replace Roslin if something happens to her. Worried that Zarek may try to assassinate her if he wins, Roslin initially drafts her friend and confidante Wallace Gray to run against Zarek. After Gray proves uncharismatic, she pushes him aside in favor of Baltar.

Apollo and Starbuck arrest a man named Valance who has smuggled a handgun aboard Cloud Nine, the ship where the Quorum meeting is being held. They suspect that he may have ties to Zarek but find him dead in his holding cell in an apparent suicide.

Baltar wins the election. Zarek warns Roslin he will be back during the presidential election in six months and claims he did not kill Valance.

On Caprica, Helo and Boomer prepare to hijack a Cylon ship to escape the planet when he sees another Number Eight copy that looks just like Boomer. Realizing that she, too, is a humanoid Cylon, he flees.

== Production ==
"Colonial Day" was originally conceived as the first season's "West Wing episode." Executive producer Ronald D. Moore characterized the Quorum of Twelve in the original Battlestar Galactica as a hybrid political-military body whose unwise decisions Commander Adama frequently overruled. The creators revived the Quorum in this episode as a political body similar to the United States Senate and the United Nations Security Council to exhibit a democratic, republican Colonial government in order to draw parallels with real-world governments, particularly that of the United States. Moore believed that a story about people making difficult political choices in an environment where their survival was threatened would be relevant for questions in contemporary American society about the war on terror, perceived creeping authoritarianism in American government, and the tradeoff between liberty and security. The assassination subplot was added to give the episode, in Moore's words, "a certain tension and jeopardy" beyond what one might see in an episode of The West Wing. Moore was ultimately not fully satisfied with his own writing in this regard because the assassination fizzles, but he thought director Jonas Pate made the episode work nonetheless.

Moore wanted to show life in the fleet away from Galactica but was opposed to a "planet of the week" format. Cloud Nine was created as a location within the fleet that could provide a visual environment replicating that of Caprica and the other Twelve Colonies. The exterior shots on Cloud Nine were filmed at the University of British Columbia, in the Rose Garden and in front of the Chan Centre for the Performing Arts. The Quorum meeting was filmed in the Chan Centre's Chan Shun Concert Hall, and most indoor scenes set on Cloud Nine were filmed in the lobby of the Chan Centre.

The writers intended "Colonial Day" to expand upon the character of Roslin. Before the Cylon attack in the miniseries, she was a quiet person who preferred to avoid attention, but the crisis has brought out her leadership qualities. Moore characterized Roslin as a pragmatist, as shown by her recognition of Baltar's media savvy, her selection of Baltar despite lingering distrust following his actions in the episode "Six Degrees of Separation", and her willingness to push aside Gray despite his personal hurt. Moore contrasts her with Commander Adama, whom he sees as more of an idealist.

When Zarek arrives on Cloud Nine the press and Zarek himself are unsure whether she will shake his hand; she does. The tension over this was inspired by questions over whether Yitzhak Rabin would shake Yasser Arafat's hand at the signing of the Oslo Accords in 1993.

Moore conceded that there may have been a larger in-universe media presence in this episode and elsewhere in the series than would have been strictly realistic under the circumstances. He defended the choice as one that shows a setup similar to the White House press corps and thereby grounds the viewer in a familiar understanding of the influence of the presidency.

Several weeks after shooting of "Colonial Day" completed, the writers inserted a short scene appearing immediately before the vote count in the Quorum. In this scene, Apollo and Starbuck discuss the possibility of a future assassination attempt as they dress on Galactica. The writers inserted it to augment the assassination subplot when early cuts of the episode ran short. At the end of the scene, Apollo reacts incredulously to Starbuck's claim that she "clean[s] up good sometimes." This sets up Apollo's astonishment at Starbuck's appearance at Colonial Day and further builds the characters' romantic tension. Adama and Roslin's dance is also an expression of mutual attraction, though a smaller one.

During the interrogation scene, Apollo throws Valance's briefcase across the room when Valance gives an unsatisfactory answer. This was actor Jamie Bamber's idea.

Helo and Caprica-Boomer's second scene in "Colonial Day" marks the debut of the Cylon Heavy Raider. The shot with the Heavy Raider was filmed in front of UBC's Koerner Library. This location was also used in the Battlestar Galactica spinoff Caprica.

== Reception ==
Jason Davis of Mania gave "Colonial Day" an A, commending the performances of guest stars Richard Hatch (Zarek) and Robert Wisden (Gray) as well as main cast members Bamber (Apollo) and Katee Sackhoff (Starbuck). Davis also praised the perceived connection between the themes of the episode and contemporary politics. Simon Brew of Den of Geek also reviewed the episode favorably, praising the show's ability to skillfully address such topics as manipulation of media or behind-the-scenes political machinations and to portray complex multidimensional characters. Susan Tankersley of Television Without Pity gave "Colonial Day" a B−, agreeing with Moore that the main plot and assassination subplots did not fit together well but nonetheless calling it "not a bad episode". Arianne Gift of Game Rant said that the episode highlighted the fragile nature of unity among the Twelve Colonies and emphasized that maintaining cohesion is an ongoing struggle. Liz Farrell of Multiversity Comics described the episode as plot-driven and fast-paced and also noted that it emphasized the dangers of politics over war. Sonia Saraiya of The A.V. Club gave "Colonial Day" a B+, calling the episode "funny", in part for its display of humanity's flaws, and also called it a "Laura Roslin's episode".

== Connections to other series elements ==
- In a podcast accompanying the episode, Moore compared the process of appointing the vice president of the Colonies portrayed in "Colonial Day" to the process by which Gerald Ford became Vice President of the United States in 1973 following the resignation of Spiro Agnew. Moore said that under normal circumstances the vice president would "presumably" be elected together with the president. The question of how the vice president of the Colonies is normally chosen in-universe is resolved in the second-season double episode "Lay Down Your Burdens", when Zarek is elected Vice President as Baltar's running mate.
- Starbuck and Baltar dance together at the Colonial Day celebration. In the first scene of the following episode, "Kobol's Last Gleaming", they have a one-night stand that ends abruptly when Kara calls out Lee's name. The writers intended the sexual tension evident between Lee and Kara in this episode to contrast with this.
- During the first Quorum meeting, Head Six tells Baltar she doesn't mind if he has sex with other women. Baltar has trysts with journalist Playa Palacios later in "Colonial Day" and then with Kara Thrace in the following episode, "Kobol's Last Gleaming". Head Six reacts negatively to the latter encounter.
- Adama and Roslin's closeness in this episode contrasts with the events of "Kobol's Last Gleaming", in which Adama mounts a coup and throws Roslin in the brig. Their mutual attraction becomes a sexual relationship by the fourth-season episode "A Disquiet Follows My Soul".
