= The Hand of God (2004 Battlestar Galactica) =

- Battlestar Galactica episode
- Episode no.: Season 1 Episode 10
- Directed by: Jeff Woolnough
- Written by: Bradley Thompson; David Weddle
- Original air dates: January 3, 2005 (UK); March 11, 2005 (US)

Guest appearances
- Lorena Gale as Priestess Elosha; Nicki Clyne as Cally; Cailin Stadnyk as Ensign Davis; Bodie Olmos as Hot Dog; Luciana Carro as Katraine; Terry Chen as Perry/Chuckles; Christina Schild as Playa Kohn; Biski Gugushe as Hamilton; Paul Cummings as Pilot/Fireball; Camille Sullivan as Pilot/Stepchild

Episode chronology
← Previous "Tigh Me Up, Tigh Me Down"	Next → "Colonial Day"
- Battlestar Galactica season 1

"The Hand of God" is the tenth episode of the reimagined Battlestar Galactica television series. It shares its title with the last episode of the original series.

In the episode, the humans capture a fuel-rich asteroid from the Cylons using a plan devised by Lieutenant Kara "Starbuck" Thrace. President Laura Roslin begins seeing visions, and Gaius Baltar comes to believe that his contribution to the raid on the asteroid was guided by God. On Caprica, Helo and Caprica-Boomer keep running from the Cylons.

== Plot ==
President Roslin experiences a hallucination of snakes produced by the herbs she is taking to fight her breast cancer. Later, Priestess Elosha tells her about a prophecy of a leader of the human race in exile: the leader receives a vision of 12 serpents and later dies of "a wasting disease." The Priestess questions the president if she's indeed dying and both are surprised to seemingly confirm manifestation of ancient prophecy.

An asteroid made of tylium, a necessary fuel to jumping which is in short supply, is discovered, but it is being mined by Cylons. Commander Adama decides to take the asteroid by force and, with help from Starbuck (who is unable to fly a Viper because of a knee injury she received), comes up with a plan that uses the civilian fleet to draw out the Cylon Raiders. President Roslin is briefed on the plan and approves.

The raid begins with Cylon Raiders moving toward civilian freighters, but more are sent toward Galactica, initiating a dog fight that draws the Raiders away from the freighters, which the briefing did not anticipate. Just as all seems lost, the freighters unveil a secreted squadron of 12 Vipers led by Apollo, who now have a clear path to the asteroid. Adama admits to Roslin that he strategically concealed this part of Starbuck's plan in her initial briefing.

In an attempt to perform in Starbuck's out-of-the-box style, Apollo avoids the facility's defenses by flying through the mine tunnels. He bombs its tylium containers, setting off a large explosion and destroying the base while leaving several years' worth of tylium for the fleet to mine.

Dr. Baltar is surprised at the success, as he had only been guessing when asked to identify the location of tylium containers. Head Six prompts him to begin thinking that he may have a role to play on behalf of the Cylon God that he had previously mocked, whilst Gaius is beginning to be faithful, encouraged as a chosen "instrument of God".

On Caprica, Helo and Sharon hide from the pursuing Cylons in an abandoned stable. They flee after spotting a nearby group of Cylon Centurions led by a Number Six copy, the first indication to Helo that there are humanoid Cylons.

== Production ==
The writing staff referred to this episode as "the Big Mac" during production because they believed the action would make it a crowd pleaser. It was originally slated to be the ninth episode of the first season, with "Tigh Me Up, Tigh Me Down" as episode 10. Executive producer Ronald D. Moore realized that the end of the eighth episode, "Flesh and Bone", in which Leoben Conoy causes Roslin to fear that Adama is a Cylon, was an ideal segue to the paranoia of "Tigh Me Up, Tigh Me Down", so they were switched. The only major change that had to be made was to switch the action on Caprica between the episodes.

Roslin's conversation with Elosha in this episode begins the introduction of the Battlestar Galactica mythos in the re-imagined series. The show's creators wanted to retain the epic narrative of the original series but introduce it gradually, after fans had already committed to the show.

Roslin receives her briefing on Starbuck's plan on an illuminated table with large figurines representing ships; the plan is later tracked on it as the raid is underway. Moore explained that the decision to use the "big board" was a result of financial and narrative constraints. Using computer graphics to narrate space battles is often expensive, and the product often has to be simplified heavily so the viewer can understand it. The idea for a big board came from classic films about World War II such as Sink the Bismarck!, Tora! Tora! Tora!, and Midway. The idea for the models came from production designer Richard Hudolin.

In an homage to the original series, the appearance of the freighter that conceals the Vipers is based on the Colonial Movers freighter from the original series. Apollo's attack run through the mine shaft is an homage to Star Wars.

Show composer Bear McCreary said "The Hand of God" was one of his favorite episodes to score of the first season and described it as "a lot of fun."

== Reception ==
"The Hand of God" was nominated for a Primetime Emmy Award for Outstanding Special Visual Effects in a Series in 2005. It lost to Lost's pilot episode.

Susan Tankersley of Television Without Pity gave "The Hand of God" an A−, calling the action sequences "pretty awesome". Simon Brew of Den of Geek reviewed the episode favorably, singling out for praise the use of the big board and "the increasing complexity of Roslin".

John Kubicek of BuddyTV ranked "The Hand of God" as the 11th best episode of the re-imagined Battlestar Galactica and called the episode "brilliant".

== Series context ==
Caprica-Sharon's vomiting is the first sign that she is pregnant.
