= Litmus (Battlestar Galactica) =

- Battlestar Galactica episode
- Episode no.: Season 1 Episode 6
- Directed by: Rod Hardy
- Written by: Jeff Vlaming
- Original air dates: November 22, 2004 (UK); February 11, 2005 (US)

Guest appearances
- Donnelly Rhodes as Doctor Cottle; Jill Teed as Sergeant Hadrian; Dominic Zamprogna as Jammer; Alonso Oyarzun as Socinus; Nicki Clyne as Cally; Matthew Bennett as Number Five

Episode chronology
← Previous "You Can't Go Home Again"	Next → "Six Degrees of Separation"
- Battlestar Galactica season 1

"Litmus" is the sixth episode of the reimagined Battlestar Galactica television series. In the episode, an investigation into a Cylon infiltration comes to focus on the relationship between Chief Galen Tyrol and the Galactica copy of Boomer (who is a Cylon sleeper agent) in order to weed out other sleeper agents.

== Plot ==
=== In the fleet ===
As Chief Tyrol and Boomer have an illicit encounter, a copy of Aaron Doral boards the ship amongst a group of civilians before making his way to C deck. There, Doral is spotted by both Colonel Tigh and Commander Adama. When confronted, Doral commits a suicide bombing, killing three people and injuring thirteen more.

In the aftermath, Adama reveals to Galactica's master-at-arms Sergeant Hadrian that the Cylons now have human form and that there are many copies of each model. Adama requests that Hadrian run an investigation into Doral's bombing. Citing the recent security breaches such as the water tank explosion, Hadrian requests an independent tribunal that will allow her to act separate from command review. Adama agrees despite President Roslin warning that such a tribunal could turn into a witch hunt. In light of the suicide bombing, Roslin reluctantly agrees to tell the public that the Cylons now have human form in hopes that despite the panic it will cause, that the action will help to expose more Cylon agents within the fleet. Roslin also shares with the press pictures of Doral and Leoben Conoy, the two known Cylon models.

While being visited by Baltar, an injured Starbuck suggests that Baltar's Cylon detector project, which is located on C deck, was the target of Doral's bombing. Frightened, Baltar decides to destroy his project but is forcefully stopped by his internal Six.

Hadrian's investigation is able to determine that a Cylon agent or collaborator used an open hatch on the hangar deck to reach a small arms locker where a Marine guard was killed and the explosives stolen. Hadrian focuses on Chief Tyrol after the deck gang, in an attempt to protect Tyrol, concocts three different stories about where he had been. Eventually Hadrian goes so far as to question Adama, implying that Tyrol and Boomer are both Cylon collaborators. Stating that Hadrian has lost perspective and turned the tribunal into a witch hunt, Adama dismisses it and has Hadrian arrested despite the tribunal pointing out that he has no power over them. In the aftermath of Hadrian's arrest, the tribunal places the blame on Specialist Socinus who had confessed to leaving the hatch open under interrogation to protect Tyrol. Socinus is stripped of his rank and confined to the brig. Despite knowing Socinus is innocent, Adama refuses to intervene on his behalf.

Following Socinus's arrest, Tyrol ends his relationship with Boomer, recognizing that his reckless actions caused an innocent man to be imprisoned. Tyrol begins to grow suspicious of Boomer, as she came through the hatch in question just before the bombing.

=== On Caprica ===
Seventeen days after the Fall of the Twelve Colonies, following Sharon's apparent capture by Cylon forces, Sharon, a copy of Aaron Doral and Number Six watch Helo from a distance. The three have faked Sharon's capture by Cylon forces to test Helo's love for her by determining whether or not he will go after Sharon or will continue to find a way off of Caprica.

At nightfall, the three observe Helo as he apparently chooses to abandon Sharon before changing his mind. To continue on with the next phase of their plan, the Six brutally beats Sharon. Helo's search for Sharon leads him to a wrecked parking garage where he finds a Cylon Centurion dragging Sharon. Helo destroys the Centurion and "rescues" the beaten and bloody Sharon. Unknown to Helo, the entire event is watched by Doral and Six from a distance.

== Analysis ==
On his blog, executive producer Ronald D. Moore asks, "Was it wrong for Adama to dissolve a legally constituted judicial tribunal... simply because he sensed it becoming a witch-hunt or was he actually protecting the larger concepts of justice?" as one of a series of difficult political questions he felt Battlestar Galactica asked during its first season. He poses the question as one for valid debate and does not suggest an answer.

Amanda Keith of the Los Angeles Newspaper Group compares Tyrol to Adama. Though Tyrol runs a tight deck, he also has a soft spot for his subordinates, as evidenced by his toleration of his deckhands' illicit distilling. Like Adama, he also inspires profound loyalty; hence Socinus's confession to keeping the hatch open, which Keith calls his "boneheaded move".

Susan A. George writes that the narrative of Tyrol being involved with a deceptive, dangerous woman (Boomer) and being nearly destroyed by her fits into the tradition of film noir. In George's view, Boomer threatens "male authority and the hierarchical command order". Commenting on the scene in which Six chokes Baltar, threatens that he must finish the Cylon detector, and then kisses him, George observes a "mix of sadism and eroticism... characteristic of the femme fatale."

== Reception ==
Simon Brew of Den of Geek praised the episode, calling Adama's refusal to release Socinus and insistence that Tyrol bear the consequences of his bad actions "quality writing and thinking". Susan Tankersley of Television Without Pity gave the episode an F, calling the tribunal "hamfisted" and commenting, "The fact that [Hadrian] was very nearly right [about Tyrol and Boomer] is completely overshadowed", a point Keith echoed. Keith said the episode has "some surprising gems" but is overall "largely flawed". Writing retrospectively in the middle of the series's second season, Jacob Clifton of Television Without Pity said he liked the episode, comparing it favorably to the second-season episodes "The Farm", "Final Cut", and "Scar"; he gave the last of these an A−.

== Connections to other series elements ==
- The episode shows some aspects of the Colonial legal system, including a right against self-incrimination. Hadrian says Tyrol's invocation of this right is evidence against him, but Adama indicates this is contrary to Colonial legal precedent.
- During her conversation with Baltar, Head Six reveals that the Cylons do not know about her.
- During his discussion of the tribunal with Roslin, Adama reveals that his father was a civil liberties lawyer.
- Roslin's release of a mugshot of Leoben Conoy in this episode allows the fleet to identify and detain a Leoben copy in the episode "Flesh and Bone".
- A scene deleted from the first-season finale "Kobol's Last Gleaming" shows Tyrol securing Socinus's release from the brig and berating Socinus for his actions in "Litmus". Socinus is shown serving on Tyrol's Raptor in "Kobol's Last Gleaming".
- In the second-season episode "The Farm", Caprica-Boomer reveals the reason behind the Cylons' interest in Helo's feelings for her: unable to reproduce themselves and unsuccessful in attempts at forced breeding human-Cylon hybrids, they thought love might be the missing ingredient.
- In the second-season episode "Pegasus", Admiral Helena Cain cites Adama's closure of the tribunal in denying his request for a jury court-martial for Helo and Tyrol.
- In Battlestar Galactica: The Plan, it is revealed that Adama was the true target of the bombing and it was conducted on the orders of John Cavil due to Doral's cover previously being blown by Baltar. However, the mystery of the open hatch is not covered there and its shown that Cavil already possessed the suicide vest at the time of ordering Doral to perform the attack.
