= 33 (Battlestar Galactica) =

Pilot episode of the 2004 Battlestar Galactica

- Battlestar Galactica episode
- Episode no.: Season 1 Episode 1
- Directed by: Michael Rymer
- Written by: Ronald D. Moore
- Cinematography by: Stephen McNutt
- Original air dates: October 18, 2004 (UK); January 14, 2005 (US)
- Running time: 45 minutes

Episode chronology
← Previous; Battlestar Galactica: The Miniseries	Next → "Water"
- Battlestar Galactica season 1

"33" is the first episode of the first season and the pilot episode of the reimagined military science fiction television show Battlestar Galactica, immediately following the events of the 2003 miniseries. "33" follows Galactica and its civilian fleet as they are forced to contend with constant Cylon pursuit for days without sleep; they are forced to ultimately destroy one of their own ships to foil the Cylons and earn their first respite of the series.

The episode was written by series creator Ronald D. Moore, and the television directoral debut of Michael Rymer. Moore and executive producer David Eick made the decision to slot this episode as the first of the season because of its potential impact on the audience. "33" distinguished the themes of the new Battlestar Galactica series by following characters on the spaceships, on the planets that were fled, and in the minds of other characters. Attention to detail was prevalent in this first episode; the production team, the editing team, and even the actors themselves strove for authenticity of specific portrayals and moments.

Though there were compromises made due to concerns of the episode being too dark for audiences, the episode was lauded by both cast and crew in addition to winning the 2005 Hugo Award for Best Dramatic Presentation, Short Form. "33" originally aired on Sky One in the United Kingdom on October 18, 2004, and subsequently aired on the Sci Fi Channel in the United States on January 14, 2005, alongside the following episode "Water".

== Plot ==
Having fled the besieged Ragnar Anchorage, the convoy of refugee spaceships is relentlessly pursued and attacked by Cylons. The colonial fleet must execute a faster-than-light (FTL) jump every 33 minutes to escape the Cylons, who consistently arrive at the new jump coordinates approximately 33 minutes later. After over 130 hours and 237 jumps, the fleet's crew and passengers, particularly those aboard Galactica, have been operating without sleep while facing the strain of nearly constant military action.

Upon the 238th consecutive jump, Olympic Carrier (a commercial passenger vessel with 1,345 souls aboard) is left behind and the attacks unexpectedly cease, allowing some respite. When the vessel arrives three hours later, President Laura Roslin and Commander Adama order Capt. Lee "Apollo" Adama and Lt. Kara "Starbuck" Thrace to destroy it, believing that it has been infiltrated by Cylons and now poses a threat to the fleet's safety. The colonial pilots destroy Olympic Carrier while the rest of the colonial fleet jumps away. Baltar's internal Number Six explains to him that God is looking after his interests, implying that a scientist aboard Olympic Carrier was preparing to reveal Baltar's unwitting collusion with the Cylon attack on the colonies.

After the fleet's last jump, the Cylons do not return, and the president's survivor whiteboard aboard Colonial One, the result of a fleetwide census, is updated with one additional soul (to 47,973) after the birth of the fleet's first child—a boy.

Meanwhile, on Caprica, Lt. Karl "Helo" Agathon is captured by a Cylon patrol and then "rescued" from his Cylon captors by a Number Eight in the guise of his crewmate Sharon "Boomer" Valerii, who shoots a Number Six to free him.

== Writing ==
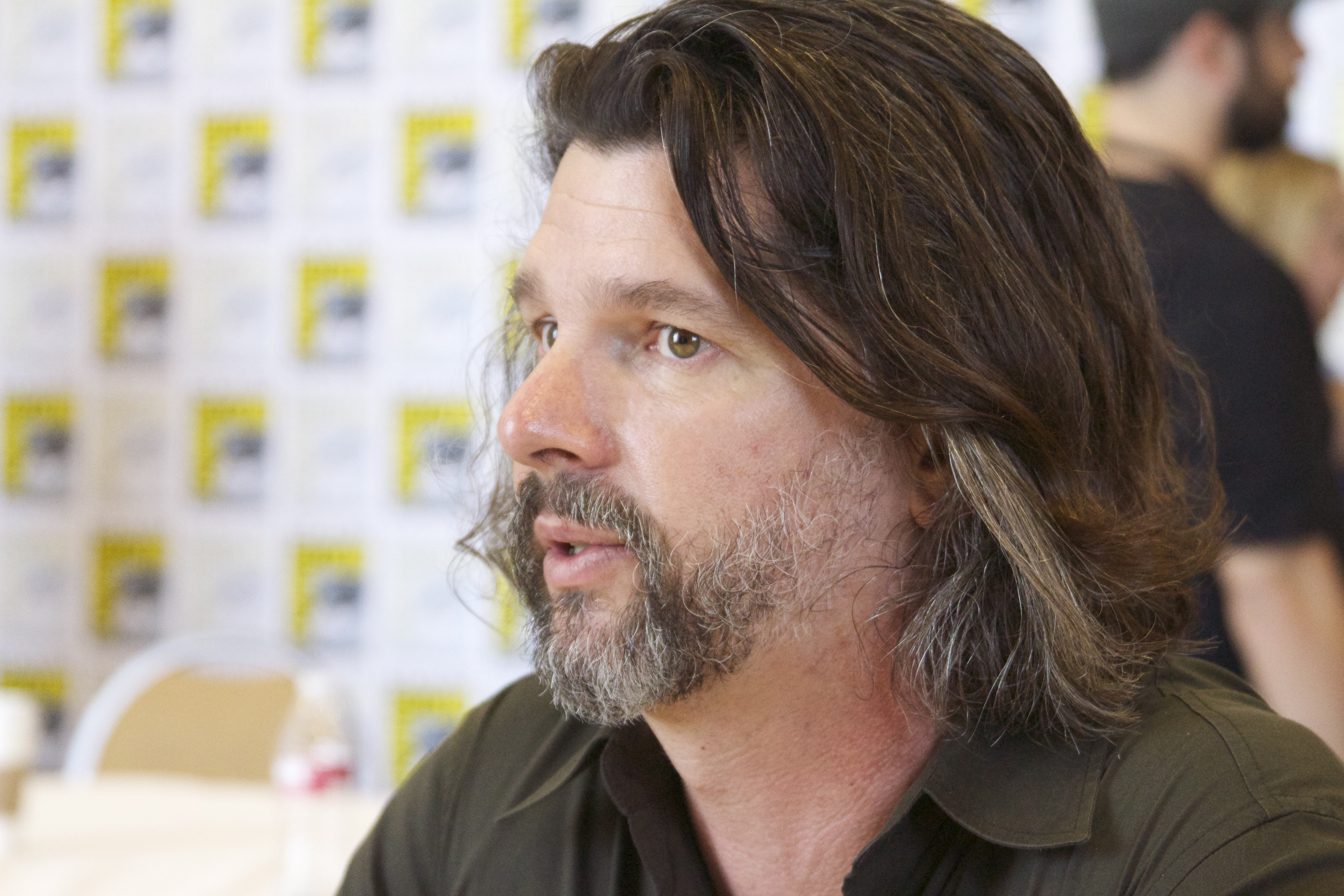
Ronald D. Moore (2013)

While preparing for production of Battlestar Galactica's first season, writer and series creator Ronald D. Moore wrote a short list of potential storylines, one of which was "the fleet jumps every 33 minutes; because the Cylons are relentlessly pursuing them, the crew gets no sleep." Conferring with fellow executive producer David Eick, the two decided that this story would be "the best way to kick off the season". Moore described writing "33" as a great experience; he wrote the whole script without a story outline or much structure, because he was excited to begin the first episode of the first season already "at the end of the road". Moore wrote the episode over his Christmas break before the series was officially picked up, and he later said that this aspect was what made the episode "one of the more fun projects that [he] wrote all of the first season."

David Eick called the episode a "standalone concept" that did not require having seen the miniseries to understand it. Because the miniseries ended "at a very happy place", starting the series in the middle of a crisis without explanation, and showing the audience that "actually, while you—the audience—were away, really bad things have been happening" made for a much more intriguing and interesting story. The complex storyline of "33" was a harbinger for episodes to come, and laid the groundwork with the network and audiences alike.

Moore explained on his blog that the number 33 had no hidden meaning or significance, it was just sufficiently long to allow minor functions like snacking, showering, or napping, but was too short to allow anybody to gain any meaningful sleep and recharge their batteries. Further, Moore intentionally gave the number no meaning to avoid including unnecessary technobabble into a drama-driven episode.

== Production ==
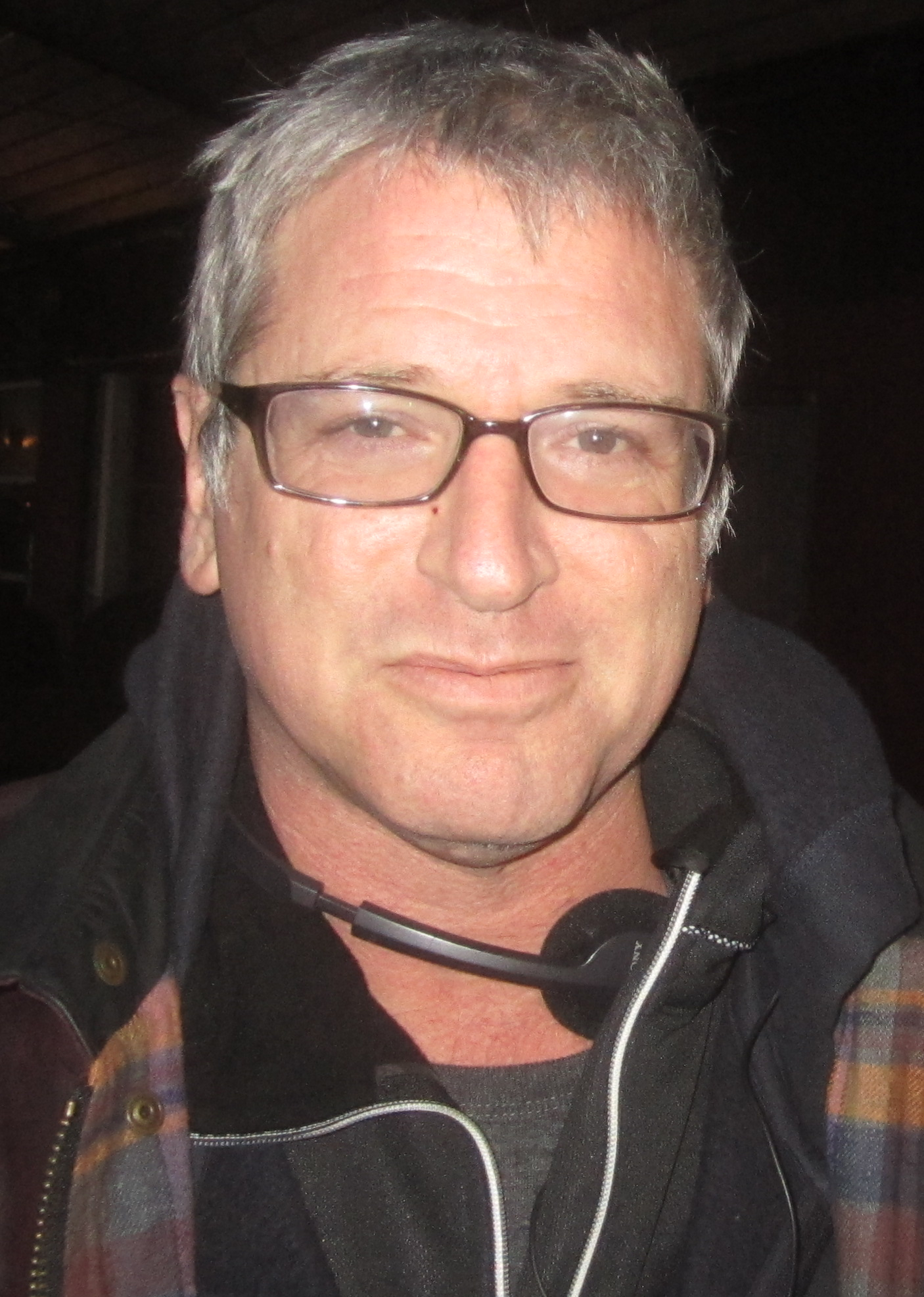
Michael Rymer (2011)

"33" was director Michael Rymer's first television episode. He accepted the job without reading the script, saying that based on his writing experience, "33" went well beyond his expectations and excited him. Bear McCreary originally composed the musical theme "Boomer Theme" for this episode; it was later expanded for use with the Athena character, before becoming the de facto "Hera Theme" for the character Hera Agathon in the fourth season episode, "Islanded in a Stream of Stars". Joel Ransom was the director of photography for the miniseries, but when Eick learned he was unavailable for the series, he turned to Stephen McNutt, with whom he had worked on American Gothic. In the interim, McNutt had moved on to shooting in high-definition video; this was fortuitous for the production team because, while Ransom had filmed the miniseries on 35 mm film, the production team was switching to high-definition video for the series.

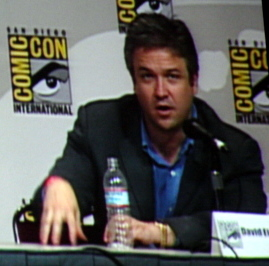
David Eick (2007)

Executive producer David Eick opined that "33" was the "silver bullet" that ultimately tipped the scales in their favor and convinced the Sci Fi Channel to pick up the series. The network's biggest concern in picking up the series was that Battlestar Galactica would fall victim to the same trappings of space opera as other television properties (Star Trek, Andromeda, Stargate). Two aspects that assuaged these concerns were specifically discussed in the episode's DVD commentary. First, "33" went into Gaius Baltar's (James Callis) mind and visited his house on Caprica (shot in Lions Bay, British Columbia); being swept away by the blue skies and beaches in his fantasy was not the sort of imagery expected of space opera-type shows. Second was going back to the devastated Caprica and following-up with Helo's (Tahmoh Penikett) story.

As sleep deprivation was a major plot point of the episode, actor Edward James Olmos (William Adama) liaised with an expert on the subject and the crew to best depict the actual effects realistically. Following up, director Michael Rymer gave each main cast member a specific symptom to emphasize to avoid repetition on screen. To aid a realistic portrayal, Olmos and several other cast members took their study a step further by restricting their sleep patterns to about three hours a night.

In the episode's DVD commentary, Moore and Rymer related how there were endless discussion about the clocks to feature in this episode. Concerns over digital versus analog, size and shape, the ratio of digital to analog clocks, whether they should run forwards or backwards, and whether any labels should be stenciled or hand-drawn were all brought up. David Eick also noted that as of the commentary's recording, the clock at Felix Gaeta's (Juliani) station still had its "33" label affixed.

=== Editing ===
The first cut of "33" was ten minutes too long. Despite this, the production crew took extra care not to eliminate "human moments" in their efforts to trim the episode. These included a shot of Galen Tyrol (Douglas) and Cally Henderson (Clyne) walking across Galactica's hangar bay, a shot of Crewman Socinus (Oyarzun) giving a bedraggled look over the shoulder of another crewmember, and a shot of PO2 Dualla (McClure) walking through Galactica's remembrance corridor.

Lest We Forget (left) and Raising the Flag at Ground Zero

In a question-and-answer session, Moore revealed a scene written for, but cut from, the episode. In the cut scene, the recurring prop in the characters' briefing room was to have been explicitly introduced and explained; the prop remained in the series, but its backstory was cut:

There was a scene cut from "33" where we saw Laura being given her copy of the photo along with a card that said it was taken on the roof of the capitol building on Aerilon during the attack. The photo was inspired by the famous shot of the fire-fighters raising the flag at Ground Zero that became iconic. I thought the Colonies would have their own version of this—a snapshot taken in the moment that becomes a symbol of the day they can never forget and of all they had lost. The photo itself is of a soldier falling to his knees (possibly shot or simply overcome by emotion) as he stands on the rooftop overlooking the devastation of his city, while the Colonial flag waves at the edge of frame. The inscription below the photo on Laura's plaque reads, "Lest We Forget" in itself a reference to the inscription on the watch presented to John Wayne's character in She Wore a Yellow Ribbon.

Other cut scenes included one shot in the pilots' head, showing the pilots "wrecked and exhausted [...] with an exchange between Starbuck and Apollo", as well as several shots of Commander Adama (Olmos) gagging and vomiting because of acid reflux brought on by sleep deprivation. A line of Olmos'—an ad-lib about suicides in the fleet—was cut so as not to alienate audiences by being "too dark".

As originally written and shot, when Apollo (Jamie Bamber) fires on Olympic Carrier, it was made clear that he sees people inside. Moore wrote the scene to be strong and clear that the characters were making the decision to fire on the passenger liner in full awareness of the consequences to illustrate and emphasize "the uncompromising nature of the show." This was an "enormous fight" between Moore and the network, with the latter feeling this was another scene that was "too dark" and had the potential to turn away audiences; the network further implied that if the scene were left intact, they may have been compelled to air the episodes out of order. To placate the network, Moore and Eick changed the ending of the episode and "cheated". Instead, when Apollo flies by other ship, it is unclear whether or not there is anybody inside. In a "small act of defiance", visual effects supervisor Gary Hutzel snuck in small, indeterminate movement behind one or two of Olympic Carrier's windows on behalf of the production and writing teams. The episode also originally ended with Helo's escape from the Cylons on Caprica; again tasked by the network to keep the episode from being "too dark", Moore wrote in an additional scene—President Roslin (Mary McDonnell) learning of the newborn—upon which to end the episode with a hopeful note.

== Release and reception ==
"33" first aired in the United Kingdom on October 18, 2004, and in the United States on January 14, 2005, almost three months later. UK viewers obliged US Battlestar Galactica fans by illegally copying the episode—via BitTorrent—within hours of its Sky One airing. By May 2009, "33" had been released thrice on home video as part of the first season collected sets; on July 26, 2005 as a Best Buy exclusive, again on September 20, 2005, and finally as an HD DVD set on December 4, 2007. The episode was also released on July 28, 2009 as part of the entire series' home video set on both DVD and Blu-ray.

Both series creator Ronald D. Moore and star Jamie Bamber (Lee Adama) claim "33" as their favorite episode. Bamber described it as "...the perfect episode of Battlestar Galactica." Emphasizing the dark, gritty, and nightmarish aspects of the episode, the actor felt it was a microcosm of the series as a whole. In interviews with Wired UK and the Los Angeles Times, Moore opined that the episode subverted viewers' expectations and was a "fantastic way to open that first year."

"33" won the 2005 Hugo Award for Best Dramatic Presentation, Short Form, and drew a 2.6 household Nielsen rating, attracting 3.1 million viewers and making it the number-two program on cable (8pm–11pm). At the website Television Without Pity, the staff review rated the episode an "A+", while (as of November 2010) 546 of their readers awarded it an average grade of "B". The New York Post's "10 Most Dramatic Moments of the '00s" included "33" in its #10 spot, describing it as the premiere episode of "a sci-fi show with high stakes and serious guts."
