= Act of Contrition (Battlestar Galactica) =

- Battlestar Galactica episode
- Episode no.: Season 1 Episode 4
- Directed by: Rod Hardy
- Written by: Bradley Thompson; David Weddle
- Original air dates: November 8, 2004 (UK); January 28, 2005 (US)

Guest appearances
- Lorena Gale as Priestess Elosha; Donnelly Rhodes as Sherman Cottle; Jill Teed as Sergeant Hadrian

Episode chronology
| ← Previous "Bastille Day" | Next → "You Can't Go Home Again" |
- Battlestar Galactica season 1

"Act of Contrition" is the fourth episode of the reimagined Battlestar Galactica television series.

== Plot ==
=== In the fleet ===
President Laura Roslin visits Galactica doctor Sherman Cottle about her cancer. Cottle determines that Roslin's cancer is far beyond surgical means of removal and suggests an aggressive chemotherapy-like treatment. Due to her mother's experiences with the treatment, Roslin refuses and decides to instead go on chamalla, an alternative means of treatment.

During a party for the 1,000th landing of a Raptor pilot named Flat Top, an accident occurs, killing thirteen pilots and injuring seven more. Needing pilots, Commander William Adama orders Starbuck, a former flight instructor, to train more pilots. Haunted by the memories of her fiancé Zak Adama whose death she feels responsible for, Starbuck is overly harsh on the pilots ("nuggets") and fails them after the first day.

While discussing the situation with his father, Apollo inadvertently reveals that Starbuck holds guilt about something to do with Zak's death. After Adama confronts her, Starbuck tearfully admits that though Zak failed basic flight, she passed him due to their engagement. As a result, he had a fatal accident that killed him. Adama angrily orders Starbuck to reinstate the nuggets and to get out his sight.

Following Adama's dressing down of her, Starbuck begins acting like an actual flight instructor, leaving her issues out of the cockpit. However, while on a flight with nuggets Hotdog, Kat and Chuckles, eight Cylon Raiders suddenly appear. As Galactica launches Vipers, Starbuck sends the nuggets back and attacks the Raiders alone in a sure suicide run, hoping to hold them off and allow the trainees to escape. Disobeying orders, Hotdog returns to help Starbuck fight off the Raiders, destroying one before his Viper is disabled.

During a dogfight with the last Raider, Starbuck is able to take it out with a shot to the "head." However, the Raider collides with Starbuck's Viper, sending both ships into the atmosphere of a nearby moon. With her Viper in a flat spin, Starbuck is forced to eject and falls towards the moon.

=== On Caprica ===
Twelve days after the fall of the Twelve Colonies, Helo and the copy of Boomer follow the signal they picked up to a restaurant. Underneath the restaurant, the two discover a fully stocked but abandoned fallout shelter. Helo and Sharon find an automated disaster beacon which is what led them to the shelter. Outside, a copy of Number Six looks into the restaurant, apparently knowing Helo and Sharon are inside, but continues on her way.

== Production ==
The show was the first written for the series by Star Trek: Deep Space Nine veterans Bradley Thompson and David Weddle. They were excited to use more complex flashback structures than in their previous television work. The accident plot was inspired by the accident on the USS Forrestal during the Vietnam War.

== Trivia ==
- Bodie Olmos, who plays Viper nugget Brendan "Hotdog" Constanza in this and future episodes, is the son of Edward James Olmos who plays Commander William Adama.
