= 33 minutes =

33 minutes might refer to:

- 33 Minutes, a 2009 film of The Heritage Foundation
- 33 (Battlestar Galactica), an episode of the 2004 TV series in which Cylons attack every 33 minutes
