= Bastille Day (Battlestar Galactica) =

- Battlestar Galactica episode
- Political radical Tom Zarek (Richard Hatch)
- Episode no.: Season 1 Episode 3
- Directed by: Allan Kroeker
- Written by: Toni Graphia
- Original air dates: November 1, 2004 (UK); January 21, 2005 (US)

Guest appearance
- Richard Hatch as Tom Zarek

Episode chronology
← Previous "Water"	Next → "Act of Contrition"
- Battlestar Galactica season 1

"Bastille Day" is the third episode of the first season of the reimagined Battlestar Galactica television series.

== Plot ==
=== In the fleet ===
Following the discovery of a new source of water, Chief Galen Tyrol and his teams determine that it is in the ice of a moon with an incredibly harsh climate. They determine that they will need a thousand men ideally to mine the water for usage in the fleet which is experiencing water riots due to the shortages.

Commander William Adama and Apollo suggest using the prisoners on the Astral Queen for the needed labor. The 1,500 men on the ship have been sentenced to hard labor and were on their way to parole hearings when the attacks occurred. Apollo suggests using incentives such as points towards their freedom to get the men to cooperate. Roslin agrees to use volunteers and assigns her Chief of Staff Billy Keikeya to help sort out which prisoners can be trusted and which cannot. At odds with Apollo, Adama decides to send someone he can trust to report to him on security matters. Due to his attraction to her, Billy suggests Petty Officer Anastasia "Dee" Dualla which is agreed to. Adama sends deck hand Cally along to make sure that the volunteers can actually use the needed equipment.

On the Astral Queen, Apollo makes his proposal, but no one steps forward. Finally, a man comes forward to reject Apollo's offer. Billy recognizes the man as Tom Zarek (Richard Hatch) an infamous political terrorist from Sagittaron. Billy's admiration of Zarek creates conflict between him and Dee who, while from the same colony, doesn't approve of Zarek's methods.

Apollo attempts to negotiate with Zarek for his help, having admired and respected Zarek for a long time. During the negotiations, the prisoners escape and riot with the help of a guard and take over the Astral Queen, taking the crew, Cally, Billy, Apollo and Dee hostage. Zarek then makes a broadcast to the fleet, demanding that Roslin and her ministers step down and free and open elections be held to elect a new government. Zarek argues his views with Apollo, stating that he doesn't see Roslin's presidency as legitimate due to her not being elected.

As the situation continues, Adama contacts Zarek in an attempt to defuse the situation while sending the marines and Starbuck to regain control of the Astral Queen and put an end to the situation. After Zarek refuses to listen to Adama and eagerly awaits the arrival of the Marines, Apollo realizes that Zarek really wants a bloodbath and to go out in a blaze of glory. Zarek reveals that his intentions are to become a martyr that will inspire the fleet to overthrow Roslin and Adama.

While Apollo and Zarek talk, a prisoner named Mason notices Cally's utter defiance of him. When Cally refuses to show him respect, Mason takes Cally to rape her. When Mason tries, Cally bites off part of his ear and Mason shoots and seriously wounds Cally. Though the commotion draws Zarek and Apollo to the scene, Zarek refuses to intervene, claiming that Mason's imprisonment turned him into a monster and "you reap what you sow." As Mason prepares to kill Cally, Apollo is able to overpower one of Zarek's men and use his gun to kill Mason.

As Starbuck and the marines arrive, Apollo gets Zarek at gunpoint but chooses not to kill him. Instead, Apollo acknowledges that Zarek is right about the freedom of law. Apollo offers Zarek a deal: in exchange for Zarek and his men helping to mine the water, they will give them their freedom and the Astral Queen. Apollo also promises to hold elections within a year. Zarek agrees and orders his men to stand down. Though Starbuck still tries to kill Zarek, Apollo saves his life.

In the aftermath, Apollo reminds Roslin and Adama that Roslin is only supposed to finish out the last seven months of President Adar's term and then hold elections. Apollo has only obligated Roslin to what she is legally obligated to do. The prisoners have been disarmed and left the Astral Queen and are now mining the water for the fleet. After Adama leaves, Roslin privately admits to having been diagnosed with cancer to Apollo who agrees to keep it a secret.

While the crisis goes on, Doctor Gaius Baltar is approached by Adama about his Cylon detector. While Baltar starts to claim that he can't make one, his internal Six prompts Baltar to tell Adama that he needs a nuclear warhead to complete his detector. Despite Galactica only having five left, Adama reluctantly agrees.

Due to the water shortage, Starbuck and Colonel Tigh both compensate by drinking alcohol and being inebriated on the job. While Tigh chastises Starbuck's behavior towards the pilots, he also backs her up with Adama, causing Starbuck to attempt to reach out to him by sharing some of the newly mined water. Tigh rejects the gesture however.

Boomer continues to be nervous about the potential of her being a Cylon sleeper agent. Tyrol reassures Boomer that the master-at-arms investigation into the bombing has turned up no clues pointing towards Boomer as the bomber. Catching the two in an embrace, Colonel Tigh privately tells Boomer that the entire ship knows about their relationship which is against military regulations. However, while it was ignored while Galactica was in the process of being decommissioned, they are now in a combat situation and Tigh orders Boomer to put a stop to it. Boomer agrees to do so.

=== On Caprica ===
On Caprica 12 days after the Fall, Helo and the Boomer copy make their way through a deserted city with only two days of anti-radiation medication left to them. The two intend to locate a hospital to find more medication, but come across rats feasting on a corpse, disturbing Sharon. Helo reassures her that they will "make it all the way" and suggests that someone must be watching over them.

Unnoticed by Helo or Sharon, they are observed by a copy of Number Six and Aaron Doral. The two comment on Sharon's skill while the Six expresses sadness at the destruction surrounding them. While Six feels that humanity is their parents in a sense, Doral tells her that parents must die in order for children to come into their own.

== Original series connection ==
Richard Hatch, who plays prisoner Tom Zarek in this and future episodes, was the actor who played Captain Apollo in the original 1978 series.

== Reception ==
The A.V. Club commented that some of the scenes were fantastic and it the episode was "interesting to examine".

Den of Geek called it a weak episode.
