= Pickle Productions =

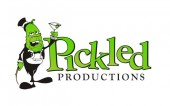
Pickled Productions logo

Pickled Productions, also known as "I'm A Little Pickled Theatre Company", was a theatre society in Vancouver, BC, Canada. It was founded in 2001 and closed in 2008. Its primary focus was to produce work that was rarely being performed.

== Production list ==
- Wild Abandon by Daniel MacIvor (3 production runs)
- Scooter Thomas Makes It To The Top of The World by Peter Parnell
- Falling Man by Will Scheffer
- Six Degrees of Separation by John Guare
- Vampire Lesbians of Sodom by Charles Busch
- Off To See The Wizard by Randie Parliament
- See Bob Run by Daniel MacIvor
- The Soldier Dreams by Daniel MacIvor
- The Book of Liz by David Sedaris & Amy Sedaris
- Hedwig And The Angry Inch by John Cameron Mitchell
- Debbie Does Dallas - The Musical by Andrew Sherman, Tom Kitt, Jonathan Callicutt & Susan L. Schwartz

== Players ==
- Randie Parliament, founder / co-artistic director
- April Merrick, co-artistic director
- Brenda Matthews, artistic producer
- Laura Leone Hancock, artistic producer
- Giles Panton, artistic producer

== Awards and nominations ==
CTC AWARDS

2008 Debbie Does Dallas - The Musical

- Best Actress in a Musical, Jamie Robinson (Debbie)
- Best Supporting Actress, Claire Lindsay (Tammy)

2007 Hedwig And The Angry Inch

- Best Production, Randie Parliament (Producer)
- Best Actor in a Musical, Seth Drabinsky (Hedwig)
- Best Supporting Actress, Cathy Salmond (Yitzak)
- Best Supporting Actor, Edmonton Block Heater
- Best Musical Director, Mark Reid
- Best Sound Design, Mark Reid & Ross Smith

2006 The Soldier Dreams

- Best Production, Randie Parliament (Producer)
- Best Actress, Christina Schild (Tish)
- Best Lighting Design, Josh Hallem

2006 The Book of Liz, written by David Sedaris and Amy Sedaris

- Best Actress, Brenda Matthews (Liz) - Winner!
- Best Supporting Actress, April Merrick
- Best Supporting Actor, Giles Panton - Winner!
- Best Director, Penelope Corrin

2006 Wild Abandon

- Best Actor, Randie Parliament (Steve)

OVATION AWARDS

2007 Hedwig And The Angry Inch

- Best Production, Randie Parliament (Producer)
- Best Actor, Seth Drabinsky - Winner
- Best Supporting Actress, Cathy Salmond - Winner

2007 Debbie Does Dallas - The Musical

- Best Actress, Jamie Robinson - Winner
- Best Supporting Actress, Claire Lindsay
- Best Choreography, Jason Franco - Winner
