= Christina Schild =

Austrian-born Canadian actress

- Born: Vienna, Austria
- Occupation: Actor

Christina Schild is an Austrian-born Canadian actress.

== Biography ==
She was born in Vienna, Austria and has one sister. Holds a graduate degree in actor training from the American Academy of Dramatic Arts in New York City. Schild portrays Playa Palacios in Battlestar Galactica.

== Roles ==
=== Film/Television ===
- Stargate Universe - Andrea Palmer
- Alien Trespass - Darlene
- Battlestar Galactica - Playa Palacios
- Smallville
- The L Word - Lassoed
- 21 Jump Street - Donna

=== Theatre ===
- Poor Super Man - Kryla
- An Ideal Husband - Mrs. Cheveley
- Titus Andronicus - Emellius
- Hay Fever - Myra
- Don't Dress For Dinner - Suzanne
- Julius Caesar - Pindarus
- A Soldier Dreams - Tish (Pickled Productions)
- School Inc. - Suzanne
- Jeffrey - Debra
