= Bradley Thompson =

American television writer and producer

Bradley Thompson is an American television writer and producer known for episodes of Star Trek: Deep Space Nine (1996–1999), The Twilight Zone (2002–2003), Battlestar Galactica (2004–2009), CSI: Crime Scene Investigation (2009-2011), Falling Skies (2011-2013), and The Strain (2014-2017) with writing partner David Weddle. They are currently writing for the series For All Mankind, which debuted on Apple TV+ on November 1, 2019. They also wrote for the short-lived series Ghost Stories (1997) and The Fearing Mind (2000).

== Biography ==
Thompson graduated from the USC School of Cinema, as did writing partner David Weddle, whom he originally met in an acting class. Weddle and Thompson first pitched stories for Deep Space Nine at Paramount Pictures. In 1995, the two joined the writing staff for DS9's final four seasons, crafting 12 episodes. On the series, they worked with producer Ronald D. Moore, who hired them for Battlestar Galactica in 2004.

Together with Weddle, Thompson served as a story editor on the first season of Battlestar Galactica, and they became co-producers in the second season. Their responsibilities as producers increased during the third season, and they achieved supervising producer status for the fourth season. They wrote a total of 15 episodes for BSG.

In 2008, Thompson and Weddle joined the staff of CSI: Las Vegas mid-way through Season 9 as writers and supervising producers. In Season 10, they became co-executive producers, writing nine episodes in all over three seasons. An episode they wrote for the 11th season, "Fracked", won the Environmental Media Association's 21st Annual Environmental Media Award for Television Episodic Drama.

In 2011, they joined the writing staff for the second season of the Steven Spielberg alien-invasion drama Falling Skies on TNT. In 2012, they acted as co-executive producers for the TV movie Battlestar Galactica: Blood & Chrome and the pilot for the TV series Defiance, both on Syfy. In 2013 they began writing for the first season of an FX adaptation of The Strain, a horror novel by Guillermo del Toro and Chuck Hogan, which concluded with the fourth season in 2017. They were two of the series' eight executive producers.

In 2018, Thompson and Weddle re-teamed with Ron Moore, with whom they had worked on Battlestar Galactica, to write for the Apple TV+ series For All Mankind. They are two of the co-executive producers on the show.

== Credits ==
=== Star Trek: Deep Space Nine ===
- "Rules of Engagement"
- "The Assignment"
- "Business as Usual"
- "Sons and Daughters"
- "One Little Ship"
- "Inquisition"
- "The Reckoning"
- "Time's Orphan"
- "Treachery, Faith, and the Great River"
- "Prodigal Daughter"
- "'Til Death Do Us Part"
- "Extreme Measures"

=== Ghost Stories ===
- "Back Ward"
- "Beware the Muse"

=== The Fearing Mind ===
- "Upgrades"
- "Call of the Wild"
- "Maximum Security" (originally unaired)
- "On the Road" (originally unaired)

=== The Twilight Zone ===
- "Harsh Mistress"
- "Fair Warning"
- "Homecoming"

=== Battlestar Galactica ===
- "Act of Contrition"
- "The Hand of God"
- "Scattered"
- "Valley of Darkness"
- "Flight of the Phoenix"
- "Scar"
- "Downloaded"
- "Exodus, Parts 1 and 2"
- "Rapture"
- "Maelstrom"
- "He That Believeth in Me"
- "Revelations"
- "Sometimes a Great Notion"
- "Someone to Watch Over Me"

=== CSI: Crime Scene Investigation ===
- "The Grave Shift"
- "Kill Me If You Can"
- "A Space Oddity"
- "Family Affair"
- "The Lost Girls"
- "Irradiator"
- "Shock Waves"
- "Fracked"
- "Targets of Obsession"

=== Falling Skies ===
- "Shall We Gather at the River"
- "Molon Labe"
- "A More Perfect Union"
- "Collateral Damage"
- "Be Silent and Come Out"
- "Journey to Xilbalba"
- "Saturday Night Massacre"

=== The Strain ===
- "The Box"
- "For Services Rendered"
- "Last Rites"
- "By Any Means"
- "Intruders"
- "Fallen Light"
- "Bad White"
- "The Battle of Central Park"
- "Do or Die"

=== For All Mankind ===
- "Into the Abyss"
- "Bent Bird"
- "Pathfinder"
- "Triage"
- "Game Changer"
- "Coming Home"
- "Have a Nice Sol"
- "Legacy"
- "Brazil"

=== Video games ===
- Aliens: Colonial Marines
