= David Weddle =

American television writer and producer

David Weddle is an American television writer and producer known for episodes of Star Trek: Deep Space Nine (1996–1999), The Twilight Zone (2002–2003), Battlestar Galactica (2004–2009), CSI: Crime Scene Investigation (2009-2011), Falling Skies (2011-2013), and The Strain (2014-2017) with writing partner Bradley Thompson. They are currently writing for the series For All Mankind, which debuted on Apple TV+ on November 1, 2019. They also wrote for the short-lived series Ghost Stories (1997) and The Fearing Mind (2000).

== Biography ==
Weddle graduated from the USC School of Cinema, as did writing partner Bradley Thompson, whom he first met in an acting class.

David Weddle reached out to comedian Marty Feldman and they collaborated on a script about Feldman's idol Buster Keaton. A UK published biography of Feldman makes note of “his mentoring of an eternally appreciative David Weddle, who has gone on to write and produce episodes of Deep Space Nine, Battlestar Galactica, and CSI.”

After Sam Peckinpah's death in 1984, Weddle used Peckinpah's production files and correspondence that had been given to the library of the Academy of Motion Picture Arts and Sciences to write a biography of the director. This biography, If They Move... Kill 'Em!: The Life and Times of Sam Peckinpah was released in 1994.

It was this biography that brought Weddle to Deep Space Nine and later to Battlestar Galactica. Ira Steven Behr invited Weddle to Paramount Pictures. This enabled Weddle and Thompson to pitch stories to the show. The two joined the writing staff for DS9's final seasons. They also met and worked with producer Ronald D. Moore on the show.

Weddle and Thompson wrote twelve episodes of Deep Space Nine. Weddle can be seen in the background of the scene set at Vic Fontaine's Lounge in the final episode, "What You Leave Behind". He later wrote a DS9 novel set after the series with Jeffrey Lang. Entitled "Abyss", it focused on Section 31, the Federation's secretive intelligence service.

Weddle considers "Inquisition" to be the best Star Trek episode he and Bradley Thompson wrote, for showing "that the Federation, as perfect as it seemed, had to resort to unsavory tactics and work black bag operations to keep their world safe and pristine".

Weddle and Thompson were invited by Ron Moore to work on the reimagined Battlestar Galactica. They served as story editors on the first season of the show and became co-producers in the second season. Their responsibilities as producers increased during the third season, and they achieved supervising producer status for the fourth season. During the fourth season, however, Weddle stated that he felt the story didn't adhere to the structure detailed in Aristotle's Poetics, and was thus "too difficult to follow."

On the 2006 Special Edition DVD release of San Peckinpah's 1969 film The Wild Bunch, Weddle is part of a group of Peckinpah scholars who provide the commentary track. Weddle describes a 2004 pilgrimage to Parras, Mexico, one of the locations for the film's production.

In 2008, Weddle and Thompson joined the staff of CSI: Las Vegas midway through Season 9 as writers and supervising producers. As of Season 10, they became co-executive producers. An episode they wrote for the 11th season, "Fracked", won the Environmental Media Association's 21st Annual Environmental Media Award for Television Episodic Drama.

In 2011, Weddle and Thompson joined the writing staff for the second season of the Steven Spielberg alien-invasion drama Falling Skies on TNT. In 2012, they acted as co-executive producers for the TV movie Battlestar Galactica: Blood & Chrome and the pilot for the TV series Defiance, both on Syfy, and in 2013 they began writing for the first season of an FX adaptation of The Strain, a horror novel by Guillermo del Toro and Chuck Hogan, which concluded with the fourth season in 2017. They were two of the series' eight executive producers.

In 2018, Thompson and Weddle re-teamed with Ron Moore, with whom they had worked on Battlestar Galactica, to write for the Apple TV+ series For All Mankind. They are two of the co-executive producers on the show.

== Credits ==
=== Star Trek: Deep Space Nine ===
- "Rules of Engagement"
- "The Assignment"
- "Business as Usual"
- "Sons and Daughters"
- "One Little Ship"
- "Inquisition"
- "The Reckoning"
- "Time's Orphan"
- "Treachery, Faith, and the Great River"
- "Prodigal Daughter"
- "'Til Death Do Us Part"
- "Extreme Measures"

=== Ghost Stories ===
- "Back Ward"
- "Beware the Muse"

=== The Fearing Mind ===
- "Upgrades"
- "Call of the Wild"
- "Maximum Security" (originally unaired)
- "On the Road" (originally unaired)

=== The Twilight Zone ===
- "Harsh Mistress"
- "Fair Warning"
- "Homecoming"

=== Battlestar Galactica ===
- "Act of Contrition"
- "The Hand of God"
- "Scattered"
- "Valley of Darkness"
- "Flight of the Phoenix"
- "Scar"
- "Downloaded"
- "Exodus"
- "Rapture"
- "Maelstrom"
- "He That Believeth in Me"
- "Revelations"
- "Sometimes a Great Notion"
- "Someone to Watch Over Me"

=== CSI: Crime Scene Investigation ===
- "The Grave Shift"
- "Kill Me If You Can"
- "A Space Oddity"
- "Family Affair"
- "The Lost Girls"
- "Irradiator"
- "Shock Waves"
- "Fracked"
- "Targets of Obsession"

=== Falling Skies ===
- "Shall We Gather at the River"
- "Molon Labe"
- "A More Perfect Union"
- "Collateral Damage"
- "Be Silent and Come Out"
- "Journey to Xilbalba"
- "Saturday Night Massacre"

=== The Strain ===
- "The Box"
- "For Services Rendered"
- "Last Rites"
- "By Any Means"
- "Intruders"
- "Fallen Light"
- "Bad White"
- "The Battle of Central Park"
- "Do or Die"

=== For All Mankind ===
- "Into the Abyss"
- "Bent Bird"
- "Pathfinder"
- "Triage"
- "Game Changer"
- "Coming Home"
- "Have a Nice Sol"
- "Legacy"
- "Brazil"

=== Video games ===
- Aliens: Colonial Marines

=== Nonfiction ===
- "If They Move... Kill 'Em!": The Life and Times of Sam Peckinpah, a 1994 biography of noted film director Sam Peckinpah
