= Gaius Baltar =

Character in Battlestar Galactica (2004)

- Battlestar Galactica character
- James Callis as Gaius Baltar
- First appearance: "Miniseries"
- Last appearance: "Daybreak (Part 3)"
- Portrayed by: James Callis

In-universe information
- Species: Human
- Gender: Male
- Occupation: Computer Scientist specializing in Artificial Intelligence (Miniseries); Science Advisor to Laura Roslin (Miniseries-Episode 1.11); Caprica delegate to the Quorum of Twelve (Episode 1.11); Vice President of the Twelve Colonies of Kobol (Episode 1.11–2.20); President of the Twelve Colonies of Kobol (Episode 2.20–3.04); Cult Leader (Episode 4.03-Episode 4.20); Marine on board Galactica (Episode 4.20)
- Colony: Born and Raised on Aerilon, relocated to Caprica

Dr. Gaius Baltar is a fictional character in the TV series Battlestar Galactica played by James Callis, a reimagining of Lord Baltar from the 1978 Battlestar Galactica series. He is one of the show's primary characters.

== Personality ==
Gaius Baltar regularly uses a well-developed acting talent to spin yarns on virtually any subject when he feels the need. He possesses a dry, cynical sense of humour but is prone to bouts of neurosis. A charismatic genius and womanizer, he is initially portrayed as a self-serving opportunist, but becomes a braver and more caring character over the course of the series, expressing regret for having been "a profoundly selfish man." Baltar is initially an atheist, but ultimately converts to the Cylons' monotheistic religion. Baltar is described as "weak", "arrogant" and "a coward" by Lee Adama while Caprica Six describes Baltar as "narcissistic, self-centered, feckless and vain." William Adama once indicated that Baltar consistently sees himself as a "victim," allowing him to escape responsibility for his guilt. Later in the series, his most profound changes begin during his adoption (against his will) as a religious figure, and he begins demonstrating increased compassion and bravery. His eventual self-awareness, love for Caprica Six, and compassion for the Agathons also motivate him to humble himself, serving in the Colonial Fleet during Hera's rescue mission and eventually choosing a quiet life as a farmer.

== Character biography ==
=== Early life ===
Gaius Baltar claims to be from the colony of Aerilon, and that at the age of ten, finding the Aerilonian dialect to be detrimental to his career dreams, he trained himself to speak the Caprican dialect in hopes of one day being considered a citizen of one of the more respected and wealthy colonies such as Caprica. He also has a very troubled relationship with his father.

=== The destruction of the Twelve Colonies ===
At the onset of the show, he is involved in a sexual relationship with a blonde woman. Believing her to be working for a corporation in the defense industry, and desiring a more permanent relationship with her, he gives her access to the highly classified Colonial defense mainframe (an act of treason punishable by the death penalty) so her employers can have an advantage in future contract bidding. In exchange for his access to the government mainframe, she helps him design a navigation program used by Colonial warships, covertly creating backdoors in the program. When the Cylons attack the Twelve Colonies of Kobol, they use those backdoors to penetrate software security firewalls, disabling entire fighter squadrons outright and sabotaging vital capital-ship systems. On the day the Cylons attack humanity, the woman reveals she is an advanced Cylon, model Number Six (later known as Caprica Six), and she used the information that Baltar gave her to shut down the Colonial defenses, thus making him responsible for the Cylons' successful genocidal campaign against the Twelve Colonies. Baltar manages to survive the nuclear explosion that destroys his home due to Caprica Six using her body to shield him.

As a result of the nuclear blast, Number Six is killed, and as a Cylon her memories are automatically "downloaded" during the blast to be later resurrected, as revealed in later episodes. For the duration of the series, Baltar is haunted by a version of Six only he can see. This woman toys with alternate explanations for her existence, from a Cylon chip in his brain sending signals, to an hallucination created out of guilt over the attacks, and thirdly to her being an Angel sent by God to watch over him, and Baltar finally assumes the latter following a medical checkup and rationalising that her extraordinary information to solve problems cannot simply be his own mind.

Having unintentionally brought about the near-annihilation of the human species, Baltar flees Caprica when Karl Agathon gives up his place on a Raptor, feeling that his own life is less important to save than a famed scientist's. The Raptor returns to the Battlestar Galactica, where Baltar attempts to endear himself to Laura Roslin, the new President of the remnants of the Twelve Colonies, and hopes to conceal his involvement in the genocide that has taken place.

=== Scientist for the Fleet ===
Once a part of the fleet, Baltar is haunted by visions of Number Six, with whom he converses often (cf. Head Six). It is unclear to Baltar whether these projections are from a chip Number Six implanted in his brain while they were together on Caprica (the explanation originally given by the Number Six vision, which she later disclaimed) or if she is simply a manifestation of Baltar's own mind. Although the vision of Number Six manipulates Baltar through his fear of discovery, she lends him an edge by granting him knowledge of situations. The model of Number Six who had seduced him on Caprica later experiences similar visions after her consciousness was downloaded into a new body. Whereas Baltar experienced visions of her, she experienced visions of him. Both visions acted in similar ways: they were seemingly crueler than the person they were based on and often manipulated the affected party against his or her own species.

Shortly after Baltar comes on board Galactica, Head Six reveals that a device that he had previously seen in possession of Six on Caprica has been surreptitiously installed in Galactica's Combat Information Center (CIC) (the command and control center of the battlestar). Head Six tells him it wasn't her job to put it in there. Baltar realizes there is a Cylon on board Galactica, but knows he cannot reveal that information, or indicate the device is not a part of the ship without implicating himself in the destruction of the Colonies. Baltar decides to implicate a person on board who goes by Aaron Doral because he is a civilian who has had access to the CIC during the last several weeks and, as an outsider, would be more likely to not be trusted by the Galactica crew. Having already been put in charge of testing the fleet for Cylons, Baltar informs the Executive Officer that he discreetly collected hair samples of crew members and has found Doral is a Cylon. Baltar, however, had no method at the time for testing for Cylons in the fleet. Baltar also explains he saw Doral doing something with a strange-looking device in the CIC he does not recognize. This forces him to develop an actual method for testing the fleet for Cylons, having already "demonstrated" an ability to do so. The process he eventually creates is reliable and is done through the testing of blood samples, but is time-consuming (it takes 11 hours to test one person).

In the episode "Six Degrees of Separation", Baltar is accused of being a traitor to the human race when a flesh-and-blood Number Six (after Baltar and Head Six have a heated argument over whether or not God exists) produces photographic evidence showing that Baltar carried an explosive device into the Colonial Defense Mainframe on Caprica, allowing the Cylons to carry out their nuclear attack. When it is found the evidence is fake, President Roslin holds a press conference publicly exonerating Baltar. Head Six tells him his public position is now stronger than ever since he has been accused of a serious crime and found innocent, and even possibly been the target of a Cylon plot. Meanwhile, the real-life Six disappears from Galactica and is nowhere to be found.

In the episode "The Hand of God", Baltar successfully helps the fleet destroy a Cylon mining base on an asteroid with badly needed tylium ores for fueling the fleet. The planners of the attack ask Baltar to point out where the best target for a bomb run is on a recon photo, even though he has no idea what it looks like. In his mind, Baltar asks Head Six for help, but she tells him it is in God's hands and He will 'tell' Baltar where to point. Baltar then points to one of the buildings of the base, simply as a wild guess. Much to Baltar's surprise, his guess was correct. Baltar comes to believe the only logical explanation is that God guided his hand.

=== Vice-Presidency ===
In the episode "Colonial Day", Baltar, now Caprica's representative to the Quorum of Twelve, is elected vice-president with Roslin's support. In the episode "Home, Part II", Baltar undergoes a brain scan that reveals no sign of a computer chip. He realizes his vision of Number Six could not be a hallucination, as she is aware of facts he could not possibly know. She tells him the first Human/Cylon Hybrid will be born in the ship's brig; soon, the Caprican version of the Cylon Sharon Valerii (pregnant with the human Karl Agathon's child) is imprisoned in it. When Baltar confronts Six with this, she simply replies she is "an angel of God sent here to protect you, to guide you, and to love you". Head Six later persuades Baltar to give a nuclear warhead to a pacifist movement. Admiral William Adama had given the nuclear warhead to Baltar in an earlier episode for use in constructing a Cylon detector.

Baltar proceeds to run for president against Roslin. He is far behind Roslin in the polls when a habitable planet is accidentally discovered in a region of space where heavy electromagnetic interference makes long-range observation difficult. Baltar announces that he will begin immediate civilian settlement of New Caprica if elected. Due to his support for settlement of New Caprica, the election promptly swings in Baltar's favor and he is sworn in as president. During the inauguration itself, the nuclear warhead Baltar gave up destroys a luxury liner. Following this apparent act of Cylon terrorism, Admiral Adama urges Baltar to focus immediately on internal security and investigate how a Cylon agent could have carried out the bombing. Baltar refuses, however, and proceeds with plans for settlement.

=== Presidency ===
After one year, life on New Caprica is extremely difficult, with the civilian population living in rough conditions and shortages of basic supplies like antibiotics persisting. A Cylon fleet arrives in orbit of New Caprica and the remaining military fleet jumps away. A Cylon delegation accepts Baltar's surrender. When Baltar asks how the Cylons managed to detect New Caprica, it is revealed they were a light-year away when they detected the light and radiation from the nuclear explosion Gina set off the year before. Baltar continues to hold the office of the Presidency, but only as a figurehead. Compounding his alienation to his people, he was forced at gunpoint to sign an execution order for hundreds of humans. Throughout the occupation of New Caprica, Baltar tried to persuade the Cylons their mission to rule over the human race could not succeed and they should leave the planet. When the Colonials evacuate New Caprica, Baltar and Caprica-Six discover Hera, the child of Sharon "Athena" Agathon whom Head Six predicted would be born in Galactica's Brig. Baltar's rescue of the child helps him convince the Cylons to make him a member of their fleet.

=== Life among the Cylons ===
In the episode "Collaborators", we find Baltar living on a Cylon Basestar in a barless cell. Caprica-Six informs Baltar she has had a change of heart about him and has let her feelings for him cloud her judgment, presumably ending their relationship. By the end of the episode, however, it is indicated she has cast the tie-breaking vote amongst the Cylons to allow Baltar to remain alive aboard the Cylon Basestar, though it is clear they remain estranged. Over time, Baltar becomes accustomed to his new environment. Once Baltar learns that no one knows what the "Final Five" Cylons look like, he begins to suspect that he himself may be a Cylon. He admits that this is wishful thinking on his part, because of his desire to have all his 'sins' forgiven and become a hero to another people.

Towards the end of Baltar's stay with the Cylons, he grows much closer to D'Anna, who has become obsessed with finding the identities of the "Final Five" Cylons. Pondering if he himself is a Cylon, Baltar brushes Caprica-Six aside and aligns with D'Anna. Together, in the episodes "Eye of Jupiter" and "Rapture", Baltar and the Three models defy the other Cylon models and he and D'Anna travel to the surface of an algae planet in search for an ancient ruined temple. Three believed the temple would show her the identities of the Final Five. D'Anna appears to see the Final Five, but collapses and swiftly dies before she can tell Baltar if he is a Cylon or not. Hoping to retrigger the vision, Baltar steps onto the platform D'Anna used, when Chief Tyrol gets the drop on Baltar and knocks him out. The ex-president is then transported back to Galactica in a body bag and sent to the brig.

=== Trial ===
Baltar is subjected to a hallucinogen-based interrogation by Admiral Adama about any involvement with the Cylons. Baltar admits his unwitting complicity in the original Cylon attack on the Colonies, though without any specifics. Meanwhile, Baltar smuggles writings out of his cell through his lawyer, which are published in a memoir, My Triumphs, My Mistakes. In the book, Baltar attempts to explain his actions as president to the public and foment class warfare by describing the fleet as a bifurcated society, accusing the elite upper class of militarism and professional civilians of exploiting the less well-educated working class. While the book is not completed at the end of Season 3 (President Roslin confiscates several sections through repeated searches of Baltar's cell), it becomes very popular among certain segments of the fleet populace (despite Roslin's repeated attempts to suppress its distribution), including workers on the tylium refinery ship and Chief Tyrol's flight-deck maintenance crew, as well as his wife Cally Tyrol. Despite the labor difficulties Baltar experienced with Tyrol on New Caprica, the book's popularity leads to Tyrol calling a general strike and exacerbates the fleet's already strained social order.

As his trial proceeds, Baltar's first lawyer is killed in an explosion aboard a sabotaged Raptor. His second attorney, Romo Lampkin, survives a similar attempt on his life. Lee Adama (now Lampkin's security adjutant) then joins Baltar's defense team. The trial is unfair, and includes witness Felix Gaeta deliberately lying to ensure a guilty verdict. Baltar rejects his defense team's suggestion to demand a mistrial saying, "there will be a verdict". The defense team uses the very end of the trial to try to persuade the jury that Baltar is guilty only of being a scapegoat for the Cylon occupation. Lee Adama also mentions the fleet has forgiven numerous other persons for their mistakes because they have had to in order to ensure their survival. Baltar is found not guilty for his crimes by a 3–2 vote, with Admiral Adama casting a vote in Baltar's favor. Roslin is disgusted that Baltar is now free as she still truly believes he was involved in sabotaging the colonial defenses in the attack. After Baltar is freed from prison, his defense team abandons him.

=== Return to civilian life ===
Shortly before the Cylon fleet attacks at the Ionian Nebula, Baltar is led to safety by three female followers of his work, one of whom had asked him to bless her sick child before his trial. He is received warmly by a group (with mostly female members) that has erected a shrine to him in an unused compartment of Galactica. Baltar quickly learns he has nowhere to go and must stay on the ship. Under the direction of Head Six, Baltar spreads monotheistic beliefs among the group. After his following on Galactica is attacked by a polytheism group, Baltar (with the encouragement of his Head Six) disrupts a religious ceremony of one of the polytheist denominations in the fleet. Later, Roslin meets with the imprisoned Baltar to pressure him to stop causing trouble. After his release, Baltar is prevented from entering his home by a Galactica marine under new legislation approved by the President. The legislation restricts the right to assembly of Baltar's movement. Under the direction of Head Six, Baltar keeps attempting to re-enter his home and is subjected to blows from a marine. Head Six is shown lifting Baltar to his feet; a camera point of view shot pans across a couple views showing Baltar's view and then the view of the action in the context of everyone else present. While we see Baltar's perspective, everyone sees a limp Baltar rising upright. Their expressions suggest a supernatural experience. Lee Adama arrives to inform Baltar the Quorum of Twelve has overruled the President and revoked the new law. Baltar goes on to preach God loves all humans regardless of their sin because everyone is perfect as they are. Baltar begins illegal wireless broadcasts of his religious speeches and his popularity grows.

Shortly after the Baltar situation, Kara Thrace informs President Roslin, whose cancer has returned, that the Cylon Hybrid on the captured rebel Cylon Basestar referred to a "dying leader" learning the "truth of the opera house"—the setting of the dreams Roslin shares with Caprica-Six and Athena. As Baltar's popularity increases, he chooses to inform the fleet of Roslin sharing her visions with both of the long-time Cylons in the fleet. Although this development distressed Roslin, she decides to bring Baltar with her (along with Karl Agathon—Athena's husband) to the Cylon Basestar to see the Hybrid. She informs Baltar that she chose to do this because she sees him in the dreams she shares with Caprica-Six and Athena. The Basestar jumps away from the fleet the moment the Hybrid is reactivated to begin a series of jumps to reach the Cylon Resurrection Hub, leaving Baltar once again away from the fleet aboard a Cylon ship. When the Basestar jumps away from the Colonial Fleet, Roslin begins to have a series of visions involving Elosha, a deceased priestess. Baltar and Roslin try to question the Hybrid; during an attack on the Cylon Resurrection Hub, Baltar is injured. After he is influenced by morpha administered by Roslin, Baltar reveals the details of his involvement in the attack on the Colonies. Roslin decides to leave Baltar's injuries untreated, letting him bleed to death. The Basestar jumps again and Roslin's vision of Elosha on Galactica culminates in an extended discourse on the need to respect the rights of the living. Afterwards, Roslin tries to save Baltar's life; he recovers and is reunited with D'Anna. Later, Baltar thanks Roslin for choosing not to murder him.

=== Cooperation with Colonial government ===
Following the discovery of a devastated planet Earth and Admiral Adama's support for a permanent alliance with the rebel Cylons, Zarek and Felix Gaeta lead a mutiny on Galactica. President Roslin goes to Baltar to ask if she can use his wireless transmitter to speak to the fleet and urge them to support the legitimate government. After Roslin speaks to the fleet, she and Baltar flee to the rebel Baseship while they wait out the conflict. After order is restored on Galactica, Baltar returns to his following to find that its numbers have dwindled and are now under the de facto leadership of Paula (although some appear to remain loyal to Baltar). During the mutiny, the Monotheists were attacked by mutineers; afterwards, the Monotheists comb the ship for weapons and food to hoard. Baltar attempts to reclaim leadership when the Monotheists take him to Dogsville. Baltar insists to his followers they give away all their food. The armed group that had attacked Baltar's followers arrives and steals the remaining food. Head Six insists that Baltar try to persuade his followers there is a way to feed them and everyone else. After Baltar wins over everyone except Paula, Head Six tells him, "We can get guns." Baltar promises his following that he will arm them. Baltar asks for weapons from Adama, arguing that Galactica is slowly slipping away from Adama and that eventually he will maintain order by giving civilians weapons or bring Cylon Centurions to the ship. Insisting that the fleet would not accept Centurions on Galactica, Baltar manages to persuade Adama to agree that his religious group is the only viable option for maintaining order, cementing Baltar's leadership.

=== Arrival at Earth ===
When the last Raptor leaves Galactica with Paula, Baltar stays on Galactica to finally do something noble. He is issued a rifle and made part of Galactica's reserve force, with Caprica Six. The "Head Baltar" only seen by Caprica Six and the Head Six seen only by Baltar then appear to them and they realize they can see both of them. During the assault on the Cylon colony ship, Baltar and Caprica Six defend Galactica from Cylon Centurions: Baltar performs well, killing at least one Centurion; in a bout of over-enthusiasm nearly shoots the returning rescue team before he is stopped by Caprica Six. The two later find Hera, who is running away in a manner that fulfils the Opera House vision (with Galactica substituted for the Opera House). They carry her through the ship to the Opera House and enter it to find themselves in Galactica's CIC with the Final Five in similar positions as they were in the vision. Cavil takes Hera hostage but Baltar tries to talk him down attempting to convince him to end the cycle of violence; in a rare moment of complete sincerity, Baltar confesses that his atheism has given way to the possibility of unexplainable, supernatural influence. Baltar's speech causes Cavil to falter and finally gives in when Colonel Tigh offers him resurrection in return for Hera and leaving humanity alone for good.

=== Coda ===
Baltar is part of the survey crew that discovers a primitive version of humanity that evolved on the planet (which the Colonials later name Earth) and says they can have children with the Colonials and humanoid Cylons. As the Colonials and human Cylons depart, Baltar and Caprica Six discuss the possibility of becoming farmers; Baltar indicates that he is ready to accept the life and is finally at peace with the idea of following in his father's footsteps. Later, while observing Hera with Caprica Six, Baltar and Caprica Six receive a final visit from their ethereal counterparts. They reveal that Baltar and Caprica have fulfilled their role in God's plan. The ethereal Beings disappear for the last time, then appear on modern Earth 150,000 years later.

== Reception ==
The Independent included Baltar on their list of the 35 greatest TV villains.

Armando Iannucci praised the show and the characters, particularly "a hugely complicated, pathetic, funny and devious bad guy in Gaius Baltar, one of the most fallible villains ever screened."

In 2005 James Callis won a Saturn Award, for Best Supporting Actor on Television. He was nominated again in 2006.
