= Battlestar Galactica (miniseries) =

2003 American science fiction miniseries

- DVD cover
- Also known as: Battlestar Galactica: The Miniseries
- Genre: Science fiction; Drama
- Based on: A teleplay by Glen A. Larson
- Written by: Ronald D. Moore; Glen A. Larson (Note: Credited with the pseudonym "Christopher Eric James".)
- Directed by: Michael Rymer
- Composers: Richard Gibbs; Bear McCreary (additional)
- Country of origin: United States
- Original language: English
- No. of episodes: 2

Production
- Executive producers: David Eick; Ronald D. Moore
- Producer: Harvey Frand
- Production locations: Vancouver, British Columbia
- Cinematography: Joel Ransom
- Editor: Dany Cooper
- Running time: 180 minutes
- Production company: USA Cable Entertainment

Original release
- Network: Sci Fi
- Release: December 8 – December 9, 2003

Related
- Battlestar Galactica (2004); Battlestar Galactica (1978)

Battlestar Galactica: The Miniseries is a three-hour television miniseries (comprising four broadcast hours) starring Edward James Olmos and Mary McDonnell, written and produced by Ronald D. Moore and directed by Michael Rymer. It was the first part of the Battlestar Galactica remake based on the 1978 Battlestar Galactica television series, and served as a backdoor pilot for the 2004 television series. The miniseries aired originally on Sci Fi in the United States starting on December 8, 2003. The two parts of the miniseries attracted 3.9 and 4.5 million viewers, making the miniseries the third-most-watched program on Syfy.

== Plot ==
=== Part 1 ===
After a 40-year armistice in a war between the Twelve Colonies of Kobol (the homeworlds populated by humans) and the Cylons (human-created robots), the Cylons launch a surprise nuclear attack intended to exterminate the human race. Virtually all of the population of the Twelve Colonies is wiped out. Most of the Colonial military is either rendered ineffective or destroyed due to malware in the military computer network that renders it vulnerable to cyber attack. The malware was introduced by Number Six (Tricia Helfer), a Cylon in the form of a human woman, who seduced the famous scientist Dr. Gaius Baltar (James Callis) and exploited their relationship to gain access codes under the cover of an insider contract bid.

The Battlestar Galactica, a hybrid battleship/aircraft carrier in space that fought in the earlier war, is in the final stages of being decommissioned and converted to a museum when the attack occurs. During her decades of colonial service the Galactica's computer systems had never been networked so the Galactica is unaffected by the Cylon sabotage. Its commander, William Adama (Edward James Olmos), assumes command of the few remaining elements of the human fleet. He heads for the Ragnar Anchorage, a military armory station where the Galactica can resupply itself with weaponry and essential supplies.

Secretary of Education Laura Roslin (Mary McDonnell) is sworn in as President of the Twelve Colonies after it is confirmed that the President and most of the government have been killed (Roslin is 43rd in the line of succession). The government starship carrying her (Colonial One) manages to assemble a group of surviving civilian ships.

When a Colonial Raptor shuttle from the Galactica lands briefly for repairs on the Twelve Colonies' capital world of Caprica, the two-person crew, Sharon Valerii (callsign "Boomer"; Grace Park) and Karl C. Agathon (callsign "Helo"; Tahmoh Penikett), offer to evacuate a small group of survivors. Helo remains on the stricken planet, giving up his seat to evacuate Baltar, whom he recognizes for his celebrity status as a scientific genius.

=== Part 2 ===
The Cylons locate the human civilian fleet, and Roslin is forced to make the decision to order all of the ships capable of faster-than-light (FTL) travel to jump immediately to escape. Unfortunately this means abandoning many of the survivors who are aboard ships without FTL engines and, as Roslin and the FTL ships jump away, the Cylons launch an attack on the remaining ships.

At the Ragnar Anchorage space station, Adama is attacked by a supposed arms dealer named Leoben Conoy who claims to be simply bootlegging supplies, but who is clearly being affected by the radiation cloud surrounding Ragnar, which humans are immune to. Adama deduces that he is facing a new type of Cylon that looks, sounds, and acts human.

As the civilian fleet joins the Galactica at Ragnar, President Roslin appoints Dr. Baltar, who has not disclosed his suborning by the Cylons, as one of her scientific advisers to combat the Cylons. Number Six reveals herself to Baltar in hallucinatory form while attempting to direct his behavior. She suggests that she planted a microchip inside Baltar's brain while he slept, allowing her to transmit her image into his conscious mind. Responding to one of her suggestions, he is compelled to identify Aaron Doral, a public relations specialist, as a Cylon agent masquerading as a human. Despite his protests and the lack of any evidence to support the accusation, Doral is left at Ragnar when the Galactica departs.

As the Cylons blockade Ragnar, the Galactica and its fleet of Vipers engage the Cylon fleet in order to allow the civilian fleet to escape by "jumping" to a distant, unexplored area outside of their star system. The Galactica and the colonial fleet make good their escape. At a funeral, Adama announces his plan to reach a legendary thirteenth colony called "Earth", whose existence and location have been closely guarded military secrets. Roslin is skeptical and later confronts Adama who admits that Earth is simply a myth but he used it as a means to give people hope for the future.

Returning to his quarters, Adama finds an anonymous note has been left for him stating "There are only 12 Cylon models." On Ragnar, Doral is rescued by a group of Cylons consisting of multiple copies of the Number Six, Leoben and Doral models, confirming his identity as a Cylon. When the group discuss how to track down the human fleet, a copy of Boomer arrives and reassures them that they will find them.

== Cast ==
Actor	Role	Notes
Edward James Olmos	Commander William Adama	Commander of the Battlestar Galactica
Mary McDonnell	Laura Roslin	President after the destruction of the Twelve Colonies
Katee Sackhoff	Lieutenant Kara "Starbuck" Thrace	Colonial Viper pilot
Jamie Bamber	Captain Lee "Apollo" Adama	Colonial Viper pilot
James Callis	Dr. Gaius Baltar	Scientist and defense researcher
Tricia Helfer	Number Six	Cylon
Callum Keith Rennie	Leoben Conoy	Cylon posing as a human arms dealer
Grace Park	Lieutenant Junior Grade Sharon "Boomer" Valerii	Colonial Raptor pilot teamed with Helo, Cylon
Michael Hogan	Colonel Saul Tigh	Executive officer of the Battlestar Galactica
Matthew Bennett	Aaron Doral	Cylon posing as a public relations agent
Paul Campbell	Billy Keikeya	Laura Roslin's aide
Aaron Douglas	Chief Petty Officer Galen Tyrol	In charge of maintenance of Colonial Vipers and Colonial Raptors
Lorena Gale	Elosha	Priestess
Barclay Hope	Transport Pilot	Captain of Laura Roslin's ship
Kandyse McClure	Petty Officer Anastasia "Dee" Dualla	Communications officer on the Battlestar Galactica
Connor Widdows	Boxey	Young boy who survives the Holocaust on Caprica
Alessandro Juliani	Lieutenant Felix Gaeta	Tactical officer on the Battlestar Galactica
Nicki Clyne	Specialist Cally	Repairs Colonial Vipers and Colonial Raptors under Chief Tyrol
Tahmoh Penikett	Lieutenant Karl "Helo" Agathon	Electronic countermeasures officer teamed with Boomer
Alonso Oyarzun	Socinus	One of Tyrol's deck hands
Ty Olsson	Cpt. Aaron Kelly	The LSO on Galactica

== Production ==
=== Development ===
None of the previous attempts to remake or continue the story of Battlestar Galactica by Tom DeSanto and original series star Richard Hatch were successful. From the mid-1990s onwards, actor Richard Hatch (Captain Apollo from the original version of the series) made numerous efforts to revive the series, including co-writing several novels and a comic book series, and even went as far as to produce a proof-of-concept trailer called The Second Coming. Hatch's campaign was based on the continuation of the original series, set several years after the final episode. DeSanto's planned version, which went into pre-production before being delayed and subsequently scrapped following the events of the 9/11 terrorist attacks of 2001, was also a continuation, set some 25 years after the original series. Both versions ignored the events that occurred in Galactica 1980.

In 2002, Universal Pictures (the legal rights holder to Battlestar Galactica), instead opted for a remake rather than a sequel. David Eick approached Ronald D. Moore about a new four-hour Battlestar Galactica miniseries for Universal. Moore developed the miniseries with Eick, writing the scripts and updating the old series, also developing a backstory that could work for a regular weekly series, should the miniseries be successful. At the same time, Moore was approached by HBO about running a new television series, Carnivàle. While Moore worked on the first year of Carnivàle, Eick ran the day-to-day production of the Battlestar Galactica miniseries in Canada. Battlestar Galactica aired in 2003 and became the highest-rated miniseries on cable that year, and the best ratings that year for any show on Sci-Fi. After Carnivàle reached the end of its first season and the Sci-Fi Channel ordered a thirteen-episode weekly series of Battlestar Galactica, Moore left Carnivàle to assume a full-time executive producer role on Battlestar Galactica.

=== Filming ===
The special effects of the miniseries were created by Zoic Studios, who previously worked on the Firefly television series. In the opening minutes of Part 1, as the character of Laura Roslin sits in her doctor's office, a Firefly class ship is seen flying above the city. However, the ship does not appear in the Season 2 episode "Epiphanies" in which Roslin reflects on her wait in the doctor's office.

The regular series also contains effects by Atmosphere Studios, Enigma Animation Productions and the production's own effects team. Executive producer Ronald D. Moore said the outer space battles were created and rendered to look like a Discovery Channel crew was actually shooting footage. Filming took place in Vancouver, British Columbia.

=== Music ===
The soundtrack for the miniseries was largely scored by Richard Gibbs.

== Reception ==
=== Critical response ===
On Rotten Tomatoes the miniseries has an approval rating of 83% based on reviews from 12 critics.

Brian Lowry of Variety wrote: Battlestar Galactica takes a while to find its directional heading and build up steam, but once it does, this proves to be a surprisingly engrossing odyssey." Ned Martel of The New York Times wrote: "The project might all be an exploitative departure from the Battlestar Galactica brand name, but it's hard not to like where the spacemen (and spacewomen) are going." Sonia Saraiya of The A.V. Club reviewing the miniseries in 2014 gave it a grade of A−.

=== Awards ===
Wins

- 2003 Visual Effects Society Awards – Outstanding Visual Effects in a Television Miniseries, Movie or a Special
- 2003 Saturn Awards – Best Television Presentation

Nominations

- 2003 Visual Effects Society Awards – Outstanding Compositing in a Televised Program, Music Video or Commercial
- 2003 Visual Effects Society Awards – Outstanding Models and Miniatures in a Televised Program, Music Video or Commercial
- 2004 Emmy Awards – Outstanding Single-Camera Picture Editing for a Miniseries, Movie or a Special (Miniseries, Night 1)
- 2004 Emmy Awards – Outstanding Sound Editing for a Miniseries, Movie or a Special (Miniseries, Night 2)
- 2004 Emmy Awards – Outstanding Special Visual Effects for a Miniseries, Movie or a Special (Miniseries, Night 1)
- 2003 Saturn Awards – Best Supporting Actress on Television, Katee Sackhoff

== Novelization ==
In 2005, Tor Books published Battlestar Galactica (the miniseries), by Jeffrey A. Carver—a novelization of the 2003 miniseries. The book incorporates deleted scenes and gives background information not seen on screen.
