= Laura Roslin =

Character in Battlestar Galactica (2004)

- Battlestar Galactica character
- First appearance: "Miniseries" (2003)
- Last appearance: "Daybreak (Part 3)" (2009)
- Portrayed by: Mary McDonnell

In-universe information
- Species: Human
- Gender: Female
- Occupation: Secretary of Education of the Twelve Colonies of Kobol (Miniseries); President of the Twelve Colonies of Kobol
- Colony: Caprica
- Affiliation: Twelve Colonies of Kobol

Laura Roslin is a fictional character in the reimagined Battlestar Galactica series. Played by Mary McDonnell, she is the President of the colonies and a key character throughout the series. The character is noted in part for a realistic moral complexity and nuance.

== Character analysis and reception ==
Multiple authors have analyzed the character of Laura Roslin.

Geoff Ryman praises both the writing and performance. He highlights many aspects of the character including the moral complexity her decisions exemplify in the show, which "is commenting on modern issues in a way that does not take sides". Karen Walsh, author of An Encyclopedia of Female Heroes in Popular Culture, calls the character realistic and nuanced, explaining that Roslin is defined by both strength and weakness, hubris and a belief in the greater good. She notes that "Laura Roslin's willingness to accept consequences and admit mistakes offers a model proving the importance of multifaceted characters.... Her flaws empower her." Roz Kaveney says, "Roslin is a schoolteacher turned politician turned prophet – she is almost by definition extraordinary."

Daniel Milsky, writing in the essay collection Battlestar Galactica and Philosophy: Mission Accomplished or Mission Frakked Up?, describes Roslin's character evolution through the show. To start "she appears to be a nonsectarian voice of reason... simply a victim of circumstance." Later in the series, perhaps due to the "chamalla" she uses to fight her cancer, she begins having visions, eventually coming to believe she "is fulfilling a 1,600-year old prophecy and has been fated to lead the colonists to their salvation".

Jason P. Blahuta, assistant Professor of Philosophy at Lakehead University, compares Roslin to Lucretia as portrayed in Niccolò Machiavelli's play La Mandragola, "in a world of evildoers the only way to secure happiness for everyone is to become corrupt and play the game", describing Roslin's evolution from noble and naïve to someone willing to get their hands dirty.

When the fleet is first finding and rescuing survivors, upon the urging of Apollo, Roslin adopts a utilitarian attitude according to Dr. Randy Jensen, writing in another collection of essays, Battlestar Galactica and Philosophy: Knowledge Here Begins Out There. Roslin applies this approach at other times in the series as well.

=== Femininity ===
In the essay collection Battlestar Galactica: Investigating Flesh, Spirit and Steel., Matthew Jones, lecturer at De Montfort University, notes that within the fleet, traditional femininity is rare, but that Roslin "seemingly exudes it from every pore," with several examples. Jones dives into the example of "Roslin’s faith, an intangible, ethereal and thus – within the logic of normative gender identities – feminine force", explaining how this feminine is juxtaposed with to the masculinity of William Adama's military command. Jones further explains that Roslin is characterized as more traditionally feminine in these spiritual moments, but "when the fate of the fleet in involved, however, she must behave according to a more volatile, masculine code of conduct."

Author Sarah Conly similarly states, "Roslin, while demonstrating more of the mannerisms found in traditional maternal care, can be ruthless in advocating violence against those she sees as a danger", further explaining that BSG's portrayal of gender roles exemplifies Simone de Beauvoir's belief in no inherent nature for men or women.

=== Roslin and America ===
Multiple authors analyze the character in the context of the Bush administration, Jennifer Stoy says "Roslin’s place in the succession – forty-three – is an oblique reference to George W. Bush’s presidential number, and her fundamentalist ties are most certainly meant to evoke the former American president." C.W. Marshall and Tiffany Potter note how through the character's set of values, "BSG deconstructs the compulsory correlatives that divide contemporary thinking about American culture and identity."

In the episode "Bastille Day", Laura Roslin tries to make a deal with prisoners for labor. Tom Zarek declines, eventually seizing Roslin's delegation as hostages, demanding her resignation and free elections to choose leadership that represents the people. As Roslin was not elected by the people, Brian L. Ott explains the parallels the show is drawing to Bush, who lost the popular vote to Al Gore in 2000. Ott also notes the timing of the episode, one day after Bush's second inauguration, as well as the decision Roslin makes to assassinate Zarek as a refusal to negotiate with terrorists.

=== Treatment of Cylons ===
The distinction and treatment of Cylons is a central theme for the character. Shawn Malley says that Roslin is firm in her distinction of Cylons and humans due to the threat Cylons impose, allowing for torture of a Cylon prisoner. Karen Randell places this event the context of the early 2000s Bush Administration, describing the torture Roslin witnesses and her ultimate execution of a potential terrorist. Randell says the character's actions are "a sobering reminder that in times of war, laws can be reinterpreted", comparing this to president Bush's signing statement of the Detainee Treatment Act. E. Leigh McKagen explains this act as part of a theme of government formation through the early episodes of the series.

Marco Fey, et al. explain Roslin's ridicule of Cylon Athena's feelings of love as part of a larger rejection of Cylon humanity by the humans of the show.

When Hera, a half-human, half-cylon child is born, Gaius Baltar declares her as half-human. Magali Rennes notes that, focused on her concern for the security of the fleet, "Roslin implies, like Moreau de St. Méry, that the tiniest drop of Cylon blood show Hera is not at all human." However, when Roslin's cancer is soon cured by an injection of Hera's blood, Roslin does not view herself as Cylon. Roslin herself architects the abduction of the child, but much later in the series seems to have softened on allowing her Cylon mother to raise her.

At one point, given the opportunity to commit genocide against the Cylons, Roslin authorizes the act because they are "a mortal threat to the survival of the human race". The plan is ultimately undermined by the actions of Helo.

=== The survival of humanity ===
As a leader of the survivors of humanity, a focus on survival is another key aspect of the character. McKagen notes that "President Roslin places prime importance on the reproduction of the human race, going so far as to issue a controversial limitation on abortion in 'The Captain’s Hand', despite her previously pro-choice position. Also noting both a scene in an earlier episode in which, when a baby is born, Roslin adds 1 to the survivor count of humanity, and another one in which she says to William Adama, "we need to get the hell out of here and start having babies". Enrica Picarelli and M. Carmen Gomez-Galisteo compare Roslin's act of banning abortion within the fleet to George W. Bush's 'commander power', "indefinitely extending the governmental reach into the lives of its citizens."

=== Relationship to other characters ===
Corrine Pache examines Roslin in comparison to Dido from the Aeneid. According to Pache, Laura Roslin is a tragic figure. She's introduced this way, learning of terminal breast cancer at the very start of the show. Additionally, throughout the show, other tragic experiences from her past relationships are revealed.

Pache claims this leads the character "to a life in which she is incapable of connecting with anyone." This ultimately manifests in a long-delayed admission of love for William Adama, her military counterpart in the show. Rennes explains how early on in the show, the two characters "preserve themselves and their romance... by cloaking themselves in official colonial terms" for all things military and government. According to Rennes, "Mom and Dad are in control.... Everything's gonna be okay." Stoy calls the later relationship a sexist cliché, in contrast to early characterization "challenging gender stereotypes", while Kaveney explains that the relationship is kept on hold until Roslin is too sick to perform her presidential duties.

Roslin and Adama's relationship goes through many iterations, some negative, including an instance where he jails her, accusing her of sedition. Later, in the second season, when President Roslin and Commander Adama cannot agree where to go, Roslin takes one third of the fleet, forcing Adama to decide whether to follow.

Roslin also provides a counter to Gaius Baltar's behavior. Roslin asks Baltar to be her vice president, he first accepts but later wants to back out. Later he publicly defends her against a political opponent, and yet eventually he expresses doubt that she ever thought he was capable. Later still, Baltar runs for president against Roslin. Lorna Jowett explains this as a clash of science and religion. This coincides with issues around abortion, drawing another parallel to American elections.

In a character role reversal, Baltar at one point expresses disapproval toward Roslin of the tactic of human suicide bombers, and she's ultimately unable to approve of it but remains understanding.

Kaveney also points out that for three and a half seasons, Roslin suspected Baltar's role in humanity's destruction, yet when she gets proof of his responsibility, her faith does not allow him to die.

=== Further characterization ===
In the show, Roslin is shown to enjoy reading, and watching boxing, going so far as to give advice in a boxing match.

A fighter vessel is christened Laura in her honor, going on to play an important role in the narrative.

Ryman notes some character defining moments. "Laura Roslin tries to rig an election. She is the first to suggest that they will have to assassinate Admiral Cain"

Kaveney says that Roslin "has a last finest hour" addressing the fleet during a mutiny, in the episode "Blood on the Scales".

== Development ==
Unlike most of the other central human characters at the start of the series, Roslin has no direct analogue in the original 1978 program, though a character named Siress Tinia (played by Ina Balin) featured in the original series episode "Baltar's Escape". In that episode, Tinia is a member of the Quorum of Twelve, assigned to shadow Adama as an "advisor" and the Quorum's official representative. She sometimes comes into conflict with Adama and challenges his decisions, much like Laura Roslin does with Commander William Adama, though the two eventually grow to respect each other.

While it may be a coincidence, her name is an amalgam of the forenames of the U.S. First Ladies in 2003 and 1978: Laura Bush and Rosalynn Carter. According to McDonnell, influences for the character included Madeleine Albright and Hillary Clinton.

Executive producer Ronald D. Moore called Roslin "vital to the life of this series, as opposed to the original series." The approach of the reimagined series required a substantial political apparatus so that the military led by Adama would not take primacy in civilian life. It would also allow the writers to put the military and civilian leadership into conflict.
