= Number Eight (Battlestar Galactica) =

Fictional character in Battlestar Galactica (2004)

- Battlestar Galactica character
- Grace Park as Number Eight
- First appearance: Miniseries
- Last appearance: Battlestar Galactica: The Plan
- Portrayed by: Grace Park

In-universe information
- Aliases: Boomer, Athena
- Species: Humanoid Cylon
- Gender: Female
- Title: Lieutenant Junior Grade
- Colony: Cylon Homeworld, claims to be from Aerelon's colony Troy
- Affiliation: Colonial Fleet/Cylons

Number Eight is a humanoid Cylon model on the television series Battlestar Galactica, a reimagining of the 1978 show of the same name. She is portrayed by Canadian-American actor Grace Park. Two prominent Number Eight copies serving as pilots on the Battlestar Galactica are Sharon Valerii and Sharon Agathon, using the call signs "Boomer" and "Athena", respectively. The call signs for both Sharons are references to two characters from the original Battlestar Galactica series: Viper pilot Lieutenant Boomer, played by Herbert Jefferson, Jr., and Lieutenant Athena, the daughter of Commander Adama (Lorne Greene), played by Maren Jensen.

== Notable copies ==
Cylon models Six and Eight are the most common in the series. Two Number Eight copies are featured as central characters — Boomer and Athena.

=== Sharon "Boomer" Valerii ===
Lieutenant Junior Grade Sharon "Boomer" Valerii is a Cylon sleeper agent programmed with false memories of being raised in the mining colony Troy. Before the mini-series, Boomer and Galen Tyrol are romantically involved. Her programming leads her to sabotage the Galactica on several occasions, which Tyrol unwittingly abets by hiding evidence implicating her. In "Kobol's Last Gleaming", Commander Adama sends Boomer on a mission to destroy the Cylon basestar orbiting Kobol; upon her return, she shoots Adama twice in the chest, putting him in a coma and revealing her nature to the crew. In "Resistance", while Boomer is being transported from the brig, Cally shoots and kills her.

In "Downloaded", Boomer's preserved consciousness is downloaded into a new body in Cylon-occupied Caprica. She resists being identified with the Cylon cause and tries to persuade the Cylons to reduce hostility against humans. In "The Eye of Jupiter", Boomer attempts to care for Athena's hybrid child Hera on the Cylon base ship, where the child ended up after the New Caprica evacuation. In a conflict with the visiting Athena over whether the humans negotiated in good faith, Boomer is killed by Caprica Six for endangering the child. After resurrecting into a third body, Boomer develops a relationship with John Cavil, a Number One who embraces his machine nature and sees human traits as a weakness. Cavil enlists Boomer's support when the Cylon models become deadlocked in a vote over whether the Raiders should be lobotomized. Boomer turns against Cavil during the Colonial assault on the Cylon colony. After returning Hera to Athena and Helo, who were part of the boarding party, Boomer is executed by Athena for her previous actions.

=== Sharon "Athena" Agathon ===
Sharon "Athena" Agathon is originally created to impersonate Boomer and ensure the success of a Cylon experiment to create a Human-Cylon hybrid. She aids Karl "Helo" Agathon on Caprica, intending eventually to kill him. However, she eventually falls genuinely in love with Helo and tries to help him escape, during which he both discovers her true identity and that she is pregnant with his child. Sharon uses her knowledge of the Tomb of Athena on Kobol as leverage to avoid immediate execution aboard Galactica and consistently demonstrates her loyalty by defending the group from Cylon ambushes. Sharon's reunion with the Galactica personnel is tense due to Boomer's history with them, but she makes it clear that she and Boomer are different people.

Upon learning of irregularities in the pregnancy, President Roslin orders it terminated but rescinds the decision when Sharon's fetal blood is used to cure her terminal cancer. Sharon gives birth to her child prematurely and names her Hera. The Colonial administration decides it is too dangerous to let a hybrid child be raised by a Cylon mother, so they fake the child's death and rehome her with a human mother. Despite the strain this puts on Sharon's loyalty, she continues to help the Galactica.

Sharon and Helo are married in the gap between Season 2 and Season 3, and Sharon is recognized for her service by being sworn in at Boomer's rank of Lieutenant JG. She is sent back to New Caprica as the liaison between the Galactica fleet and the resistance effort and is able to infiltrate the Cylon base and steal the keys for the civilian ships. After the successful rescue mission, Sharon is assigned to join the Galactica's pilot corps with the callsign "Athena" after the goddess of warfare and wisdom. During negotiations between the Colonials and the Cylons, Athena and Helo learn that their daughter is alive on a Cylon Basestar. Athena travels to the ship, retrieves her daughter, and escapes with the help of Caprica Six, who kills Boomer after she threatens to kill Hera. Athena is then reunited with Helo aboard the Galactica. Later, she joins Starbuck's mission to find Earth and helps her liaise with a rebel Cylon group led by Natalie.

After a dream in which she sees a Six taking Hera, Sharon assassinates Natalie, straining the alliance with the Cylons. Although she is placed under arrest, she is eventually pardoned by Adama. Later, when Boomer pretends to help Ellen Tigh escape from Cylon Colony, Sharon is arrested on the Galactica but manages to escape and kidnap Hera. In the final arc of the show, Sharon joins Helo and Starbuck to storm the Cylon Colony. After saving her daughter, she honors Boomer's wish to be executed for betraying the Colonial cause.

== Analysis ==
The character has been discussed in the context of stereotypes of Asians, and the relationships between Asian Americans and white Americans. Juliana Hu Pegues writes that the different copies of Number Eight highlight and challenge varying stereotypical descriptions of Asian Americans; Boomer, as the unaware sleeper agent, appears as the "model minority", while Athena, initially acting with the intent to deceive, typifies a "yellow peril" stereotype. Eve Bennett similarly writes that Boomer's actions as a sleeper agent echo stereotypes of East-Asians as conformist and robotic, and a character whose motivations cannot be understood in human terms. The use of Number Eight to depict the uniformity in Cylon society in "Kobol's Last Gleaming" also highlights similar stereotypes. Bennett also comments that the repeated depiction of naked Number Eight models (when Cylons are usually clothed) is an example of the eroticization of East-Asian women in the Western media.

Number Eight's plotline has been compared to those of Miss Saigon and Madame Butterfly. Athena's eventual romance with Karl Agathon, which leads her to change her allegiance to the humans, is specifically described as mirroring the narrative in "Miss Saigon", despite Battlestar Galactica's color-blind casting. This narrative is later subverted, when a scene mirroring Miss Saigon's suicide occurs when Athena is "killed" so she may download into a new body and rescue her child. Bennett writes that while Number Eight in some ways defies the stereotype of a femme fatale — Athena remains faithful to Karl Agathon — narrative tension surrounds this eventual outcome, and numerous similarities exist to other robotic characters who embody that stereotype. Boomer, despite siding with the Cylons, appears to remain in love with Tyrol, and tries to persuade him to come away with her. Athena, conversely, does not entirely abandon her Cylon identity despite remaining loyal to the humans. More generally, she retains a "spirited personality", and does not flinch from expressing strong views and challenging Helo's actions. She is thus described as subverting narratives of obedient and passive "oriental" women and the "Madame Butterfly" trope.

Pegues writes that in the human society depicted in the series, race is not a meaningful category, but the show nonetheless explores racial difference via Human-Cylon relations. The character of Athena also defies the Human-Cylon binary; though allied with the humans, she refuses to identify other cylons hidden among them, refusing an "absolute allegiance". Pegues describes her as a liminal subject, and writes that her "irreducibility" made the series an enjoyable one to analyze. The plotline of Athena's child, in particular, is described as examining the fear of miscegenation in white societies: the "biracial" child is an object of anxiety among the humans, and its birth mother is entirely excluded from decisions about it.

Number Eight, and Boomer specifically, also symbolize the othering of West Asian and Arab peoples following the September 11 attacks, particularly when she is tortured in "Litmus". Pegues compares the treatment of the Number Six prisoner on the Battlestar Pegasus (where she is raped, and endures other physical abuse) to the treatment of Boomer as a prisoner on Galactica. She writes that while the comparison superficially suggests that Galactica prosecutes a more humane war, it symbolizes the overt abuses in Abu Ghraib and the less publicized treatment of prisoners at Guantanamo Bay detention camp.

== See also ==
- Woman warrior
- List of women warriors in folklore
