= Barge of the Dead =

- Star Trek: Voyager episode
- Episode no.: Season 6 Episode 3
- Directed by: Mike Vejar
- Story by: Ronald D. Moore; Bryan Fuller
- Teleplay by: Bryan Fuller
- Production code: 223
- Original air date: October 6, 1999

Guest appearances
- Eric Pierpoint as Kortar; Sherman Augustus as Hij'Qa; Karen Austin as Miral

Episode chronology
← Previous "Survival Instinct"	Next → "Tinker Tenor Doctor Spy"
- Star Trek: Voyager season 6

"Barge of the Dead" is an episode of the American science fiction television series Star Trek: Voyager. It is the third episode of the sixth season and was first broadcast by UPN on October 6, 1999. "Barge of the Dead" was developed from a story by Ronald D. Moore and Bryan Fuller, who wrote the teleplay, and was directed by Mike Vejar. Set in the 24th century, the series follows the adventures of the Starfleet and Maquis crew of the starship USS Voyager after they are stranded in the Delta Quadrant, far from the rest of the Federation.

In this episode, the half-Klingon, half-human B'Elanna Torres (Roxann Dawson) has a near-death experience and appears to be sent to the Klingon version of Hell known as Gre'thor. There she encounters her Klingon mother Miral (Karen Austin), who is damned because of Torres' refusal to fully accept her own identity as a Klingon. After being resuscitated by the Voyager crew, Torres becomes intent on revisiting Gre'thor to save her mother. The episode also guest stars Eric Pierpoint as Kortar, who ferries the souls of the dishonored on the Barge of the Dead, and Sherman Augustus as the dead Klingon Hij'Qa.

Moore originally developed the episode as part of a pitch for the Star Trek: Deep Space Nine episode "Soldiers of the Empire". The idea was initially rejected, but was revisited for Star Trek: Voyager. Following the episode's completion, both Moore and Fuller left the series because of dissatisfaction with their lack of control over its direction, and the perceived absence of strong story arcs across multiple episodes. "Barge of the Dead" was one of several episodes that addressed Torres' strained relationship with her parents and her Klingon heritage. Scholars have offered a range of opinions on Gre'thor, with the setting and ideology compared to Norse mythology, Greek mythology, and Catholic theology. The episode received a Nielsen rating of 3.8/6 ratings share, meaning 3.8 percent of all households with a television viewed it and six percent of homes then viewing television were tuned to it. It was a drop from the episode broadcast the previous week. Critical response to the episode was mixed; some television critics commended the focus on Torres, and praised Dawson's performance, while others were critical of the representation of Klingon spirituality.

== Plot ==
While returning from an away mission, B'Elanna Torres encounters interference from an ion storm which results in a concussion. Commander Chakotay finds a Klingon artifact lodged inside Torres' shuttlecraft, and Torres sees this emitting blood and hears voices speaking in the Klingon language. Since the USS Voyager is stranded in the Delta Quadrant, the ship is several thousand light-years away from Klingon-controlled space. Morale officer Neelix plans a celebration of the discovery of the object, believing it originates from the Alpha Quadrant and thus proves Voyager is getting closer to home; Torres resists the proposal for a party. She consults with Security Chief Tuvok, who believes her negative response to the object stems from her hatred of her Klingon heritage. Tuvok assaults Torres with a Klingon weapon called a bat'leth, saying she is not a true Klingon before dismissing her as dishonored. While attending the festivities in the mess hall, Torres notices the Doctor and Seven of Nine singing Klingon drinking songs and Tom Paris eating Klingon cuisine. After witnessing several Klingon warriors killing the crew, she falls and finds herself aboard a boat. Torres discovers she is being transported to Gre'thor on the Barge of the Dead, and that her mother Miral was placed aboard as a dishonored soul.

Torres awakes to find she has been in a coma the entire time. She had almost died from the accident in the ion storm. Chakotay believes Torres' encounter with her mother was a hallucination prompted from her near-death experience, but she believes that it was real. Torres believes her mother is being punished because of her daughter's dishonor, saying that she must return to the Barge of the Dead to rescue her. Captain Kathryn Janeway permits Torres to put herself in an induced coma, with the Doctor monitoring the procedure. After being placed in a coma, Torres successfully returns to the barge. She reunites with her mother, but they argue about whether or not she has truly embraced Klingon spirituality. Miral responds by telling her she does not understand what it truly means to be a Klingon. After their conversation, Torres decides to take her mother's place on the barge; even though Miral resists the transference, she is allowed to move on to Sto-vo-kor (a version of the afterlife similar to the Norse Valhalla) while Torres is escorted into Gre'thor. She discovers that Voyager is her version of Gre'thor, and is confronted by alternate versions of the crew. Miral returns to explain that she cannot fully be released into Sto-vo-kor until Torres completes her journey. Tuvok attacks Torres again with a bat'leth, but she surrenders rather than fighting back. Miral identifies this as the first step in her path. She informs Torres that they will reunite either in Sto-vo-kor or when Torres returns home. Torres is resuscitated and embraces Janeway.

== Production ==
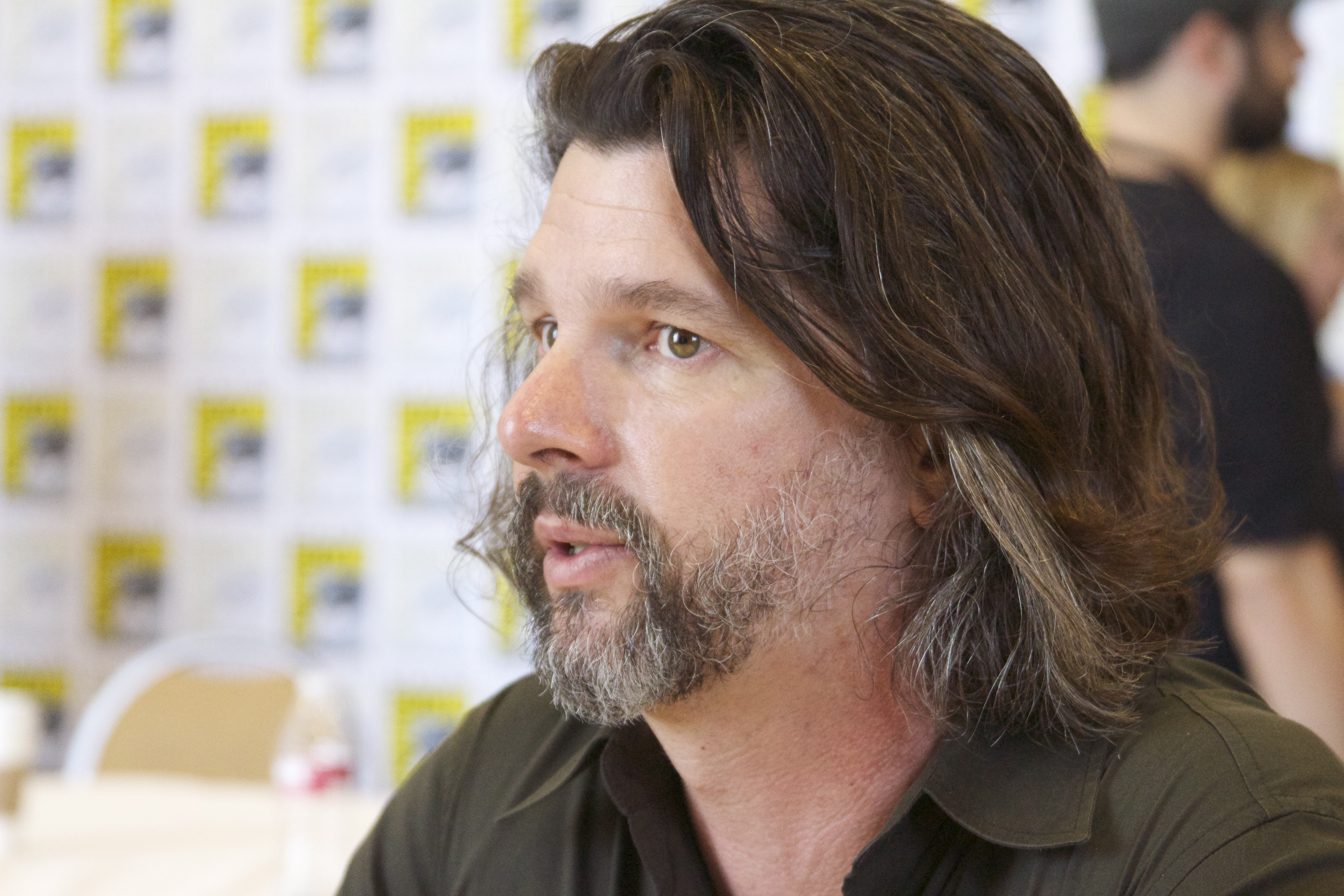
Ronald D. Moore originally pitched the idea for "Barge of the Dead" as a Star Trek: Deep Space Nine episode before it was produced for Star Trek: Voyager.

The 43-minute, 56-second episode was developed from a story by Ronald D. Moore and Bryan Fuller, who wrote the teleplay, and was directed by Mike Vejar. David Bell edited the music, and Richard D. James was the production designer. The concept for the episode developed from Moore's failed pitch for the Star Trek: Deep Space Nine episode "Soldiers of the Empire", which would have seen the Klingon starship Rotarran travel to Gre'thor. Moore's idea was rejected as "too philosophical for this late in the season". The barge would later appear in Star Trek Online, a massively multiplayer online role-playing game (MMORPG) developed by Cryptic Studios based on the Star Trek franchise.

Moore contributed to only two episodes in Star Trek: Voyager, the other being "Survival Instinct", the immediate predecessor to "Barge of the Dead". Discussing why he left the series, he said he wanted to further develop more of its story arcs and characters, particularly focusing on the "internal strife among people trapped aboard ship(s) without any reasonable hope of finding sanctuary anytime soon".

Fuller also left Star Trek: Voyager after the completion of the episode, citing disappointment in his lack of control over the show's direction. He said he "began to get itchy and wanting to tell stories with a little more emotional depth", and that he disliked how syndication discouraged longer story arcs spanning multiple episodes. Fuller's episodes frequently focused on "character development through adversity". ExtremeTech's Joel Hruska wrote that the show's later seasons would typically feature Seven of Nine, the Doctor, and Janeway to the detriment of the rest of the cast, while Fuller would draw more attention to the more underused characters. While discussing the episode, actress Roxann Dawson described the storyline as a "classic Star Trek story" due to its focus on family. The episode features Karen Austin as Torres' mother Miral, and also includes Eric Pierpoint as Kortar, who ferries the souls of the dishonored on the Barge of the Dead, and Sherman Augustus as the dead Klingon Hij'Qa.

== Analysis ==
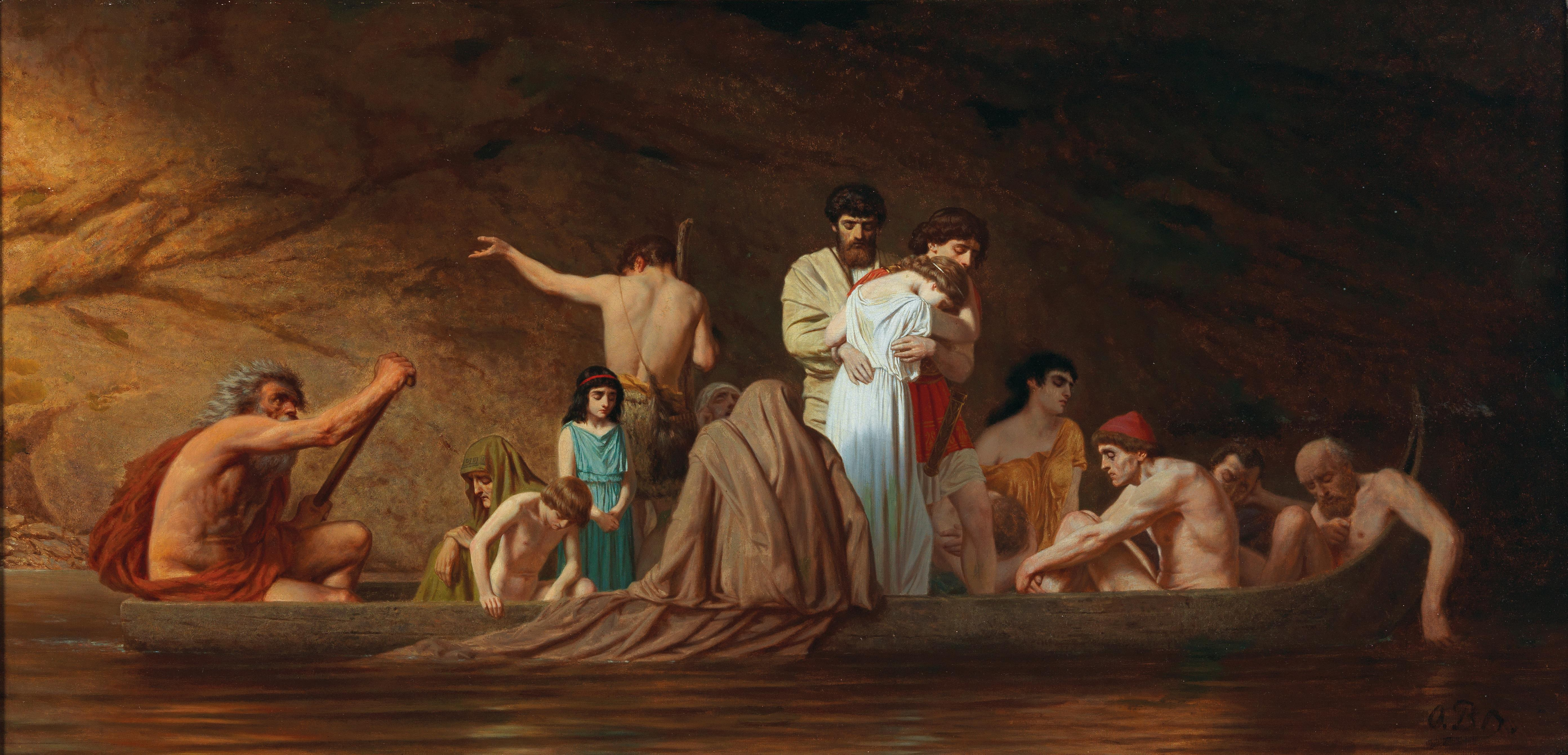
Critics compared the episode's representation of Gre'thor to mythological views of the afterlife, such as the rainbow bridge Bifröst or the river Styx (pictured).

TrekToday's Edward James Hines identified "Barge of the Dead" as the final part of a "probably unplanned 'Torres Trilogy'", which also included the episodes "Day of Honor" and "Extreme Risk". Each one was broadcast as the third episode of their respective seasons; Hines viewed each installment of the trilogy as being linked by Torres' fear of death. He wrote that the episode showed how Torres becomes "responsible to herself and to others—no matter the risk—while choosing to live". Writer Paul Ruditis viewed the emphasis on Torres' "duality of nature" as leading to the development of several episodes prominently showcasing her character, including "Barge of the Dead". Ruditis connected Torres' storyline to Seven of Nine's in "Survival Instinct", writing that they both "deal with issues of life and death, with dramatic results". He referred to "Barge of the Dead" and "Survival Instinct" as "equally dark episodes". "Barge of the Dead" was also one of three episodes featuring Torres' relationship with her parents, with the season seven episodes "Lineage" and "Author, Author" resolving her estrangement from her father.

"Barge of the Dead" was the first episode to provide a detailed account of Gre'thor, which was previously referenced only in Star Trek: The Next Generation. The title was developed from "the Klingon belief that the dead travel to Gre'thor on a barge steered by a ferryman". Religious studies scholars Ross Kraemer, William Cassidy, and Susan L Schwartz interpreted the representation of Gre'thor and Klingon spirituality as borrowing from Norse and Greek mythology, specifically the crossing of the rainbow bridge Bifröst or the river Styx. Exploring the influence of the Greek story of Odysseus (Latin: Ulysses) on Star Trek: Voyager, the Classical philologist Otta Wenskus points to Siren-like creatures who call out with the voices of those loved by those on the barge. Though the motif of a barge and ferryman is not present in Homer's portrayal of the underworld in the Odyssey, it was subsequently popularized by its use in Virgil's Aeneid and Dante's Inferno. The pediatrician Victor Grech, in a paper on Klingon culture, interpreted Torres' belief in the Klingon mythological figure Fek'lhr, who tortures the souls of the dishonored, as being in line with Catholic views of Satan.

Kraemer, Cassidy, and Schwartz argued that "Barge of the Dead" mirrored the Star Trek: The Next Generation season six episode "Rightful Heir" by not providing a clear answer as to whether Torres' experiences in the Klingon afterlife were real or part of an hallucination. The Native American studies scholar Sierra S. Adare was critical of the portrayal of Chakotay—a Native American character—as dismissive of Torres' sincere belief in her experiences, writing that "[n]o Native person would ever dismiss another's visions as hallucinations or tell them to ignore their religious beliefs". She cited it as one instance in which the series represented Chakotay as "the quintessential Tonto in outer space".

== Broadcast history and release ==
"Barge of the Dead" was first broadcast on October 6, 1999, on UPN at 8:00 pm Eastern Standard Time in the United States. The episode received a Nielsen rating of 3.8/6 ratings share. This means 3.8 percent of all households with a television viewed the episode, while among those households watching TV during this time period six percent of them were actively watching the program. "Barge of the Dead" placed in 93rd place overall for the week. This marked a drop in viewership compared to the previous episode, "Survival Instinct", which had earned a 3.9 rating.

The episode was first released for home media use on VHS as part of a two-episode collection with "Survival Instinct". It was released on DVD as part of the sixth season on December 7, 2004. It was the only Star Trek: Voyager episode included on the DVD compilation Star Trek Fan Collective – Klingon, which was released on August 1, 2006. The episode has also been made available on streaming video on demand services.

== Critical reception ==
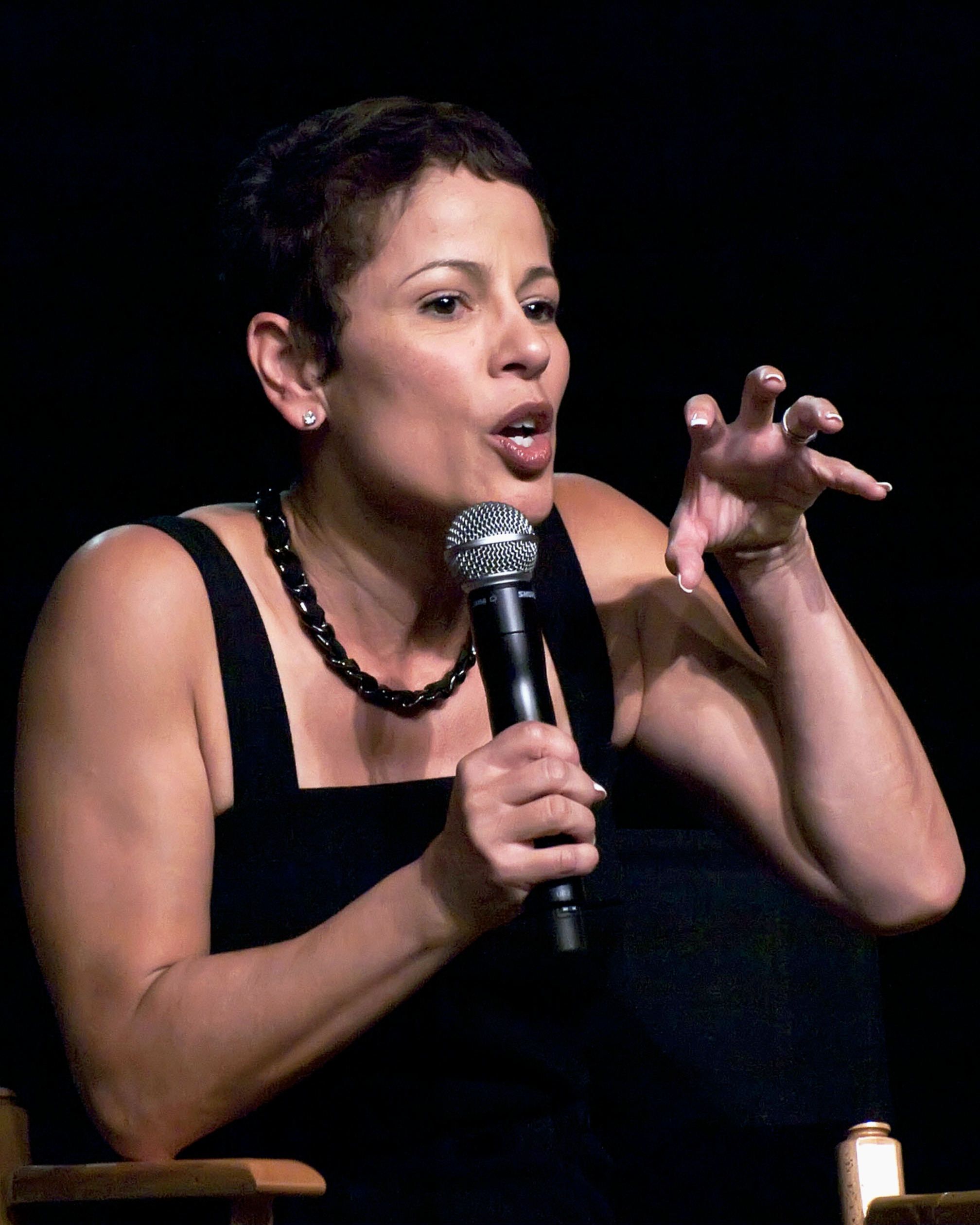
Roxann Dawson, pictured in 2003, was praised for her performance.

Television critics responded positively to Dawson's performance and the episode's focus on Torres. IGN's Peter Schorn wrote that the episode was "[a]nchored by Dawson's panicked performance", and praised the focus on the character's internal conflict. While reviewing the episode as a part of the "Torres Trilogy", Edward James Hines praised it as "impressively manag[ing] to weave an evolving story of personal exploration"; he wrote that all of the episodes involved in the trilogy left a "legacy of imaginative, gut-wrenching storytelling".

The representation of Klingon mythology garnered negative reviews from critics. Despite her praise of Dawson, Tim Russ, and Kate Mulgrew, TrekToday's Michelle Erica Green felt the episode bore too many similarities to earlier Star Trek installments and the 1990 film Flatliners. Hines, writing for the same publication, disliked how Fek'lhr, introduced in the Star Trek: The Next Generation episode "Devil's Due", was absent and felt he could have been represented with CGI animation. She criticized the parallels between Miral and Janeway, and wrote that certain scenes would have been effective without Janeway. Ranking it at number thirteen out of the twenty-two Star Trek episodes written by Fuller, Blastr's Dany Roth praised the writer's attempt to better address Torres as a character, but felt his approach to the afterlife and spirituality were too direct and literal. John Andrews of Den of Geek! enjoyed the episode's emphasis on Torres and Klingon mythology, but felt it was "still pretty hokey". In a 2017 The Daily Dot article, Gavia Baker-Whitelaw described "Barge of the Dead" as a "refreshing change from all those Worf episodes, because it's all about women". She included it in her list of Klingon-centric episodes people should watch in preparation of Star Trek: Discovery, which is the first Star Trek installment to feature an entire Klingon crew in the main cast.
