= Warhead (Star Trek: Voyager) =

- Star Trek: Voyager episode
- Episode no.: Season 5 Episode 25
- Directed by: John Kretchmer
- Story by: Brannon Braga
- Teleplay by: Michael Taylor; Kenneth Biller
- Production code: 219
- Original air date: May 19, 1999

Guest appearances
- McKenzie Westmore - Ens. Jenkins; Steven Dennis - Onquanii

Episode chronology
| ← Previous "Relativity" | Next → "Equinox, Part I" |
- Star Trek: Voyager season 5

"Warhead" is the 119th episode of the science fiction television series Star Trek: Voyager, the 25th episode of the fifth season. It aired on UPN on May 19, 1999.

In this episode, the USS Voyager, a spacecraft traveling through the galaxy in the 24th century, encounters an alien bomb with artificial intelligence.

== Plot ==
An away team on an uninhabited planet finds a small spaceship, crashed and damaged. Upon finding that its programming is fully sentient and in distress, the Doctor asks that the crew rescue it and return it to its people.

The artificial intelligence's memory is damaged, and it cannot tell them what its function is; however, it is soon found to be a weapon of mass destruction. At the Doctor's behest, Captain Janeway keeps the missile aboard, but orders B'Elanna Torres and Harry Kim to disarm the warhead before it remembers what it is.

However, during the procedure, the warhead's intelligence takes over the Doctor's holomatrix, and traps Kim and Torres in sickbay. Threatening to detonate, the warhead orders the Captain to take it to its target. While the rest of the crew look for ways to disable the intelligence, Kim tries to reason with it. The bomb refuses to listen, insisting that it must be allowed to reach its target, and threatens to detonate and destroy the ship if the crew does not comply.

Voyager crew members attempt to reconstruct the warhead's damaged memory circuits. They determine that its creators, a race called the Druoda, halted all hostilities with their enemy and issued recall orders to its fleet of sentient warheads. Most complied, but 32 warheads malfunctioned and did not receive the order. This warhead is one of those, and was forcibly crash-landed by the Druoda (by remote) to prevent it from detonating. The warhead does not believe this, and thinks that the order to stand down was faked by the enemy.

However, Kim reasons that the recall orders are protected by a code that is nearly impossible to break. The warhead is eventually convinced that hostilities are over; however, more than 30 of its fellow warheads are still functional, and have already found Voyager. They ignore the Druoda order to stand down, and the warhead realizes what it must do next. The warhead is downloaded back into its 'body' (freeing the Doctor) and returned to its companions, whereupon it detonates, destroying itself and the other smart bombs.

== Releases ==
This episode, "Warhead", was released on LaserDisc in Japan on June 22, 2001, as part of 5th Season vol.2. The episode had two audio tracks, English and also Japanese. This was the last season released on LaserDisc. This set had 6 double sided 12" optical discs giving a total runtime of 552 minutes.

The episode was released on VHS paired with "Equinox, Part I".

On November 9, 2004, this episode was released as part of the season 5 DVD box set of Star Trek: Voyager. The box set includes 7 DVD optical discs with all the episodes in season 5 with some extra features, and episodes have a Dolby Digital 5.1 surround sound audio track.

The episode was released as part of a complete series DVD box set for Star Trek : Voyager in 2017.

== See also ==
- Dreadnought (Star Trek: Voyager)
- Prototype (Star Trek: Voyager)
- Dark Star (film), an earlier film featuring a smart bomb
