= Alice (Star Trek: Voyager) =

- Star Trek: Voyager episode
- Episode no.: Season 6 Episode 5
- Directed by: David Livingston
- Story by: Juliann deLayne
- Teleplay by: Bryan Fuller; Michael Taylor
- Production code: 226
- Original air date: October 20, 1999

Guest appearances
- Claire Rankin - Alice; John Fleck - Abaddon

Episode chronology
← Previous "Tinker Tenor Doctor Spy"	Next → "Riddles"
- Star Trek: Voyager season 6

"Alice" is the 125th episode of the science fiction television series Star Trek: Voyager, the fifth episode of the sixth season. In the 24th century, USS Voyager helmsman Tom Paris takes on a salvaged spacecraft. However, the time he is spending on this hobby creates issues with his partner B'Elanna Torres. There turns out to be something wrong with the spacecraft.

== Plot ==
The Federation starship Voyager finds an alien junkyard and trades for supplies with the junk dealer, Abaddon. Ship's pilot Tom Paris discovers a derelict shuttle in the yard and convinces his superiors to let him bring it aboard and restore it, just as he has been doing with old cars on the holodeck as a hobby. He discovers that the shuttle is equipped with a neural interface. It reads and communicates directly with its pilot's mind, giving it instantaneous maneuverability. He tries out the interface and the ship makes a record of his brain patterns.

As time goes on Paris becomes more and more obsessive about restoring and caring for his new shuttle, which he has named Alice. He can even hear "her" speaking to him in his mind. His behavior becomes more and more strange. He wants to spend time with Alice and no one else. Chief Engineer B'Elanna Torres is distressed about Paris's obsession. He begins to neglect his appearance and duties, looking more tired and frantic as time goes on, and he wears a spacesuit designed for use with Alice instead of his Voyager uniform. When power cells from Voyager's back-up systems go missing, Torres finds them in the cargo bay where Paris fixes Alice. She then sneaks aboard Alice to see what is drawing Paris there so strongly, but the ship springs to life, traps her inside, and shuts off life support.

Paris gets Torres out of the shuttle before she is seriously injured, but soon after that he loses control of his own behavior. He boards Alice and speeds away from Voyager with her, disappearing from Voyager's sensors. Janeway contacts Abaddon to try to learn more about Alice, and discover that Abaddon too still struggles with his previous encounters with her. From him, they identify that the intelligence behind Alice was trying to head toward a particle fountain, which it called home; the fountain would destroy the craft and its pilot should it get inside. Voyager arrives in time, but find they cannot use weapons to stop the ship without harming Paris, his mind still linked to the ship. Torres uses Voyager's neural interface to project herself to Paris and convince him to return to Voyager, allowing Tactical Officer Tuvok to sever the neural link to Alice. Paris is transported back to Voyager moments before Alice is destroyed in the fountain. Paris and Torres reconcile in Sickbay following Paris' recovery.

== Releases ==
This episode was released as part of a season 6 DVD boxset on December 7, 2004.

== Reception ==
According to David E. Sluss, the episode bears resemblance in some elements to the Stephen King novel Christine, such as the idea of a vehicle having a consciousness.
