= Survival Instinct =

Survival Instinct may refer to:

- Self-preservation, behavior that ensures the survival of an organism
- Survival Instinct (Star Trek: Voyager), the second episode of the sixth season of the science fiction television series Star Trek: Voyager
- The Walking Dead: Survival Instinct, a 2013 video game
