= Lineage (Star Trek: Voyager) =

- Star Trek: Voyager episode
- Episode no.: Season 7 Episode 12
- Directed by: Peter Lauritson
- Written by: James Kahn
- Production code: 258
- Original air date: January 24, 2001

Guest appearances
- Manu Intiraymi - Icheb; Juan Garcia - John Torres; Jessica Gaona - Young B'Elanna Torres; Javier Grajeda - Carl Torres; Paul Robert Langdon - Dean Torres; Nicole Sarah Fellows - Elizabeth Torres; Gilbert R. Leal - Michael Torres

Episode chronology
← Previous "Shattered"	Next → "Repentance"
- Star Trek: Voyager season 7

"Lineage" is the 158th episode of the TV series Star Trek: Voyager, the 12th episode of the seventh season. B'Elanna and Tom Paris struggle through the pregnancy of their child.

This episode aired on the United Paramount Network (UPN) on January 24, 2001.

== Plot ==
B'Elanna Torres is in a good mood, until she arrives at work in Engineering and almost faints. Icheb scans her and states that he is "detecting another life sign. … Inside Lt. Torres. It could be a parasite." Seven of Nine also scans Torres and comes up with a different diagnosis: B'Elanna is pregnant.

The Doctor confirms Seven's diagnosis. The fetus is seven weeks old, and perfectly healthy, except for a genetic defect that causes abnormal spine curvature in Klingon females. B'Elanna, who is half Klingon, had surgery as a baby to correct this defect. The Doctor says that nowadays genetic resequencing is the preferred treatment and that he can perform the procedure the following day. He also shows B'Elanna and her husband Tom Paris a holographic projection of what their daughter will look like. Tom thinks she is beautiful but B'Elanna is distressed to learn her daughter will have Klingon facial ridges.

During the procedure the next day, B'Elanna reminisces back to her childhood as a Klingon girl on the colony in which she grew up. She blames herself, especially her Klingon half, for her human father leaving her, and her teasing and harassment by other children for being half Klingon, and resolves to not let the same happen to her daughter. She proposes further genetic resequencing to delete various Klingon genes in order to make her daughter fully human, but the Doctor and Tom disagree.

During one of the couple's arguments, Torres mentions that Voyager's crew includes 140 humans. She claims that if her daughter is even one quarter Klingon, human society will treat her as a "monster". They cannot reach a consensus, so they speak to Captain Janeway, who tells them that their problem is not about ethics, it is about marital affairs. As a friend, she will offer them advice; but as the captain, she will not overrule the Doctor. They still cannot work it out, so Paris ends up staying the night in his friend Harry Kim's quarters. The next day, they seem to make up, but just then, the Doctor calls them.

In Sickbay, the Doctor reveals that he has changed his mind and believes that the procedure will be required. Tom is disturbed by this and seeks a second opinion from Icheb. Icheb discovers an error in the Doctor's new assessment and Seven discovers that the Doctor's program has been tampered with. Tom stops the procedure in the nick of time, and he and B'Elanna have an argument. She tearfully admits what she fears will happen to her daughter; that Paris will leave them like her father left her and her mother, and Tom reaffirms his commitment to his growing family. The Doctor's alterations are removed, and B'Elanna apologizes to the Doctor and asks him to be the godfather. The Doctor accepts, and B'Elanna feels the baby kick. She then sees the holographic projection one more time and admits that she is cute.

== Reception ==
In a review of the series, Den of Geek ranked this the tenth best episode of Star Trek: Voyager. They also ranked it the 10th best morality play of the Star Trek franchise. Io9's top 100 list of Star Trek episodes placed "Lineage" as the 96th best episode of all series up to that time, out of over 700 episodes.

The Digital Fix noted this as another episode that uses Torres' Klingon heritage as a plot element, but in this case also explores her relationship with her father using the flashbacks. SyFy said this was a "gut wrenching" episode, as B'Elanna is challenged by pregnancy and family heritage.

== Home media releases ==
On December 21, 2003, this episode was released on DVD as part of a Season 7 boxset; Star Trek Voyager: Complete Seventh Season.

== See also ==
- Author, Author (Star Trek: Voyager)

The "Torres Trilogy":

- Barge of the Dead (S6E3)
- Day of Honor (S4E3)
- Extreme Risk (Star Trek: Voyager) (S5E3)
