= Survival Instinct (Star Trek: Voyager) =

- Star Trek: Voyager episode
- Episode no.: Season 6 Episode 2
- Directed by: Terry Windell
- Written by: Ronald D. Moore
- Production code: 222
- Original air date: September 29, 1999

Guest appearances
- Scarlett Pomers - Naomi Wildman; Vaughn Armstrong - Lansor (a.k.a. Two of Nine); Bertila Damas - Marika Wilkarah (a.k.a. Three of Nine); Tim Kelleher - P'Chan (a.k.a. Four of Nine); Jonathan Breck - Dying Borg

Episode chronology
← Previous "Equinox, Part II"	Next → "Barge of the Dead"
- Star Trek: Voyager season 6

"Survival Instinct" is the 122nd episode (the second episode of the sixth season) of the science fiction television series Star Trek: Voyager. In this episode, Voyager encounters three aliens played by guest stars Vaughn Armstrong, Bertila Damas, and Tim Kelleher. This show expands the story of the character Seven of Nine.

The episode was written by Ronald D. Moore.

== Plot ==
Voyager is docked at the Markonian Outpost Space Station, which has welcomed the wayward ship with open diplomatic arms, allowing the free exchange of gifts and ideas. While meeting several representatives of various species in the mess hall, a man approaches Seven of Nine and reveals a container of several Borg implants, which she keeps. The sight stuns Seven and brings back memories from her past as a Borg. As the man walks away, it is revealed that he is in telepathic communication with two other guests aboard Voyager, colluding with them to penetrate the ship's security systems.

With B'Elanna Torres' help, Seven identifies the implants as part of her own unimatrix but denies having experienced any feelings at the sight of them. After returning to her Borg alcove to regenerate, the man and his two accomplices enter the cargo bay, revealing themselves as former Borg drones. They attempt to inject Seven with nanoprobes but she detects their presence, stops the attack, and alerts security. The three are subdued and taken to sick bay. The Doctor determines that while they are former Borg, the process to remove their Borg implants was imperfect which left the three with a shared mental connection. When they awake, the three affirm their condition, stating that they were also part of Seven's unimatrix, and want to bring her into that connection to learn what happened some years ago when their Borg scout ship crashed on an uninhabited planet. Seven herself cannot recall the event, but agrees to link to the others temporarily to attempt to uncover it.

Told in flashbacks through the episode, after the crash, the four survivors – no longer in contact with the Borg collective – constructed a communication array to contact the Borg for rescue. As they waited, the other three began to feel some aspects of individuality, while Seven fought against it. When they realized the Borg were approaching, the other three attempted to flee, but Seven followed them and re-injected each with nanoprobes, neutralizing their individualistic tendencies and re-assimilating them into the Collective.

Back in the present day, the three former drones have two options: continue with their present existence or the Doctor can remove more of their Borg implants, severing their connection; however, this process would irreparably damage their bodies, leaving them with only a month to live. The Doctor asks Seven for her opinion; she consults Chakotay, who asks her what she would rather do: live as a Borg for a normal lifespan or as an individual for a month. Seven is visibly moved and tells the Doctor to remove the others' implants. The Doctor protests, saying that his objective should be to preserve life at all costs; however, Seven argues that, like herself, even the Doctor was once a "drone" of sorts (confined to the ship's Sickbay) and that he would resist any attempts to force him back to that state. The Doctor accepts this logic and removes the implants from the former drones. Lansor (the former Two of Nine) elects to explore the station for the remainder of his life; Marika (Three of Nine) accompanies Voyager on its journey; and P'Chan (Four of Nine) chooses to spend his remaining days on a nearby uninhabited planet.

== Reception ==
SyFy recommend "Survival Instinct" for their Seven of Nine binge-watching guide.

In 2012, this episode was noted for focusing on the Borg and Seven of Nine.

In 2020, Tom's Guide listed this as one of the best episodes for the character Seven of Nine (Jeri Ryan).

In 2020, The Digital Fix said this was a "Fascinating exploration of Seven's time as a Borg" and noted that it was written by Ronald D. Moore before he left the series. Moore had previously written episodes for Star Trek: Deep Space Nine, which had recently concluded its run.

Tor.com gave this episode 9 out of 10 in a review in 2021, and praised the story by writer Ronald D. Moore. They remark, "Ronald D. Moore is one of the best writers of Trek in its screen history" and also praised guest star Vaughn Armstrong.

== Releases ==
This episode was released as part of a season 6 DVD boxset on December 7, 2004.

"Survival Instinct" was released on VHS, paired with "Equinox, Part II" on one cassette.

The episode has also been made available on numerous streaming video on demand services by 2016, such as Amazon Video, iTunes, Hulu, and Netflix.
