= Dead Stop =

- Star Trek: Enterprise episode
- Episode no.: Season 2 Episode 4
- Directed by: Roxann Dawson
- Written by: Michael Sussman; Phyllis Strong
- Production code: 204
- Original air date: October 9, 2002

Episode chronology
← Previous "Minefield"	Next → "A Night in Sickbay"
- Star Trek: Enterprise season 2

"Dead Stop" is the thirtieth episode (production #204) of the science fiction television series Star Trek: Enterprise, the fourth of the second season. The episode aired on UPN on October 9, 2002. It was directed by Star Trek: Voyager cast member Roxann Dawson.

After the Enterprise was damaged in the previous episode, "Minefield", the crew finds itself in need of assistance to effect repairs. They send a distress call, and the Tellarites send the coordinates of a station—a station capable of serving their every need at a cost which seems too good to be true.

The episode won an award from the Visual Effects Society, and was also nominated for an Emmy award.

== Plot ==
Four days after getting caught in a minefield, Captain Archer and Commander Tucker inspect the damage to the ship. As the damage would take months to repair, and returning to Jupiter Station would take years, Archer decides that it is time for someone to help them out for once, and orders Ensign Sato to send a general distress call. A Tellarite freighter responds, and sends a barely understandable message including co-ordinates directing them to an automated repair facility, three days away at Warp 2.

Arriving at the facility, the ship is scanned and the station reconfigures itself to suit the crew's needs. Enterprise docks, and the station sets the full repair price at 200 liters of warp plasma. Using its advanced replication technology, the station can complete all repairs in just 34.2 hours. Archer, left without any other option, agrees, although he has a gut feeling that not everything is as it appears. Intrigued by the station's technology, Tucker convinces Reed to visit the station's computer, but their attempt to do so via a ventilation duct is detected, and they are beamed back to the Enterprise's bridge. Captain Archer is not amused, and orders them confined to quarters for the remainder of their stay at the spacedock.

Meanwhile, a false comm message, ostensibly from Archer, directs Ensign Mayweather to an area currently being repaired. His body is found soon after, an apparent victim of an electrical shock. When Doctor Phlox discovers that the dead Mayweather is a well-replicated duplicate, Archer resolves to search the station for him.

Tucker 'distracts' the computer, and Reed again trips the alarm, giving Sub-Commander T'Pol and Archer time to enter a computer room filled with bodies — among which are a Klingon, a Vulcan, and a Cardassian — apparently the station's method of augmenting its own processing power. Mayweather is rescued as the station begins attacking Enterprise in retaliation for their trespassing in the main computer room. Archer then detonates the warp-plasma payment to blow up the station and escape.

As the Enterprise warps away, the wreckage of the station has begun repairing itself.

== Production ==
The idea for the episode came together while developing the previous episode "Minefield". Brannon Braga and John Shiban thought it was important to acknowledge that the ship had been badly damaged and did not want the ship to be all back to normal before the next episode. They also wanted to do it so that both episodes could be watched as standalone shows, in what they called "continuity without being serialised." The episode itself was written by Michael Sussman and Phyllis Strong. The episode was directed by Roxann Dawson, her third time directing an episode of Enterprise. Dawson also provided the voice for the space repair station's main computer, but was not credited for this role. An actress was hired to play the computer voice but Rick Berman thought it had been done by Dawson and asked her to do it again for the final cut of the episode. Dawson was concerned that her voice might be too easily recognizable and a distraction but Berman convinced her to do it. Dawson thought the concept of the episode was great, and "was very pleased with the way it came out". Dawson said the station interior design had a clean sterile look, reminiscent of 2001: A Space Odyssey. Filming took longer than usual, over a week and half, as production resources and actors were needed to film additional scenes for the previous four episodes. Visual effects producer Dan Curry was filming exterior ship shots for "Minefield" with Dominic Keating. Other directors were filming pick-up shots for "Carbon Creek," "Shockwave, Part II" and "A Night in Sickbay."

The same type of station appears again in the novel Rise of the Federation: Uncertain Logic and it is revealed they belong to a race known as "The Ware".

== Reception ==
"Dead Stop" was first broadcast October 9, 2002, on UPN. It had a Nielsen ratings share of 3.5/6. It had a total average audience of 5.4 million viewers.

In 2005, The Digital Fix praised this episode answering the question of how a spacecraft could be repaired in space, and also for tying in with the previous episode, "Minefield", when the spacecraft was damaged. They commended the episode for what they thought was a decent science fiction concept, a sinister repair station. Writing for StarTrek.com Jordan Hoffman said the episode was innovative, but criticized the villain: "it's hard not to think about the killer repair station as anything other than a haunted conveyor car wash." In his 2022 rewatch, Keith DeCandido of Tor.com gave it three out of ten. He "almost liked" the episode, but not the ending; he found it both "incredibly convenient" and that the destruction "showed a depraved indifference to sentient life", which he viewed as conflicting with the very premise of Star Trek.

H&I noted this as an episode of Star Trek featuring scary or eerie content, and said "you don't need a shadowy, dim spaceship to elicit chills. Sometimes, bright, white and antiseptic can be equally unsettling". The Gamer ranked this one of the top 25 creepiest episodes of all Star Trek series. Den of Geek included "Dead Stop" on their list of Star Trek's 50 Best Episodes, and wrote: "the automated station manages to be more sinister and alien than any guest star, with its clean and bright interiors." Den of Geek ranked this episode as the 26th most scary episode of all Star Trek franchise television episodes.

== Awards ==
"Dead Stop" was nominated for an Emmy Award in the category "Outstanding Special Visual Effects For A Series". The episode won an award from the Visual Effects Society in the category Best Models and Miniatures in a Televised Program, Music Video, or Commercial. Modelmakers John Teska, Koji Kuramura, Pierre Drolet and Sean Scott were honored for their CGI work on the automated repair station shown in the episode.

== Home media release ==
"Dead Stop" was first released for home media use on DVD as part of the second series box set of Star Trek: Enterprise. Season Two was released on Blu-ray Disc August 20, 2013.
