= Dragon's Teeth (Star Trek: Voyager) =

- Star Trek: Voyager episode
- Episode no.: Season 6 Episode 7
- Directed by: Winrich Kolbe
- Story by: Michael Taylor
- Teleplay by: Michael Taylor; Brannon Braga; Joe Menosky
- Cinematography by: Marvin V. Rush
- Production code: 225
- Original air date: November 10, 1999

Guest appearances
- Jeff Allin - Gedrin: Ron Fassler - Morin; Robert Knepper - Gaul; Bob Stillman - Turei; Mimi Craven - Jisa; Scarlett Pomers - Naomi Wildman

Episode chronology
← Previous "Riddles"	Next → "One Small Step"
- Star Trek: Voyager season 6

"Dragon's Teeth" is the 127th episode of the American science fiction television series Star Trek: Voyager airing on the UPN network. It is the seventh episode of the sixth season.

The episode name refers to the Greek legend of dragon's teeth, where the teeth of a slain dragon were sown into the battlefield. The teeth sprouted up into an army of warriors, who continued to fight.

== Plot ==
In a city under attack, Gedrin convinces his nervous wife, Jisa, to enter a stasis chamber and then enters one himself.

Voyager is caught in a so called underspace corridor. A vessel of the Turei species helps Voyager re-enter normal space. When Captain Kathryn Janeway discovers they have traveled more than 200 light years in a few minutes, she requests that the Turei aid them further, but the Turei insist on wiping Voyager's computers of any information regarding the corridor. When Janeway refuses, the Turei ship attacks and summons reinforcements. Janeway has Voyager land on a nearby planet, shrouded in radiation that prevents the Turei from following them. The crew begins repairs while the Turei remain in orbit.

The planet contains the remains of a civilization that was destroyed nearly 900 years earlier. Detecting lifesigns, Janeway, Lt. Tuvok, and Seven of Nine discover stasis chambers, containing several hundred alien bodies. Seven, without waiting for Janeway's orders, wakes Gedrin. Jisa's body has decomposed and Gedrin mourns the loss of his wife. Recovering aboard Voyager, Gedrin explains that his race, the Vaadwaur, discovered the subspace corridors and were attacked by other races who wished to seize them. He and hundreds of other Vaadwaur, along with their weapons and ships, entered stasis in caverns below the planet's surface, anticipating being revived five years later, but their control equipment was apparently damaged. Gedrin struggles with how much time has passed. The Vaadwaur were familiar with Neelix's species, the Talaxians; Neelix recognizes the term "Vaadwaur" as an old Talaxian word meaning "foolish".

Janeway and Gedrin plan to fight off the Turei and return to the subspace tunnels, and proceed to waken the other Vaadwaur; Commander Chakotay is reminded of a Greek myth whereby warriors would rise after the teeth of a defeated dragon were buried in the ground. Neelix and Seven research the Vaadwaur in Talaxian folklore and a Borg database, discovering that the Vaadwaur were the aggressors, using their subspace corridors to invade planets; Neelix informs Janeway. Meanwhile, Voyager's crew are unaware that the Vaadwaur plan to hijack Voyager in order to conquer a new colony for themselves. Gedrin warns Janeway, siding with Voyager's crew against his own people.

After the Vaadwaur turn openly hostile, Janeway allies with the Turei. Tuvok and Gedrin return to the planet to jam a satellite, allowing the Turei to use it to target the Vaadwaur ships. After Tuvok returns to the ship, Gedrin stays behind to maintain the signal; he is killed when the chamber collapses. Voyager escapes and leaves the sector. They detect that 53 Vaadwaur ships escaped the Turei assault and could threaten them in the future. Seven apologizes for causing the new war by waking Gedrin, but Janeway notes she might have done the same.

== Production ==
Although at the end of the episode, Janeway notes that it might not be the last time Voyager encounters the Vaadwaur, they are not seen directly again for the remainder of the series. The Vaadwaur were later introduced as the main enemy in the Delta Rising expansion of Star Trek Online.

== Releases ==
This episode was released as part of a season 6 DVD boxset on December 7, 2004.
