= Ronald D. Moore =

American screenwriter and television producer (born 1964)

- Moore at Worldcon 2026
- Born: Ronald Dowl Moore; July 5, 1964 (age 62); Chowchilla, California, U.S.
- Education: Cornell University
- Occupations: Screenwriter, television producer
- Writing career
- Genres: Drama, science fiction
- Notable works: Star Trek: TNG; Star Trek: DS9; Battlestar Galactica; Outlander; For All Mankind

Ronald Dowl Moore (born July 5, 1964) is an American screenwriter and television producer. He is best known for his work on Star Trek, as well as on the re-imagined Battlestar Galactica television series, for which he won a Peabody Award, and on Outlander, based on the novels of the same name by Diana Gabaldon. In 2019, he created and wrote the series For All Mankind for Apple TV+.

== Early life ==
Moore was raised in Chowchilla, California. He describes himself as a 'recovering Catholic' and is agnostic. Moore dabbled in writing and drama in high school. He went on to study government (political science) at Cornell University, where he was Literary Secretary of The Kappa Alpha Society, originally on a Navy ROTC scholarship, but left during his senior year in the spring of 1986 after losing interest in his studies. He later completed his degree through Regents College. He served for one month during the summer of his freshman year on the frigate USS W.S. Sims.

Moore spent the next three years drifting between various odd jobs and temporary work. As Moore himself recounted in the book, Star Trek: The Next Generation 365, by the fall of 1986, he was "less than a year into my career as a college dropout... working as a medical records technician (otherwise known as a receptionist) at an animal hospital, all the while telling myself that I was actually a professional writer simply awaiting my inevitable discovery."

== Career ==
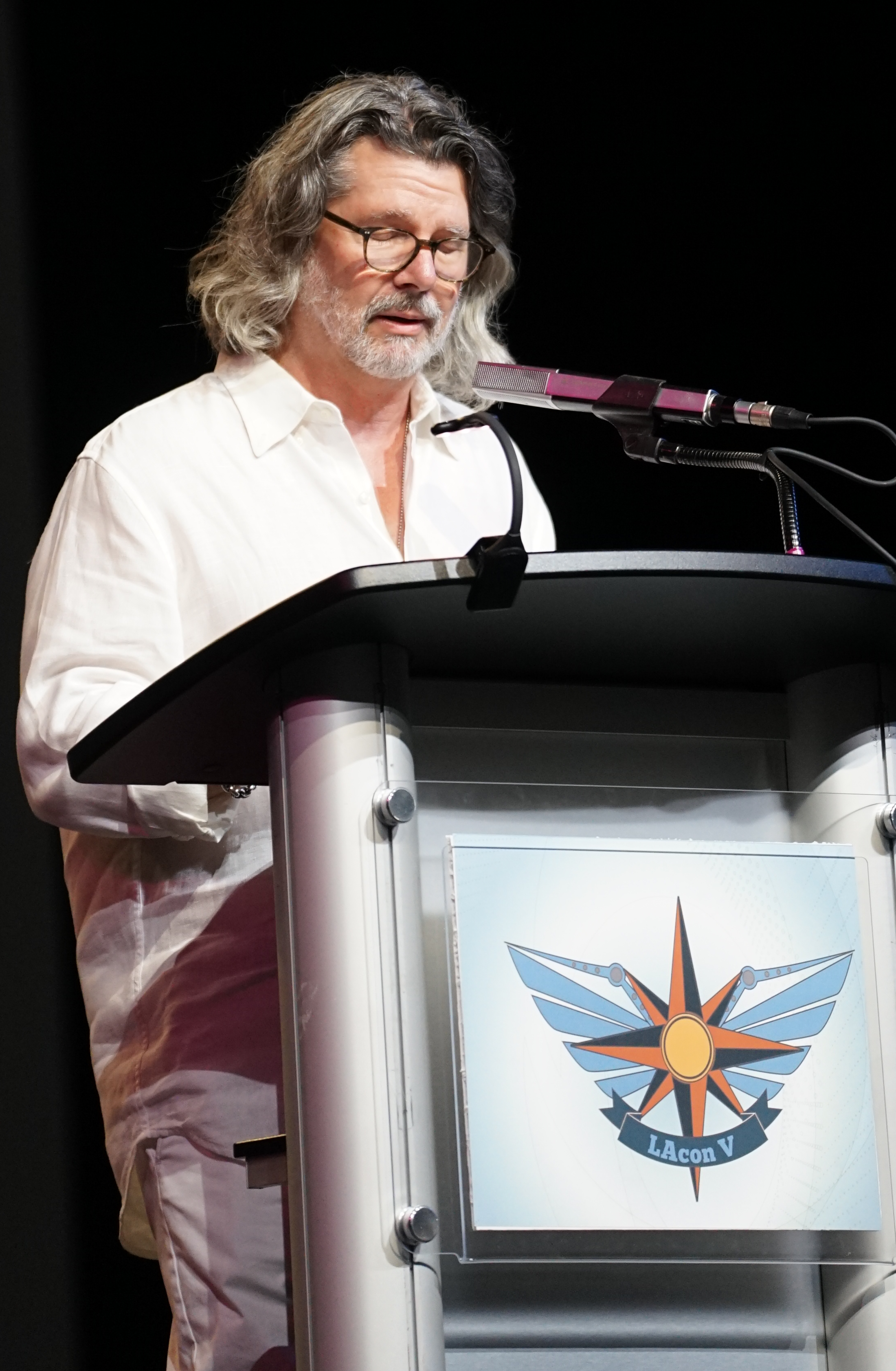
Moore at 2026 Hugo Award

=== Star Trek: The Next Generation (1988–1994) ===
In 1988, he toured the Star Trek: The Next Generation sets during the filming of the episode "Time Squared." While there, he passed a script he had written to one of Gene Roddenberry's assistants, who helped him get an agent who submitted the script through proper channels. About seven months later, executive producer Michael Piller read the script and bought it; it became the third-season episode "The Bonding." Based on that script, he was offered the opportunity to write a second script titled "The Defector" and that led to a staff position as a script editor. Two years later, he was promoted to co-producer, then producer for the series' final year (1994).

Moore wrote a number of episodes that developed the Klingon race and culture, starting with "Sins of the Father" which introduced the Klingon home world, the Klingon High Council, and the Klingon Chancellor, continuing with "Reunion," "Redemption, Part 1 and 2," "Ethics," and "Rightful Heir." He is credited with writing or co-writing 27 Next Generation episodes.

He co-wrote several episodes with Brannon Braga, developing a successful working relationship that led to them being offered the chance to write the series television finale, "All Good Things..." (which won the 1995 Hugo Award for Best Dramatic Presentation). The series also received an Emmy Award nomination in its final year for Outstanding Drama Series, losing to Picket Fences. The pair also wrote the screenplays for the Next Generation crew's first two big screen appearances, Star Trek Generations (1994) and Star Trek: First Contact (1996).

=== Star Trek: Deep Space Nine (1994–1999) ===
Moore then joined the production staff of Star Trek: Deep Space Nine for its third season as a supervising producer, being promoted to a co-executive producer position for the series' final two years. During this time he also worked again with Braga on the script for the second Next Generation motion picture Star Trek: First Contact and on a draft of the Mission: Impossible 2 script that was re-written by Robert Towne for which they received a "story by" credit.

During his time on Deep Space Nine, he continued to write episodes that expanded on Klingon culture such as "The House of Quark", "Sons of Mogh", "Rules of Engagement", "Looking for par'Mach in All the Wrong Places", "Soldiers of the Empire", "You Are Cordially Invited..." and "Once More Unto the Breach". He also wrote episodes that dealt with controversial subjects such as genetic engineering ("Doctor Bashir, I Presume?"), co-wrote the episode that featured Star Trek's first same-sex kiss ("Rejoined") and killed off another popular character, Vedek Bareil Antos ("Life Support").

During his time on Deep Space Nine, he also made an effort to engage with fans, frequently posting on AOL forums where he would answer fan questions or address their concerns about the show, a practice he continued with Battlestar Galactica through his weblog and in his podcasts.

=== Star Trek: Voyager (1999) ===
With the end of Deep Space Nine in 1999, Moore transferred to the production staff of Star Trek: Voyager at the start of its sixth season, where his writing partner Braga was executive producer. Moore left Voyager weeks later, with "Survival Instinct" and "Barge of the Dead" as his only credits. In a January 2000 interview for Cinescape magazine, Moore cited problems in his working relationship with Braga for his short stay,

I have very hurt feelings about Brannon. What happened between me and him is just between he and I. It was a breakdown of trust. I would have quit any show where I was not allowed to participate in the process like that. I wasn't allowed to participate in the process, and I wasn't part of the show. I felt like I was freelancing my own show. ... I was very disappointed that my long-time friend and writing partner acted in that manner, that crossed lines to the point where I felt like I had to walk away from Star Trek, which was something that meant a lot to me for a very long time, from my childhood right through my entire professional career.

Moore and Braga can be heard talking together on the commentary tracks for the DVD release of Star Trek Generations and Star Trek: First Contact.

=== Post-Star Trek career (2000–2003) ===
After leaving Voyager, Moore briefly worked as a consulting producer on Good vs Evil before joining Roswell as a co-executive producer and writer at the start of its second season in 2000. Moore and series creator Jason Katims jointly ran Roswell until the show ended in 2002. Moore wrote some of the show's most popular episodes, including "Ask Not" and the series finale "Graduation," which he co-wrote with Katims. He also wrote the episode "Cry Your Name."

During this time, Moore also developed a pilot based on Anne McCaffrey's Dragonriders of Pern for The WB, but production on the project was halted due to 'creative differences' between Moore and the network. The network tried changing the story (without Moore's approval) until it no longer resembled the original book series. Moore was an original fan of the books and refused to continue working on the pilot with the changes being made.

In 2002, David Eick (who Moore worked with on Good vs Evil) approached Moore about a new four-hour Battlestar Galactica mini-series for Universal. Moore developed the mini-series with Eick, writing the scripts and updating the old series, also developing a back-story that could work for a regular weekly series should the mini-series be successful. At the same time, Moore was approached by HBO about running a new television series called Carnivàle; however, they decided to offer the position to Henry Bromell instead and offered Moore a consultant position on the writing staff. He accepted, but Bromell left soon after production started and Moore became showrunner. While Moore worked on the first year of Carnivàle, Eick ran the day-to-day production of the Galactica mini-series in Canada. Galactica aired in 2003 and became the highest-rated miniseries on cable that year and the best ratings that year for any sci-fi show. After Carnivàle reached the end of its first season and the Sci-Fi Channel ordered a thirteen-episode weekly series of Galactica, Moore left Carnivàle to assume a full-time executive producer role on Galactica.

=== Battlestar Galactica (2004–2009) ===
The weekly Galactica television series debuted in October 2004 in the United Kingdom and January 2005 in the United States and Canada. Moore wrote the first two episodes of the new series, with the first episode "33" winning the 2005 Hugo Award for Best Dramatic Presentation, Short Form, the second that Moore has received during his career. In 2007, Moore was nominated once again for an Emmy Award for writing the episodes "Occupation" and "Precipice," which aired together as the third season opener.

In April 2006, Battlestar Galactica was among the winners of the 65th Annual Peabody Awards; Moore was among the writers and producers cited for "plotlines that are deeply personal and relatable, while never compromising their affinity and passion for science fiction."

Moore was quite vocal about the 2007–2008 Writers Guild of America strike, as his Battlestar Galactica series was one of the major flashpoints leading to the strike. Starting in August 2006, the Writers Guild ordered production to cease on the Battlestar Galactica: The Resistance series of webisodes which had been produced as a link between the show's second and third seasons. Tension over this would last throughout the third season. Battlestar Galactica was, along with other popular series such as Lost and Heroes, one of the shows at the forefront of the debate over "new media" revenues, as the series was extensively downloaded from iTunes and recouped much of its production costs from high DVD sales as opposed to direct ratings. It was also among the most time-shifted series on television, which the Nielsen ratings system does not count.

Moore's directorial debut was scheduled to be the first episode of Battlestar Galactica following the final season's mid-season cliffhanger, which he would also have written. Though the writers' strike halted production on the fourth season of Battlestar Galactica, work resumed and the show concluded on March 20, 2009. When the Writers Guild began their strike, Moore felt it was wrong to continue to communicate to fans using the "official" blog he maintained on the Scifi Channel website. As a result, he chose to start a personal website and blog, rondmoore.com, so that he could continue to freely comment on the situation without violating the terms of his membership in the Writers Guild. When the strike ended, Moore continued his commentary via his personal web site and blog.

=== Caprica (2010) ===
With the success of Battlestar Galactica, the Sci Fi Channel announced in April 2006 that Moore and Eick would be producing a spin-off called Caprica with 24 scriptwriter Remi Aubuchon and NBC Universal Television Studio. Moore later said in interviews that he and Eick had begun toying with the idea of a spin-off series as early as the beginning of the second season. The show was set 58 years before the events of Battlestar Galactica and depicted the creation of the Cylon race and the emergence of a terrorist group which apparently worships the same monotheistic god later worshipped by the Cylons. The Caprica series premiere was released on DVD in 2009 and began airing in January 2010. Moore contributed to the pilot made-for-TV movie, then handed off control to new head writer Jane Espenson. Syfy canceled the show mid-run on October 27, 2010, before its first season had finished airing, citing low ratings. The remaining five episodes, of the twenty produced for season one, were burned off in a marathon on January 4, 2011.

=== Unproduced pitches and failed pilots (2009–2013) ===
In April 2009, Moore, along with several other Battlestar Galactica alumni, made a cameo appearance in the CSI: Crime Scene Investigation episode "A Space Oddity." The episode was directed by Michael Nankin (who directed a number of Galactica episodes), written by Bradley Thompson and David Weddle (who both started their TV writing careers on Deep Space Nine, and worked as writer/producers on Galactica) and based on a story by Naren Shankar (who went to school with Moore and started his writing career on Star Trek: The Next Generation). In the episode, Moore has one line of dialogue as he portrays an irate audience member at a science fiction convention, yelling at the (fictional) producer of a dark-and-gritty remake of a beloved cult series. Several of his Battlestar Galactica colleagues including Grace Park and Rekha Sharma appear in non-speaking cameos, while Kate Vernon is a major guest star in the episode.

Moore also developed a pilot for Fox called Virtuality. It aired on June 26, 2009, and was not picked up. Virtuality was the first show developed under the banner of Moore's new personal production company, "Tall Ship Productions".

Moore worked on the script for the companion/prequel film of the 1982 John Carpenter film, The Thing. His screenplay was scrapped late in 2009 and rewritten by Eric Heisserer, writer of the 2010 A Nightmare on Elm Street. The Thing began production in March 2010 and was released in October 2011.

In March 2010, following the mixed reception of the first half of Caprica's first season, SyFy channel approached Moore to produce another Battlestar Galactica spin-off. The show was entitled Battlestar Galactica: Blood & Chrome, and was to feature a young William Adama's experiences in the First Cylon War. The series was originally designed as a series of webisodes, but with the cancellation of Caprica, Blood & Chrome was slated to become a full television series without any direct involvement from Moore.

In May 2010, Moore signed a two-year deal with Sony Pictures TV to create and executive produce series projects for broadcast and cable through his production company, Tall Ship Productions. By late 2010 this resulted in two of Moore's pitches being purchased by major TV networks for potential development into pilot episodes. The first was a remake of The Wild Wild West purchased by CBS. The second was purchased by NBC and called The McCulloch, an action-adventure series about the crew of a US Coast Guard vessel as they travel the world, to be co-produced by NBC-Universal and Sony. But neither of these projects made it to the screen.

In 2011, Moore was commissioned by Lucasfilm's Rick McCallum to write scripts for a Star Wars live action TV series, which was being developed for ABC.

Moore developed a series for NBC in 2011 which had been described as "Harry Potter for grown-ups," and it was confirmed on March 3, 2011, that the new show would be called 17th Precinct. Tricia Helfer, Jamie Bamber, and James Callis had signed up for the new series which would have centered around cops at the local 17th Precinct in the fictional city of Excelsior, with Moore writing the pilot. On May 13, 2011, it was confirmed that NBC had decided not to pick up the series.

On August 30, 2011, it was announced that ABC bought Moore's pitch for Hangtown, a Western drama series. The series was co-created by Ron D. Moore and former Caprica writer Matt Roberts. Hangtown is described as "a Western with procedural elements" that takes place in a frontier town in the early 1900s grappling with the development of the railroad. The potential series would revolve around the town's old-fashioned veteran marshal who solves crimes by drawing on instinct and experience, who butt heads with the young new East Coast crime-solving doctor who relies on emerging forensics and rational inquiry. Added to the mix is a young female writer who has come to the west to write pulp stories about stereotyped "Wild West" crime, to send back to big city dime-novel publishers back East. Tall Ship Productions announced on Twitter on October 18, 2011, that Justin Lin had signed on to direct a potential pilot episode of Hangtown, in the event that ABC officially orders it. In an interview with Wire.com on September 29, 2012, Moore confirmed that his The Wild Wild West reboot for CBS and Hangtown had been passed on.

Moore had a cameo appearance in a Battlestar Galactica-themed sketch of the January 2012 Portlandia episode entitled "One Moore Episode," where he plays an unknown actor who has never seen Battlestar Galactica. The episode also features a character named Ronald D. Moore who is mistaken for the TV producer.

On November 11, 2011, sci-fi news website io9.com ran an editorial about Moore, lamenting that "none of his post-BSG projects has really taken off. It's been a couple years since Moore's writing has appeared on our screens."

In 2012, it was reported that a TV series adaptation of A Knight's Tale was in development by American Broadcasting Company, written by Moore.

=== Helix (2014–2015) ===
On January 16, 2013, Deadline announced that Moore would return to the SyFy Channel as executive producer of a new series Helix. The project was "written on spec" by Cameron Porsandeh. Helix was described as being "about a team of scientists investigating a possible disease outbreak at an Arctic research facility who find themselves trying to protect the world from annihilation." SyFy Channel made a 13-episode direct-to-series order (i.e., without waiting to produce a pilot episode), and it began airing on SyFy on January 10, 2014. While the marketing heavily billed Moore's involvement in the project, he only contributed as a consultant at the opening pitch meetings, and was not the creator or showrunner – thus his actual involvement in the project was very limited. The series was cancelled after two seasons due to record low ratings.

=== Outlander (2014–2026) ===
In June 2012, io9.com reported that Moore had started developing a TV adaptation of Diana Gabaldon's Outlander book series. On November 6, 2012, Deadline reported that the premium subscription channel Starz had closed a deal to produce and air the series. The show began its first run on August 9, 2014, and was renewed for its second season which was based on Dragonfly in Amber, the second novel in the eight-book series. He was joined on the production by a fellow Deep Space Nine contributor, producer Ira Steven Behr.

The second season, consisting of 13 episodes, premiered on April 9, 2016. The 13-episode third season, based on Voyager, aired from September to December 2017. The 13-episode fourth season, based on Drums of Autumn, aired from November 2018 to January 2019. The fifth season of 12 episodes, based on The Fiery Cross, aired from February to May 2020. The sixth season was based on A Breath of Snow and Ashes. A seventh season aired in 2023, with an eighth and final season commissioned.

=== For All Mankind (2019–present) and further shows ===
On December 15, 2017, it was announced that Apple had given a straight-to-series order for a space drama entitled For All Mankind created and written by Moore.

In 2021, he signed a deal with Disney via 20th Television. In 2024, before any shows finished production, he left Disney to return to Sony Pictures Television with an overall deal. In October, he was hired as the new writer, showrunner, and as an executive producer for Sony's God of War adaptation for Amazon Prime Video, replacing Mark Fergus, Hawk Ostby, and Rafe Judkins due to a change in creative direction.

== Filmography ==
Film writer

- Star Trek Generations (1994)
- Star Trek: First Contact (1996)
- Mission: Impossible 2 (2000) (Story only)

Television

Year	Title	Writer	Executive Producer	Developer	Notes
1989–1994	Star Trek: The Next Generation	Yes	No	No	27 episodes; Also script editor and producer
1993–1999	Star Trek: Deep Space Nine	Yes	Co-Executive	No	30 episodes
1995–2001	Star Trek: Voyager	Yes	Co-Executive	No	2 episodes
1999–2002	Roswell	Yes	No	No	10 episodes
2003–2005	Carnivàle	Yes	Yes	No	3 episodes
2003	Battlestar Galactica	Yes	Yes	Yes	Miniseries
2004	Touching Evil	Yes	No	No	Episode "Justine"
2004–2009	Battlestar Galactica	Yes	Yes	Yes	73 episodes
2009	Virtuality	Yes	Yes	No	TV movie
2009–2010	Caprica	Yes	Yes	Yes	19 episodes
2014–2026	Outlander	Yes	Yes	Yes	101 episodes
2014–2015	Helix	No	Yes	No	26 episodes
2017–2018	Electric Dreams	Yes	Yes	Yes	10 episodes
2019–present	For All Mankind	Yes	Yes	Yes	50 episodes
2025–present	Outlander: Blood of My Blood	No	Yes	No	10 episodes
2026	Star City	Yes	Yes	Yes	
TBA	God of War	Yes	Yes	Yes	Filming

Consulting producer

- Good vs Evil (1999–2000) (2 episodes)
- Men in Kilts: A Roadtrip with Sam and Graham (2023) (4 episodes)

Actor

- Portlandia (2012)

== Awards ==
Awards won by Ronald D. Moore showing year, association, category and work
Year	Association	Category	Work	Result
1994	Emmy Award	Outstanding Drama Series	Star Trek: The Next Generation	Nominated
1995	Hugo Award	Best Dramatic Presentation	Star Trek Generations	Nominated
1995	Hugo Award	Best Dramatic Presentation	Star Trek: The Next Generation (episode: "All Good Things...")	Won
1996	Hugo Award	Best Dramatic Presentation	Star Trek: Deep Space Nine (episode: "Trials and Tribble-ations")	Nominated
1997	Hugo Award	Best Dramatic Presentation	Star Trek: First Contact	Nominated
2005	Hugo Award	Hugo Award for Best Dramatic Presentation, Short Form	Battlestar Galactica (episode: "33")	Won
2005	Peabody Awards	Peabody Award	Battlestar Galactica	Won
2007	Emmy Award	Outstanding Writing for a Drama Series	Battlestar Galactica (episode: "Occupation/Precipice")	Nominated
2008	Emmy Award	Outstanding Special Class – Short-format Live-action Entertainment Programs	Battlestar Galactica: Razor Flashbacks (featurette #4)	Won
2009	Streamy Awards	Best Writing for a Dramatic Web Series	Battlestar Galactica: The Face of the Enemy	Won
2026	Sidewise Award for Alternate History	Special Achievement Award	For introducing alternate history to television audience with shows like For All Mankind and Star City	Won
