= Repentance (Star Trek: Voyager) =

- Star Trek: Voyager episode
- Episode no.: Season 7 Episode 13
- Directed by: Mike Vejar
- Story by: Mike Sussman; Robert Doherty
- Teleplay by: Robert Doherty
- Cinematography by: Marvin V. Rush
- Production code: 259
- Original air date: January 31, 2001

Guest appearances
- Jeff Kober - Iko; Tim deZarn - Yediq; F. J. Rio - Joleg; Greg Poland - Voyager Security Officer

Episode chronology
← Previous "Lineage"	Next → "Prophecy"
- Star Trek: Voyager season 7

"Repentance" is the 159th episode of the American science fiction television series Star Trek: Voyager airing on the UPN network. It is the 13th episode of the seventh season.

Set in the 24th century, the series follows the adventures of the Starfleet and Maquis crew of the starship USS Voyager after they were stranded in the Delta Quadrant far from the rest of the Federation. In this episode, Voyager assists a ship in distress and ends up ferrying its passengers, most of whom are criminals en route to their executions.

"Repentance" aired on the United Paramount Network (UPN) on January 31, 2001.

== Plot ==
Voyager responds to a distress call, beaming all the passengers off a Nygean ship which is about to explode. Most are sent to Voyager's cargo bay, but two of them – Iko and Joleg – are sent to sickbay, where one takes Seven of Nine (Jeri Lynn Ryan) hostage. He is forced away from Seven and attempts to take the Doctor (Robert Picardo) hostage. This fails as the Doctor, as a hologram, is invulnerable to a common knife.

It turns out the ship Voyager rescued was carrying prisoners to a facility where they are scheduled to be executed. Since there is no capital punishment in the Federation, the crew are uncomfortable with the situation, but the Prime Directive forbids them from interfering. They provide cages for the prisoners, who are treated brutally by the Nygean guards. Neelix (Ethan Phillips) insists that the prisoners must be fed and the Doctor insists they must receive proper medical care. Seven considers this a waste of resources, since the prisoners are going to be killed anyway, but the guards agree to allow the prisoners to have meals.

After a particularly brutal beating by a guard, Iko is seriously wounded. The Voyager guards are forced to rescue Iko by drawing weapons on the Nygean guards. Captain Janeway (Kate Mulgrew) subsequently orders Voyager's security personnel take over guarding the prisoners. The Nygeans protest but Janeway gives them no choice.

Iko undergoes a medical procedure in which Borg nanoprobes are injected into his body; not only do the probes repair his injuries, they also seem to have restored the parts of his brain responsible for empathy, and he begins to feel remorse for his crimes.

At first, Iko wants to be executed for all he has done, but he becomes close to Seven, who sees in him a reflection of her own struggles for atonement for all she did as a Borg. Since under Nygean law, the victim's family decides the punishment for all crimes, Iko eventually appeals to his own victim's family for leniency. He tells them that he is cured, is sorry for what he has done, and hopes to start a new life on Voyager. The family denies his request.

Meanwhile, Neelix becomes friendly with Joleg, who explains minority Benkarans are subjected to racial profiling by Nygeans. Joleg persuades Neelix to get a letter through to his brother, but this turns out to be a ruse - Joleg has hidden Voyager's coordinates inside the letter, and the ship is attacked by others of Joleg's race. Joleg has organized a prison break so his co-conspirators can free him, but the plot is foiled by the Voyager crew. Neelix, who understands he was being manipulated, turns his back on Joleg.

== Response ==
This episode's allegorical look at the American prison system was somewhat controversial with Trek fans, with some accusing it of being too liberal and some accusing it of being too conservative. The Iko plotline establishes that he was a sick man, and with diagnosis and treatment could have been a productive member of society. While Joleg's stories of racial profiling may be true, Joleg himself is revealed as a manipulative person, unworthy of Neelix's trust.

== Reception ==
SyFy recommends this episode for their Seven of Nine binge-watching guide.

== Home media releases ==
On December 21, 2003, this episode was released on DVD as part of a Season 7 boxset; Star Trek Voyager: Complete Seventh Season.
