= Dreadnought (Star Trek: Voyager) =

- Star Trek: Voyager episode
- Episode no.: Season 2 Episode 17
- Directed by: LeVar Burton
- Written by: Gary Holland
- Production code: 134
- Original air date: February 12, 1996

Guest appearances
- Raphael Sbarge - Michael Jonas; Nancy Hower - Ensign Samantha Wildman; Michael Spound - Lorum; Dan Kern - Kellum

Episode chronology
← Previous "Meld"	Next → "Death Wish"
- Star Trek: Voyager season 2

"Dreadnought" is the 33rd episode of Star Trek: Voyager, the 17th episode in the second season. The USS Voyager encounters a Cardassian weapon that is en route to destroy an innocent civilization in the Delta Quadrant due to sabotage by Chief Engineer B'Elanna during her time as a member of the Maquis. The episode aired on UPN on February 12, 1996.

== Overview ==
This episode is directed by LeVar Burton and written by Garry Holland. Guest stars include Raphael Sbarge, Nancy Hower, Michael Spound and Dan Kern. Actress Majel Barrett is the voice of the computer, with a co-star credit.

== Plot ==
B'Elanna's past catches up to her when Voyager encounters a Cardassian missile speeding through space in the Delta Quadrant.

Years ago, when she and Chakotay were members of the Maquis fighting the Cardassians, the Maquis got hold of a Cardassian missile and on her own initiative she reprogrammed it to strike Cardassian territory. The weapon, Dreadnought, was launched and never heard from again; it was thought to be destroyed. Voyager chances upon it here on the other side of the galaxy, and it is headed directly for a populated planet called Rakosa V. It must be stopped; millions of lives are at stake.

B'Elanna is struck with horror at the thought of her deception wiping out a civilization and she vows to stop Dreadnought at any cost. Meanwhile, the disgruntled Maquis Michael Jonas betrays Voyager′s crew by informing the Kazon of the situation. B'Elanna beams onto Dreadnought′s control deck to try to shut it down. This is a tough task, since she had originally armed the missile with a sophisticated battery of countermeasures to make it invincible. The missile's AI accuses B'Elanna of tampering with Dreadnought and working for the Cardassians. Dreadnought then lies to B'Elanna and she returns to the ship. She realizes she must find a loophole in her own plans in order to persuade the missile that it should stand down from its plan of attack. She engages in a match of wits against herself (Dreadnought was reprogrammed to speak with B'Elanna's voice, reflecting just some of the alterations B'Elanna herself had made to its programming) to stop the threat before it is too late. Captain Janeway is willing to destroy Voyager to save the millions of people on the planet. At the last minute B'Elanna cuts through Dreadnought's power core with a phaser and Voyager beams her out, banking away from the planet as the missile explodes.

== Reception ==
In 2020, SyFy Wire ranked this episode the 13th best episode of Star Trek: Voyager. They commend the episode as a "compelling and tense hour", remarking that it has "some of the most harrowing scenes in all of Trek history."

In 2021, Tor.com gave it nine out ten, remarking that "Dawson’s dual performance as Torres and the Dreadnought computer is simply amazing".

== See also ==
- Warhead (Star Trek: Voyager)
