= Equinox (Star Trek: Voyager) =

Two-part episode of Star Trek: Voyager

- Star Trek: Voyager episodes
- Episode nos.: Season 5 and 6 Episodes 26 and 1
- Directed by: David Livingston
- Story by: Rick Berman; Brannon Braga; Joe Menosky
- Teleplay by: Brannon Braga; Joe Menosky
- Production codes: 220 and 221
- Original air dates: May 26, 1999; September 22, 1999

Guest appearances
- John Savage as Captain Rudy Ransom; Titus Welliver as Lieutenant Commander Maxwell Burke; Olivia Birkelund as Ensign Marla Gilmore; Eric Steinberg as Ankari; Steven Dennis as Thompson; Scarlett Pomers as Naomi Wildman; Rick Worthy as Noah Lessing

Episode chronology
| ← Previous "Warhead" | Next → "Survival Instinct" |

"Equinox" is a two-part episode of the science fiction television series Star Trek: Voyager, the cliffhanger between the fifth and sixth seasons. This television episode features a 24th-century spacecraft, the USS Voyager, lost on the opposite side of the Galaxy as Earth, the Delta Quadrant, and they must make their way home.

In this installment, they encounter another Starfleet starship, the USS Equinox, also stranded in the Delta Quadrant. This was presented in two parts, but aired several months apart, with part one airing on UPN on May 26, 1999 and the conclusion on September 22, 1999.

The cliffhanger closed out season five, while the opener for season six was the conclusion. The two-part episode features Captain Ransom, played by actor John Savage, as well as several other guest stars.

Part 1 is also the last episode of Star Trek: Voyager to air before the Star Trek: Deep Space Nine series finale, "What You Leave Behind". The broadcast of Part 2 in September 1999 marked the first time since 1994 that only one Star Trek series was on the air.

== Plot ==
=== Part 1 ===
The crew of the USS Voyager is surprised to receive an emergency hail from another Federation starship, the Equinox, in the Delta Quadrant. They arrive to find the damaged ship under attack by nucleogenic lifeforms. Under advice from the Equinox captain, Rudy Ransom, Captain Kathryn Janeway has Voyager extend its shields around both ships, quelling the attack, though the creatures continue to bear down on the shields, weakening them over time.

Janeway and Ransom discuss how both their ships had been pulled into the Delta Quadrant, five years earlier, by The Caretaker. Ransom shares that they found a wormhole and made enhancements to their warp engines, explaining how this allowed the smaller and slower Equinox to travel the same 40,000 light years as Voyager on its return to Earth. Of Ransom's crew, only 12 are still alive.

While surveying, Voyager's crew finds an area of the ship they cannot access due to intentional overrides by the Equinox crew. Janeway sends the holographic Doctor to the area, where he finds the Equinox crew has been harvesting bio-energy from the nucleogenic creatures, slaughtering dozens of creatures to enhance their warp drive, traversing 10,000 light years in two weeks.

The Equinox crew know that they can reach Earth within weeks if they use more creatures. They then attack Voyager, stealing a shield generator and escape, kidnapping Seven of Nine along the way. Voyager, unable to raise shields, suddenly finds itself under attack from the angry nucleogenic creatures.

=== Part 2 ===
On Voyager, 15 crew members have been killed or wounded because of Ransom and his crew. On Equinox, Seven has encrypted the codes accessing its warp controls, delaying their plan to murder another 63 aliens for fuel. After learning the Doctor in their sickbay is from Voyager, and erasing his ethical sub-routines as they did with their EMH, they tell him to probe Seven's brain to obtain the codes, knowing it could permanently incapacitate her.

Janeway starts taking the objective of stopping Ransom to extremes. She orders torpedoes to be fired on the Equinox, nearly kills an Equinox crew member during an interrogation, tractor beams an Ankari ship to strong-arm their cooperation, and relieves Chakotay from command when he questions her orders.

While the Doctor prepares to probe the incapacitated Seven's brain, he idly sings "Oh My Darling, Clementine" in a duet with her, rattling Ransom into realizing his error in having murdered multiple aliens and Voyager crew. He orders his crew to return the Equinox to Voyager, but Commander Max Burke leads the crew in a mutiny against Ransom. Ransom, supported by loyal crew member Ensign Marla Gilmore, transports the four mutineers they can access, as well as the Doctor and Seven, back to Voyager, while Burke and three other mutineers are killed by the aliens. After transporting Gilmore to Voyager, Ransom sacrifices himself by piloting the failing Equinox far enough away from Voyager to protect it from the resulting explosion.

As Voyager resumes its journey home, Janeway reinstates Chakotay to Commander and strips the five surviving Equinox crew members of their ranks while integrating them into Voyager's crew, telling them that they will work under heavy supervision until she personally deems them trustworthy. Seven promises to help the Doctor secure his ethical sub-routines from being deleted in the future.

== Reception ==
Radio Times ranked this the sixth best episode of Star Trek, especially for those unfamiliar with the franchise. Space.com rated "Equinox" as the ninth best Star Trek episode overall. Screen Rant rated "Equinox" tenth best of all Star Trek episodes to-date. They note the two-part episode for highlighting the struggle to maintain morality in difficult circumstances, including how to maintain morale, and the dangers of greed. They point out the episode explores concepts of trust and self-interest in difficult circumstances, such as Voyager's 75-year journey back to Earth after being cut-off from Starfleet. CBR ranked the "Equinox" pair as the eleventh best episodic saga of Star Trek overall. ScreenRant ranked "Equinox" the 15th best episode of all Star Trek franchise television episodes. Gizmodo ranked the "Equinox" pair 23rd out of the top 100 Star Trek episodes. A regional newspaper of Cleveland ranked "Equinox" as the 25th greatest episode of Star Trek (prior to Star Trek: Discovery'). The Hollywood Reporter ranked Equinox 30th best out all Star Trek episodes.

Cinema Blend rated this the best episode of Star Trek: Voyager. The Hollywood Reporter ranked it the second greatest Star Trek: Voyager episode behind the Season 4 two-parter "Year of Hell". SyFy Wire ranked "Equinox" the ninth best episode of Star Trek: Voyager; they said that the plot was worthy of a movie and keeps the audience guessing about the outcome. SyFy rated it among the top ten of Voyager episodes. In Wired's Star Trek: Voyager binge-watching guide for the show, they recommended not skipping "Equinox".

TheGamer ranked it as one of the 25 creepiest episodes of all Star Trek series, and they found the alien attackers to be "lethal, vengeful… they never give up". Slate ranked Captain Ransom one of the ten best villains in the Star Trek franchise, and also that the episode was one of the best.

== Novel ==
The episode was also adapted to a novel, Equinox, by Diane Carey, based on the television episode. It was published by Pocket Books in 1999.

== Releases ==
The first part of this episode "Equinox, Part I" was released on LaserDisc in Japan on June 22, 2001, as part of 5th Season Vol. 2, which included episodes from "Dark Frontier" to "Equinox, Part I". The episode had two audio tracks, English and also Japanese. This set had 6 double sided 12" optical discs giving a total runtime of 552 minutes. This was the last season released on LaserDisc, so only the first half of "Equinox" was offered on LaserDisc.

Both parts of "Equinox" were released with "The Killing Game" on VHS in one set. Two other VHS tapes had one part each of "Equinox". One tape paired Part I with "Warhead", and another tape paired Part II with "Survival Instinct".

On November 9, 2004, "Equinox, Part I" was released as part of the Season 5 DVD box set of Star Trek: Voyager. The box set includes seven DVD optical discs with all the episodes in Season 5 with some extra features, and episodes have a Dolby Digital 5.1 surround sound audio track.
