= Riddles (Star Trek: Voyager) =

- Star Trek: Voyager episode
- Episode no.: Season 6 Episode 6
- Directed by: Roxann Dawson
- Story by: André Bormanis
- Teleplay by: Robert Doherty
- Production code: 227
- Original air date: November 3, 1999

Guest appearance
- Mark Moses - Naroq

Episode chronology
← Previous "Alice"	Next → "Dragon's Teeth"
- Star Trek: Voyager season 6

"Riddles" is the 126th episode of Star Trek: Voyager, the sixth episode of the sixth season. Roxann Dawson makes her directorial debut. The episode follows a crewmember of a spaceship in the 24th century who has his mind attacked by aliens; upon his return, his shipmates try to help him recover. Set in the Star Trek universe, the episode takes advantage of previously established lore about Vulcans, to explore emotions, recovery, and friendship.

The episode was written by Andre Bormanis (story) and Robert Doherty (teleplay), and aired on UPN on November 3, 1999. Bormanis was also the Star Trek science consultant.

Actor Mark Moses guest stars as the alien Naroq.

== Plot ==
Tuvok and Neelix have returned from a diplomatic mission. Tuvok scans the Delta Flyer, discovering a cloaking frequency, and suffers neurological damage after an attack by an invisible alien called a "Ba'Neth". He experiences cognitive impairment, memory loss, personality changes, and loss of emotional control. With help from the race they had just met with, Voyager receives a deputy investigator with theories on the terminally cloaked alien race, allowing Voyager to expose them.

Neelix resolves to help Tuvok recover. In the process, they develop a deep friendship, one that Neelix has desired but Tuvok has till late denied. As Tuvok's recovery ensues, he slowly comes to recall details of the encounter, and to discover new abilities in himself such as preparing desserts and enjoying jazz.

The information locked in Tuvok's damaged mind is essential to locating the cloaked alien race. Neelix must also work with the conflicts between Tuvok's needs, Neelix's own desires in his new friendship, and the need of Voyager's crew for their formerly expert tactical officer Tuvok.

Following Captain Janeway's encouragement, Tuvok eventually draws the cloaking frequency in icing on a cake he prepared, and the crew is able to produce this frequency through the deflector. They expose a cloaked space station, and eventually negotiate for details on the weapon used on Tuvok. Tuvok slowly makes a full recovery, but still appears to retain a bit of the illogical self he briefly knew.

== Analysis ==
This episode was noted for the use of a medical history to help with a diagnosis, pointing out how the EMH checks Tuvok's medical history.

== Reception ==
Keith DeCandido of Tor.com rated the episode 6 out of 10.

== Releases ==
This episode was released on DVD as part of a season 6 boxset on December 7, 2004.
