= Prophecy (Star Trek: Voyager) =

- Star Trek: Voyager episode
- Episode no.: Season 7 Episode 14
- Directed by: Terry Windell
- Story by: Larry Nemecek; J. Kelley Burke; Raf Green; Kenneth Biller
- Teleplay by: Mike Sussman; Phyllis Strong
- Production code: 260
- Original air date: February 7, 2001

Guest appearances
- Sherman Howard - T'Greth; Paul Eckstein - Morak; Wren T. Brown - Kohlar; Peggy Jo Jacobs - Ch'Rega

Episode chronology
| ← Previous "Repentance" | Next → "The Void" |
- Star Trek: Voyager season 7

"Prophecy" is the 160th episode of the TV series Star Trek: Voyager, the 14th episode of the seventh season. It deals with Klingon religious beliefs and stem cells. The starship Voyager, making its way home after being flung to the other side of the galaxy, encounters an old Klingon starship.

"Prophecy" aired on the United Paramount Network (UPN) on February 7, 2001.

== Plot ==
An antique Klingon D7-class vessel decloaks and attacks Voyager. Using a metaphasic scan, Seven of Nine calculates the position of the ship, allowing Tuvok to fire on it and disable their cloaking device. The captain of the Klingon ship, Kohlar, refers to the Federation as "sworn enemies of the Empire". Kohlar does not believe Kathryn Janeway when she says that the Federation and the Empire have been at peace for eighty years. However, when Kohlar sees B'Elanna Torres - who is pregnant - he abruptly changes his mind. Kohlar has his crew fake a core breach on his ship so that all the Klingons aboard, over 200, are transported to Voyager. When he is confronted by Janeway about this, he explains that he believes Torres' unborn child is the prophesied "Kuvah'magh", the savior of the Klingon people, the one whom Kohlar's ancestors left the Klingon world in a multi-generational voyage in order to meet. The elder Klingons are very skeptical, especially because Torres is only half Klingon and thus her daughter will be only one-quarter Klingon. Other Klingons constantly bother Torres when she is working, prompting her to beam from place to place. The Voyager crew is forced to share quarters to make room for the Klingons, and Tuvok is assigned Neelix as a roommate.

T'Greth, one of the Klingons, challenges Tom Paris, B'Elanna's husband, to a duel to the death, which Paris accepts. At Janeway's insistence, however, T'Greth and Paris agree to a non-lethal duel with blunted bat'leths. To everyone's surprise, T'Greth loses the duel.

It turns out that T'Greth suffers from a seemingly incurable disease known as Nehret, which afflicts all Klingons aboard Kohlar's ship, and now Torres and her unborn child as well. T'Greth convinces some of the other Klingons to take over Voyager. After much fighting, the Voyager crew retakes the ship. The Doctor then comes up with a cure by using stem cells from B'Elanna's baby.

The Klingons relocate to an M-class planet while Paris and Torres agree to consider "Kuvah'magh" as a possible name for the baby.

A subplot concerns Harry Kim not wanting to mate with Ch'Rega, a Klingon woman who lusts after him because he broke-up a fight between her and another Klingon over food. However, he is not attracted to her in return. Neelix offers to take her off Harry's hands. Harry pretends with Neelix (in her presence) to be threatened that Neelix will cut the food from his stomach if he was seen taking more than his share of food again, and Ch'Rega is most impressed. Neelix and Ch'Rega have sex in Tuvok's quarters, leaving the place an utter mess. Tuvok tells him to get out after seeing the destruction.

== Reception ==
In 2019, Den of Geek included this episode on a binge watching guide that included a roadmap of episodes, that although not typically achieving high ratings, might still be entertaining to some.

== Home media releases ==
On December 21, 2003, this episode was released on DVD as part of a Season 7 boxset; Star Trek Voyager: Complete Seventh Season.
