= Precipice (Battlestar Galactica) =

- Battlestar Galactica episode
- Episode no.: Season 3 Episode 2
- Directed by: Sergio Mimica-Gezzan
- Written by: Ronald D. Moore
- Original air date: October 6, 2006

Guest appearances
- Richard Hatch as Tom Zarek; Rick Worthy as Number Four; Callum Keith Rennie as Number Two; Kate Vernon as Ellen Tigh; Matthew Bennett as Number Five; Dean Stockwell as Number One; Michael Trucco as Samuel Anders; Luciana Carro as Louanne "Kat" Katraine; Brad Dryborough as Louis Hoshi; Madeline Parker as Kacey Brynn; Dominic Zamprogna as Jammer; Ryan McDonell as Eammon "Gonzo" Pike; Larissa Stadnichuk as Suicide bomber

Episode chronology
← Previous "Occupation"	Next → "Exodus"
- Battlestar Galactica season 3

"Precipice" is the second part of the third season premiere and 35th episode of the re-imagined American science fiction drama television series Battlestar Galactica. The episode was written by re-imagined creator Ronald D. Moore, and directed by Sergio Mimica-Gezzan. It first aired on October 6, 2006 on the Sci-Fi Channel along with the preceding episode "Occupation". In "Precipice", the Cylons respond to the suicide attack in the previous episode by rounding up over 200 civilians believed to be affiliated with the resistance, and later decide to have them executed. Meanwhile, Galactica is to send a squadron to meet with the resistance on New Caprica. Unlike most episodes, it does not include a survivor count.

Since "Occupation" revolved around the resistance, "Precipice" focused more on the New Caprica Police and the role of Jammer (Dominic Zamprogna) in it. The producers also decided to release the Sharon model imprisoned on Galactica. During the writing process, Moore included references to Seinfeld and The Great Escape. The episode was seen by 2.2 million viewers and received universal acclaim from critics. In addition, Moore's writing of the episode was nominated for an Emmy and Writers Guild of America awards.

== Plot ==
In response to the suicide bombing of a New Caprica Police (NCP) ceremony, the Cylons order a crackdown against the insurgency. Many resistance members start to disagree about the legitimacy of the suicide bombings, but leader Colonel Saul Tigh (Michael Hogan) continues to orchestrate them. Meanwhile, in an attempt to get Kara "Starbuck" Thrace (Katee Sackhoff) to love him, Leoben Conoy (Callum Keith Rennie) presents her with a toddler named Kacey (Madeline Parker), of whom Leoben claims Starbuck is the mother, as a result of her time on Caprica in "The Farm". Leoben leaves her alone with the toddler, but Starbuck refuses to play with her. When she leaves Kacey unattended, however, Kacey injures herself falling down the stairs. As Kacey is recovering, Starbuck has a change of heart and prays to the Lords of Kobol not to let her die.

In a move against the insurgency, the Cylons decide to have the NCP arrest 200 civilians they believe to be affiliated with the resistance. Headed by James "Jammer" Lyman, a former Galactica deckhand and resistance fighter, most of the arrests take place during the night. Those being arrested include Laura Roslin (Mary McDonnell), Tom Zarek (Richard Hatch) and Cally Henderson Tyrol (Nicki Clyne). Learning of Cally's arrest, Jammer attempts to get her released by Boomer, but Boomer is unable to help. After another suicide bombing at a power station, the Cylons decide to have the prisoners executed, but require President Gaius Baltar's (James Callis) signature. When he refuses to sign, an Aaron Doral (Matthew Bennett) copy forces him to at gunpoint. Caprica-Six (Tricia Helfer) attempts to stop him, but Doral shoots her in the head. Baltar signs the document. Meanwhile, Ellen Tigh (Kate Vernon) learns from Cavil (Dean Stockwell) that he only released her husband Saul (Michael Hogan) because the Cylons know he is leading the resistance. He informs Ellen that unless she tells the Cylons where the resistance leaders will be meeting next, he will imprison Saul once more. Reluctantly, Ellen discovers where the resistance plans to meet with members from the colonial fleet.

On board Galactica, Admiral William Adama (Edward James Olmos) appoints their Cylon prisoner Sharon Agathon (Grace Park) a Colonial officer and sends her to the planet to liaise with the resistance. When she arrives to meet with resistance members, Centurions attack, having learned of the meeting place from the intelligence Ellen provided. Simultaneously, the 200 human prisoners are being transported to a location by the Cylons and NCP. A masked Jammer, realizing they are to be executed, saves Cally by releasing her in secret and telling her to run. As she runs away, the sound of gunfire is heard.

== Production ==
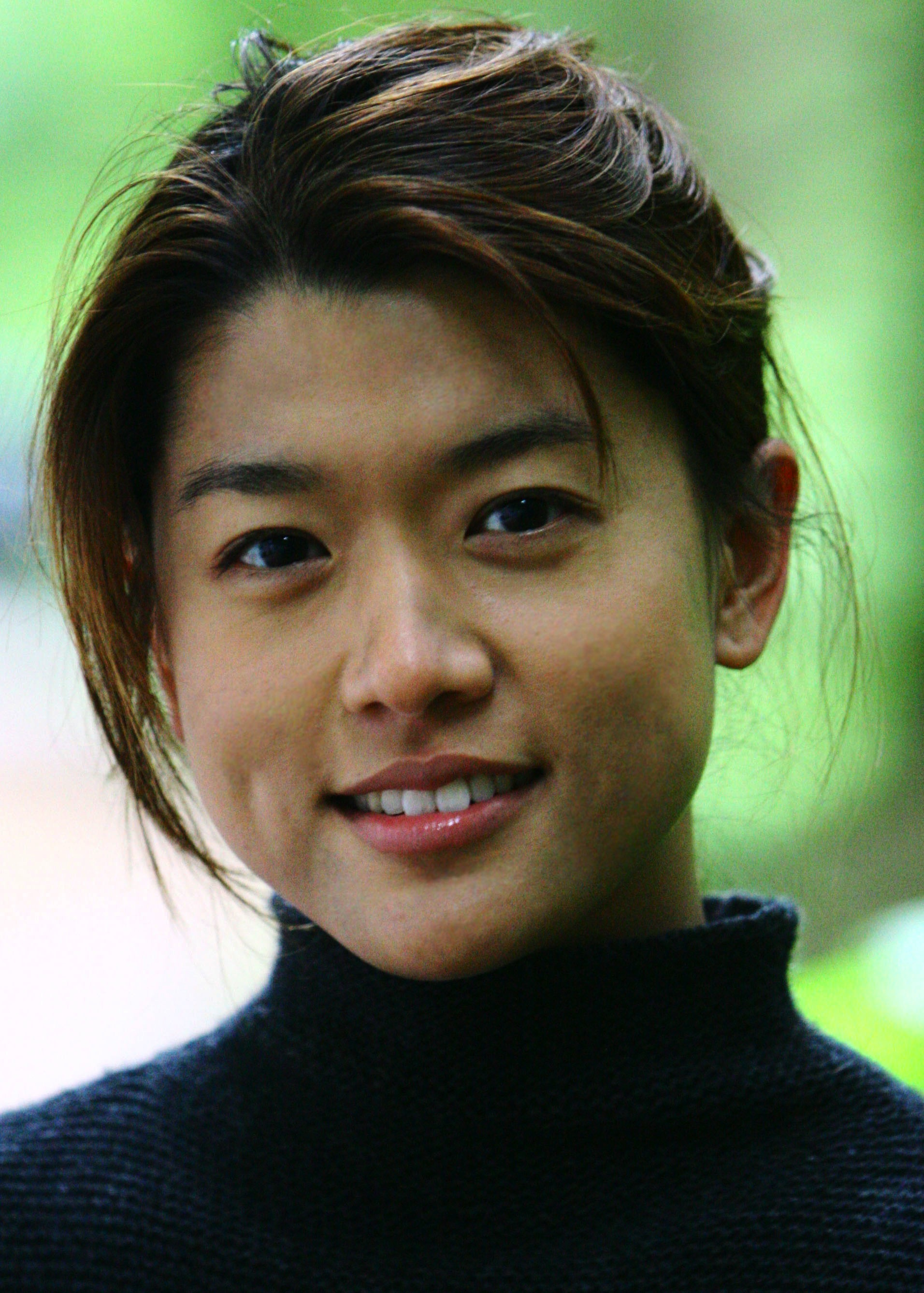
The producers decided to have one of the Sharon models, portrayed by Grace Park (pictured), who was imprisoned onboard Galactica for the majority of the second season, to be released and became part of the crew.

Since the previous episode "Occupation" focused on the resistance, writer Ronald D. Moore wanted the second part to focus more on Jammer's role within the NCP, as he wanted to personalize somebody working for the police force. He also wanted to make Tigh know he's wrong with launching suicide bombers, but has to do so if he believes doing so will defeat the Cylons. This is also Tigh's principal trait and role in the series. Moore stated "why is Colonel Tigh on Galactica? Why does Adama keep him around? Because when the chips are down, and they are way down, baby, in this situation, when you are in a foxhole, who do you want next to you? You want Colonel Tigh 'cause he is gonna get your ass out of there." The scene where Baltar speaks to an imprisoned Roslin about the suicide bombings was one of Moore's favourite scenes, as he wanted the audience to be unsure who to "root for," since Baltar is the biggest Cylon collaborator among the humans, but Roslin seemingly supports the bombings.

After a Number Eight (Sharon) Cylon model was imprisoned onboard Galactica for the majority of the second season, the producers decided they needed to have her released, as they believed the storyline ran its course, and make her worthy for Adama's trust. "The swirl", a sex position Ellen Tigh uses, was a reference to Seinfeld, a comedy series Moore was a fan of. The sequence leading up to the Cylon Centurions lining up to execute the prisoners was an homage to The Great Escape, particularly the scene featuring the death of Richard Attenborough's character from the Nazis after stopping the truck he was in, and telling him to take a break, at which point he was executed.

Madeline Parker was cast as Kacey Brynn. Parker's performance impressed the producers, as they believed she was "one of the better child actors" they ever worked with, since casting them, especially at a younger age, was not easy. The one problem they had with Parker however, was filming her lying injured on the stairs. In the scene where the NCP arrest civilians at night, the idea of using night vision, which did not come from the original script, came from director Sergio Mimica-Gezzan. Real night scopes were used to ensure the authenticity of the effect. One of the main visual effects of the episode was another suicide bombing which was caught on camera. Moore stated to have "tortured the visual effects guys about [it] quite a bit," because the camera footage was in black and white and the visual quality of the explosion had to be degraded to match the footage.

Much like "Occupation", "Precipice" also features scenes filmed on the Colonial One set featuring several copies of the same Cylon models. Furthermore, Mimica Gezzan decided to shoot a 360-degree angle around the set, requiring additional digital duplication. The actors had to change their clothes between every take, which normally took as long as 30 minutes, after including time for touch ups on hair and makeup. The countryside of New Caprica was featured more towards the end of the episode. The producers found it a challenge to differentiate New Caprica from Caprica, the name of the planet New Caprica was named after following the holocaust from the miniseries, and featured extensively again during the first season, and both planets were filmed on location in temperate British Columbia forests.

== Reception ==
"Occupation" and "Precipice" were originally meant to be released as two separate episodes; however, the producers decided to merge them to be released as a two-hour broadcast. The reasoning was partly due to the third episode "Exodus", which became too long and split to a two-part episode, and the producers did not wish to stretch the New Caprica storyline to several weeks. The two-hour season-three premiere was first broadcast on the Sci Fi Channel in the United States on Friday, October 6, 2006 between 9 pm and 11 pm. After its original broadcast, the two-hour episode attracted a household rating of 1.8, equaling a total of 2.2 million viewers. Ratings were an increase of two per cent in total viewing from the average of the second half of the second season.

"Precipice" received positive reviews from critics. Keith McDuffee of TV Squad felt that Sharon Agathon coming to the fleet was a "surprising development" and the cliffhanger was "unbelievable", adding "are the writers actually crazy enough to mass kill so many main characters to the series? Is it possible at all that they can actually get out of this?" Eric Goldman of IGN rated the episode a "masterful" 10 out of 10, stating "watching the season premiere of Battlestar Galactica is a great reminder that this is truly still the best show on television." Ian Berriman of SFX reacted positively towards the episode, stating "Although there are a couple of great surprises in this episode – Casey, the Great Escape-homaging finale – the highlights are a fistful of fabulous face-offs: Baltar discussing the bombing with Roslin; Roslin questioning Tigh's methods; Apollo telling Adama that his plan is madness. James Callis's performance as the haggard, tortured Baltar is outstanding." Berriman rated the episode five stars out of five. Patrick Sauriol of UGO felt that although it was set a year since "Lay Down Your Burdens", it "hasn't lost a thing by jumping ahead," and that the episode, along with "Occupation", "confirm that it's still the best show on television." Sauriol graded both episodes an A-. Television Without Pity gave the episode an A+, a higher grade than the previous episode.

In 2007, the episode was nominated for a 59th Primetime Emmy Awards for "Outstanding Writing in a Drama Series", but lost to HBO's The Sopranos series finale "Made in America". "Precipice" was also nominated for a Writers Guild of America Award for best Episodic Drama. However, the episode lost out to the pilot episode of Big Love.
