= Minefield (Star Trek: Enterprise) =

- Star Trek: Enterprise episode
- Episode no.: Season 2 Episode 3
- Directed by: James A. Contner
- Written by: John Shiban
- Production code: 203
- Original air date: October 2, 2002

Guest appearances
- Tim Glenn - Med Tech; Elizabeth Magness - Injured Crewman

Episode chronology
← Previous "Carbon Creek"	Next → "Dead Stop"
- Star Trek: Enterprise season 2

"Minefield" is the twenty-ninth episode (production #203) of the science fiction television series Star Trek: Enterprise, the third episode of the second season. In this episode, which aired on UPN on October 2, 2002, the spaceship the Enterprise is rocked by an explosion, and the crew tries to deal with the situation.

== Plot ==
Captain Archer is in the captain's private mess, trying, unsuccessfully, to get to know Lieutenant Reed better. Meanwhile, Enterprise nears an uncharted and seemingly uninhabited planet for closer observation. Its proximity triggers a cloaked mine, heavily damaging the ship and flooding Sickbay with injured crew members. Soon, another cloaked mine is detected as it attaches itself to the hull, but it does not immediately detonate for some reason. With the core already damaged, it is feared that a further detonation will totally disable the vessel. Reed then goes EV to try to disarm it. As a backup plan, Archer orders Commander Tucker to prepare to detach and jettison the affected section of hull plating.

Initially Reed's efforts seem to be working, but an alien vessel decloaks, and fires warning shots. Ensign Mayweather steers the ship out of the minefield. During the maneuvers, a jolt accidentally activates another magnetic grappling arm that impales Reed's leg before attaching itself to the spaceship's hull, thus pinning him down. Archer then dons an EVA suit and attempts to disarm the mine under Reed's direction. While disarming the mine, Archer and Reed discuss command style, with Reed advocating a more rigid approach where members of the crew do not socialize with higher-ranking officers.

Enterprise then makes first contact with the Romulan Star Empire when two Warbirds decloak and demand that they jettison the mine with Reed attached. Knowing that any attempt to cut the arm would set off the mine, Reed becomes insistent on sacrificing himself to save Enterprise. Archer returns to the ship and requests two shuttle hatches from a puzzled Commander Tucker, also ordering him to detach the hull plate as planned. As the plates and the attached mine float off, he severs the spike holding Reed. This arms the mine, but Reed and Archer are also able to shield themselves from the resulting explosion. Enterprise then collects the crewmen before warping away from the Romulans.

== Production ==
This is the first episode credited to writer John Shiban. He joined Enterprise having previously worked on The X-Files for seven years. Shiban said it took some adjustment to write for the optimistic future of Star Trek, but that similar to his past work, "space is a scary place, there are creepy aliens and we don't know if we're going to succeed." Shiban was in part inspired by the television series Danger UXB, which was set during World War II and was about team dealing with unexploded bombs. Developing the episode, they decided Malcolm Reed would be the best character to try and pin down both literally and figuratively. Shiban had planned to use an unknown alien species, but the Romulans were suggested and it seemed like a perfect fit for the story, as the aliens needed to be unhelpful and unwilling to communicate. Captain Kirk in the original series was credited as the first human to look a Romulan eye-to-eye, so Rick Berman was careful not to contradict that, and the Romulans remained unseen throughout the episode. Nonetheless, the introduction of Romulan cloaking technology 100 years before James T. Kirk and Federation outposts would encounter it—something Mr. Spock only theorized was even possible—is considered a clear canon violation. They also thought it was important to recognize that the ship had been badly damaged, and not simply have the ship repaired and back to normal the next week. This led to the idea for the next episode "Dead Stop", where they must seek out help to repair the ship.

The episode filmed for a week and a half, from July 19 until July 31, 2002. Visual effects producer Dan Curry came in for two days during the next episode, to direct additional exterior ship shots with Dominic Keating.

Filming was complicated by the bulky environmental suits, and the simulation of zero-gravity. Dominic Keating said: "The space suits are the mother of all costumes. They weigh a ton. They are thick rubber. You sweat. I lost five pounds that week." He also said Bakula seriously put his back out. Despite the difficulties he was pleased with how the episode turned out: "it meshed together really well. It delivered some good character moments and good action too."

== Technology ==
"Minefield" is noted for its presentation of Star Trek's cloaking technology to a space mine.

== Reception ==
"Minefield" was first broadcast October 2, 2002, on UPN. According to Nielsen a rating of 3.5 and a share of six, meaning 3.5 percent of households in America with TV sets saw the episode, and 6% of households watching television at the time were watching the show. This translated into 5.2 million viewers, an increase over the season premiere. UPN was struggling with low ratings compared to the same time the previous year, and UPN executives argued that the drop was because Buffy and Star Trek had enjoyed unusually strong debuts.

Michelle Erica Green at TrekToday praised Dominic Keating for giving "a truly excellent performance, subtle and moving" while also noting that Reed's "big selfless dramatic gesture was undoubtedly written to create drama in an otherwise formulaic episode that takes no risks," comparing the "ticking-time-bomb plot" to other "genre stories" like The Abyss and The Running Man. Green criticized the writers' failure to "explain space-peeing, like [in] Apollo 13" after risking "TMI syndrome by bringing up bodily functions usually neglected on Trek". She points out a possible continuity issue in that it "seems a bit early" in the "timeline of stealth development" for sophisticated Romulan cloaking technology, and grateful that they "somehow weren't interested in taking over pre-Federation Earth." Green concluded that, "Visually Minefield holds attention because the external images are superb -- the Romulan ships rising over Enterprise, the hull lighting, the design of the mine itself. It's also well-paced even if we could all guess the precise moment when the mine would re-arm itself..." comparing the outcome of the story to "Chekhov (the writer, not the Star Trek character) [who] once said that in any story, if there's a gun on the wall at the beginning, it should go off by the end."

In his 2022 rewatch, Keith DeCandido of Tor.com gave it eight out of ten. In 2021, The Digital Fix said this episode was one of the highlights from season two, and called it a "tense episode" and noting references to the Romulan Star Empire.

== Home media ==
The first home media release of "Minefield" was part of the season two DVD box set, released in the United States on July 26, 2005. A release on Blu-ray Disc for season two occurred on August 20, 2013.
