= Otta Wenskus =

German classical philologist (born 1955)

- Born: 29 May 1955 (age 71); Marburg (Lahn), West Germany
- Relatives: Reinhard Wenskus (father)

Academic background
- Education: University of Göttingen (PhD)

Academic work
- Discipline: Classical philologist
- Institutions: University of Innsbruck

Otta Wenskus (born 29 May 1955, in Marburg/Lahn) is a German classical philologist currently residing in Austria.

Wenskus is the daughter of historian Reinhard Wenskus. She studied Classical philology and linguistics at the Universities of Göttingen, Florence, and Lausanne. She acquired her Ph.D. in Göttingen in 1982. In 1985/86 she was maître de conférences at the University of Caen, and in 1987 Visiting Scholar at the Institute of the History of Mathematics at Brown University, Providence, Rhode Island.

She passed her habilitation in 1988. During the summer terms of 1990 and 1992 she was a guest professor at the Universities of Osnabrück and Jena respectively and, from 1990 to 1994, a Heisenberg scholar until her appointment as a full professor at the University of Innsbruck.

In 2025, she is professor emeritus at University of Innsbruck.

Her topics include history of science, particularly medicine and astronomy, linguistics, particularly code switching, gender studies, Latin epistolography, Dante, and the reception of classical antiquity in fantasy and science fiction, particularly Star Trek.

== Selected works ==
- Ringkomposition, anaphorisch-rekapitulierende Verbindung und anknüpfende Wiederholung im hippokratischen Corpus, Frankfurt 1982 (doctoral dissertation, Göttingen 1982), ISBN 388-3-2339-00.
- Astronomische Zeitangaben von Homer bis Theophrast. Hermes Einzelschriften 55, Stuttgart 1990 (habilitation thesis, Göttingen 1988), ISBN 351-5-0553-39.
- Emblematischer Codewechsel und Verwandtes in der lateinischen Prosa. Zwischen Nähesprache und Distanzsprache, Innsbruck 1998, ISBN 978-3-8512-4672-8.
- Umwege in die Vergangenheit : Star Trek und die griechisch-römische Antike, Innsbruck 2009, ISBN 978-3-7065-4661-4.
