= Soldiers of the Empire =

- Star Trek: Deep Space Nine episode
- Episode no.: Season 5 Episode 21
- Directed by: LeVar Burton
- Written by: Ronald D. Moore
- Production code: 519
- Original air date: April 28, 1997

Guest appearances
- J. G. Hertzler as Martok; David Graf as Leskit; Rick Worthy as Kornan; Sandra Nelson as Tavana; Scott Leva as Ortakin; Aron Eisenberg as Nog

Episode chronology
← Previous "Ferengi Love Songs"	Next → "Children of Time"
- Star Trek: Deep Space Nine season 5

"Soldiers of the Empire" is the 119th episode of the television series Star Trek: Deep Space Nine, the 21st episode of the fifth season. It was directed by LeVar Burton.

Set in the 24th century, the series follows the adventures of the crew of the Starfleet-run space station Deep Space Nine. In later seasons of the series, the United Federation of Planets comes into conflict with a hostile empire known as the Dominion; when the Dominion absorbs the nearby planet of Cardassia, the Federation forms an alliance with the Klingon Empire for mutual defense. This episode focuses on Klingon characters including Worf, a Klingon officer in Starfleet, and General Martok, the Klingon Empire's liaison to Deep Space Nine, as Martok takes command of a ship, only to find its crew demoralized by recent losses against the Dominion.

== Plot ==
Martok receives a message from the Klingon government stating that he has been assigned to retrieve a missing Klingon vessel, the B'Moth, lost several days ago. The Klingon High Council assigns the General a ship of his own, the Rotarran, to accomplish the mission. He departs Deep Space Nine along with his newly appointed First Officer, Worf, who has signed on to the mission at Martok's request. Worf's lover Jadzia Dax, a devotee of Klingon culture, joins them as the ship's Science Officer. The Rotarran is Martok's first command since his escape from a Dominion prison camp, and he is dismayed to find that the crew's morale has been destroyed by a series of punishing losses at the hands of the Dominion's ruthless soldiers, the Jem'Hadar.

The morale situation is only made worse by Martok's overcautious nature and unwillingness to go into battle, and because of this he misses a chance for an easy victory. Dax, acting as a Klingon would, challenges Worf about the General's behavior, which Worf will hear none of. In the mess hall, Dax is forced to stun a Klingon officer with her phaser when a pair of officers get into violent argument, almost causing the death of one of them. After this, Dax angrily confronts Worf about it and tells him that he needs to deal with the General by challenging him for command.

The B'Moth, the missing Klingon vessel, is found just across the Cardassian border, but Martok, fearing that the Jem'Hadar left it behind as a trap, refuses to enter Cardassian territory to rescue it. Worf realizes Martok is paralyzed by fear. Reluctantly, he decides to challenge Martok for control of the ship. A knife fight ensues, during which Worf sees that Martok's fear is gone and allows him to win the fight. Worf sustains a nasty wound yet survives, putting Martok into a battle frenzy just as a Jem'Hadar ship approaches. The revitalized crew defeats the enemy, rescues the B'Moth, and returns to Deep Space Nine as victors for the first time. Martok is forever grateful to Worf for reminding him of his duty as a Klingon warrior, and offers him a place in the House of Martok.

== Reception ==
Zach Handlen of The A.V. Club called the episode "an exciting, well-paced underdog saga".

In 2016, The Hollywood Reporter rated "Soldiers of the Empire" the 44th best television episode of all Star Trek franchise television prior to Star Trek: Discovery. Within the series, they ranked "Soldiers of the Empire" as the tenth best episode of the show.

In 2018, Nerdist ranked this episode the eighth most essential episode of the series.
