= Roxann Dawson =

American actress (born 1958)

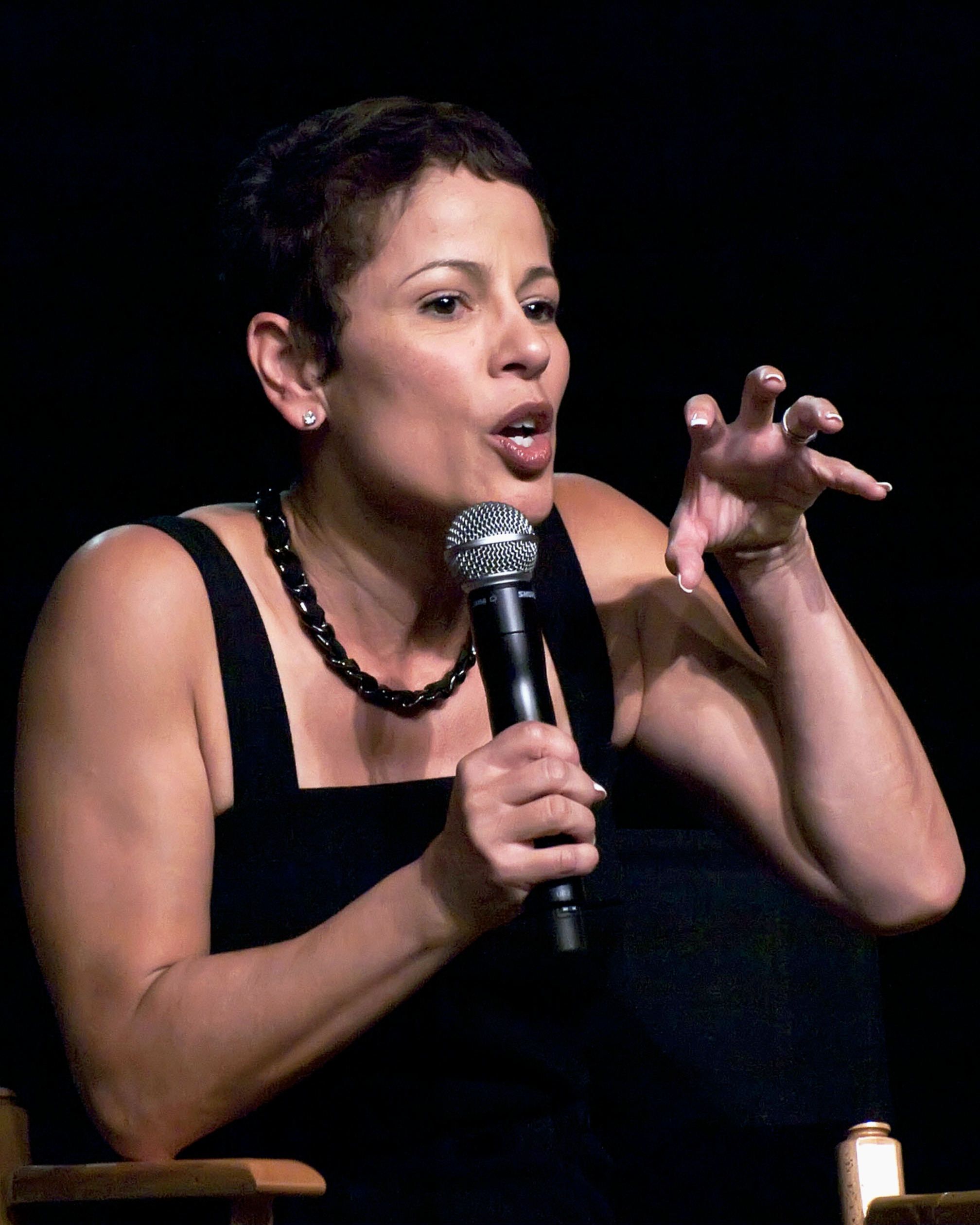
- Dawson in 2009
- Born: Roxann Caballero; September 11, 1958 (age 68); Los Angeles, California, U.S.
- Other names: Roxann Biggs; Roxann Biggs-Dawson
- Education: University of California, Berkeley (BA)
- Occupations: Actress; director; producer; writer
- Years active: 1982–present
- Spouses: Casey Biggs (m. 1985; div. 1987); Eric Dawson (m. 1994)
- Children: 2
- Website: www.roxanndawson.net

Roxann Dawson (née Caballero, born September 11, 1958), also credited as Roxann Biggs and Roxann Biggs-Dawson, is an American actress and director. She is best known for her role as B'Elanna Torres on the television series Star Trek: Voyager (1995–2001). In the 2000s, she transitioned to a career primarily as a director, and has directed numerous episodes of television series including Star Trek: Enterprise, Crossing Jordan, Cold Case, Heroes, The Closer, The Mentalist, The Good Wife, Agents of S.H.I.E.L.D., Mercy Street, The Deuce, Foundation and Dark Matter.

== Early life ==
Roxann Caballero was born September 11, 1958, in Los Angeles, California. She graduated from University of California, Berkeley in 1980.

== Career ==
=== Acting ===
Dawson's first professional acting job was in a Broadway production of A Chorus Line. She also appeared as a background dancer in the 1985 film adaptation.

In 1989 Dawson worked on the NBC drama Nightingales. During the course of her work on that show, she met casting director Eric Dawson, who would later become her second husband. After the show's cancellation, Eric's company cast her in guest roles on Matlock and Jake and the Fatman.

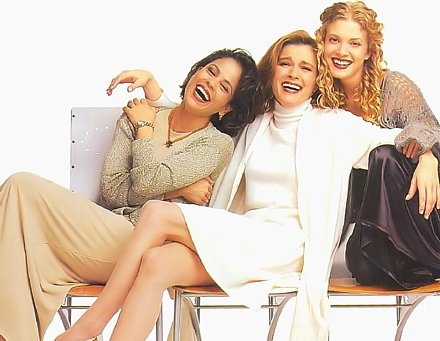
Roxann Dawson with Voyager actresses Kate Mulgrew and Jennifer Lien (1995)

In 1994, Dawson was cast as the half Human/half-Klingon engineer B'Elanna Torres on Star Trek: Voyager. She was a main cast member for all seven seasons of the show.

Her other television credits include appearances on The Hat Squad, Baywatch, The Closer, Matlock, The Untouchables, Any Day Now, Without a Trace, The Lyon's Den, The Division, the U.S. version of Coupling and the science fiction television series Seven Days.

=== Directing and producing ===
While working on Voyager, Dawson made her directorial debut on the episode "Riddles", which aired in September 1999. She later directed the second part of the two-part episode "Workforce" and directed 10 episodes of Star Trek: Enterprise. In 2002, she provided the voice of the repair station computer in one of the Star Trek: Enterprise episodes she directed.

Dawson has also directed episodes of Charmed, The O.C., Close to Home, Lost, Heroes, Hawthorne, The Closer, Cold Case, Caprica, The Mentalist and Treme. In 2010, she directed the season two episode "Teacher and Pupils" of Lie to Me and the season two episode "On Tap" of The Good Wife. In 2013, she directed the March 22 episode "Reunions" of Touch, and the October 15 episode "Eye Spy" of Agents of S.H.I.E.L.D..

In 2014 she directed the March 5 episode "Dreamcatcher" of Revolution and the October 22 episode "Phobia" of Stalker. For the 2015 season of the Amazon Video series Bosch, she directed "Chapter Six: Donkey's Years"). She directed early episodes of Mercy Street, a series released on PBS in January 2016. In 2016, she also directed the season one episodes "Broussard" and "Zero Day" of the TV series Colony. She's also directed the episode "Crossbreed" of season five of The Americans. She also directed episode 8 ("Chapter 60") of the fifth season of House of Cards. In 2021, Dawson was the director of episodes 8 and 9 of season 1 and in 2023 she directed episodes 8, 9 and 10 of season 2 of Foundation.

Dawson was a producer on Scandal, Crossing Jordan and Cold Case.

=== Writing ===
Dawson's first play, Desire to Fall, was produced by the Circle Repertory Company workshop in 1986. Her second play, Passage Through the Heart, debuted in 1997 at the University of Minnesota Duluth. From 2000 to she co-wrote with Daniel Graham a trilogy of science fiction novels, Entering Tenebrea (ISBN 0-671-03607-6), Tenebrea's Hope (ISBN 0-671-03609-2) and Tenebrea Rising (ISBN 0-671-03611-4).

== Personal life ==
Dawson was married to actor Casey Biggs; they later divorced. He later became a recurring cast member of the sister series Star Trek: Deep Space Nine as the Cardassian Damar.

In May 1994, Dawson married casting director Eric Dawson, whom she met while working on the series Nightingales. They have two daughters, one adopted from China. Dawson joined the Catholic Church at the time of her second marriage in 1994, even though she had been raised in "an atheist household". It eventually inspired her to direct the 2019 Christian film Breakthrough.

== Filmography ==
=== Acting credits ===
==== Film ====
Year	Title	Role	Notes
1985	A Chorus Line	Dancer	Credited as Roxann Caballero
1991	Guilty by Suspicion	Felicia Barron	Credited as Roxann Biggs
1992	Mortal Sins	María Croce	Credited as Roxann Biggs
1993	Blood In, Blood Out		Uncredited; Original title: Bound by Honor
1994	Pointman	Rosie Alvarez	Credited as Roxann Biggs
1994	Greyhounds	JoJo Golina	Credited as Roxann Biggs
1996	Darkman III: Die Darkman Die	Angela Rooker	Credited as Roxann Biggs-Dawson
1998	The Lost World	Elizabeth Summerlee	

==== Television series ====
Year	Title	Role	Notes
1985	Another World	Adrienne Morrow (as Roxann Biggs)	Episode 5252; credited as Roxann Biggs
1987	Ohara	Carmella	Episode: "Jesse"; credited as Roxann Biggs
1988	The Fortunate Pilgrim	Louisa	3 episodes; credited as Roxann Biggs
1989	Nightingales	Yolanda 'Yolo' Elena Puente (as Roxann Biggs)	13 episodes; credited as Roxan Biggs
1990	Baywatch	Ines	Episode: "We Need a Vacation"; credited as Roxann Biggs
1990	Matlock	Vicki Mariani	Episodes: "The Informer: Parts 1 & 2"; credited as Roxann Biggs
1991	Equal Justice	Maria	Episode: "Who Speaks for the Children?"; credited as Roxann Biggs
1991	Jake and the Fatman	Alyssa	Episode: "I Cover the Waterfront"; credited as Roxann Biggs
1992	Jake and the Fatman	Debbie Morton	Episodes: "Stormy Weather: Parts 1 & 2"; credited as Roxann Biggs
1992	The Round Table	Jennifer Clemente	7 episodes; credited as Roxann Biggs
1993	The Hat Squad	Rosie	Episode: "The Liquidator?"; credited as Roxann Biggs
1994	The Untouchables	Gina Perino	Episode: "The Fever"; credited as Roxann Biggs
1995–2001	Star Trek: Voyager	B'Elanna Torres	Main role; 172 episodes
1997	Foto Novelas: Seeing Through Walls	Teresa Puente	TV short
1999	Any Day Now	Tina	Episode: "Don't Say Anything"
2000	Seven Days	Commander Helen Keagle	Episode: "The Devil and the Deep Blue Sea"
2001	2001 Alma Awards	Herself	Awards show (presenter)
2001	Weakest Link	Herself	Episode: "Star Trek Edition"
2002	Star Trek: Enterprise	Repair Station Computer voice	Episode: "Dead Stop"; Uncredited
2003	Coupling	Therapist	Episode: Pilot
2003	The Division	Unknown	Episode: "Body Double"
2003	The Lyon's Den	Asst. District Attorney Linda Solis	3 episodes
2004	Without a Trace	Erica Palmer	Episode: "Bait"
2011	The Closer	Detective Ortega	Episode: "A Family Affair"

==== Video games ====
Year	Title	Role	Notes
2000	Star Trek: Voyager – Elite Force	Lt. B'Elanna Torres	
2016	Star Trek Timelines	Lt. B'Elanna Torres	Uncredited

==== Documentaries ====
Year	Title	Notes
1995	Inside the New Adventure: Star Trek - Voyager	
1996	It's Hot in Here: UPN Fall Preview	
1997	Trekkies	
2013	The Captains Close Up	Four-part documentary mini-series (Episode 4: "Kate Mulgrew")
2016	50 Years of Star Trek	

==== Audiobooks ====
Year	Title
1996	Star Trek: The Klingon Way, A Warrior's Guide
1997	Alien Voices: The Time Machine
1999	Alien Voices: The Lost World
2011	Alien Voices: Journey to the Center of the Earth

==== Theatre ====
Year	Title	Role	Director	Notes
Unknown	Accelerando	Unknown	Unknown	
1982	A Chorus Line	Diana Morales (as Roxann Caballero)	Michael Bennett	Shubert Theatre, New York City
1984	Daughters	Cetta (as Roxann Caballero)	Unknown	Philadelphia Drama Guild, Philadelphia
1985	Tropicana	Ana Sanchez (as Roxann Caballero)	Unknown	Musical Theater Works, New York City
1985	The Tempest	Miranda (as Roxann Caballero)	Julie Taymor	City Stage Company, New York City
1986	The Early Girl	George (as Roxann Caballero)	Munson Hicks	Circle Repertory Company, New York City
1987	The Hostage	Teresa (as Roxann Caballero)	Unknown	Coconut Grove Playhouse, Coconut Grove, Florida
1987	The Rose Tattoo	Rosa Delle Rose (as Roxann Biggs).	Unknown	Geva Theatre Center, Rochester, New York
1988	V & V Only	Janey (as Roxann Biggs)	Marshall Mason	Circle Repertory Theatre, New York City

=== Directing credits ===
==== Film ====
Year	Title	Notes
2019	Breakthrough	

==== Television ====
Year	Title	Notes
1999–2001	Star Trek: Voyager	2 episodes
2001	The Heartbreak Cafe	Episode: "Places, the Curtain Is About to Fall"
2001–2004	Star Trek: Enterprise	10 episodes
2002	Any Day Now	Episode: "Let the Games Begin"
2003	Charmed	Episode: "Lucky Charmed"
2003–2004	The Division	2 episodes
2004–2007	Crossing Jordan	12 episodes
2005	Medical Investigation	Episode: "Half Life"
2005–2009	Cold Case	8 episodes
2006	Lost	Episode: "The Long Con"
2006	The O.C.	Episode: "The Journey"
2006	Close to Home	Episode: "Privilege"
2007–2010	Heroes	3 episodes
2008–2011	The Closer	4 episodes
2009	Hawthorne	Episode: "Night Moves"
2009	Melrose Place	Episode: "Shoreline"
2010	Caprica	Episode: "End of Line"
2010	Lie to Me	Episode: "Teacher and Pupils"
2010	Rizzoli & Isles	Episode: "Sympathy for the Devil"
2010–2012	The Mentalist	3 episodes
2010–2012	The Good Wife	3 episodes
2011	The Cape	Episode: "The Lich: Part 2"
2011–2012	Treme	2 episodes
2012	Prime Suspect	Episode: "Ain't No Sunshine"
2012	Scandal	2 episodes
2012–2013	Vegas	2 episodes
2012–2013	Smash	2 episodes
2013	Touch	Episode: "Reunions"
2013	Under the Dome	Episode: "The Fourth Hand"
2013–2014	Major Crimes	2 episodes
2013–2015	Agents of S.H.I.E.L.D.	3 episodes
2014	Rake	Episode: "Remembrance of Taxis Past"
2014	Stalker	Episode: "Phobia"
2014	Believe	Episode: "Sinking"
2014	Matador	Episode: "Night of the Whale"
2014	Revolution	Episode: "Dreamcatcher"
2014	Hell on Wheels	Episode: "Thirteen Steps"
2014–2015	Bates Motel	2 episodes
2015	Bosch	Episode: "Chapter Six: Donkey's Years"
2015	Aquarius	Episode: "Your Mother Should Know"
2016	Shooter	Episode: "Musa Qala"
2016	Rosewood	Episode: "Silkworms y Silencio"
2016	Good Girls Revolt	Episode: "Exposé"
2016	Colony	2 episodes
2016	The Path	2 episodes
2016	Mercy Street	3 episodes
2016–2017	Chance	2 episodes
2017	Runaways	Episode: "Rewind"
2017	House of Cards	2 episodes
2017–2018	The Americans	2 episodes
2017–2019	The Deuce	3 episodes
2018	The Chi	Episode: "Penetrate a Fraud"
2019–2020	This Is Us	2 episodes
2019	The Morning Show	Episode: "Open Waters"
2020	Penny Dreadful: City of Angels	2 episodes
2021–present	Foundation	8 episodes
2024–present	Dark Matter	2 episodes
2026	Line of Fire	Episode: "Cul-de-Sac"

=== Writing credits ===
Year	Title	Notes
1986	Desire to Fall	Stage play
1997	A Passage Through The Heart	Stage play
2000	Entering Tenebrea	Vol. 1 of Tenebrea Trilogy (with Daniel Graham)
2001	Tenebrea's Hope	Vol. 2 of Tenebrea Trilogy (with Daniel Graham)
2001	Tenebrea Rising	Vol. 3 of Tenebrea Trilogy (with Daniel Graham)

== Awards and nominations ==
Year	Association	Category	Nominated work	Result
1996	NCLR Bravo Award	Outstanding Actress in a Drama Series	Star Trek Voyager	Nominated
1998	Online Film & Television Association Award	Best Supporting Actress in a Drama Series	Star Trek Voyager	Nominated
1998	ALMA Award	Outstanding Actress in a Drama Series	Star Trek Voyager	Nominated
1998	ALMA Award	Outstanding Latino Cast in a Made-for-Television Movie or Mini-Series	Foto Novelas: Seeing Through Walls	Won
1998	ALMA Award	Outstanding Latino Cast in a Made-for-Television Movie or Mini-Series	Foto Novelas: In the Mirror	Won
1999	ALMA Award	Outstanding Actress in a Drama Series	Star Trek Voyager	Nominated
2000	ALMA Award	Distinguished Performance	Star Trek Voyager	Nominated
2001	ALMA Award	Outstanding Achievement in a Television Series Award	Star Trek Voyager	Won
2008	ALMA Award	Outstanding Directing in a Drama Series	Heroes	Nominated
2008	Hugo Award	Best Dramatic Presentation - Long Form	Heroes	Nominated
2008	NAACP Image Award	Outstanding Directing in a Drama Series	Heroes (S1/E15: "Run!").	Nominated

== See also ==
- List of female film and television directors
