= B'Elanna Torres =

Fictional character

- Star Trek character
- First appearance: "Caretaker" (1995)
- Last appearance: "Endgame" (2001)
- Portrayed by: Roxann Dawson

In-universe information
- Species: Half-Klingon (maternal); Half-human (paternal)
- Affiliation: United Federation of Planets; Maquis; Starfleet
- Family: John Torres (father); Miral (mother)
- Spouse: Tom Paris
- Children: Miral Paris
- Posting: Chief engineer, USS Voyager
- Position: Chief Engineer
- Rank: Field commissioned Lieutenant, briefly served as a Field commissioned Lieutenant, junior grade

B'Elanna Torres /bɪˈlɑːnə/ is a main character in Star Trek: Voyager played by Roxann Dawson. She is portrayed as a half-human half-Klingon born in 2346 on the Federation colony Kessik IV.

In the series, Torres was admitted to Starfleet academy but dropped out before graduating. She joined the Maquis in 2370 and was serving on the Val Jean when taken to the Delta Quadrant by the Caretaker alien using his station. In the first few episodes, her Maquis ship was destroyed and the surviving Maquis joined the USS Voyager on the long journey across the galaxy to Earth. She was posted to engineering and quickly promoted to chief engineer, where she played a major role in the rest of the series. She had an ongoing relationship with Tom Paris, whom she married in the final season.

Dawson was praised for her portrayal of Torres by CBR, who wrote that she made the character believable. As a part-human, part-Klingon character struggling to reconcile the two halves of her heritage, Torres was praised by multi-ethnic audiences.

== Character development ==
The Star Trek: Voyager Companion describes B'Elanna as a young half-human half-Klingon in her twenties who is a member of the Maquis Rebellion.

The producers wanted to hire an actress who could portray B'Elanna's inner struggle between her human and Klingon halves. After Roxann Dawson read for the role, she became the first of the Voyager actors to be cast. Originally, Dawson's makeup differed from the final design; she explained that she had a much more pronounced Klingon forehead and nose and had to wear a set of Klingon teeth, which made her feel uncomfortable. She asked the producers and makeup artist Michael Westmore if they could perhaps make her more attractive and tone down the Klingon makeup. Eventually they came up with a design with which Roxann was happy, something she described as her "beauty monster makeup".

During season one, Dawson initially doubted her readiness to portray her character's dual roles in the early-series episode 'Faces.' However, she used the episode to learn more about her character, and it became one of her favorite episodes. When the episode aired, she called her parents to ask their opinions, and they replied, "You were good, but the girl that played that Klingon was really great!", which Dawson took as a compliment. Joy Kilpatrick was a stand-in of one of two versions albeit uncredited.

During season four, Dawson became pregnant with her first child. The writers decided they did not want B'Elanna to be pregnant as well, so for the duration of Dawson's pregnancy, she was given an engineering lab coat, which was used to help cover her growing pregnancy.

During the episode "The Killing Game", the Hirogen had taken over Voyager and forced the crew to participate in holodeck recreations of various combat situations, to which B'Elanna's holodeck character is portrayed as pregnant in World War II with a Nazi officer's child.

During season five, Dawson had a meeting with the producers and writers to discuss her character. Roxann explained to them that she felt B'Elanna had an extreme dark side that hadn't been explored, and from that discussion the episode "Extreme Risk" was created. Dawson stated that after the episode aired, she received fan mail praising the issues of depression and inner conflict raised in the episode, with which many people identified.

During season six, Dawson got the chance to explore B'Elanna's Klingon heritage thanks to an episode originally conceived by Ronald D. Moore for Star Trek: Deep Space Nine. In the episode "Barge of the Dead", B'Elanna has a near-death experience and travels to Gre'thor, the Klingon Hell, where she meets her mother, Miral. She discovers that because of the dishonor B'Elanna has caused her family, her mother would spend eternity in Gre'thor. The episode explores some aspects of B'Elanna's character, and also gives further insight into Klingon mythology. Dawson believed the episode had many layers to it, and she believed it was essentially a coming-of-age story for B'Elanna and her final acceptance of her Klingon heritage.

During season seven, a pregnancy storyline was written in for B'Elanna's character. Jessica Gaona played the character's young iteration in the episode "Lineage". At the end of the series, Dawson described B'Elanna's character arc as that of an "unruly young woman who matures over the course of seven years."

== Character overview ==
B'Elanna was born in 2346 on the Federation colony Kessik IV. Torres had a troubled childhood; her human father, John Torres, and Klingon mother, Miral, often fought. At the age of 5, she overheard her father expressing his unhappiness in the home of two Klingons and she would attempt to run away. In a later confrontation with him, she bitterly told him to leave. John Torres left when B’Elanna was twelve years old. He returned to Earth days later, leaving her to be raised by her mother. In season 7, he contacted her through Starfleet Command and asked to resume a relationship to which she agreed.

Being both Human and Klingon, Torres is shown as prone to aggressive outbursts. She once attacked her schoolmate Daniel Byrd after he repeatedly taunted her, calling her "Miss Turtlehead" due to her cranial ridges. Torres retained this aggressive behavior throughout her life, but she eventually learned to control it.

=== Starfleet Academy and Maquis ===
While attending Starfleet Academy, B'Elanna was constantly having trouble with the Starfleet's rules. This resulted in her getting four disciplinary hearings and one suspension. Torres dropped out of Starfleet Academy in 2365 at age 19. Before doing so, Torres was a valued member of the academy athletics team, competing as a decathlete. Her decision to leave the academy upset the track and field coach, as well as other professors.

A few years later she became a member of the Maquis renegade group and began developing a profound hatred of the Cardassians. Torres became associated with a Maquis captain named Chakotay and was serving as chief engineer on his ship, the Val Jean, when they were brought to the Delta Quadrant by "The Caretaker".

During her time with the Maquis, Torres reprogrammed a Cardassian missile known as "Dreadnought". The missile, built with artificial intelligence, was originally targeted at Maquis installations. Torres reprogrammed it on a course for a Cardassian installation, but "Dreadnought" was swept into the Delta Quadrant by the Caretaker.

=== USS Voyager ===
When the crews of the USS Voyager and the Val Jean were taken to the Delta Quadrant, Harry Kim and Torres were transported to the Ocampa home world while their respective crews set out to look for them. Being the only two people from their region of the Alpha Quadrant, the two quickly formed a relationship and she nicknamed him "Starfleet" for his faith in the Federation and Starfleet. This relationship would carry on throughout the series as the two would more than occasionally work on tasks together, allowing Kim to prove his intelligence to the whole crew.

In 2371, B'Elanna Torres joined the Voyager crew with the rest of the Maquis from the Val Jean, as Captain Kathryn Janeway offers them the opportunity. She was placed in the engineering department. As the original chief engineer was killed during the trip to the Delta Quadrant, Captain Janeway promoted Torres to the position based on Chakotay's recommendation. Initially, Torres was very outspoken in her disapproval of Captain Janeway's decision to destroy the Caretaker's array, which had the ability to send the Voyager back home from the Delta Quadrant, and carried a small grudge against the captain. Over the first few months, Torres began respecting the captain and her decisions based on Janeway's strong leadership and their shared interest in science.

Shortly after becoming chief engineer, Torres disobeys the captain's orders when Voyager encounters a race known as the Sikarians. The Sikarians have advanced transporter technology that could drastically shorten their 70-year journey, but Sikarian law prohibits the Voyager crew from obtaining it legitimately. Torres becomes involved with a small group of officers who obtain the technology on the Sikarian black market and perpetrate a failed attempt to integrate it into Voyager's systems.

Torres, along with Tom Paris, was later kidnapped by the Vidiians. A Vidiian scientist extracts the Klingon DNA from Torres, splicing her into two separate people: one human, one Klingon. He believed the Klingon DNA had a specific biochemical property that could lead to a cure for the Phage, a disease affecting his people. The human Torres is portrayed fraught with fear but having strong technical expertise, while the Klingon Torres is shown as aggressive and impatient. After her escape from the Vidiians the Klingon Torres suffered a fatal wound from the Vidiian energy weapon and died, but the Doctor used her DNA to restore the human Torres to her original half-human/half-Klingon state, as her cellular structure needs the Klingon DNA to survive.

In the episode "Persistence of Vision," it is revealed that Torres at the time had a romantic interest in Chakotay.

In 2373, Torres was the target of telepathically inspired dreams from a member of a race called the Enarans. The dreams were actually memories of a great massacre that took place on the Enaran homeworld and were the elder Enaran's method of making sure that the memory of this massacre lives on, even if in the mind of an alien.

Later that year, Vulcan engineer Vorik triggered Torres's mating instincts when he forcibly initiated a telepathic bond with her while he is experiencing the pon farr. Torres and Tom Paris later became trapped on a planet together during an away mission, and Torres attempted to get Paris to mate with her, but he resisted. Eventually, Vorik and Torres engaged in ritual battle to purge the blood fever.

Torres later began a relationship with Paris after a complicated and stormy courtship. During an incident in 2374, Torres confessed her love to him when they were left floating in space in environmental suits, with almost no hope of rescue ("Day of Honor"). Although Voyager was soon able to rescue them, Torres realized that her courage in admitting her love had brought her one step closer to discovering what she considered true honor. Their relationship first flourished on screen during "Scientific Method". They married in 2377 and their honeymoon was aboard the Delta Flyer.

When Torres and Paris conceived their daughter, Miral, in 2377, she learned from the Doctor that the child would have distinct Klingon cranial ridges as well as other Klingon traits. Torres, remembering painful events from her own childhood, urged the Doctor to perform gene therapy to reduce this phenotype, and even went so far as to reprogram him to do so. Paris and Captain Janeway both disagreed and prevented the Doctor from performing the genetic modifications. When Paris got her to open up, she admitted that she was afraid her husband would find living with two Klingons too difficult and leave her the way her father did. Once he allayed her fears, he admitted wanting even more children just like their mother, and Torres was finally able to enjoy the pregnancy ("Lineage").

When a group of Klingon radicals spent time aboard Voyager ("Prophecy"), Torres began opening herself to more Klingon beliefs and, for the first time since childhood, was able to pray for her grandmother, L'Naal, and her great-grandmother, Krelik. When communications with Earth became available ("Author, Author"), she reached out to her estranged father, John Torres.

Miral Paris, named after B'Elanna's mother, was born at the beginning of 2378, during Voyager's trip through a Borg transwarp conduit back to the Alpha Quadrant. In an alternate timeline where Voyager made it home by different means, Miral was shown as an adult serving in Starfleet, with the rank of ensign.

== Birthdate ==
On September 2, 2014, the official Star Trek website published an archive article with information on the press release for the launch of the series. In the document, which includes character biographies, it confirms that when the series began (2371) – "B'Elanna is a beautiful 25-year-old woman who is half-human, half-Klingon..." This information would then place B'Elanna's birthdate at 2346.

The Official Star Trek Voyager Companion gives further evidence to Torres's age. This is a passage taken from the book: "B'ELANNA TORRES is a half-Klingon, half-human in her twenties who is frantically working at the consoles of the barely spaceworthy craft..."

== Reception ==
In March 2019, Syfy rated B'Elanna as the 6th-greatest Klingon of the Star Trek franchise. In particular, they noted that she was an interesting character in the series, displaying both loyalty to the crew of the starship and brilliance as an engineer.

In 2017, Screen Rant ranked B'Elanna Torres as the 14th-most attractive person in the Star Trek universe.

In 2018, The Wrap ranked B'Elanna Torres as the 35th-best character of Star Trek overall. CBR ranked B'Elanna as the 14th-best Starfleet character of Star Trek, in 2018. They note that the former Maquis member works as chief engineer on the USS Voyager spacecraft, and must struggle with her ambivalent emotions about her Klingon heritage while keeping the warp engines working in the Delta quadrant (cutoff from Federation starbases). In addition, CBR opined that the character enhanced other characters aboard the starship, and praised the actress who portrayed her for making B’Elanna Torres's relationships more believable.

In 2019, B'Elanna Torres was ranked the 11th-sexiest Star Trek character by Syfy.

B’Elanna's struggle to reconcile both sides of her Klingon/Human hybrid heritage has been praised by audiences of multi-ethnic backgrounds.

In 2020 ScreenRant ranked B'Elanna and Tom Paris as the 3rd best romantic couple of all Star Trek.
