= Harvey Frand =

American television producer

- Born: October 3, 1940; Philadelphia, Pennsylvania, U.S.
- Died: July 23, 2009 (aged 68); Los Angeles, California, U.S.
- Occupation: Television producer
- Years active: 1979–2009
- Partner: Bill Bowersock (1977–2009)

Harvey Frand (October 3, 1940 – July 23, 2009) was an American television producer who worked across four decades in network and cable television. He is best known for his work on the reimagined Battlestar Galactica, on which he served as producer and later supervising producer from the 2003 miniseries through the 2009 television film The Plan. That body of work brought him a shared Primetime Emmy Award in 2008, a Peabody Award in 2005, and American Film Institute recognition.

Before Battlestar Galactica, Frand spent more than two decades in series television and movies of the week, with credits including the CBS fantasy drama Beauty and the Beast, the ABC Western The Young Riders, the TNT period series The Lazarus Man, and the NBC drama The Pretender. He also co-produced the 1974–75 Broadway revival of Sweet Bird of Youth.

== Early life and education ==
Frand was born on October 3, 1940, in Philadelphia, Pennsylvania. He studied political science at the University of Pittsburgh, where he earned a master's degree. While there, he worked on the Students for Kennedy campaign.

== Career ==
After graduating, Frand began his television career at NBC News. He later became an executive at Warner Bros. Television, overseeing production on Harry O, the detective drama starring David Janssen that ran from 1973 to 1976. When sent to San Diego to check on the production, he found himself filling in as an on-site producer in the absence of one already in place, an experience he credited as decisive in his turn toward hands-on producing. Concurrently with his early television work, Frand co-produced the 1974–75 Broadway revival of Tennessee Williams' Sweet Bird of Youth, starring Christopher Walken and Irene Worth, with Worth winning the Tony Award for Best Actress in a Play for her performance.

His first onscreen producer credit came in 1979 on California Fever, a CBS teen drama produced by Warner Bros. Television. He followed this with The Devlin Connection (1982), an NBC detective series starring Rock Hudson. He then produced 34 episodes of the 1985–89 CBS/syndication revival of The Twilight Zone and went on to produce the CBS fantasy drama Beauty and the Beast — for which he received a Primetime Emmy Award nomination — and the ABC period Western The Young Riders.

In 1991 he produced the television film Into the Badlands for TNT and in 1994 the science fiction film New Eden. He then joined the TNT Western series The Lazarus Man (1996) as a producer. The show, starring Robert Urich as an amnesiac who awakens in post-Civil War Texas, was produced by Ogiens/Kane Co. with Castle Rock Entertainment and Turner Program Services, and shot on location at Bonanza Creek Ranch south of Santa Fe, New Mexico. Frand told a reporter at the time: "We're trying to depict historic events as accurately as possible." He subsequently produced the NBC drama The Pretender (1996–97), the ABC science fiction series Strange World (1999), and the Disney Channel television film Up, Up, and Away! (2000). Over the course of his career he produced more than 20 television pilots and movies of the week.

=== Battlestar Galactica ===
Frand joined the reimagined Battlestar Galactica in 2003 as a producer on the miniseries, working alongside executive producers Ronald D. Moore and David Eick. He continued through the series as a supervising producer beginning with the third season, before also working on the webisode series Razor Flashbacks (2007), The Face of the Enemy (2008–09), and the television film The Plan (2009).

During his time on the production, Frand also produced the Sci Fi Channel television film Painkiller Jane (2005) and the 2007 NBC reimagining of Bionic Woman with David Eick.

Writer-producer Bradley Thompson, who collaborated with Frand across all four seasons of the series, described his working method:

In addition to finding a way to put every dime on the screen, he was an exceptional judge of material. He knew what we needed to tell our stories and never compromised on that. But he would constantly challenge us to find creative ways to make the piece work within the constraints of physical and financial reality. And if he felt we needed that something extra… say a nuclear explosion or two… to make the story play, he'd go to the mat to make it happen.

— Bradley Thompson, Variety, August 20, 2009

Mary McDonnell, star of the series, said of Frand: "Harvey had a remarkable gift as a producer. He always made the person who was voicing needs and concerns know that he was truly listening despite the fact that you knew he was juggling hundreds of others simultaneously." NBC Universal executive Todd Sharp described him as "the Wizard of Oz, the man behind the curtain, the train engineer, the orchestra conductor, the school guidance counselor," adding that he "was adored by executive producers and production assistants, studio and network, cast and crew."

Frand shared the 2005 Peabody Award for Battlestar Galactica and received recognition from the American Film Institute for the series. In 2008, he shared the Primetime Emmy Award for Outstanding Short Format Live Action Entertainment Program with Moore and Eick for Razor Flashbacks. A second Emmy nomination in the same category followed for The Face of the Enemy.

Frand died on July 23, 2009, following a brief hospitalization for respiratory problems in Los Angeles, several months before The Plan aired on Syfy on October 27, 2009.

== Personal life ==
Frand's domestic partner of 32 years was Bill Bowersock, with whom he had lived since 1977. Because their partnership was not legally recognized as a marriage under federal or state law, Bowersock was ineligible for Social Security survivor benefits following Frand's death and was ultimately required to leave the home they had shared. A documentary short, Thank You for Your Call, subsequently used Bowersock's experience to raise awareness of the legal disparities facing same-sex couples at the time.

Donations in Frand's memory were directed to the Gay Men's Chorus of Los Angeles' Alive Music Project.

== Selected television credits ==
Selected television work
Year	Title	Network	Role	Notes
1979	California Fever	CBS	Producer	
1982	The Devlin Connection	NBC	Producer	
1985–89	The Twilight Zone	CBS / Syndication	Producer	34 episodes
1987–90	Beauty and the Beast	CBS	Producer	Emmy nominated
1989–92	The Young Riders	ABC	Producer	
1991	Into the Badlands	TNT	Producer	Television film
1994	New Eden		Producer	Television film
1996	The Lazarus Man	TNT	Producer	
1996–97	The Pretender	NBC	Producer	
1999	Strange World	ABC	Producer	
2000	Up, Up, and Away!	Disney Channel	Producer	Television film
2003	Battlestar Galactica	Sci Fi	Producer	Miniseries
2004–06	Battlestar Galactica	Sci Fi	Producer	Seasons 1–2
2005	Painkiller Jane	Sci Fi	Producer	Television film
2006–09	Battlestar Galactica	Sci Fi / Syfy	Supervising producer	Seasons 3–4
2007	Bionic Woman	NBC	Producer	
2007	Razor Flashbacks	Sci Fi Channel online	Supervising producer	Webisodes; Emmy winner
2008–09	The Face of the Enemy	Syfy.com	Producer	Webisodes; Emmy nominated
2009	Battlestar Galactica: The Plan	Syfy	Producer	Television film; released posthumously
