= Veena Sood =

Canadian actress

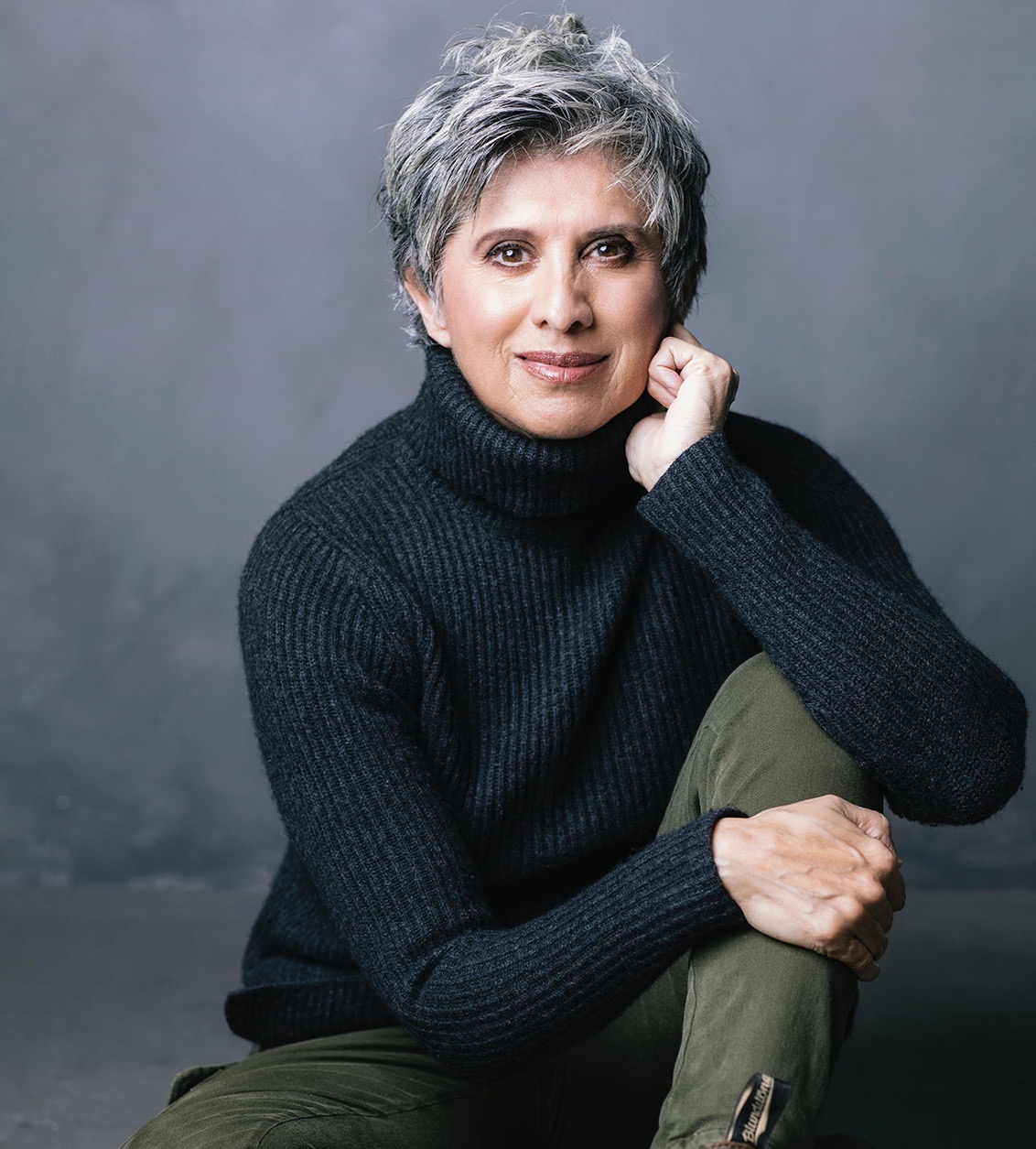
- Sood in 2025
- Born: Nairobi, Kenya
- Occupation: Actress
- Years active: 1983–present
- Spouse: J. Johnson (m. 2008)
- Relatives: Manoj Sood (brother); Ashwin Sood (cousin)
- Website: veenasood.com

Veena Sood is a Canadian actress.

== Early life and education ==
Sood was born in Kenya. Her father was a doctor and her mother, a nurse.

== Personal life ==
Her brother Manoj Sood is also an actor, while their cousin, Ashwin Sood (previously married to popular singer Sarah McLachlan), is a musician. Her nephew Kama Sood is a filmmaker based in Vancouver, BC.

She married J. Johnson on 30 August 2008.

== Career ==
After receiving her Bachelor of Fine Arts in Drama theater degree, Veena helped co-found Calgary's 'Loose Moose Theatre Company' with Improv master Keith Johnstone, and later with the Vancouver TheatreSports League.

In 1991, she won the Jessie Award for Outstanding Performance for her role in the Green Thumb Theatre play 2 B Wut U R. In 2006, she received the Leo Award for Best Guest Performance by a Female in a Dramatic Series which she won for the role 'Preety' in the Godiva's episode Flipping Switches.

She has appeared in numerous films & television series including The X-Files, Battlestar Galactica, Caprica, Stargate SG-1, Peacemaker, Smallville, Lucifer, A Million Little Things, Ghost Wars, The Indian Detective, Corner Gas Animated and several television movies. In 2003, she co-starred in the film A Touch of Pink.

She has received nomination/wins honors from the Canadian Screen Awards, Alliance of Canadian Cinema, Television and Radio Artists including the Lorena Gale Woman Of Distinction Award in November 2017 and the Sam Payne Award for contributions to humanity and artistic integrity in 2014. In 2019 she was honored by the Fund for the Arts on the North Shore (FANS) with the Distinguished Artist Award for international recognition in drama.

== Filmography ==
=== Feature films ===
Year	Film	Roles	Ref.
1983	Do Kinare		
1986	Loyalties	Sima	
1988	The Accused	Woman Orderly	
1989	Immediate Family	Admitting Nurse	
1994	Intersection	Intern	
1994	The NeverEnding Story III	Sales Lady	
1994	Timecop	Nurse	
1994	The Surgeon	Doctor in Dialysis	
1998	Wrongfully Accused	Nurse	
1999	Better Than Chocolate	Religious Zealot	
2002	Life or Something Like It	Doctor	
2003	Final Destination 2	ER Nurse	
2004	Touch of Pink	Dolly	
2004	Connie and Carla	Mrs. Morse	
2005	Two for the Money	G.A. Hostess	
2006	The Butterfly Effect 2	Nurse	
2006	Nina's Heavenly Delights	Suman Shah	
2009	Helen	Defense Attorney	
2009	Possession	Dr. Katz	
2009	Endgame	Barbara Stillwell	
2011	50/50	Nurse Stewart	
2011	The Big Year	Nurse Katie	
2014	Grace: The Possession	Doctor	
2015	Numb	Dr. Reese	
2017	Downsizing	Leisureland Housewife	
2018	The Package	Mrs. Abelar	
2018	Welcome to Marwen	Judge Martha J. Harter	
2021	Corner Office	Psychiatrist	
2022	Diary of a Wimpy Kid: Rodrick Rules	Lady in the elevator (voice)	
2023	Wedding Season	Suneeta	
2024	With Love and a Major Organ	Mona	
TBD	Statutory Violence 2	Mommy Durango	

=== Television movies ===
Year	Film	Roles	Ref.
1987	Barbie and the Rockers: Out of This World	Additional Voices	
1990	Memories of Murder	Dr. Kahn	
1992	Sexual Advances	Rosalie	
1992	Still Not Quite Human	Autograph Woman	
1993	Relentless: Mind of a Killer	New York Reporter	
1993	Other Women's Children	Mrs. Jindal	
1994	Heart of a Child	Nurse Adjani	
1994	Seasons of the Heart		
1996	Have You Seen My Son	Sally	
1996	Justice on Wheels: The Diana Kilmury Story	Office Worker	
1997	Their Second Chance	Talk Show Host	
1997	Medusa's Child	Siri Markham	
2000	Ratz	Donna Kornbalm	
2001	Love and Treason	Dr. Siddig	
2001	Class Warfare	Maria	
2001	The Heart Department	Anesthesiologist	
2002	Jinnah - On Crime: Pizza 911	Poonam	
2002	Living with the Dead	Mrs. Morse, School Teacher	
2002	Damaged Care	Maternity Nurse	
2002	Mr. St. Nick	Mrs. Sarathi	
2003	Jinnah: On Crime - White Knight, Black Widow	Poonum	
2003	A Tale of Two Wives	Mrs. Rich	
2003	D.C. Sniper: 23 Days of Fear	Sylvia Mack	
2004	Chasing Freedom	Adeena	
2005	Murder Unveiled	Magistrate	
2006	The Time Tunnel	Medical Tech	
2007	Secrets of an Undercover Wife	Bracken	
2007	Nightmare	Admitting Nurse	
2008	Barbie & the Diamond Castle	Sparkles / Lily (voice)	
2009	Compulsion	Shriya, Anjika's mother	
2009	The B Team	Janet Brown	
2012	Finding Mrs. Claus	Principal	
2014	A Fairly Odd Summer	Anti-Fairy Councilman (voice)	
2014	Honor Student	Dr. Morani	
2014	Buried Secrets	Det. Joan Mueller	
2015	A Gift of Miracles	Dr. Reed	
2015	If There Be Thorns	Dr. Phillips	
2015	Sugar Babies	Professor Paula Hickman	
2015	Just in Time for Christmas	Josie	
2018	Love at First Dance	Sophia	
2018	Reunited at Christmas	Victoria	
2018	Christmas Lost and Found	Devi	
2019	My Little Pony: Rainbow Roadtrip	Mrs. Hoofington (voice)	
2020	Sleeping with Danger	Detective Brooks	
2021	V.C. Andrews' Ruby	Dr. Cheryl	

=== Television ===
Year	Title	Roles	Episodes	Ref.
1986	The Little Vampire			
1989	Booker	Donna		
1989	21 Jump Street	Nurse; Mrs. Brown; Dr. Frick	"Loc'd Out: Part 1" "Out of Control" "Unfinished Business"	
1991-1992	The Next Line	Herself		
1992	Northwood		"Episode #2.9" "Night Moves"	
1992–1995	The Commish	Delivery Room Nurse; Lab Technician; Lab Technician	"A Time to Be Born" "Father Image: Part 1" "Father Image: Part 2"	
1994	Madison	Ms. Bowen	"Learning Curves"	
1995	University Hospital	Dr. Sherwood	"You Can Run"	
1995	The Outer Limits	Dr. Katzman	"The New Breed"	
1995	Highlander	Shandra Devane	"The Wrath of Kali" "Leader of the Pack"	
1997	Two	Jennie	"The Reckoning"	
1997	Super Dave's All Stars	Dancing Lady		
1998	The Wonderful World of Disney	Reviewer	"Principal Takes a Holiday"	
1998	Mercy Point	Sharon Tennant	"New Arrivals"	
1998	Welcome to Paradox	Faith	"Options"	
1999	Cold Feet	Saleswoman	"Pilot"	
1999–2000	Hope Island	Callie Pender	Series regular; 22 episodes	
2001	Dark Angel	Female Doctor	"...And Jesus Brought a Casserole"	
2001	Mysterious Ways	Nurse	"Episode 29"	
2000–2001	You, Me and the Kids	Mrs. Singh	"Mixed Dating" "Suicide" "Suicide Prevention"	
1999–2002	Cold Squad	Mrs. Hadawi; Anita	"First Deadly Sin" "Ambleton"	
2002	Breaking News	Claire Lippman	"Hi, Noonan"	
2003	Just Cause	Attorney Veena Tuttle	"Dream House"	
2004	The L Word	Reporter	"Locked Up"	
2004	Touching Evil	OSC Agent Sattrah	"Memorial" "K"	
2005	The Eleventh Hour	Mrs. Nair	"A Virgin Walks Into a Bar"	
2000–2005	Da Vinci's Inquest	Madam Justice Mishra; Councilor Joyce Simkins; Interim Mayor Joyce Simkins	"Bring Back the Dead" "Ride a Crippled Horse" "Must Be a Night for Fires"	
2005	Smallville	Schoolteacher	"Spirit" "Forever"	
2005	Killer Instinct	Elizabeth Michaels	"Die Like an Egyptian"	
2003–2006	Stargate SG-1	Dr. Kelly	"Full Circle" "Stronghold"	
2006	Godiva's	Preety	Supportive role; 6 episodes	
2006	Whistler	Patricia	"Fallen" "Out of the Shadows"	
2007	Falcon Beach	Mrs. Haddad	"After the Fall" "The Spins"	
2007	Masters of Science Fiction	Dr. Kashani	"The Awakening"	
2008	Kyle XY	C.I.R. Tech	"To C.I.R., with Love"	
2008	Robson Arms	Charlotte	"No Sex in the City" "Baby? What Baby?"	
2008–2009	Battlestar Galactica	Quorum Delegate	"Sine Qua Non" "A Disquiet Follows My Soul" "The Oath" "Blood on the Scales"	
2009	Caprica	Secretary of Defense Joan Leyte	"Pilot"	
2009	The Assistants	Mrs. Nidalu	"The Morning After"	
2009	Fringe	HR Head	"Earthling"	
2009	V	V Physician	"It's Only the Beginning"	
2010	Life Unexpected	Ms. Jennings	"Honeymoon Interrupted" "Homecoming Crashed"	
2010	Always a Bridesmaid	Blaga	"Knocked Up" "My Gay Husband" "So Hippie Together" "Two to Tango"	
2011	Little Mosque on the Prairie	Mrs. Rashid	"Five Year Plan" "Lord of the Ring" "Amaar's Well That Ends Well"	
2011	Endgame	Barbara Stillwell	Series regular; 13 episodes	
2011	Om Inc.	Suzanne	"Meet the Staff" "Inappropriate Touching"	
2012	Saving Hope	Deepha	"Consenting Adults"	
2012	Dr. Bob's House	Jean Patel		
2012	Emily Owens, M.D.	Mrs. Garang	"Emily and... the Predator"	
2012	Yoga Town	Neela	Series regular; 11 episodes	
2013	Baby Sellers	Noureen		
2014	Bates Motel	Dr. Elizabeth J. Schaefer	"Shadow of a Doubt"	
2014	My Little Pony: Friendship Is Magic	Ms. Harshwhinny	"Games Ponies Play" "Flight to the Finish" "Equestria Games"	
2014	Signed, Sealed, Delivered	Mrs. Hinkle	"The Future Me"	
2014	Lucky 7	Nasrin Lashari	"Cable Guy" "Gold Star, Inc."	
2015	iZombie	Marcy's Mother	"The Exterminator"	
2015	Mistresses	Phyllis	"Gone Girl" "I'll Be Watching You"	
2015	The Whispers	Margaret Cohen-Rogers	"Homesick"	
2009–2016	Supernatural	Dr. Aldrich; Principal Ramirez	"The Curious Case of Dean Winchester" "Don't You Forget About Me"	
1993–2016	The X-Files	Ms. Saunders; Dr. Louise Colquitt	"Shadows" "Home Again"	
2016	Motive	Principal Shirley Davidson	"The Dead Hand"	
2016	Chesapeake Shores	Judge Ruth Rogers	"We're Gaining a Daughter"	
2016	No Tomorrow	Amita	"No Debts Remain Unpaid"	
2016	Lucifer	Eleanor Bloom	"Homewrecker"	
2017	Frequency	Therapist	"The Edison Effect"	
2017	You Me Her	Fertility Counselor	"Weird Janis and the White Trash Baby Vessel"	
2017	Android Employed	Mrs. Cornell	"Community"	
2017–2018	Ghost Wars	Nadine Mercer	"The Curse of Copperhead Road" "Whistle Past the Graveyard" "Two Graves" "...My Soul to Keep"	
2018	Life Sentence	Alex Shugren	"The Way We Work"	
2018	Take Two	Judge Payne	"Smoking Gun"	
2018	Salvation	Dr. Kandhari	"Crimes and Punishment" "Abre Sus Ojos" "The Manchurian Candidate" "Prisoners"	
2018	16 Hudson	Shamila	"Toothbrush #3" "You Snooze You Lose" "Earth To Amala" "Pet Test'	
2019	Riverdale	Headmistress Patricia	"Chapter Forty-Seven: Bizarrodale"	
2019	The Murders	Prisha Sharma	"Queen of Hearts'	
2019	Charmed	Amita Chandra	"Past Is Present"	
2020	Nancy Drew	Dr. Sandoe; Emma Sandoe	"The Girl in the Locket" "The Clue in the Captain's Painting"	
2020	The Twilight Zone	Jill	"The Who of You"	
2020	Away	IRSO Head Meera Patel	"Negative Return" "Excellent Chariots" "Vital Signs" "Spektr" "Home"	
2020	A Million Little Things	Nurse Shayna	"Hit & Run"	
2018–2020	Corner Gas Animated	Rheena	Supportive role; 14 episodes	
2020	Loudermilk	Female Judge	"Hit Me Baby One More Time"	
2021	Home Before Dark	Dr. Singh	"Fighting His Ghost"	
2021	Molly of Denali	Dr. Amara Batra	"Going Toe to Toe with a Dinosaur"	
2022	Children Ruin Everything	Nisha	Series Regular role; 36 episodes	
2022	Deepa & Anoop	Naani-Ji (voice)	Main Character	
2025	Super Team Canada	RCM-PC, German Chancellor, Clerk, Various voices (voice)	Main Character	

=== Short films ===
Year	Film	Roles	Ref.
2002	Jane Post	Meditation Voice	
2016	A Bicycle Lesson		
2016	Meet Cute	Mona	
2017	Reel Women Seen	Nurse	
2018	The Ride Home	Carla	
2018	Little Oliver	Dr. Mehta	
2022	Send the Rain	Dawn	
TBD	Carried Away	Aliza	

=== Video games ===
Year	Film	Roles	Ref.
2015	Invisible, Inc.	Olivia Gladstone (voice)	
2017	Thimbleweed Park	Natalie (voice)	

=== Mini TV serials ===
Year	Film	Roles	Ref.
1999	Aftershock: Earthquake in New York	City Official	
2003	First to Die	Dr. Veena Yandro	
2004	Human Cargo	Sangita Desai	
2017	The Indian Detective	Malika	
2018	Darrow & Darrow	D.A. Ruth Ashland	
2020	The Stand	Dr. Biswas	"The End"
