= List of awards and nominations received by Battlestar Galactica =

Awards and nominations received by the 2004 TV series Battlestar Galactica.

== Wins ==
=== 2005 ===
- Hugo Awards, Best Dramatic Presentation, Short Form ("33")
- Spacey Awards, Favorite Limited TV Series
- Peabody Award

=== 2006 ===
- IGN Awards, Best Television Program
- IGN Awards, Best Sci-Fi Series
- IGN Awards, Best Storyline (New Caprica arc)
- IGN Awards, Editor's Choice Award (Occupation/Precipice)
- IGN Awards, Editor's Choice Award (Exodus, Part 2)
- Leo Awards, Best Lead Performance By A Female in a Dramatic Series, Tricia Helfer ("Pegasus")
- Saturn Awards, Best Syndicated/Cable Television Series
- Saturn Awards, Best Supporting Actor on Television, James Callis
- Saturn Awards, Best Supporting Actress on Television, Katee Sackhoff
- Scream Awards, Best Television Show
- Scream Awards, Most Heroic Performance, Edward James Olmos as Commander William Adama
- Spacey Awards, Best Television Show
- VES Awards, Outstanding Animated Character in a Live Action Broadcast Program, Commercial, or Music Video (Cylon Centurion in "Fragged")

=== 2007 ===
- ALMA Awards, Outstanding Actor in a TV series, mini-series, or TV movie, Edward James Olmos
- Emmy Awards, Outstanding Special Visual Effects for a Series ("Exodus, Part 2")
- RedEye, Best TV Character, Kara Thrace a.k.a. Starbuck
- Saturn Awards, Best Syndicated/Cable Television Series
- VES Awards, Outstanding Models and Miniatures in a Broadcast Program ("Resurrection Ship, Part 2")
- VES Awards, Outstanding Visual Effects in a Broadcast Series, Commercial, or Music Video ("Exodus, Part 1")

=== 2008 ===
- ALMA Awards, Outstanding Actor in a Drama Television Series, Edward James Olmos
- Emmy Awards, Outstanding Special Class - Short-format Live-action Entertainment Programs ("Razor Featurette #4")
- Emmy Awards, Outstanding Special Visual Effects for a Series ("He That Believeth in Me")
- VES Awards, Outstanding Visual Effects in a Broadcast Miniseries, Movie or Special (Razor)

=== 2009 ===
- Emmy Awards, Outstanding Sound Editing For A Series ("Daybreak: Part 2")
- Golden Reel Awards, Best Sound Editing - Short Form Sound Effects and Foley in Television ("He That Believeth in Me")
- Saturn Awards, Best Syndicated/Cable Television Series
- Saturn Awards, Best Television Actor, Edward James Olmos
- Saturn Awards, Best Television Actress, Mary McDonnell
- Television Critics Association Awards, Program of the Year
- VES Award, Outstanding Visual Effects in a Broadcast Series ("BSG space battle, season four")

== Nominations ==
=== 2005 ===
- Emmy Awards, Outstanding Special Visual Effects for a Series ("33")
- Emmy Awards, Outstanding Special Visual Effects for a Series ("The Hand of God")
- Nebula Awards, Best Script ("Act of Contrition/You Can't Go Home Again" by Carla Robinson & Bradley Thompson & David Weddle)
- VES Awards, Outstanding Performance by an Animated Character in a Live Act on Broadcast Program ("33")

=== 2006 ===
- ALMA Awards, Outstanding Actor in a Television Series, Edward James Olmos
- Emmy Awards, Outstanding Special Visual Effects for a Series ("Resurrection Ship, Part 2")
- Emmy Awards, Outstanding Costumes for a Series ("Lay Down Your Burdens, Part 2")
- Emmy Awards, Outstanding Single-Camera Sound Mixing for a Series ("Scattered")
- Hugo Awards, Best Dramatic Presentation - Short Form ("Pegasus")
- Nebula Awards, Best Script ("Unfinished Business" by Michael Taylor)
- Scream Awards, Most Heroic Performance, Edward James Olmos as Commander William Adama
- Scream Awards, Breakout Performance, Tricia Helfer as Number Six
- Scream Awards, Breakout Performance, Katee Sackhoff as Starbuck
- Saturn Awards, Best Supporting Actor on Television, Jamie Bamber
- Saturn Awards, Best Television Release on DVD (Season 1)
- Saturn Awards, Best Television Release on DVD (Season 2.0)
- VES Awards, Outstanding Animated Character in a Live Action Broadcast Program, Commercial, or Music Video (Cylon in "Valley of Darkness")

=== 2007 ===
- Emmy Awards, Outstanding Directing for a Drama Series ("Exodus, Part 2")
- Emmy Awards, Outstanding Writing for a Drama Series ("Occupation/Precipice")
- Emmy Awards, Outstanding Sound Editing for a Series ("Exodus, Part 2")
- Hugo Awards, Best Dramatic Presentation - Short Form ("Downloaded")
- Saturn Awards, Best Actor in a Television Program, Edward James Olmos
- Saturn Awards, Best Actress in a Television Program, Katee Sackhoff
- Saturn Awards, Best Supporting Actor in a Television Program, James Callis
- Scream Awards, The Ultimate Scream
- Scream Awards, Best Television Show
- Spacey Awards, Favourite Character You Love to Hate, Gaius Baltar
- VES Awards, Outstanding Animated Character in a Live Action Broadcast Program, Commercial or Music Video ("Downloaded")
- VES Awards, Outstanding Compositing in a Broadcast Program, Commercial or Music Video ("Resurrection Ship, Part 2")
- Writers Guild of America, Television Award ("Occupation/Precipice")

=== 2008 ===
- Emmy Awards, Outstanding Cinematography for a One Hour Series (Razor)
- Emmy Awards, Outstanding Sound Mixing for a Comedy or Drama Series (one-hour) (Razor)
- Emmy Awards, Outstanding Writing for a Drama Series ("Six of One")
- Emmy Awards, Outstanding Single-camera Picture Editing for a Drama Series ("He That Believeth in Me")
- Hugo Awards, Best Dramatic Presentation - Short Form (Razor)
- People's Choice Awards, Favorite Sci-Fi Show
- Saturn Awards, Best Syndicated/Cable Television Series
- Saturn Awards, Best Television Presentation (Razor)
- Saturn Awards, Best Television Actor, Edward James Olmos
- Scream Awards, Best Television Actress, Tricia Helfer
- Scream Awards, Best Television Actor, Edward James Olmos
- Scream Awards, Best Television Show
- VES Awards, Outstanding Visual Effects in a Broadcast Series ("Maelstrom")

=== 2009 ===
- Emmy Awards, Outstanding Directing for a Drama Series ("Daybreak: Part 2")
- Emmy Awards, Outstanding Single-Camera Picture Editing For A Drama Series ("Daybreak: Part 2")
- Emmy Awards, Outstanding Sound Mixing For A Comedy Or Drama Series (One Hour) ("Daybreak: Part 2")
- Emmy Awards, Outstanding Special Visual Effects For A Series ("Daybreak: Part 2")
- Emmy Awards, Outstanding Special Class - Short-format Live-Action Entertainment Programs ("Battlestar Galactica: The Face of the Enemy")
- Hugo Awards, Best Dramatic Presentation - Short Form ("Revelations")
- Saturn Awards, Best Television Supporting Actress, Katee Sackhoff
- Scream Awards, Best Ensemble
- Scream Awards, Best Science Fiction Actress, Katee Sackhoff
- VES Awards, Outstanding Visual Effects in a Broadcast Series

== Other honors ==
=== 2005 ===
- American Film Institute's Top 10 Television Shows of the Year
- American Film Institute's Moments of significance 2005: Movies and Television Picture a Post 9/11 World
- Time's Best of 2005: Television (#1)
- TV Guide's and TV Land's The 100 Most Unexpected TV Moments for "Kobol's Last Gleaming, Part 2" (#98)
- Chicago Tribune's Top 10 TV shows of 2005
- Newsday's Top 10 TV shows of 2005 (#1)
- Pittsburgh Post-Gazette's Top 10 TV shows of 2005 (#1)

=== 2006 ===
- American Film Institute's Top 10 Television Shows of the Year
- Time's Best of 2006: Television (#7)
- Chicago Tribune's Top 10 TV shows of 2006
- Entertainment Weekly's Top 10 TV Shows of 2006 (#3)
- Metacritic's Top TV shows of 2006 (#2)
- Arizona Republic's Top 10 TV shows of 2006 (#7)
- Newsday's Top 10 TV Shows of 2006 (#3)
- Pittsburgh Post-Gazette's Top 10 TV shows of 2006 (#3)
- San Jose Mercury-News's Top TV shows of 2006 (#5)
- Salon.com Buffy Award for Season 3 of Battlestar Galactica "the most underappreciated show in all of TV land"
- TV Guide's Top 10 TV Shows of 2006 (#5)

=== 2007 ===
- Entertainment Weekly, Best 25 Science Fiction of the Past 25 Years (#2)
- Time's The 100 Best TV Shows of All-TIME
- The New York Times' Top 10 TV Shows of 2007 (#8)
- Box Office Prophets's Calvin Awards, Best Television Show (#1)

=== 2008 ===
- Time's Top 10 TV Series of 2008 (#8)
- Time's Top 10 TV Episodes of 2008 (#6 - "Revelations")
- Chicago Tribune's Top 10 TV shows of 2008 (#3)
- TV Guide's Best Shows of 2008
- New Jersey Star-Ledger's Top 10 TV shows of 2008 (#7)
- Television Without Pity's Tubey Awards: Best Drama, Best Cast
- San Francisco Chronicle's Top 25 TV shows of 2008 (#4)
- Box Office Prophets's Calvin Awards, Best Television Show (#3)

=== 2009 ===
- Time "Top 10 TV Series of 2009" (#5)
- AOL's 50 Best TV Dramas Ever (#12)
- TV Guide "Top 100 [U.S.] Episodes of All-Time (2009)". (Blood on the Scales, #43)

=== 2010 ===
- Boston.com "Top 50 Science Fiction Television Shows of All Time" (#1)

=== 2011 ===
- IGN.com "Top 50 Sci-Fi Shows" (#1)

=== 2021 ===
- BBC's 100 Greatest Television Series of the 21st Century (#70)

== See also ==
- List of awards and nominations received by Battlestar Galactica (miniseries)
- List of awards and nominations received by Battlestar Galactica: Razor
