= Battlestar Galactica: The Face of the Enemy =

- The title card of the show
- Written by: Jane Espenson; Seamus Kevin Fahey
- Directed by: Wayne Rose
- Starring: Alessandro Juliani; Grace Park; Michael Hogan
- No. of episodes: 10

Production
- Producer: Paul M. Leonard
- Running time: 3–6 minutes

Original release
- Network: Sci Fi.com
- Release: December 12, 2008 – January 12, 2009

Related
- "Revelations"; "Sometimes a Great Notion"

Battlestar Galactica: The Face of the Enemy is a ten-part series of webisodes that was broadcast in the mid-season break of season 4 of Battlestar Galactica. The episodes are between 3 and 6 minutes in length, with two released per week. The series was written by Jane Espenson and Seamus Kevin Fahey.

The episodes were released in the break between "Revelations" and "Sometimes a Great Notion", but are set in between "Sometimes a Great Notion" and the following episode, "A Disquiet Follows My Soul". In March 2009 the series won several Streamy Awards: Best Dramatic Web Series, Best Writing for a Dramatic Web Series, and Best Male Actor in a Dramatic Web Series for Alessandro Juliani. The series was also nominated for an Emmy Award in the Short-format Live-action Entertainment Program category.

Due to the outcome of the 2007-08 Writers Guild of America strike (which affected creator compensation for web-based content), the webisodes were not included in any North American or European DVD (Region 1) or Blu-ray releases, but were finally released as part of the Japanese Season 4 Blu-ray collection in 2013.

== Plot ==
Nine days after discovering Earth (following "Revelations", i.e., episode 10 of the fourth season), Galactica and the fleet are back in space. Lt. Felix Gaeta is on board a Raptor with two Cylon number Eights ("Sweet Eight" and "Pilot Eight") and three other humans (Raptor crew "Easy" and "Shark", and deckhand mechanic Brooks) en route to the Zephyr when a DRADIS contact prompts the fleet to execute an emergency jump. A computer error results in the Raptor jumping to an unknown location beyond the Red Line. Stranded without a functioning FTL (Faster than Light) drive, those on board face the grim realization that they may run out of oxygen before they are rescued.

Tensions between human and Cylon passengers are aggravated when Pilot Eight attempts to aid Brooks with a mechanical repair, but is electrocuted. When the pliers she was using are found to have been stripped of insulation, those remaining begin to suspect foul play. Brooks is the next victim, this time the cause of death being a fatal dose of morpha.

Meanwhile, Lt. Hoshi acquires permission to participate in a SAR (Search and Rescue) mission for the missing Raptor. Accompanied by pilot Racetrack, they discuss Hoshi and Gaeta's romantic relationship, their perception of Gaeta's moral character, and fading hope of finding survivors.

Flashbacks show that months ago during the Cylon occupation on New Caprica, Gaeta was involved romantically with Sweet Eight. He provided her with names of missing or detained resistance members under the impression that she would attempt to free them, when in actuality they were being executed.

Sweet Eight tells Gaeta if she connects with the Raptor, she can determine where the error was made. Gaeta helps her until he discovers Shark and Easy are dead, their throats slashed with the scalpel he provided to Sweet Eight in the process of connecting with the Raptor, earlier. She rationalizes her actions by explaining people kill when necessary: the limited supply of oxygen prompted her to murder the other Raptor passengers, while she viewed resistance members on New Caprica as enemy combatants.

Sweet Eight accuses Gaeta of having been aware, on some level, of her true intentions on New Caprica, but that he chose self-delusion. She suggests that perhaps human and Cylon are not so different after all. Just as Gaeta stabbed Gaius Baltar with a pen in the episode "Taking a Break from All Your Worries" after he threatened to reveal Gaeta as a double agent ("I know what your Eight did"), Gaeta, livid, stabs Sweet Eight with the scalpel, leaving him the sole survivor aboard the Raptor.

Gaeta is wavering in an attempted overdose of morpha when Hoshi and Racetrack finally find him. Back aboard Galactica, Gaeta expresses intense displeasure with the Cylon alliance. He demands to speak to the Admiral directly, pointing out that Tigh is a Cylon. A cryptic message to Lt. Hoshi, "You found me and you saved me, so I'll protect you. And if this doesn't work out, if I'm wrong, then you have a bright future, Louis. But keep your head down," foreshadowing Gaeta's actions in subsequent episodes.

== Webisodes ==
| Title | Release date |
|---|---|
| Webisode 1 | December 12, 2008 |
| Webisode 2 | December 15, 2008 |
| Webisode 3 | December 17, 2008 |
| Webisode 4 | December 22, 2008 |
| Webisode 5 | December 24, 2008 |
| Webisode 6 | December 29, 2008 |
| Webisode 7 | December 31, 2008 |
| Webisode 8 | January 5, 2009 |
| Webisode 9 | January 7, 2009 |
| Webisode 10 | January 12, 2009 |

== Cast ==
- Alessandro Juliani as Lieutenant Felix Gaeta
- Grace Park as the two Number Eights
- Michael Hogan as Colonel Saul Tigh
- Brad Dryborough as Lieutenant Louis Hoshi
- Leah Cairns as Lieutenant Margaret "Racetrack" Edmondson
- Michael Rogers as Brooks
- Jessica Harmon as "Easy" Esrin
- William C. Vaughn as Lieutenant J. "Shark" Finnegan (credited as "Finn")
- James Callis as Gaius Baltar (flashback footage)

== Availability ==
The series is not included on the Region 1 box set for "Battlestar Galactica: Season 4.5" (episodes 12–22) or the "Battlestar Galactica: The Complete Series" box sets. Although listed on the distributor's website for the Region 2 DVD box set of "Battlestar Galactica: The Final Season" (episodes 12–22) the series is absent from the released version. However, in 2013 the webisodes were included for the first time on the Japanese Season 4 Blu-ray box set.
