= Sometimes a Great Notion (disambiguation) =

Sometimes a Great Notion is a 1964 novel by the American author Ken Kesey.

Sometimes a Great Notion may also refer to:

- Sometimes a Great Notion (film), a 1970 film adaptation of the novel
- "Sometimes a Great Notion" (Battlestar Galactica), an episode from the fourth season of the television series Battlestar Galactica
- "Sometimes a Great Notion" (song), a song by John Mellencamp from his 1989 album Big Daddy
