= A Disquiet Follows My Soul =

- Battlestar Galactica episode
- Episode no.: Season 4 Episode 12
- Directed by: Ronald D. Moore
- Written by: Ronald D. Moore
- Original air date: January 23, 2009

Episode chronology
← Previous "Sometimes a Great Notion"	Next → "The Oath"
- Battlestar Galactica season 4

"A Disquiet Follows My Soul" is the twelfth episode in the fourth season of the reimagined Battlestar Galactica. It aired on television in the United States and Canada on January 23, 2009, in Australia on January 31, 2009, and on Sky One in the UK on January 27, 2009. According to the director, this episode takes place immediately after the webisode series "The Face of the Enemy". The survivor count shown in the title sequence is 39,644. The Region 1 DVD release of Season 4.5 includes an extended version of this episode.

== Plot ==
The episode begins by following William Adama through his morning routine. He appears very distressed and discontented and later makes his way to the CIC in a disgruntled mood.

In sickbay, Saul Tigh and Caprica-Six watch their baby on an ultrasound medical imaging device. Six mentions that previously, intra-Cylon procreation has never been successful, and that this baby is the savior of the Cylon race, since it means survival without resurrection ships. Meanwhile, Felix Gaeta waits to be treated, and complains about how the Cylons don't have to wait and are getting better treatment than he is.

On Colonial One, a presidential press conference is held to address the current situation with Earth and the fleet's upcoming plans. The press seems to be concerned about rumors of the alliance with the rebel Cylons, and multiple questions regarding this situation are being asked, as well as whether the Cylons Saul Tigh, Galen Tyrol and Samuel Anders are going to continue serving in the fleet, and whether the identity of the last Cylon is finally known, to none of which Admiral Adama, Lee Adama nor nominated vice president and current acting president Tom Zarek give a definite answer. Lee slips up and mentions that the final Cylon was female, revealing to the reporters that more is known than is being said.

After the press conference, William Adama and his son, Lee Adama argue with Tom Zarek, who opposes the planned official alliance with the Cylons, stating that in the time that he is the acting president, such an alliance will not happen.

William Adama, Saul Tigh, Lee Adama, Galen Tyrol, Felix Gaeta and Karl Agathon meet in the Admiral's office to confer about upgrading the fleet's jump drives with Cylon technology, an upgrade which would triple their range and the fleet's chances of finding a habitable planet. For the upgrades to happen, though, the fleet's citizens and ships' captains would have to be willing to let Cylons do the upgrades. In turn for upgrading the drives, the Cylons request that they be allowed to become citizens of the fleet. By becoming citizens, they hope to make Adama oath-bound to protect them from Cavil's faction of the Cylons. Felix Gaeta objects to the idea.

Galen Tyrol brings his son into sickbay where, after an examination, Dr. Cottle states that the child is suffering from renal failure. After the question of blood transfusions comes up and Tyrol remarks that the child would need his blood since it is half-Cylon, Dr. Cottle reveals to Tyrol that the child is not his, withholding the father's identity. Tyrol leaves visibly upset and disappointed.

Felix Gaeta confronts Kara Thrace in the messhall, accusing her husband Samuel Anders, now known to be a Cylon, of having helped to murder billions of people, and he accuses her of possibly being a Cylon too. Felix states that a reckoning will happen soon, referring to Captain Thrace accusing him once of being a collaborator and wanting to throw him out the airlock, and when she asks whether this is a threat, Gaeta confirms it. Kara finally retreats but reminds him she has no qualms "hitting a cripple". Once she's left, Gaeta gathers the others in to introduce them to his plans.

In a Quorum meeting, Tom Zarek is making a point about how collaborating with the Cylons, the original enemy of the 12 colonies, is a complete mistake, claiming that President Roslin and Admiral Adama are proposing this only to stay in power. Following that, he makes a proposal that Cylons should only be allowed to board ships in the fleet with the crew's permission. The Quorum votes unanimously with the exception of Lee Adama for the proposal, thus accepting it.

Laura Roslin, disillusioned, refuses to stay in office as president throughout entire episode. She throws away her cancer-fighting medication and starts jogging around the ship's corridors. There, she meets Admiral Adama, who tries to convince her that she is needed right now and must step back into office, to which she replies that she does not want to be used in any kind of plan, nor play any role anymore, as she deserves to live a little after all she has given and has happened. Adama grudgingly agrees, and Roslin tells him that he deserves to live a little as well. She kisses him and continues running.

In a lower deck, Gaius Baltar speaks before a gathering. He states that they should not have to excuse themselves before God, that instead God should come down and beg for their forgiveness, since they have not sinned, yet he led them to the desperate situation they are in now.

Galen Tyrol is present during Baltar's speech, and he sees Hot Dog, a Viper pilot, there as well. The two exchange long, intense stares, and Galen realizes that Hot Dog is the father of Specialist Cally Henderson Tyrol's child, a fact which Hot Dog admits when Tyrol approaches and confronts him. Tyrol punches him, and they engage in an intense fistfight in the middle of Baltar's speech. Tyrol later brings Hot Dog into sickbay, both of them sporting fresh bruises, telling him that it is now his turn to watch the child.

The fleet's tylium ship, the Hitei Kan, defects, making an FTL jump to coordinates unknown to the rest of the fleet with the exception of Tom Zarek, who in a power play instructed the tylium ship to do so. After the ship leaves, William Adama has Tom Zarek arrested and blackmails him into revealing the location of the ship by airing his 'dirty laundry' using alleged information of criminal acts of Zarek's during his time as politician. Zarek, fearing the scandal to his reputation, gives in and reveals the location of the ship to Adama. When Adama later hands the blackmail dossier to Tigh for him to return it to Mr. Hoshi, it becomes apparent that he was only bluffing, as the dossier was composed of mere laundry reports.

In the aftermath, Felix Gaeta meets with Tom Zarek. Tom Zarek promises that there will be consequences to what has happened, and Felix Gaeta agrees, stating that in his opinion everything is going wrong, and that there has to be someone to make it right again. He asks Zarek whether he is that man. Zarek replies that he is one of them, but that he needs a partner. Gaeta states that as of now, he has one, and shakes hands with Zarek.

Sharon Agathon and other crew jump to the tylium ship's coordinates, and manage to bring it back. Admiral Adama receives notification of the tylium ship's return, accepting the call while in his quarters, in bed with Laura Roslin. She shows some interest in the news, and he asks her if she's back to caring. She responds in the negative, then hangs up the phone, as he laughs and snuggles up to her.

== Production ==
The episode was directed by Ronald D. Moore, his directorial debut.

== Ratings ==
Total viewership for same-day viewing for "A Disquiet Follows My Soul" dropped nearly 20 percent from the previous week's episode, to just 1.7 million.

== Critical reception ==
Alan Sepinwall of The Star-Ledger felt that the "Gaeta and Zarek scenes through the episode crackled, especially Felix confronting Kara." Maureen Ryan of the Chicago Tribune also enjoyed Starbuck's showdown with Gaeta, as well as the final scene of Roslin and Adama, and seeing a drunk, angry, and bitter Baltar.
