= The Oath (Battlestar Galactica) =

- Battlestar Galactica episode
- Lee Adama is being taken hostage by mutineers
- Episode no.: Season 4 Episode 13
- Directed by: John Dahl
- Written by: Mark Verheiden
- Original air date: January 30, 2009

Guest appearances
- Richard Hatch as Tom Zarek; Sebastian Spence as Lt. Noel "Narcho" Allison

Episode chronology
← Previous "A Disquiet Follows My Soul"	Next → "Blood on the Scales"
- Battlestar Galactica season 4

"The Oath" is the thirteenth episode in the fourth season of the reimagined Battlestar Galactica. It aired on television in the United States and Canada on January 30, 2009 and in the UK on Sky One on February 3, 2009.

In the previous episode, the fleet's leadership announced its plan to upgrade the fleet's faster-than-light drives using Cylon technology to triple its reach in searching for a final home. Felix Gaeta, betrayed by Cylons on several occasions, vehemently opposes the plan. Finally, he makes a pact with Tom Zarek, as of then not fully disclosed, to, in his words, rectify things that have gone wrong. The episode has a survivor count of 39,643.

== Plot ==
Gaeta helps Zarek to jailbreak from the Galactica onto Colonial One. There, Zarek talks Lee Adama into leaving Colonial One and returning to Galactica, to request from Admiral Adama the reason for letting Zarek go. In the meantime, Gaeta organizes a full scale mutiny on-board Galactica, with the civilians arming themselves using weapons from Galactica's weapons lockers. Kara Thrace notices the uprising, and tries to get confirmation on what is happening, but is denied the information, being repelled on the grounds of her status being unknown after the events of "Sometimes a Great Notion". Officers of the fleet who have mutinied, among them prominent people like Racetrack, Narcho and Skulls, take Lee Adama hostage upon arrival on the Galactica. He is promptly rescued by Thrace. They flee together, and decide to try to remedy the situation to whatever extent is in their reach.

Rebel crew members imprison Samuel Anders, as well as Karl Agathon and his wife Sharon Agathon, and their child, Hera Agathon, together with Caprica Six in a brig cell. In the CIC, Admiral Adama and Saul Tigh are taken hostage and sent to the brig as well. Adama and Tigh manage to overwhelm their captors and break free. Lee Adama and Capt. Thrace help President Laura Roslin (who has decided to take an active role in government again) meet with Gaius Baltar in order for her to use Baltar's wireless transmitter to address the fleet and bring the people back into order; afterwards they join up by coincidence with Admiral Adama and Tigh. Together they make their way to Storage Bay Two, from where Galen Tyrol has promised to take the Admiral and the President into safety on the rebel Cylon basestar.

Zarek keeps control of the situation from Colonial One. He is displeased to learn that one of his intentions—Adama's death—has not been fulfilled.

Alone in the storage bay, Baltar and Roslin come back closer together. They finally realize that they have more in common than it seemed all along. Roslin makes it off the Galactica with Tyrol's help; Gaeta, however, orders their Raptor destroyed. Saul Tigh and Admiral Adama defend the storage bay from where the Raptor took off, only to be attacked by rebel marines. Both Tigh and Adama's fates, as well as that of the Raptor, remain uncertain at the end of the episode.

== Ratings ==
Total viewership dropped significantly again for this episode. Total viewership dropped to just 1.560 million same-day viewers, down from 1.717 million total viewers the week before and 2.1 million same-day viewers for the Season 4.5 premiere two weeks earlier.

== Critical reception ==
Alan Sepinwall of The Star-Ledger praised how the episode "showed, again and again, characters using the mutiny as an excuse to settle old scores, or, even worse, to let off all of the steam that's built up over this awful four-year journey" and appreciated that the writers acknowledged through Lee "one of the few characters who still has a relatively clean conscience" and that Gaeta and Zarek have a point about the Cylon alliance. Maureen Ryan of the Chicago Tribune felt that the episode "worked on a number of levels: There was the slow-building mystery of what the rebels were actually up to – the tension slowly ratcheted up as various facets of their plan were revealed. Despite all the slam-bang action – which was expertly directed by John Dahl – the episode threaded through a critique of Adama and Roslin's methods and actions."
