= David Eick =

American writer and producer (born 1968)

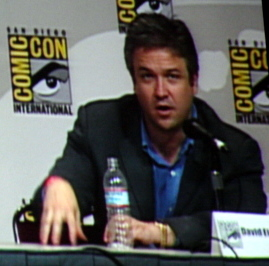
- Eick at San Diego Comic-Con in July 2007
- Born: 1968 (age 57–58); United States
- Education: University of Redlands
- Occupations: Television writer; television producer

David Eick (/ˈaɪk/) (born 1968) is an American writer and producer, best known as the executive producer of Battlestar Galactica, for which he also wrote several episodes. He executive produced Caprica and Battlestar Galactica: Blood & Chrome. He produced Hercules: The Legendary Journeys, Xena: Warrior Princess, American Gothic and Cover Me.

== Background ==
Eick graduated from the University of Redlands in Redlands, California, in 1990, with a B.A. degree in political science and a minor in business administration.

== Battlestar Galactica franchise ==
In 2003, Eick and Ronald D. Moore developed and executive produced Battlestar Galactica, a “re-imagining” of the 1978 series of the same name. Originally created as a mini-series for Sci Fi, the remake ultimately became a critically acclaimed drama which ran four seasons, earning numerous awards including 18 Emmy nominations, 4 Emmy wins, the Saturn Award for excellence in science fiction and the coveted Peabody Award recognizing "distinguished achievement and meritorious service". The show also won the American Film Institute Award in 2005 and 2006 for its "contribution to America’s cultural legacy", and was honored in 2009 by the United Nations.

In 2013, the Writers Guild of American Awards recognized Battlestar placing it on its list of The 101 Best-Written Television Series of All Time. In 2008, Eick's production company David Eick Productions signed an overall deal with NBC.
