= Blood on the Scales =

- Battlestar Galactica episode
- Felix Gaeta is appalled after realizing Tom Zarek had all members of the Quorum killed
- Episode no.: Season 4 Episode 14
- Directed by: Wayne Rose
- Written by: Michael Angeli
- Original air date: February 6, 2009

Guest appearances
- Richard Hatch as Tom Zarek; Callum Keith Rennie as Leoben; Mark Sheppard as Romo Lampkin; Rekha Sharma as Tory Foster; Sebastian Spence as Lt. Noel "Narcho" Allison

Episode chronology
← Previous "The Oath"	Next → "No Exit"
- Battlestar Galactica season 4

"Blood on the Scales" is the fourteenth episode in the fourth season of the reimagined Battlestar Galactica. It aired on television in the United States and Canada on February 6, 2009. The survivor count shown in the title sequence is 39,603.

== Plot ==
Felix Gaeta and Tom Zarek move to consolidate their insurrection in the fleet, while Cpt. Kara Thrace and Lee Adama organize resistance on board the Galactica and try to retake control of the ship. Zarek brings in Romo Lampkin to serve as Admiral Adama's defense counsel, against both Lampkin's and Adama's will. After a brief trial, Zarek, acting as judge, condemns Adama to death by firing squad. Zarek travels to Colonial One to attempt to solidify his position with the support of the Quorum of Twelve (absent Lee Adama). When they reject his coup and ask him to leave, he has two marines execute the entire group. Meanwhile, Kara and Lee rescue the high-profile prisoners taken in "The Oath" (Samuel Anders, Colonel Tigh, Sharon Agathon, as well as Helo, Hera and Caprica-Six), and with the help of Aaron Kelly rescue Admiral Adama from execution. Laura Roslin and her allies on the Cylon basestar, now under threat of attack from Gaeta and the Galactica, position the ship among the fleet to temporarily shield themselves. With Adama certain to be killed, the Cylons vote to jump away, but Roslin convinces them to stay with the fleet.

Adama and his allies, including some former mutineers, march to retake the CIC. During a skirmish, Anders is shot in the neck, and Kara convinces Romo Lampkin to help her carry him to Dr. Cottle. In the CIC, Gaeta and Zarek are in the middle of a standoff with President Roslin. Zarek, presuming that Adama has already been executed, tells Roslin that Adama is dead, and Roslin vows to take vengeance. Gaeta orders the ship to jump away, but Tyrol has sabotaged the FTL drive, and Gaeta realizes the mutiny is failing. Rather than attacking as Zarek presses him to do, Gaeta orders his men to stand down. Moments later, Adama and his men storm the CIC, and the mutineers give up without a fight. After the CIC is reclaimed, Tyrol, who is still in the engine room, notices and inspects a heavily damaged section of wall. Long linear grooves appear to have been gouged into the steel, presumed to be either battle damage or due to wear and tear over the ship's lifetime.

Later, Gaeta has a conversation with Gaius Baltar where he expands upon his former hopes and dreams and his wish for people to know who he really was and why he did what he did. Baltar and Gaeta make peace with each other over their past differences with Baltar acknowledging an understanding of who Gaeta is. As a result of their actions, Admiral Adama has Gaeta and Zarek executed by a firing squad that he commands personally. Moments before being executed, Gaeta's phantom limb pain stops, indicating that he is finally at peace with himself.

== Ratings ==
Same-day total viewership ratings for "Blood on the Scales" rose to 1.767 from 1.560 million the previous week, a rise of about 13.2 percent. This was roughly equal to total viewership for the second episode of Season 4.5 ("A Disquiet Follows My Soul") but left viewership still down nearly 20 percent from the Season 4.5 premiere episode ("Sometimes a Great Notion").

== Critical reception ==
Alan Sepinwall of The Star-Ledger felt that the episode was "brilliant", "even more moving and shocking and bad-ass than last week's The Oath" and praised the performances in particular Mary McDonnell and Alessandro Juliani who "did a masterful job of making you understand, if not agree with, Felix's point of view." Maureen Ryan of the Chicago Tribune felt that the episode was "a particularly dense episode of the show: There wasn't a wasted moment, action or word. It was absolutely jammed with incidents and developments, yet it was really also just one story: The tragedy of Felix Gaeta."
