= Sometimes a Great Notion (Battlestar Galactica) =

- Battlestar Galactica episode
- Episode no.: Season 4 Episode 11
- Directed by: Michael Nankin
- Written by: Bradley Thompson; David Weddle
- Original air date: January 16, 2009

Guest appearances
- Lucy Lawless as Number Three; Callum Keith Rennie as Leoben; Rekha Sharma as Tory Foster; Kate Vernon as Ellen Tigh

Episode chronology
← Previous "Revelations"	Next → "A Disquiet Follows My Soul"
- Battlestar Galactica season 4

"Sometimes a Great Notion" is the eleventh episode in the fourth season of the reimagined Battlestar Galactica. It aired on television on Sci Fi and Space in the United States and Canada respectively on January 16, 2009 and on Sky One in the United Kingdom on January 20, 2009. This episode is the first after the mid-season finale of the fourth season ("Revelations"), which aired in June 2008. The episode title is a reference to the novel of the same name, written by Ken Kesey. The episode was also the last to be written before the 2007–2008 Writers Guild of America strike. It received a Nielsen rating of 1.6 and was received positively throughout.

The episode continues from "Revelations", where both the colonial fleet and the rebel Cylons finally found Earth, only to find it devastated by a nuclear holocaust at least 2,000 years before, and the discovery leads to despair all across the fleet. The episode was not given an opening title sequence, but the survivor count for the episode was 39,651.

This episode is followed by ten The Face of the Enemy webisodes before the next regular episode.

== Plot ==
Both the Human fleet and the rebel Cylons are disillusioned after finding Earth devastated by a nuclear holocaust, which occurred at least 2,000 years before the events of the episode. The Cylons and Dr. Baltar (James Callis) conclude that bodies they exhume are not human, but Cylon. The rebel Cylons say the mechanical Cylon remains resemble older Centurions of theirs, but are of a kind unknown to them, and postulate that the thirteenth tribe consisted of Cylons that moved to Earth from Kobol. Admiral Adama (Edward James Olmos) withholds this theory when he addresses the fleet, leaving them to believe that the thirteenth tribe was human. Meanwhile, Samuel Anders (Michael Trucco), Galen Tyrol (Aaron Douglas) and Tory Foster (Rekha Sharma) receive memories showing they had lived and died on Earth 2,000 years ago. Kara Thrace (Katee Sackhoff) has Leoben (Callum Keith Rennie) help track the origins of the beacon. They find a crashed Colonial Viper containing a corpse with Starbuck's dog tags. After Kara recites what the Hybrid has told her, a shaken Leoben retreats, with Thrace wondering what she is. In shock, Thrace takes the body and burns it on a pyre, and decides to not tell anyone about what she found, making people believe she lost the signal.

In the fleet, President Roslin (Mary McDonnell) burns her book of Pythia, and is unable to address the fleet, feeling discouraged she led the fleet to their doom, believing the prophecy a false lost cause. Lee Adama (Jamie Bamber) and Anastasia Dualla (Kandyse McClure) revisit their relationship, and after their nostalgic evening together, Dualla returns to her quarters feeling more joyful than she had in months, then with a smile promptly dies by suicide with a shot to the head. Devastated, Admiral Adama acquires a handgun from a marine and attempts to goad Tigh (Michael Hogan) into killing him. After Tigh refuses, a dejected Adama reminisces about past memories. Tigh reminds Adama of his duties as commander of the fleet. Adama eventually steps back into the CIC, and announces that he will find a home for the fleet, orders a search for nearby habitable star systems, and invites their new Cylon allies to join them. As the fleet prepares to leave Earth, which is determined to be uninhabitable, D'Anna (Lucy Lawless), devastated by the knowledge that history repeats itself, decides to "get off the merry-go-round" and remain on Earth to die, rather than being hunted by Cavil.

Tigh walks into the sea and receives a flashback of his life on Earth. In the vision, Tigh sees his wife Ellen (Kate Vernon) during the destruction of the planet. Ellen reassures him that "everything is in place" and they will be "reborn, again, together." Shocked, Tigh realizes that Ellen is the final member of the Final Five.

== Production ==
=== Writing ===
This episode was written back-to-back with the Season 4.0 episode, "Revelations." According to co-writer David Weddle, the title of episode was chosen as co-writers David Weddle and Bradley Thompson outlined their story for the producers. The title is taken from the Ken Kesey novel Sometimes a Great Notion, a favorite of Weddle's. While writing the novel, Kesey made notes in which he urged himself to make the novel's protagonist quit living, and this became the theme of this episode as well. Weddle said that he and the other writers were inspired by the idea of taking a strong, heroic character and piling misfortunes on him or her until finally the character breaks:

What happens in that moment? Does he despair? Does he get up and go on? For me, there is no more defining moment for a character. We tried to do this with almost all the characters in this episode: [Adama], Laura, Kara, Lee. We ripped everything out from under them then sat back to see what they would do. What were their individual breaking points? And if they did break, would they stay broken or grope toward a recovery?

The "fox in the river" story told by Admiral Adama comes from the novel, and also from real-life incidents with wildlife swimming out to sea near Weddle's home in Malibu, California.

The decision to have Lt. Dualla commit suicide in this episode was made after the writing staff felt there had to be fallout from discovering that Earth was a nuclear ruin. Moore explained:

There had to be a cost. There had to be a price somebody paid for that discovery. Not everybody could take that. Not everyone could just say, "OK, that didn't work out, let's go on to next week's episode." It felt like somebody would just say, "No, I'm done. I just want to find a little moment of time where I can feel good about myself one last time, then I'm finished with this long nightmare." And that seemed like that would be Dualla.

Dualla fit this best because she had lost two men whom she loved, and all she had left was the hope of finding Earth. Moore also came up with the idea that Dualla's suicide was actually an act of hope and control, not despair.

Although the network had concerns that the script was too depressing, Moore successfully defended the writing by saying that it might be the last episode of the series and that viewers who had stuck with the show for three and a half seasons would not be put off by yet another "dark" episode. Writers Weddle and Thompson considered giving the characters some leeway in interpreting what they had found. Among the options debated were giving the fleet some hope that Earth might be some other planet, allowing a character to discover a new part of the Prophecy of Pythia, giving one of the characters a vision of an Earth-like planet, and placing a clue in the ruins that would direct the fleet to yet another planet. All were rejected.

Weddle and Thompson also worked extensively on the scene in which Admiral Adama tries to provoke Col. Tigh into killing him. Moore encouraged Weddle and Thompson to give the Adama character progressively crueler lines. The writers were the ones who inserted the line in the script in which Adama mentions Ellen Tigh's sexual infidelity. On the set, however, actor Edward James Olmos changed the line from Adama saying Ellen wanted a man with "real blood in his veins" to "main vein," then ad-libbed the line in which the character said, "I could smell her." The scenes where Dualla finds the set of jacks and where Laura Roslin holds the plant cutting were added by director Michael Nankin. Weddle notes that although Nankin usually peppers his writers with script notes, he did not do so for this script.

Cost estimates indicated that the script, as originally written, would be $300,000 over budget (about two-and-a-half times what the studio would have permitted) and a number of scenes were cut. An extensive opening segment which would have depicted the destruction of Earth was changed to the filmed segment in which Tyrol sees a flash of light and his shadow is left on a wall. However, Nankin restored the scene in which Helo, Dualla, Adama, and Roslin ride back to Galactica in the Raptor.

=== The Fifth Cylon ===
Ellen and Saul Tigh have "always been Cylons, and there’s something profound about that. They’re a married couple who just have to go at it periodically and just have major issues and major problems. But the bond between the two of them was something that literally could not be broken. And I thought that was a really interesting and ultimately very positive thing to say."

— Ronald D. Moore talking about Ellen Tigh being the final Cylon

According to showrunner Ronald D. Moore, the concept of Ellen and Saul Tigh's relationship being more than an average husband-and-wife relationship went back to the pilot mini-series for Battlestar Galactica but was not made part of the story arc for the two characters until the middle of Season 3. As writing progressed on the episode "Torn," the writing staff needed to explain why Baltar would not see all 12 Cylon models aboard the base star. Moore came up with the concept of five Cylon models that had yet to be revealed. Later, during writing sessions for the episode "Rapture," D'Anna Biers has a vision in which she confronts the Final Five Cylons in the opera house, and apologizes to one of them. Although Moore and the writing team had yet to formally settle on Ellen Tigh as one of the Final Five, Moore says it was his intention for the Cylon to be Ellen. When one of the final four Cylons was revealed to be Saul Tigh in the episode "Crossroads," Moore finally decided to make Ellen the fifth Cylon because "Tigh being revealed as a Cylon was such a profound shift in that character, such a big leap for the show, that it felt really natural that she was also a Cylon."

A clue to the final Cylon's identity was inserted into several episodes, when Col. Tigh sees Ellen's face on the Number Six model. Moore's decision was revealed to the writing team at series writers' conference which occurred between Season 3 and Season 4. Other characters were considered as the final Cylon model, but the writing staff agreed none had the same resonance as Ellen Tigh. The decision to reveal Ellen Tigh's true identity in "Sometimes A Great Notion" was made because Moore did not want Season 4.5 to devolve into a guessing game about who the final Cylon might be, and because he wanted the final episode of the series to be about issues other than who the final Cylon was.

=== Writers' strike ===
The script for "Sometimes A Great Notion" was the only script finished when the 2007–2008 Writers Guild of America strike began. Revised script pages were turned in the day before the strike. Moore decided that the crew should proceed as if shooting would be green-lit, and flew to Vancouver, British Columbia, to speak to the cast and crew before the strike began. The strike proved so vexing that the studio did not give approval for shooting to occur until the night before it was to begin.

The cast and crew were very emotional during filming, as they were concerned that this might be the last episode ever filmed and the series cancelled if the strike was a lengthy one. Olmos helped to work up the cast's emotions for the shoot by telling everyone that the show was ending. According to co-writer Weddle, Olmos repeatedly told the cast, "This is the end, I think we all feel that. They're not going to bring the show back. They'll pull the sets down. We'll never shoot another episode." Actress Kandyse McClure improvised the lullaby her character hums before committing suicide, and series composer Bear McCreary used the melody for part of the episode's musical soundtrack.

=== Filming ===
The producers intended for this episode to be the last to star Lucy Lawless, who portrayed Number Three. They only had Lawless for one day during the filming of the episode. Most of the Earth scenes were shot on and around Centennial Beach, in Tsawwassen, British Columbia. Two days before the shoot much of the location set was destroyed by a rain storm with 90 kilometres per hour (56 mph) winds, but the art department crew repaired it in time for the shoot to occur on schedule.

The final shots for the episode "Revelations" were filmed in the three hours immediately preceding the shooting of the beach scenes for "Sometimes A Great Notion." Director Michael Rymer, who helmed "Revelations," and Nankin agreed that all Earth sequences should be reminiscent of the work of film director Ingmar Bergman, so wide camera lenses were used, the color was desaturated, and long rather than short takes were used.

The scene in which Adama goads Tigh was scheduled to last a day. Originally the segment was to be shot in small bits and flashbacks edited between each line, but the scene was instead shot as one long take. Actors Olmos and Michael Hogan struggled for several hours to find the right emotional tone. Moore said that the audience should accept the irradiated planet as Earth. "They have found Earth. This is the Earth that the 13th Colony discovered, they christened it Earth. They found Earth."

== Reception ==
"Sometimes a Great Notion" was seen by 2.1 million total viewers in the U.S., earning the episode a 1.6 household rating. This included 1.3 million adults age 18-to-49 (the show's target demographic), and 1.4 million adults age 25-to-54. The episode was the top cable program in the 10 p.m. slot among men age 18-to-49 and men age 25-to-54 the night it premiered. The ratings for the episode increased 23 percent over the Season 4.0 average in household ratings and total viewers, increased 21 percent over the same period for adults age 18-to-49, and increased 15 percent over the same period for adults age 25-to-54. According to Nielsen live-plus-seven-day ratings data, an additional 0.7 million viewers watched the episode via time-shifted digital video recorder, a 32 percent increase over the day-of-delivery airing. Time-shifted viewing added 540,000 adults aged 18-to-49 (a 38 percent increase over same-day numbers) and 500,000 viewers aged 25-to-54 (a 35 percent rise).

Eric Goldman of IGN gave "Sometimes a Great Notion" an "incredible" rating of 9.5 out of 10. The reviewer quoted the episode as "stronger and sadder than ever," and was executed "extremely well." Goldman felt that the episode did not back down from the deeply powerful storylines from the past, and praised the emotions of the fleet after finding Earth in ruins. The Guardian received the episode positively, stating how many events happened during the course of the episode, and felt that the episode played fair with its audience, despite the number of new questions being addressed. It was anticipated that Dualla would play a big part in the episode after her appearance from the cold open. Her suicide was compared with Boomer shooting Adama in the closing scene of season 1 in a dramatical sense. The Guardian also praised the performance between Edward James Olmos and Mary McDonnell's characters, as well as the standoff between Adama and Tigh.

Matt Norris of Cinema Blend stated that most of the events portrayed in the episode were unexpected, including Dualla's suicide, Starbuck finding her own supposed body, discovering the thirteenth tribe were Cylons, and that Ellen Tigh is the final model, but still thought the episode was among the top five Battlestar Galactica episodes in its run. Marc Bernardin of Entertainment Weekly stated that a lot had been going on in the episode, but criticised the writers' decision of having Ellen as the fifth Cylon. While Dualla's suicide was surprising for Bernardin, he was critical about the Adama scene after her suicide, stating it as "some of Olmos' worst acting in the series", and that the answered questions for the episode raised more questions, but felt the episode was good overall. Alan Sepinwall of The Star-Ledger commented: "What really grabs me about the show (as I discussed in today's column) is its humanity, the way its characters react to situations the way you imagine real, contemporary people might" and felt that "as the stakes for the characters has risen, so has the intensity of [the actors'] performances," with even the extras in character. Maureen Ryan of the Chicago Tribune praised Nankin's directing, particularly "the moment in which we see Kara Thrace, silhouetted in black against a dark blue sky, preparing to burn “her” body—that’s sent a shiver down my spine. That was just such a beautifully operatic image, spot-on in tone and perfectly executed."
