= Battlestar Galactica (2004 TV series) =

American sci-fi television series (2003–2009)

- Genre: Military science fiction; Political drama; Post-apocalyptic; Space opera
- Based on: Battlestar Galactica by Glen A. Larson
- Developed by: Ronald D. Moore
- Showrunner: Ronald D. Moore
- Starring: Edward James Olmos; Mary McDonnell; Katee Sackhoff; Jamie Bamber; James Callis; Tricia Helfer; Grace Park
- Music by: Bear McCreary
- Opening theme: "Gayatri" by Richard Gibbs; Bear McCreary
- Country of origin: United States
- Original language: English
- No. of seasons: 4 (+ miniseries)
- No. of episodes: 76 (+ 2 TV films) (list of episodes)

Production
- Executive producers: Ronald D. Moore; David Eick
- Producer: Harvey Frand; Ron French; Bradley Thompson; David Weddle; Michael Rymer
- Production locations: Vancouver, British Columbia, Canada
- Cinematography: Stephen McNutt
- Running time: 44 minutes
- Production companies: David Eick Productions; R&D TV; Universal Media Studios (Note: Credited as NBC Universal Television Studio (2004–2007).) (2004–2008); Universal Cable Productions (2009)

Original release
- Network: Sci-Fi
- Release: December 8, 2003 – October 27, 2009

Related
- Battlestar Galactica (1978); Galactica 1980; Battlestar Galactica miniseries (2003); Caprica (2010); Battlestar Galactica: Blood & Chrome (2012)

Battlestar Galactica is an American military science fiction television series, and part of the Battlestar Galactica franchise. The show was developed by Ronald D. Moore and executive produced by Moore and David Eick as a "re-imagining" of the 1978 Battlestar Galactica television series created by Glen A. Larson. The pilot for the series first aired as a three-hour miniseries in December 2003 on the Sci-Fi Channel, which was then followed by four regular seasons, ending its run on March 20, 2009. The cast includes Edward James Olmos, Mary McDonnell, Katee Sackhoff, Jamie Bamber, James Callis, Tricia Helfer, and Grace Park.

Battlestar Galactica is set in a distant star system, where a civilization of humans live on a group of planets known as the Twelve Colonies of Kobol. In the past, the Colonies had been at war with an android race of their own creation, known as the Cylons. With the unwitting help of a human scientist named Gaius Baltar (Callis), the Cylons launch a sudden sneak attack on the Colonies, laying waste to the planets and devastating their populations. Out of a population of several billion, there are about 50,000 human survivors; most were aboard civilian space ships that were not near the initial attacks. Of all the Colonial Fleet, the Battlestar Galactica (an older ship about to be decommissioned and turned into a museum) appears to be the only military capital ship that survived the attack. Under the leadership of Colonial Fleet officer Commander William "Bill" Adama (Olmos) and President Laura Roslin (McDonnell), the Galactica and its crew take up the task of leading the small fleet of refugee survivors into space in search of a fabled thirteenth colony known as Earth.

The series received critical acclaim at the time and since, including a Peabody Award, the Television Critics Association's Program of the Year Award, placement in Time's 100 Best TV Shows of All-Time and 19 Emmy nominations for its writing, directing, costume design, visual effects, sound mixing and sound editing, with three Emmy wins (visual effects and sound editing). In 2019, The New York Times placed the show on its list of "The 20 Best TV Dramas Since The Sopranos", a period many critics call a "golden age of television".

The series was followed by the prequel spin-off TV series Caprica, which aired for one season in 2010. A further spin-off, Battlestar Galactica: Blood & Chrome, was released in November 2012 as a web series of ten 10-minute episodes and aired on February 10, 2013, on Syfy as a televised movie.

== Series overview ==
Season	Episodes	Originally released		
Season	Episodes	First released	Last released	Network
Miniseries	2	December 8, 2003	December 9, 2003	Sci-Fi Channel
1	13	October 18, 2004	January 24, 2005	Sci-Fi Channel / Sky1
2	20	July 15, 2005	September 23, 2005	Sci-Fi Channel
2	20	January 6, 2006	March 10, 2006	Sci-Fi Channel
3	20	October 6, 2006	March 25, 2007	Sci-Fi Channel
Razor		November 24, 2007		Sci-Fi Channel
4	21	April 4, 2008	June 13, 2008	Sci-Fi Channel
4	21	January 16, 2009	March 20, 2009	Sci-Fi Channel
The Plan		October 27, 2009		Sci-Fi Channel

Battlestar Galactica continued from the 2003 miniseries to chronicle the journey of the last surviving humans from the Twelve Colonies of Kobol, after their nuclear annihilation by the Cylons. The survivors are led by President Laura Roslin and Commander William Adama in a ragtag fleet of ships with the Battlestar Galactica, an old but powerful warship, as its command ship. Pursued by Cylons intent on wiping out the remnants of the human race, the survivors travel across the galaxy looking for the fabled and long-lost "thirteenth" colony: Earth. Unlike most space opera series, Battlestar Galactica has no humanoid aliens (the antagonists are man-made Cylon androids), the primary armaments used by both military forces utilize bullets, rail guns, and missiles instead of lasers, and the series intentionally avoids technobabble. Instead, most of the stories deal with the apocalyptic fallout of the destruction of the Twelve Colonies upon the survivors, and the moral choices they must make as they deal with the decline of the human race and their war with the Cylons. Stories also portray the concept of perpetuated cycles of hate and violence driving the human-Cylon conflict, and religion, with the implication of a "God" whose possibly angelic agents appear to certain main characters (most notably Gaius Baltar).

Over the course of the show's four seasons, the war between the Colonials and the Cylons takes many twists and turns. Despite the animosity on both sides, the humans and a faction of the Cylons eventually form an uneasy alliance, in the wake of the Cylon Civil War. The Cylon leader, a Cylon-humanoid "Number One" named John Cavil, precipitated the schism in the Cylon ranks. Cavil deceives the other models by obsessively hiding the identities and origins of the remaining five humanoid Cylon models, the "Final Five", who, known only to him, are a more ancient type of Cylon, created by a previous iteration of human civilization. Other plotlines involve the mysterious destiny of Kara "Starbuck" Thrace, who is the subject of a prophecy claiming that she is the "Harbinger of Death" who will "lead them all [humanity] to its end", as well as the redemption of Gaius Baltar through the Cylons' monotheistic religion, after he becomes a pariah within the fleet.

In the final episodes, an inexplicably resurrected Kara Thrace leads the surviving humans and their Cylon allies to a new planet, which Adama names "Earth". The first group of survivors settle in ancient Africa. The "real" Earth that the Colonials had searched for during their years in space was revealed in an earlier episode to have been originally inhabited thousands of years before by a previous form of humanoid Cylons; the "Final Five" were the last of these Cylons. Ironically, these humanoid Cylons had created their own Centurion robotic slaves, who waged a nuclear attack against their masters, devastating the planet and making it uninhabitable. The new Earth is found to be inhabited by early humans, who are genetically compatible with the humans from Galactica and the rest of the fleet, but who possess only the most rudimentary civilization.

The surviving humans and humanoid Cylons settle on the new planet Earth; they discard all technology, destroying the fleet by flying it into the Sun, in an attempt to break the human-Cylon cycle of conflict and begin anew with the tribal humans already present on the new Earth. The surviving Cylon Centurions are given possession of the remaining Cylon Basestar, and proceed to jump away from Earth. In the final scenes, modern-day Earth humans are shown to be descendants of the colonists, their humanoid Cylon allies, and the early humans.

At the end of the series finale, an angelic Baltar and Cylon Number Six are walking along a sidewalk in modern-day New York City. They are unseen and unheard by the people around them. As the two walk, they notice technologically advanced robots, computers, and other cybernetic devices, and they talk about the technological advancements the humans have made since the Colonials and Humanoid Cylons first arrived on this Earth, over 150,000 years earlier. Cylon Number Six and Baltar have an exchange over one of the ongoing themes from the series: "All of this has happened before. But the question remains, does all of this have to happen again?" Consequently, the revelation that Battlestar Galactica takes place in our collective prehistoric past means that unlike most space opera science fiction stories, the series is a fictional tale of ancient history rather than future history, and serves as a fictional tale of origin for modern humanity.

== Cast and characters ==
=== Main cast ===
- Edward James Olmos as (CDR/ADM) William Adama, commanding officer of Battlestar Galactica; his call sign was "Husker" when he was a young Viper pilot
- Mary McDonnell as President Laura Roslin, sole survivor of the former Colonial Government; was Secretary of Education before the destruction of the Colonies
- Katee Sackhoff as (LT/CAPT) Kara "Starbuck" Thrace, hotshot Viper pilot of Galactica
- Jamie Bamber as (CAPT/MAJ/CDR) Lee "Apollo" Adama, elder son of William Adama, CAG of Galactica, later CO of Battlestar Pegasus
- James Callis as Dr. Gaius Baltar, a brilliant scientist, and later President
- Tricia Helfer as Number Six, a humanoid Cylon
- Grace Park as:
  - Number Eight, a humanoid Cylon
  - (LTJG) Sharon "Boomer" Valerii, Raptor pilot of Galactica; a copy of Number Eight
  - (LTJG) Sharon "Athena" Agathon, another copy of Number Eight; later also a Raptor pilot of Galactica

=== Supporting cast ===
- Michael Hogan as (COL) Saul Tigh, executive officer of Galactica
- Aaron Douglas as (CPO) Galen Tyrol a.k.a. "Chief", leader of the combined engineering/maintenance/safety/supply department, senior non-commissioned officer of Galactica
- Tahmoh Penikett as (LT/CAPT) Karl "Helo" Agathon, an electronic warfare officer of a Raptor, paired with "Athena"
- Alessandro Juliani as (LTJG) Felix Gaeta, combat information center tactical officer of Galactica
- Kandyse McClure as (PO2/LTJG) Anastasia Dualla a.k.a. "Dee", CIC communications officer of Galactica, later married to Lee Adama
- Paul Campbell as Billy Keikeya, personal aide of President Roslin
- Nicki Clyne as (SPC) Cally Henderson, member of the landing bay deck crew of Galactica, later married to "Chief" Tyrol
- Michael Trucco as (ENS) Samuel "Longshot" Anders, athlete, Caprican resistance leader and later Viper pilot of Galactica

=== Recurring cast ===
==== Galactica ====
- Donnelly Rhodes as (MAJ) Dr. Sherman Cottle, chief medical officer of Galactica
- Bodie Olmos as (LT) Brendan "Hot Dog" Costanza, a Viper pilot of Galactica
- Leah Cairns as (LT) Margaret "Racetrack" Edmondson, an ECO of a Raptor of Galactica
- Rekha Sharma as Tory Foster, President Roslin's PA succeeding Billy
- Kate Vernon as Ellen Tigh, wife of Saul Tigh
- Richard Hatch as Tom Zarek, extremist political figure and former terrorist, later vice-president under Gaius Baltar's Presidency (Hatch played Apollo in the original Battlestar Galactica series.)
- Jen Halley as (SPC / ENS) Diana "Hardball" Seelix, a Viper pilot of Galactica
- Luciana Carro as (LT / CAPT) Louanne "Kat" Katraine, a Viper pilot of Galactica
- Sam Witwer as (LT) Alex "Crashdown" Quartararo, a Raptor ECO, paired with "Boomer" after "Helo" being stranded on Caprica
- Dominic Zamprogna as (SPC) James "Jammer" Lyman, a deckhand of Galactica, later an officer in the New Caprica Police (NPC)
- Mark Sheppard as Romo Lampkin, an appointed public defender of Gaius Baltar
- Michelle Forbes as (RADM) Helena Cain, CO of Battlestar Pegasus

==== Cylons ====
- Callum Keith Rennie as Leoben Conoy, an arms dealer and smuggler/Number Two, a humanoid Cylon
- Matthew Bennett as Aaron Doral, a public relations specialist/Number Five, a humanoid Cylon
- Lucy Lawless as D'Anna Biers, a "Colonial Fleet News" reporter/Number Three, a humanoid Cylon
- Dean Stockwell as Brother John Cavil, a priest/Number One, a humanoid Cylon
- Rick Worthy as Simon O'Neill, a doctor working for the resistance of Caprica/Number Four a humanoid Cylon

== Themes and allusions ==
Time described Battlestar Galactica as "a gripping sci-fi allegory of the war on terror, complete with monotheistic religious fundamentalists (here genocidal cyborgs called Cylons), sleeper cells, civil-liberties crackdowns and even a prisoner-torture scandal". The show attempted to maintain its realism by referring to familiar elements of contemporary history – Laura Roslin's swearing in on Colonial One directly "cited the swearing in of Lyndon B. Johnson after the Kennedy assassination" – and the developing political situation since the September 11, 2001 attacks. Many people have drawn parallels between the Cylons and Al Qaeda" and according to The Guardian "Battlestar Galactica is the only award-winning drama that dares tackle the war on terror". The show has also tackled issues regarding terrorist sleeper cells with stories involving the reality and fear of Cylon suicide attacks, Cylon Number 5 (Aaron Doral) in the episode called "Litmus," sneaks aboard Galactica and blows himself up in the middle of the corridor and sleeper agent Lt. Sharon "Boomer" Valerii activates after destroying a Cylon basestar and shooting Commander Adama at the end of season 1. (Note that Sharon, as with some of the other human-form Cylons, had no idea that she was a Cylon.) Similar themes are revisited in season 3 (Episode 3.1, "Occupation") with a far different perspective: the humans, rather than the Cylons, are the suicide bombers. It has been suggested that these plotlines extensively "hinted at war-on-terrorism overtones." After 9/11, the original series' "broad premise – the human military's struggles in the wake of a massive terrorist attack – suddenly gained resonance" and let the show tackle issues like suicide bombings, torture ("evoking the darker side of the war on terror") and "civil liberties crackdowns".

Executive producer Ronald D. Moore points out that the Cylons and Al Qaeda are not necessarily intended to be allegorical: "They have aspects of Al Qaeda and they have aspects of the Catholic Church and they have aspects of America." On the other hand, abortion is illegal throughout the fleet, because the survival of what remains of humanity is at stake. In contrast, with the New Caprica storyline the show's humans have been discussed as an allegory not for an America under attack but for an occupied people mounting an insurgency and turning to suicide bombings as a tactic. There is a consensus that with "its third season, the show has morphed into a stinging allegorical critique of America's three-year occupation of Iraq" as the "cameras record Cylon occupation raids on unsuspecting human civilians with the night-vision green familiar to any TV news viewer. The reasoning of the Cylons is horrifically familiar, they would prefer not to be brutal but they won't accept the failure of a glorious mission." According to Slate "If this sounds like Iraq, it should", and "In unmistakable terms, Battlestar Galactica is telling viewers that insurgency (like, say, the one in Iraq) might have some moral flaws, such as the whole suicide bombing thing, but is ultimately virtuous and worthy of support." The "really audacious stroke of this season was showing us a story about a suicide bomber from the point of view of the bomber and his comrades... because the cause of this terrorist was unquestioningly our own. We sympathize with the insurgents wholeheartedly." If the Cylon occupying force is an allegory of the Coalition Forces in Iraq, then some of the other references are equally controversial; the "scene of the shiny, terrifying Cylon centurions (a servant class of robots that actually look like robots) marching down the main road of New Caprica while the devastated colonists looked on was the Nazis marching into Paris."

Although David Eick has said the production staff "don't need to say 'OK, let's do the episode where we're gonna do the Abu Ghraib scandal'" and points out that events depicted on New Caprica "are as much a story rooted in political tales like the Vichy France or Vietnam" as current events, he acknowledges that they "do gravitate in those directions when it comes to the storytelling".

== Music ==
The opening theme is a new-age-inflected version of the Gayatri Mantra, a Hindu hymn dedicated to the solar deity Savitr.

Bear McCreary was the primary composer for the television series, having assisted Richard Gibbs on the 3-hour miniseries. When the show was picked up, Gibbs opted not to devote full-time to the regular series' production and McCreary became the composer. He scored over 70 episodes. Six Battlestar Galactica soundtrack albums have been released to great critical acclaim - one for the miniseries, one for each of the four seasons, and one combining music from the inter-season Razor and post-finale prequel The Plan. The Chicago Tribune's Maureen Ryan hailed the music as "sensational" and "innovative", Joanna Weiss of The Boston Globe praised McCreary as a "visionary composer" who did much to create "the rich atmosphere of Battlestar", Alan Sepinwall, then of The Star-Ledger described McCreary's work on the show as "transcendent" and Variety said "Galactica offers some of the most innovative music on TV today."

The music of Battlestar Galactica displays a wide variety of influences and intentionally tries to avoid the "usual" style of a science fiction score. For some of the series' more important episodes, McCreary was granted a full orchestra. Character themes and leitmotifs gradually took on importance, despite being avoided earlier. A variety of instruments have been used. One season 4 episode employed: Chinese membrane flute, Indian bansuri flute, duduk (Armenian woodwind), erhu (Chinese violin), yaylı tambur (a Turkish lute), dumbek (Middle Eastern drum), Japanese taiko drums and four brass players, 30 string players and a 12-voice choir.

There have been several live concerts featuring the music of Battlestar Galactica. In April 2008, more than 1,000 fans attended two sold-out shows at L.A.'s Roxy on Sunset Boulevard, with some fans flying in from as far as England and Australia. A ballet based on McCreary's scores for Galactica premiered on March 7, 2009, for a 13-week run. Entitled "Prelude to War", it was performed by the dancers of the Theaterhagen in Hagen, Germany with choreography by Ricardo Fernando, and the Hagen Philharmonic Orchestra conducted by Bernhard Steiner.

== Broadcast and release ==
The first season originally premiered in the United Kingdom, on October 18, 2004, on Sky1. The first season was co-commissioned by Sky Television and Sci-Fi Channel. Season 1 began airing in North America three months later, on January 14, 2005, in the United States, and January 15 in Canada. The first episode aired in the U.S. became one of the highest-rated programs ever on Sci-Fi, with 3.1 million viewers. Subsequent episodes proved equally successful. The first episode of the season was later made available for viewing in its entirety, and without charge from the Sci-Fi website. Moore also sought to address the "Internet Generation" by posting podcast commentaries on individual episodes on the official Sci-Fi website.

Following the success of the 13-episode first season, the Sci-Fi Channel ordered a 20-episode second season on February 23, 2005. The season premiered in the United States on the Sci-Fi Channel on July 15, 2005, with the UK, Ireland, and Canadian premiere in January 2006. In fall 2005, airing of the second season halted, as it was part of Sci-Fi Channel's standard airing schedule normally used for its Stargate series, which was to split a 20-episode season into two parts (a "winter season" and a "summer season") to avoid heavy competition with major networks that follow a spring/fall schedule. The second half of season 2 ("Season 2.5") began airing on January 6, 2006, after a three-month hiatus.

The Sci-Fi Channel ordered a 20-episode third season on November 16, 2005, with production beginning in April 2006 in Vancouver, British Columbia. The season premiered in the United States on October 6, 2006, in Canada the following day, and in the UK on January 9, 2007; with the first two episodes being shown together. The broadcast schedule for season 3 did not include a long hiatus in the middle of the season, as with season 2. The Sci-Fi Channel moved the series to Sundays on January 21, 2007, the first time the show had changed nights since it began airing. Season 3 was broadcast in high-definition on Sky 1 HD in the UK and Ireland, starting on January 9, 2007, and in the U.S. on Universal HD, starting on January 27, 2007.

The Sci-Fi Channel confirmed on May 31, 2007, that Battlestar Galactica had been renewed for a fourth season of 22 episodes, which producers David Eick and Ronald D. Moore later announced to be the series' last. Preceding this was the airing of the Razor TV movie (comprising two of the ordered broadcast hours), while the remaining season of 20 episodes was split into two halves, due to the 2007–2008 Writers Guild of America strike. The first half comprised episodes 3 to 10, while the second half comprised episodes 11 to 22. The series finale aired on March 20, 2009.

The first two slots of season 4's 22-episode order were taken up by the two-hour TV movie Razor, which was broadcast as an unbroken extended episode detailing the chronicles of the Battlestar Pegasus. It premiered November 24, 2007 in the U.S. and December 18, 2007, in the UK, with a limited U.S. theatrical engagement in major cities, and an extended version was released on DVD the following week. Razor had Michelle Forbes reprise her role as Helena Cain, and co-starred Australian actress Stephanie Chaves-Jacobsen, who played Kendra Shaw.

The first half of season 4 (dubbed "Season 4.0" in its DVD release) consisted of ten episodes, and premiered April 4, 2008. The Canadian cable channel Space aired season 4 on the same dates. In the UK, Sky1 began airing season 4 on April 15, showing the first two episodes on that date, placing the UK four days behind the U.S. airing. The first part of season 4 began broadcast on Universal HD on August 30, 2008. In Australia, the first half of season 4 began screening on Ten HD on September 4, 2008, beginning with Razor. Linking both halves of season 4 together was a set of ten webisodes, which played a similar role to that which The Resistance played between seasons 2 and 3. Battlestar Galactica: The Face of the Enemy was released during the weeks leading up to the premiere of episode 13, starting on December 12, 2008, and ending on January 12, 2009. The second half of season 4 (dubbed "Season 4.5", and marketed in the UK as "the Final Season") consisted of ten episodes, and began airing on January 16, 2009. The season (and series) finale was split into two episodes in the U.S., with the normal-length first part airing on March 13, and the second, with a runtime (including advertisements) of two hours and eleven minutes, airing March 20.

In Australia, the second half of season 4 premiered on the Australian Sci-Fi Channel on Foxtel January 31, and continued on a weekly basis with each of the remaining episodes of the series airing about six hours after the U.S. broadcast, until the final episode on March 21.

The show re-ran on BBC America in 2011, including all 4 seasons and the two-part miniseries.

=== Continuation ===
On April 27, 2006, the Sci Fi Channel announced that a prequel spin-off of BSG was in development. Caprica takes place more than 50 years before the main series, before the original Cylon War, and chronicles the Adama family and Caprican society, showing the advancement of technology leading to the Cylon revolt. On March 18, 2008, Ronald Moore, the head writer, confirmed that Caprica would in fact be produced beginning with a two-hour backdoor pilot. On December 2, 2008, SCI FI announced that it had approved the full series. The first season, composed of 20 episodes including the pilot, premiered on January 22, 2010. An uncut version of the pilot was released on DVD on April 21, 2009, prior to the series' broadcast debut.

On July 24, 2009, Edward James Olmos suggested that The Plan would not be the last BSG movie, saying that he had written a script involving Galactica characters in which a crisis occurs at some point after their arrival on Earth.

On March 15, 2010, Syfy executive Mark Stern said that Syfy was working with Ronald D. Moore to develop a second spinoff of Battlestar Galactica, which would "mark a return to the franchise's space-opera roots" and "not necessarily be a traditional series." On July 27, 2010, it was revealed that the series would be called Blood & Chrome, featuring William Adama during the First Cylon War, and written by Michael Taylor. The series was distributed as a 10-episode online series on Machinima.com starting November 9, 2012, and aired as a televised movie on February 10, 2013, on Syfy.

=== Home media ===
The miniseries was released in region 2 on March 1, 2004, and in region 1 on December 28, 2004, and included deleted scenes, audio commentary, and a behind-the-scenes documentary. The first season was released to DVD on March 28, 2005, and September 20, 2005, in region 2 and region 1 respectively and included deleted scenes. The region 1 set also included featurettes, and a tongue-in-cheek promotional special filmed for the Sci Fi Channel in addition to the miniseries. However, it does not contain the special features that were included on the miniseries stand alone DVD release.

The second season was released in its entirety in a single volume in regions 2 and 4, but issued in two separate volumes (dubbed "Season 2.0" and "Season 2.5") in the region 1, which corresponded with the mid-season break in the broadcast schedule. Each region 1 volume contains half of the season, along with deleted scenes and podcasts that were previously available on the official website. "Season 2.5" also contains an extended version of "Pegasus", the last episode of the first half of the season. The region 2 DVDs include the extended version of "Pegasus", as well as the commentaries and deleted scenes from the region 1 "2.0" release, but do not contain any of the commentaries and deleted scenes from the "2.5" release (other than the extended "Pegasus" episode), nor the original, shorter version of "Pegasus" included on the region 1 "2.0" release. The Canadian DVD release of "Season 2.0" was delayed until April 25, 2006, as the episodes had only begun airing in January 2006.

The third season was released in region 1 on March 18, 2008, in region 2 on September 3, 2007, and in region 4 on November 20, 2007. The region 2 and 4 DVDs do not contain any extras but region 2's box set comes with a 45-minute recap of the previous two seasons (consisting of clips of the seasons strung together with a voice-over). The fourth season, like season 2, was released in two parts. In regions 1, 2 and 4, the television movie Razor is included in "Season 4.0" (as it is technically a part of the season despite it being released separately at an earlier date). In region 1, however, both the extended and shortened versions of Razor are included in the "4.0" box set.

On August 14, 2007, Universal Studios Home Entertainment announced that the miniseries and season 1 would be released on December 4, 2007, in region 1, on the now discontinued high definition disc format HD DVD. The technical specifications include 1080p/VC-1 transfers of the miniseries and each episode is in 16:9 widescreen aspect ratio, plus Dolby TrueHD 5.1 surround sound and Dolby Digital-Plus 5.1 surround audio options. Each individual season has also subsequently been released on Blu-ray Disc.

The complete series set was released on DVD and Blu-ray Disc on July 28, 2009, in limited edition packaging and with a Cylon Centurion figurine in certain territories. It was re-released on April 6, 2010, in new packaging, with the Region 1 re-release now including The Plan TV movie (this was not included in the Region 2 release).

== Reception ==
=== Critical response ===
==== Praise ====
Throughout its run, the series earned critical acclaim from Time, National Review, Rolling Stone, Newsday, The New York Times, The New Yorker, the San Francisco Chronicle, the Chicago Tribune, and Entertainment Weekly.

Diane Werts of Newsday wrote: "You can look at this saga any way you want—as political drama, religious debate, psychological suspenser, sci-fi adventure, deep metaphor or just plain fun—and it's scintillating from every angle." Robert Bianco of USA Today commented: "Driven by violence and rage, Galactica is perhaps the darkest space opera American TV has ever produced. In Galactica's future, humans are on the run, and if external enemies don't get us, internal divisions will... You'll understand them [the characters], their conflicts and their desires, because they're recognizable humans in all their glorious complexity. And that's what makes Galactica a great TV series." Peter Suderman of National Review stated that the series is "arguably the most potent, dramatically vibrant series on television. ...[I]t packs the power of a gut punch on screen. For that, much credit is due to the immensely compelling cast of characters... Battlestar Galactica burns with a combustive mixture of political turmoil and human drama that is as achingly real and relevant as anything on television. Jeff Jensen of Entertainment Weekly wrote that the show "has distinguished itself as one of television's very best dramas — on a par with 24, The Wire, and Lost — because it so utterly transcends both its genre and its source material. ...[The] series' sophisticated stories have also attracted a distinctively new breed of fan, one who's not necessarily a sci-fi buff." Moreover, in 2012, Entertainment Weekly listed the show at #7 in the "25 Best Cult TV Shows from the Past 25 Years," saying that producer Moore "expanded the show's central premise into an addictive post-9/11 parable and one of the most critically acclaimed series of the decade." The article credited Starbuck and Number Six as "geek and feminist icons," adding, "best of all, the show introduced this peerless profanity into the national lexicon: Frak !"

Mary McNamara of the Los Angeles Times praised the show's ability to "anchor fantasy with vivid and recognizable human psychology" and declares that the series is "not just a cult hit but a significant piece of television." Maureen Ryan of the Chicago Tribune described it as a "sprawling, enthralling tale of human survival" that is "full of political allegories and fascinating, multifaceted characters." She finds, "Like Deadwood, Battlestar Galactica is interested in exploring how a society on the edge decides to govern itself. What rights and actions are sacrosanct, which are outlawed, when most of the human race is eliminated? ... Thanks to a stellar cast and brave writing, Battlestar soars." Throughout its run, the series has often surprised reviewers with its many twists and turns. Ryan comments: "There's nothing like a good Battlestar plot twist to make your head spin, but the 'holy cow' moments aren't the main point (though they're one heck of a tasty side dish). The show and its twists and turns are grounded in deep curiosity about human nature, and how contradictory and confounding it can be."

Matt Soergel of The Florida Times-Union stated: "Its propulsive and complex storytelling is matched by, at best, just a handful of theatrical movies a year." Tim Goodman of the San Francisco Chronicle opines, "Battlestar Galactica transcends the sci-fi genre; it competes, creatively, on the same level as any other top-tier drama." Mark Perigard of the Boston Herald stated: "A drama this gripping comes 'round rarely." James Poniewozik of Time magazine named it one of the 100 best TV shows of all time. Time also wrote in the spring of 2005 that the new show was one of the six best drama programs on television. It would proclaim the program the best show on television in December of the same year. Television Without Pity described Battlestar Galactica as "one of the finest, most beautifully written, expertly acted shows on television." Alan Sepinwall, then of The Star-Ledger wrote: "[W]hat makes Galactica so gripping is its emphasis on character over hardware. The explosions and the killer robots are cool, but they don't stack up to seeing fully-drawn people - brought to life by a great writing staff led by producer Ron Moore and an astonishing cast led by Edward James Olmos and Mary McDonnell - grapple with these life-or-death, genocide-level decisions." Joshua Alston of Newsweek declares that the show "captures better than any other TV drama of the past eight years the fear, uncertainty and moral ambiguity of the post-9/11 world" and "always finds ways to challenge the audience's beliefs." It has also been named the best science fiction series by IGN.com and Boston.com. The series placed #59 on Entertainment Weekly's "New TV Classics" list. Empire ranked it #6 on its list of the 50 Greatest TV Shows of All Time, then reranked it as #12 in a list of the Top 100 Best TV Shows. They explain it was a reboot "done right" with interesting character story arcs. In 2013 TV Guide included it in its list of The 60 Greatest Dramas of All Time and ranked it as the #3 sci-fi show and the #57 best series of all time. Also in 2013, the Writers Guild of America ranked it 38th on their list of the 101 Best-Written TV Series of All Time.

The series also draws praise for having many strong and complex female characters. The Seattle Post-Intelligencer's Melanie McFarland notes, "[Starbuck], played with a tomboyish swagger by Katee Sackhoff, is fast becoming the latest in a long line of feminist television icons."

The series has also received favorable reviews from other writers. Stephen King wrote, "This is a beautifully written show, driven by character rather than effects...but the effects are damn good. And there's not a better acting troupe at work on television." Joss Whedon commented: "I think it's so passionate, textured, complex, subversive and challenging that it dwarfs everything on TV."

On review aggregator website Rotten Tomatoes, the first season has an approval rating of 90% with an average score of 8.4/10 based on 20 reviews; with a critics consensus stating, "A captivating combination of riveting political drama and science fiction fantasy make Battlestar Galactica must-see sci-fi." The second season has an approval rating of 100% with an average score of 9.5/10 based on 12 reviews; with a critics consensus stating, "In its second season, Battlestar Galatica doubles down on the series' high-minded themes and satisfyingly complex storylines." The third season has an approval rating of 100% with an average score of 9/10 based on 20 reviews; with a critics consensus stating, "Dark, charming and unusually thoughtful, Battlestar Galactica's third season continues to improve on the show's most addictive elements." The fourth season has an approval rating of 92% with an average score of 8.1/10 based on 38 reviews; with a critics consensus stating, "Battlestar Galactica's final season proves a satisfying conclusion to TV's best science fiction offering." On Metacritic, seasons 1 and 2 have a score of 89/100, season 3 is scored 94/100, and season 4 is scored 85/100.

==== Criticism ====
Some fans of the original 1970s series opposed the new series since the time it premiered, due to what was perceived as its darker, more confused tone. In a May 2004 article from Dreamwatch magazine titled "Starbuck: Lost in Castration", Dirk Benedict, who portrayed Lieutenant Starbuck in the original series, harshly criticized the new series, citing its dark tone and supposed moral relativism. Benedict devoted the greatest part of the article to criticizing the producers' decision to turn Starbuck into a female character, tying it in to what he perceived as a general anti-masculinity agenda.

Other critics, even those who wrote rave reviews about the first two seasons of the series, felt that a major drop in quality occurred in the third season, continuing into the fourth and final season. In particular, the controversial series finale drew heavy criticism, largely due to the view that it failed to explain many of the main plotlines which had been teased throughout the series' run. Charlie Jane Anders of io9.com wrote:

Even Battlestar Galactica couldn't be Battlestar Galactica for longer than a few years. By halfway through the third season, the cracks are pretty apparent, as the show detours into romance subplots. The writers start throwing out curveballs like randomly selected Cylons and Starbuck's inexplicable (and unexplained) resurrection. By the time the show ended, its mystique was somewhat tarnished, and its ending remains controversial.

Anders later included the series on her list of "10 Once-Great TV Shows (And The Exact Moments They Started to Suck)", saying:

There was a time, not long ago, when BSG was considered the gold standard for science fiction television. Tense, multilayered, complicated, and filled with morally gray characters — it was all the things we always clamor for but seldom get. The show stumbled somewhat in its third season, with the boxing episode and a boring love triangle. But it didn't actually become raw suckage until Starbuck died for no reason, and then came back from the dead for no reason. The writers have basically admitted they had no plan for killing and resurrecting Starbuck — they just thought it would be a cool thing to do, and they would figure out the reasons later. And thus, we ended up with a year of Starbuck Interrupted, constantly shouting "You're going the wrong way!" and playing the piano while talking about her daddy.

In a Commentary article on the prevalence of Bush Derangement Syndrome in popular culture, conservative political commentator Jonah Goldberg analyzed the show's "radically bizarre and nonsensical turn of events ... that led inexorably to its self-destruction":

Originally, the series was very difficult to pigeonhole ideologically. ... When it came time to make the third season ... a show marked by gritty realism about how a decent but flawed civilization modeled on our own tries to cling to its decency while fighting an existential war against an implacable enemy veered wildly off course. The humans were no longer analogized to Americans; rather Americans were analogized to genocidal occupiers. In other words, we are no longer the inspiration for the futuristic Israelites trying to survive. We are now the Nazis.

Fantasy author George R.R. Martin expressed his dissatisfaction with how the writers handled the ending of the TV series, commenting:

Battlestar Galactica ends with 'God Did It.' Looks like somebody skipped Writing 101, when you learn that a deus ex machina is a crappy way to end a story... Yeah, yeah, sometimes the journey is its own reward. I certainly enjoyed much of the journey with BSG... But damn it, doesn't anybody know how to write an ending any more? Writing 101, kids. Adam and Eve, God Did It, It Was All a Dream? I've seen Clarion students left stunned and bleeding for turning in stories with those endings.

Josh Tyler of CinemaBlend concluded that the series finale made no real attempt to resolve any of the plotlines or mysteries set up during the earlier run of the show.

=== Wider influence ===
On March 17, 2009, the United Nations hosted a Battlestar Galactica retrospective including a discussion with Mary McDonnell, Edward James Olmos, Ronald D. Moore and David Eick on human rights, terrorism, children and armed conflict, and reconciliation between civilians and faiths. The discussion was moderated by actress Whoopi Goldberg and also included Radhika Coomaraswamy, the Special Representative of the Secretary-General for Children and Armed Conflict; Craig Mokhiber of the Office of the High Commissioner for Human Rights; Robert C. Orr, Assistant Secretary-General for Policy Planning; and Famatta Rose Osode, from the Permanent Mission of Liberia to the UN.

Battlestar Galactica was the basis for a special session at the 2009 World Science Festival. The session included presentations from Mary McDonnell and Michael Hogan, as well as scientists Hod Lipson and Kevin Warwick.

The Experience Music Project and Science Fiction Museum and Hall of Fame in Seattle organised a special exhibition on the series with props of three spacecraft models and guest speakers starting October 23, 2010.
