= Code name (disambiguation) =

A code name, codename, call sign, or cryptonym is a code word or name used, sometimes clandestinely, to refer to another name, word, project, or person.

Code name(s) or Codename(s) may also refer to:

- Codename (TV series), a short-lived British television series
- Codename, Vol. 2, a 2020 album by Dremo
- Codenames (board game), a 2015 party board game
- Code name: "VXA", 2021 play

== See also ==
- Code (disambiguation)
- CODE
