= Dinadan =

- Matter of Britain character
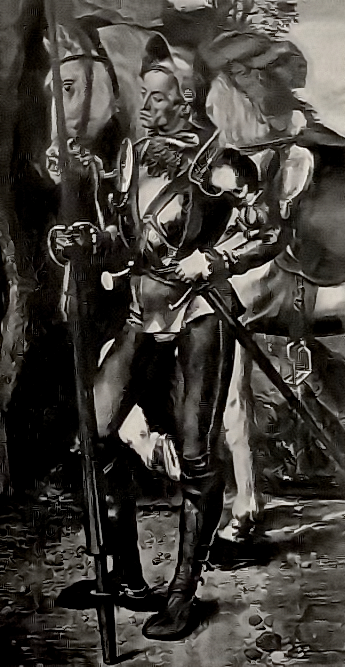
- Sir Dinadan in an illustration for Marion Ames Taggart's poem "The Secret of Sir Dinadan", May 1895 issue of The Catholic World
- First appearance: Prose Tristan

In-universe information
- Title: Sir
- Occupation: Knight of the Round Table
- Family: Bruenor le Noir (senior and junior), Daniel
- Nationality: Cornish

Dinadan (Note: Alternative forms of his name in various texts and manuscripts include Dinadam, Dinadano, Dinaden, Dinadem, Dinadeira, Divdan, Dynadan, Dynadam.) is a Cornish Knight of the Round Table in the Arthurian legend's chivalric romance tradition. In the Prose Tristan and its adaptations, Dinadan is a close friend of the protagonist Tristan, known for his cynical humor and pragmatism, and also for his severe anti-chivalric attitudes. In Thomas Malory's English compilation Le Morte d'Arthur, Dinadan serves as a foil to Tristan in his softened portrayal, appearing in several often comedic episodes until his murder by Mordred and Agravain. Despite his relatively minor role, he has become a major subject of Malorian scholarship.

== Medieval literature ==
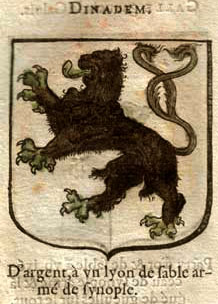
Attributed arms of "Dinadem" (one of many variant forms of the name of Dinadan)

Like Palamedes and Lamorak, Dinadan was introduced in the 13th-century Prose Tristan (Tristan en prose), an Old French reimagination of the legend of Tristan and Iseult. Here, Dinadan is a knight from Cornwall and the son of Bruenor senior, also known as the Good Knight Without Fear. His brothers include fellow Round Table knights Breunor le Noir and Daniel.

Dinadan is introduced to the story to replace the dead Kahedin as the hero Tristan's new close friend and companion, also functioning as a more reasonable part of Tristan. Unlike many other knights in Arthurian romance, the pragmatic Dinadan tends to avoid fights and views courtly love as a futile pursuit, though he displays bravery in battle when necessary. As described by Norris J. Lacy, who called him "one of his most delightful creations" of the Prose Tristan,

Dinadan, a pragmatist and a jovial cynic, consistently questions the conventions of chivalry and condemns, for example, the folly of doing battle for no purpose other than to demonstrate valor. He is equally cynical about love, mocking lovers who are tormented by their emotion; he wants no part of a love that brings not joy but suffering. Dinadan serves as the voice of skeptical reason and practicality.

Early parts of the Prose Tristan initially feature Dinadan as a more of a typical knight errant character of Arthurian romance, less sensible and with limited sarcasm as compared to his characterization in other French tellings, such as the Post-Vulgate Cycle—but not to the one in Thomas Malory's iconic English Arthurian compilation Le Morte d'Arthur, where his character is both already fully established and markedly toned down compared to the corresponding episodes from Malory's French text sources. Dinadan also appears in some other works, such as Escanor and variants of Les Prophéties de Merlin. In the former, Dinadan's deep skepticism towards women serves as a comedic theme. Conversely, there are versions when his attitudes regarding females are portrayed as unsavoury. These include the Prose Tristan manuscript BnF fr. 12599, which depicts Dinadan as a rapist of a young lady, and Micheau Gonnot's Compilation, where he is a would-be rapist, stopped (and punished) by peasants.

In the Prose Tristan, Dinadan outlives the protagonist. A manuscript known as the Suite du Tristan en prose (BnF fr. 24400) is a continuation of the Prose Tristan that contains Dinadan's further story and his own death. It was translated to modern French by Richard Trachsler and published as Les Dernières Aventures de Dinadan (The Last Adventures of Dinadan) in 2025.

=== Le Morte d'Arthur ===
Based on some variants of the Prose Tristan in a highly abridged form, or perhaps a lost English intermediate source, Malory's portrayal of Dinadan (Dynadan) remains a comedic character as he retains some of his French version's cynical humor and inclination towards mocking chivalry, albeit without much of his original ironic commentaries. Dinadan is often depicted as the most witty among Arthur's knights, both the source and target of practical jokes. He is one of the only few able to recognize his fellow knights even when they are wearing full helmets and do not have marked shields, which Helen Cooper interpreted as a female characteristic.

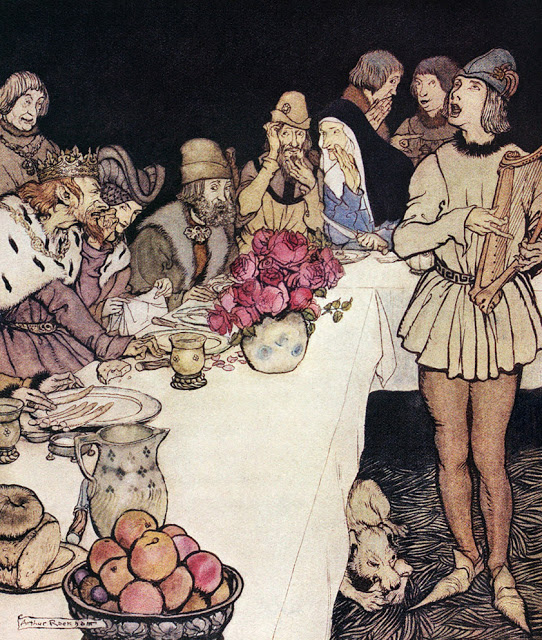
Arthur Rackham's illustration for Alfred W. Pollard's The Romance of King Arthur (1917) depicting a scene from Malory's Le Morte d'Arthur where Eliot the harper sings an insulting lai composed by Dinadan at a feast hosted by King Mark.

During his visit to the court of Cornwall in search of his friend, the young hero Tristan (Tristram), Dinadan shares supper with Queen Iseult (La Beale Isoud), revealing his deliberate choice to have no lady-love or paramour to inspire his noble deeds. In one escapade, he is caught off guard and defeated in a joust by Lancelot, who cleverly wears a dress over his armor and later dresses his unconscious opponent in it, a cross-dressing episode corresponding go the one in the Version IV of the Prose Tristan (and the Prophecies de Merlin) in which men sent by Lancelot and Galehaut forcibly dress Dinadan in a lady's gown as a joke for Queen Guinevere. Albeit reluctantly, Dinadan is also still capable of heroic deeds on an occasion, such as when he helps Tristan to fight off 30 knights of Queen Morgan all at once.

In Le Morte d'Arthur, his end after returning from Cornwall, hoping to persuade King Arthur to reverse his ruling that had reinstated the villainous King Mark on the throne. However, while wounded from his encounter with the evil knight Brehu the Merciless, Dinadan is ambushed and murdered by two other Knights of the Round Table, the treacherous half-brothers Mordred and Agravain, who hate him for his association with their enemy Lamorak from the rival clan of King Pellinore. Lancelot's half-brother Hector de Maris discovers Dinadan mortally wounded and brings him to Camelot, where he dies in Lancelot's arms and is buried by Palamedes in Camelot.

According to Joyce Coleman, "Margaret Schlauch praises the 'courtly realism' depicted in Sir Thomas Malory's Le Morte d'Arthur, especially highlighting 'the comically realistic Sir Dinadan', whose humorous remarks about his fear of jousting leave his audience laughing so hard they can barely stay seated. 'Sir Dinadan, the realist' [Elizabeth Edwards], described as the 'rational moralist' governed by a 'pragmatic creed' [Donald Hoffman], remains a central figure in Malorian analysis." Conversely, other scholars such as Eugène Vinaver and Harold Livermore view the humor of Malory's Dinadan as inferior to that found in his French source material, where Dinadan's jokes are seen as more offensive and subversive, even addressing taboo subjects like religion.

=== Tavola Ritonda ===
In La Tavola Ritonda, a late medieval Italian rewrite of the Prose Tristan, the villain Brehu/Bruce the Merciless (Breus sanz Pietà) is uniquely turned into Dinadan's cousin. Compared to the Prose Tristan, the author expanded on Dinadan's character, giving him a wider range of attitudes, some perhaps reflecting his own perceptions.

Unlike his more usual portrayals, this version of Dinadan (Dinadano) is depicted as a violent misogynist who harbors deep animosity towards women, including his dear friend Tristan's beloved, whom he openly insults as a "whore". Tristan, unsuccessfully, tries to trick him into loving a woman twice. The only time Dinadan does fall in love with a woman is during his brief affair with the evil Losanna of the Ancient Tower (Losanna della Torre Antica) in an episode based on the Short Version of the Prose Tristan. This affair causes him to turn against Tristan, who fights to save Losanna's rival Tessina (whom Dinadan also disparagingly calls a "whore"). His typically-hostile attitude towards women earns him friendly mockery from Tristan, including a comical episode where Tristan, after Dinadan refuses to marry a daughter of Espinogres (here portrayed as a king; in Malory's version he is a knight companion of Tristan and Dinadan), enters Dinadan's room at night pretending to be the daughter, madly in love with him. Late in the book, Dinadan attempts to murder the captured King Mark in revenge for the death of Tristan.

== Modern Arthuriana ==
Dinadan has appeared in a number of modern works, including as the main character in Francis Burdett Money Coutts' 1897 poem "Sir Dagonet's Quest", Ernest Rhys' 1905 poem "The Song of Dinadan and the Refrain of La Belle Isoud", Theodore Goodridge Roberts' ten short stories (an unfinished novel) collected posthoumously in The Merriest Knight (2001), and Gerald Morris' 2003 novel The Ballad of Sir Dinadan.

- He is featured in the eponymous chapter "Sir Dinadan the Humorist" in Mark Twain's 1890 novel A Connecticut Yankee in King Arthur's Court.
- In the musical Camelot, he was portrayed by John Cullum in the original 1960 Broadway production. Anthony Rogers played his role in the 1967 film adaptation.
- In Lev Grossman's 2024 novel The Bright Sword, Dinadan is portrayed as a transgender man who uses knight armor to hide his breasts and genitals, acclaimed by The New York Times reviewer (and fellow modern Arthurian author) Kiersten White as "one of the best knights to come out of modern Arthurian tales".

== See also ==
- Cross-dressing in literature
- Dagonet, the court jester of King Arthur
- Sancho Panza
