= Decoding =

Decoding or decode may refer to:

== Science and technology ==
- Decoding, the reverse of encoding
- Parsing, in computer science
- Digital-to-analog converter, "decoding" of a digital signal
- Phonics, decoding in communication theory
- Decode (Oracle)

== Music ==
- "Decode" (song), a 2008 song by US rock band Paramore
- ”Decode”, a song by Sabrina Carpenter from the 2022 album Emails I Can't Send

== Other uses ==
- deCODE genetics, a biopharmaceutical company based in Iceland
- Decoding (semiotics), the interpreting of a message communicated to a receiver
- Decode Entertainment, a former television production company that merged to form DHX Media, which later became WildBrain
- Decode, an Indian television news programme hosted by Sudhir Chaudhary on DD News
- Decode (FIRST), 2025-2026 robotics competition

== See also ==
- Code (disambiguation)
- Decoder (disambiguation)
- Decoded (disambiguation)
- Decoding methods, methods in communication theory for decoding codewords sent over a noisy channel
- Codec, a coder-decoder
- Recode (disambiguation)
- Video decoder, an electronic circuit
