= Codex (disambiguation) =

A codex is a book bound in the modern manner, by joining pages, as opposed to a rolled scroll.

Codex may also refer to:

== Arts and entertainment ==
- Codex (Warhammer 40,000), a rules supplement to the tabletop wargame
- The Codex (Sun & Storm), a 1993 supplement for the role-playing game Sun & Storm
- Codex (novel), by Lev Grossman (2005)
- The Codex (novel), by Douglas Preston (2004)
- "Codex", song by Pere Ubu from Dub Housing
- "Codex", song by Radiohead from The King of Limbs
- Codex (TV series), a UK quiz show
- Codex, a fictional character from the web series The Guild
- Codex: card-time strategy, a card game by David Sirlin (2016)

== Organizations ==
- Stanford CodeX Center, a research center at Stanford University focused on artificial intelligence and law
- Codex Corporation, a Massachusetts tech company later known as Vanguard Managed Solutions
- Codex Digital, a company that creates digital production workflow tools
- Codex, a warez group

== Science and technology ==
- WordPress Codex, a repository and manual for WordPress documentation
- OpenAI Codex (language model), a code generation large language model series
- OpenAI Codex, a software engineering AI agent
- Coronal Diagnostic Experiment, delivered to the ISS by CRS mission SpaceX CRS-31 2024

== Other uses ==
- Codex (horse) (1977–1984), American racehorse, Preakness Stakes winner

== See also ==
- List of codices
- 1983 Code of Canon Law (Codex Iuris Canonici), ecclesiastical laws for the Latin Church
- Codex Alimentarius, a collection of internationally recognized standards relating to food
- Codec (disambiguation)
- Code (law), body of law written and enforced by a sovereign state
