= Habit (album) =

Studio album by U;Nee
- Released: January 26, 2007
- Recorded: 2005–2006
- Genres: K-pop; R&B
- Length: 43:05
- Label: Fantom Entertainment

U;Nee chronology
Call Call Call (2005)	Habit (2007)

Habit (also known as 3rd Album) is the third and final studio album by South Korean singer, U;Nee. It was released posthumously on January 26, 2007, on Fantom Entertainment (팬텀엔터테인먼트)

== Background and development ==
U;Nee decided to collaborate again with the same songwriters and producers who worked on her previous album, 'Call Call Call', but this time, she made a change in her image, adopting a more mature approach and experimenting with her voice, also drawing inspiration from the sound of her first album.

Initially, the album's title track was intended to be 'Honey.' Still, after recording '솔로판타지' (Solo Fantasy),' the agency decided to make it the title track of the album, although it was later changed definitely to '습관' (Habit). Despite this change, it is speculated that both songs would be promoted, as they both had choreographies prepared for their release. However, due to the tragic loss of U;Nee, only the song '습관' (Habit) was promoted.

The sound of the album is different from her previous work 'Call Call Call'. The song '솔로판타지' (Solo Fantasy)' is reminiscent of her debut track, 'Go' (가), thanks to its intense choreography and rap elements. On the other hand, '내 맘속의 빈자리' (Empty Spot In My Heart) is a captivating R&B song written by U;Nee and the song 'Follow Me' which was previously released in Japan along with her debut single 'One' there.

Meanwhile, the album includes an emotional ballad titled '습관' (Habit), which was produced and written by Jung Sung-Yoon (정성윤), a composer who didn't work on her last album. This song would eventually be the album's title track.

In 2006, U;Nee announced through her website that her third album would be released approximately in the middle of the year. However, due to her promotional commitments in Japan, the album's release was finally postponed to the following year, in 2007.

The album photos and album cover were taken in Japan during the summer of 2006. Some of these photos were revealed on her website before the release. However, the images did not fit well with the album's track listing. Therefore, the decision was made to darken them to give them a more somber tone in keeping with the overall mood of the album.

== Cancelled music video and album release ==
On January 21, 2007, a day before the music video for the album's title track, '솔로판타지' (Solo Fantasy), U;Nee was found lifeless in her home by her grandmother. Her death was the result of suicide due to the depression she was facing. In a gesture of respect to her memory, U;Nee's agency, Fantom Entertainment, initially decided to cancel the album release, originally scheduled for February 1 .However, the album was finally released at the family's request on January 26, 2007.

Following the tragic loss of U;Nee, the album's title track was changed to '습관' (Habit), the only ballad on the album. A music video that paid tribute to the highlights of U;Nee's career was released.

In addition, an emotional video of U;Nee dancing to the choreography of her song '솔로판타지' (Solo Fantasy) was revealed. This video was recorded on January 19, just two days before her death.

Currently, the rights to the album are held by RIAK.

All the money made from the album went to U;Nee's family

== Track listing ==
No.	Title	Writer(s)	Producer(s)	Length
1.	"Intro"		조성진	0:59
2.	"U-Turn (Rock Ver.)"	조진광	최수영	3:26
3.	"Honey"	강우경	박성호	3:52
4.	"솔로판타지 (Solo Fantasy)"	박장근, 박남훈	조성진	3:31
5.	"습관 (Habit) (Acoustic Ver.)"	정성윤	정성윤	4:47
6.	"내 맘속의 빈자리 (Empty Spot In My Heart)"	U;Nee	최수영	3:33
7.	"Follow Me"	U;Nee	이한범	4:47
8.	"Run Away"	강우경	박성호	3:41
9.	"아버지 (Father) (Remix)"	조진광	최수영, 이한범	3:26
10.	"U-Turn (House Ver.)"	조진광	최수영	3:40
11.	"Habits (Ver. 2)"	조진광	최수영	4:47
12.	"라스트 크리스마스 1397 (Last Christmas 1397) (Outro)"		조성진	2:32
Total length:				43:05

== Promoted songs ==
"습관 (Acoustic Ver.)"
