= Stacy Mehrfar =

- Born: Stacy Arezou Mehrfar
- Occupation: Contemporary artist
- Website: stacymehrfar.com

Stacy Arezou Mehrfar is an Iranian-American contemporary artist whose practice spans photography, video, and artist books.

Mehrfar has received several awards, including a Puffin Foundation Artist Grant (2022), Joseph Robert Foundation Artist Grant (2022), and an Australian Postgraduate Award (2014).

== Early life and education ==
Stacy Arezou Mehrfar is a first-generation Iranian-American born and raised in Port Washington, New York on Long Island. She earned a BFA from the University of Wisconsin–Madison. From 2008 to 2016, she lived in Sydney, Australia, where she earned an MFA from the University of New South Wales, School of Art and Design, formerly the College of Fine Arts.

== Work ==
=== The Moon Belongs to Everyone ===
The Moon Belongs to Everyone is a multi-format work comprising over 70 photographs presented as print installations, eight-channel video installations and a published photobook. The work is structured as a multi-layered visual narrative set in a non-specific landscape, exploring the loss of cultural roots and the search for belonging in the context of migration. Published in March 2021 by GOST Books, the now out-of-print photobook presents over 57 photographs the artist made in Australia and New York.

=== A Collective Performance ===
A Collective Performance is a five-channel stop motion video created from more than 4,500 photographs taken at political demonstrations in New York City between 2017 and 2018, including the Women's March, the Rally Against Trump's Muslim Ban, and the March for Science. Using time-lapse sequencing, the project explores themes of collective action, social cohesion, and temporary community through images of protesters, police, journalists, and bystanders.

=== Tall Poppy Syndrome ===
Mehrfar's Tall Poppy Syndrome was a collaborative photographic project and artist book created with photographer Amy Stein. Developed in 2010 following a month-long road trip through New South Wales, Australia, the work examines the cultural phenomenon of “tall poppy syndrome,“ in which individuals perceived as overly successful or exceptional are criticized or socially “cut down.” Published in 2012 by Decode Books, the work combined portraiture, landscape photography, and social observation. The project was later exhibited internationally, including at ClampArt in New York and the Edmund Pearce Gallery in Melbourne.

=== Down in the Forest, We Sing a Chorus ===
Mehrfar's Down in the Forest, We Sing a Chorus is a photographic series, created between 2020 and 2021 during the COVID-19 pandemic. Produced in upstate New York, the series consists of black-and-white photographs of forests, bodies, and natural forms that examine themes of interconnection, transformation, and fragility. The work draws connections between the natural world and human experience.

== Selected exhibitions ==
=== Solo ===
- 2025: The Moon Belongs to Everyone, Les Champs Libres, Glaz Festival, Rennes, France
- 2023: Borderlines (with Stacy Kranitz), KMAC Museum, Louisville, KY
- 2023: The Moon Belongs to Everyone, Filter Space, Chicago, IL
- 2019: A Collective Performance, SVA Theatre: Art & Activism, New York
- 2018: A Collective Performance, TEDxSydney, Sydney, Australia
- 2014: Tall Poppy Syndrome, Wallflower Gallery, Mildura, NSW, Australia
- 2013: Tall Poppy Syndrome, ClampArt, New York

=== Group ===
- 2026: Reservoir: Photography, Loneliness, and Well Being, Los Angeles Center of Photography, Los Angeles
- 2026: Primeval Ground [Deep, Unfathomable], Westbeth Gallery, New York
- 2025: 20 on 20: A Lens of Her Own, ANU Museum, Tel Aviv, Israel
- 2024: Beyond the Mirror, L’Space Gallery, New York
- 2020: Darkness Before Dawn, Ethan Cohen KuBe, Beacon, New York
- 2017: 100 Days, ICP Museum, New York
