= The Magician's Land =

2014 novel by Lev Grossman

- First edition
- Author: Lev Grossman
- Language: English
- Series: The Magicians trilogy
- Genre: Low fantasy, Parallel universe
- Publisher: Viking
- Publication date: 2014
- Publication place: United States
- Media type: Print
- Pages: 416 pp (first edition)
- ISBN: 978-0-670-01567-2
- LC Class: PS3557.R6725 M28
- Preceded by: The Magician King

The Magician's Land is a contemporary fantasy novel by Lev Grossman, published in 2014 by Viking Adult, the sequel to The Magicians (2009) and The Magician King (2011) and the conclusion of The Magicians trilogy. It continues the story of outcast magician Quentin Coldwater, interweaving it with the story of several of his friends who are questing to save the magical realm of Fillory.

== Plot summary ==
After being expelled from the magical realm of Fillory, magician Quentin Coldwater returns to his alma mater, the magical college of Brakebills, as a new professor. There he is finally given a discipline, the repair of small objects (minor mendings), and spends his spare time studying an ancient spell found in his travels through the Neitherlands, the magical space between worlds. Near the end of his first semester, he rescues a student, Plum, after a magical prank gone wrong, revealing to Quentin that Alice, now a niffin (a malicious spirit of pure magic), is still alive. The school's dean expels Plum for the prank and fires Quentin for failing to follow protocol in his rescue attempt.

Needing money, Quentin and Plum independently join a gang of magician thieves led by a talking bird intent on stealing a mysterious suitcase. They are interrupted during the heist by a competing group of thieves with translucent golden hands; a battle and chase ensue, and the survivors disband. The suitcase contains an old book and a blade capable of killing a god, and one of the gang reveals she is Asmodeus when she takes the blade to kill Reynard the Fox; Quentin and Plum take the book. Written to tell his side of the story before he dies in the second world war, the book is Rupert Chatwin's memoir and tells the story of how his family discovered and inhabited Fillory and then of how he accompanied Martin as he sells his humanity to Umber to be able to stay in Fillory.

In Fillory, Eliot and Janet learn from Ember, the ram god, that the magical realm is dying. After Eliot leaves for Earth, Janet, Josh, and Poppy continue searching for answers in a hidden castle (after receiving a clue from Rupert's book sent by Eliot) where they find Umber, confronting him just as an apocalypse begins.

In New York, Quentin and Plum use a spell tucked into Rupert's book to create a new magical land, but, missing an ingredient, the spell goes wrong and creates an eerie mirror image of their house in which Alice is trapped. Eliot arrives from Fillory to share the news of that realm's demise while Quentin uses the spell from the Neitherlands to restore Alice to her human form. Initially furious at being reincorporated, she tells Quentin, Eliot, and Plum of her travels, which included going back in time to the dawn of Fillory when a tigress goddess sacrificed herself to give life to Ember, Umber, and eventually Fillory itself. The talking bird arrives, desperate for help, and reveals he was sent by Ember; Quentin throws him out, and slowly begins to reconcile with Alice.

Quentin, Plum, Eliot, and Alice travel to the Neitherlands, where they encounter their former classmate Penny, now a powerful librarian with new, translucent golden hands that some of his subordinates have emulated. They meet Janet, Josh, and Poppy escaping the end of Fillory, but Quentin and Alice refuse to give up, travelling back to the dying world. There, Quentin, mimicking the beginning of Fillory, sacrifices Ember and Umber to assume their power and rebuild the world. When the job is finished, he relinquishes the divine power and Julia, now a demigoddess and queen of the dryads, rewards him with a brief tour of the Far Side of Fillory, where he is given a seed pod from the Drowned Garden and informed that Asmodeus was successful in killing Reynard.

Eliot, Janet, Josh, and Poppy return to Fillory as its rulers and Plum joins them to find her own adventures. Quentin returns with Alice to New York and attempts the spell to create a magical realm again, this time with the seed pod. He succeeds, and he and Alice head into the land to explore. To Quentin's surprise, they encounter the "cozy horse" a large horse made of cloth that was described in the Fillory and Further book series. After getting on the horse, Quentin and Alice discover that their new world is connected to Fillory.

== Reception ==
The Magician's Land received positive reviews. The review by The A.V. Club gave the novel an A−, saying that it "manages to be a satisfying finale to the series, while adding depth and shading to the world—magical and otherwise—of the earlier books." The New York Times called it a "richly imagined and continually surprising novel", and said that it "is the strongest book in Grossman's series. It not only offers a satisfying conclusion to Quentin Coldwater's quests, earthly and otherwise, but also considers complex questions about identity and selfhood as profound as they are entertaining."

Writing in Strange Horizons, A. S. Moser praised the novel as a conclusion to the trilogy, saying "Grossman displays an admirably Dickensian mastery of plot threads" and that "[d]espite a looser, more picaresque plot structure, this may be the best book of the trilogy."
