= Legal instrument =

Type of legal document

Legal instrument is a legal term of art that is used for any formally executed written document that can be formally attributed to its author, records and formally expresses a legally enforceable act, process, or contractual duty, obligation, or right, and therefore evidences that act, process, or agreement. Examples include a certificate, deed, bond, contract, will, legislative act, notarial act, court writ or process, or any law passed by a competent legislative body in domestic or international law.Many legal instruments were written under seal by affixing a wax or paper seal to the document in evidence of its legal execution and authenticity (which often removed the need for consideration in contract law). However, today, many jurisdictions have abolished the requirement for documents to be under seal in order for them to have legal effect.

== Electronic legal documents ==
With the onset of the Internet and electronic equipment such as the personal computers and cell-phones, legal instruments or formal legal documents have undergone a progressive change of dematerialisation. In this electronic age, document authentication can now be verified digitally using various software. All documents needing authentication can be processed as digital documents with all the necessary information such as date and time stamp imbedded. To prevent tampering or unauthorized changes to the original document, encryption is used. In modern times, authentication is no longer limited to the type of paper used, the specialized seal, stamps, etc., as document authentication software helps secure the original context. The use of electronic legal documents is most prominent in the United States' courts. Most American courts prefer the filing of electronic legal documents over paper. However, there is not yet a public law to unify the different standards of document authentication. Therefore, one must know the court's requirement before filing court papers.

To address part of this concern, the United States Congress enacted the Electronic Signatures in Global and National Commerce Act in 2000 (P.L. 106-229 of 2000, 15 USCS sec. 7001) specifying that no court could thereafter fail to recognize a contract simply because it was digitally signed. The law is very permissive, making essentially any electronic character in a contract sufficient. It is also quite restrictive in that it does not force the recognition of some document types in electronic form, no matter what the electronic character might be. No restriction is made to signatures which are adequately cryptographically tied to both the document text (see message digest) and to a particular key whose use should be restricted to certain persons (e.g., the alleged sender). There is thus a gap between what the cryptographic engineering can provide and what the law assumes is both possible and meaningful.

Several states had already enacted laws on the subject of electronic legal documents and signatures before the U.S. Congress had acted, including Utah, Washington, and California to name only a few of the earliest. They vary considerably in intent, coverage, cryptographic understanding, and effect.

Several other nations and international bodies have also enacted statutes and regulations regarding the validity and binding nature of digital signatures.

To date, the variety (and inadequacy) of the definitions used for digital signatures (or electronic signatures) have produced a legal and contractual minefield for those who may be considering relying on the legality and enforceability of digitally signed contracts in any of many jurisdictions. Adequate legislation adequately informed by cryptographic engineering technology remains an elusive goal. That it has been fully, or adequately, achieved (in any jurisdiction) is a claim which must be taken with considerable caution.

== See also ==
- Legal coding
- Legal document assistant
