= The Magicians trilogy =

Trilogy of fantasy novels

- Author: Lev Grossman
- Language: English
- Genre: Contemporary fantasy; Low fantasy; Parallel universe
- Publisher: Viking; Penguin Books
- Published: 2009–2014
- No. of books: 3

The Magicians trilogy is the common name for a series of fantasy novels written by Lev Grossman, consisting of The Magicians (2009), The Magician King (2011), and The Magician's Land (2014). The novels are contemporary fantasy and follow a group of young magicians as they are admitted to a college for magic and then navigate their young adulthood. The trilogy was adapted for television and ran for 5 seasons on Syfy; it was also adapted as a comic book.

== Publication history ==
Grossman's The Magicians was published in hardcover in August 2009 and became a bestseller. The trade paperback edition was made available on May 25, 2010. The Washington Post called it "Exuberant and inventive...Fresh and compelling...a great fairy tale." Michael Agger of The New York Times said the book "could crudely be labeled a Harry Potter for adults," injecting mature themes into fantasy literature. The Magicians won the 2010 Alex Award, given to ten adult books that are appealing to young adults, and the 2011 John W. Campbell Award for Best New Writer.

In August 2011, The Magician King, the sequel to The Magicians, was published, which returns readers to the magical land of Fillory, where Quentin and his friends are now kings and queens. The Chicago Tribune said "The Magician King was The Catcher in the Rye for devotees of alternative universes" and that "Grossman has created a rare, strange and scintillating novel." It was an Editor's Choice pick of The New York Times, who called it "[A] serious, heartfelt novel [that] turns the machinery of fantasy inside out." The Boston Globe said "The Magician King is a rare achievement, a book that simultaneously criticizes and celebrates our deep desire for fantasy."

The third book in the series is titled The Magician's Land and was published on August 5, 2014.

== Reception of the trilogy ==
Both as individual books and as a trilogy, the series received positive reviews. Writing in Slate, Choire Sicha said "When read straight through, the Magicians trilogy reveals its lovely shape. The world of the books wraps around itself, exposing most everything necessary by its conclusion, but occluding operations that we’ll never need to see...Things you will definitely have forgotten were meaningful—emotionally—turn out to be important, and addressed, and redressed."

Writing in Strange Horizons, A. S. Moser said "Beyond the wonder mediated by realism and the sense of the sublime tempered by pain, the real success of this trilogy is that in the all too unmagical inner conflicts the characters face we recognize ourselves—conflicts which the element of magic allows Grossman to set at just enough of a distance for us to feel their truth without suffering their memory."

== Adaptations ==
=== Television ===
In 2011, Fox optioned but eventually declined to order a television adaptation of The Magicians. In July 2014, Syfy greenlit the production of a pilot episode, and ordered a 12-episode first season which aired in January 2016. The series eventually ran for 5 seasons and 65 episodes, ending in 2020.

The Syfy series was written by John McNamara and Sera Gamble, and produced by Michael London and Janice Williams. The pilot episode was directed by Mike Cahill, and the cast includes Jason Ralph as Quentin, Olivia Taylor Dudley as Alice, Hale Appleman as Eliot, Summer Bishil as Margo Hanson (renamed from Janet in the novel), Arjun Gupta as Penny, Stella Maeve as Julia, and Rick Worthy as Henry Fogg.

The series ages the characters up to graduate school students and compresses the Brakebills degree to three years. Most of the events detailed in the novel, the Antarctic trip for instance, appear to happen in Quentin's first year at Brakebills with years in the novel being roughly condensed into semesters in the TV show. Jane Chatwin is involved earlier and more heavily, and Quentin is more formally diagnosed with depression.

=== Comic books ===
Grossman contributed to two comic book adaptations written by Lilah Sturges in 2019, published by Boom! Studios. The Magicians: Alice's Story is a graphic novel adaptation of The Magicians told from Alice's perspective. The comic expands on parts of Alice's life mentioned in the novel and gives more insights into her actions at the end of the first novel and beyond. The Magicians: The New Class was an ongoing series following a new cohort of students at Brakebills after the events of the trilogy, including hedge mages that had been recruited by new means.

== Main characters ==
=== Brakebills students ===
- Quentin Makepeace Coldwater is the primary protagonist of the trilogy. At the start of The Magicians, he is 17, obsessed with a series of children's books called "Fillory and Further", and depressed. He interviews for and is accepted into Brakebills College for Magical Pedagogy to study magic; after his graduation, he discovers that the realm of Fillory is real and travels with his friends between worlds. Quentin completes quests, serves as king of Fillory, and helps save magic in the multiverse. In The Magician's Land, he works as a professor at Brakebills until a prank by Plum, a fifth-year student, goes wrong and he is fired, after which he participates in a magical heist, creates a new realm, and saves Fillory, now dying. In the books, Quentin has a heterosexual relationship with Alice Quinn while in the TV adaption, he is bisexual, having relationships with both Alice and Eliot Waugh. His discipline is Minor Mending. In an interview, Grossman described Quentin at the start of the trilogy as being a lot like he was as a teenager and "at the very end of the books gets to somewhere around where I'm trying to be".
- Alice Quinn is a secondary protagonist of the series and one of the point of view characters of The Magician's Land. She is a classmate, friend, and lover of Quentin's and a talented magician. The child of two magicians, she had an older brother who died when he was transformed into a niffin, a spirit of pure magic, by a spell that got out of control. At first, she is painfully shy, and is "deep in a trance of unworthiness", but she is able to pull herself out of it. She transforms herself into a niffin to be able to save her friends; as a niffin, she explores Fillory, travelling in time back to its beginning, before making her way back to Earth and to Brakebills. Quentin is able to transform her back into a human, after which she helps him in saving the dying land of Fillory and in creating a new realm. Her discipline is Phosphoromancy.
- Eliot Waugh is a secondary protagonist and one of the point of view characters of The Magician's Land. He is a friend of Quentin's who becomes the High King of Fillory. He comes from Oregon, where he was bullied for his sexuality. Two years older than Quentin, Eliot welcomes him when he takes his entrance exam. Eliot is described by Quentin as "conspicuously brilliant" despite never seeming to study. He takes great care in his appearance, is a heavy drinker with an appreciation for fine wines, and cigarettes. He travels to Fillory with Quentin, and then becomes its High King, where he is able to develop into a mature and caring individual. In an interview, Grossman stated that Eliot was based on several people, including a college roommate that he looked up to.
- Janet Way or Pluchinsky (Note: She is called "Janet Way" by another student in the first book, but "Janet Pluchinsky" by Dean Fogg in the second.) is a secondary protagonist and one of the point of view characters of The Magician's Land. Originally from California, she is peer of Eliot and Josh, was in the Physical magic group. She is outspoken and sometimes unkind, but fiercely loyal. She travels with the others to Fillory, where she becomes High Queen. During Eliot's absence, she tours the lands and writes a constitution. Her discipline involves cold magic, and in the third book she has a pair of ice axes she calls her "Sorrows." In an interview, Grossman describes her as being free with her anger in a way he wishes he could be and notes that she says the sorts of things he would want to. Grossman has also noted that the discrepancy in her names is due to "operator error", in that he had forgotten that he'd revealed her last name and inadvertently renamed her.
- Josh Hoberman is a peer of Eliot and Janet and later King of Fillory. He is the overweight comic relief of the Physical Magic group; an incredibly strong but inconsistent magician, he barely graduates from Brakebills. After travelling to Fillory with the others, he uses one of the "buttons" that allows users to travel between worlds to explore the multiverse, before he sells the button to the dragon in the Grand Canal and uses the money to buy himself a mansion and set himself up as an intermediary between self-trained "hedge witches" and classically trained magicians. He accidentally returns to Fillory with Quentin and Julia, and ends up becoming King of Fillory and marrying the Australian magician Poppy, with whom he has a child.
- Penny is a peer of Quentin's and later the Librarian of the Neitherlands, the city between worlds. It is revealed that his first name is William and his middle name is Schroeder, but no last name is given. He is examined for Brakebills on the same day as Quentin, and his Discipline involves travel between worlds. After leading the others to Fillory and a fight with the Beast, in which his hands are bitten off, he chooses to stay in the Neitherlands. During the fight with the Old Gods, he proves himself capable, and losses in personnel mean that he is promoted to be Librarian of the order that runs the Neitherlands. He has spectral prostheses for his hands, which have a number of extra capabilities. In an interview, Grossman described him as a "suburban ... punk wannabe" who grew up in an upper-middle class home; he has a sheltered life in a Southern California Gated community and "tries to cobble together a personality by pretending he doesn't". Grossman describes him as very close in personality to Quentin, "just not in the ways that would make them like each other".
- Plum Polson Purchas is a secondary protagonist and a point-of-view character in The Magician's Land. The child of a magician and the great-granddaughter of Rupert Chatwin, she is a student at Brakebills and is responsible for the prank that leads to Quentin's dismissal as professor. She is involved in a magical heist and becomes Quentin's research assistant and helps build a new realm. Her discipline involves illusions.

=== Hedge witches ===
- Julia Wicker is a secondary protagonist and one of two point-of-view characters in The Magician King. She is childhood friend of Quentin's; following an unsuccessful interview for Brakebills on the same day as Quentin, she works to learn magic herself from other online searches, amateur self-taught magicians (nicknamed "hedge witches") and secret clubs. Following an accidental summoning of Reynard, the trickster god, in which she is raped and has her humanity taken, she finds Eliot and Janet and travels with them and Quentin to become a Queen of the magical realm of Fillory. During a quest to restore magic to Fillory, the goddess she had intended to summon makes her a dryad, and she becomes a demigod, after which she goes to look after the other side of Fillory. She later appears in The Magician’s Land, in which she serves as leader of the dryads and characterizes herself as ‘more of a three-quarters god,’ commenting that there should be a word for that. Grossman has stated that Julia is very like what he was like in his twenties, when he "really got lost in the way that she does", and in writings about his own struggles with depression has used similar phrasing to the way he describes her.
- Asmodeus is a friend of Julia. In The Magician King, she is approximately 17, with a mysterious past and a brilliant mind for theoretical physics. She and Julia are the only ones of the Murs magicians to survive. In The Magician's Land, she goes by the name of Betsy, and is involved in the heist. At the disastrous end of the heist she acquires a very old knife that she tells the surviving heist members is a weapon for killing gods. Before she takes off she reveals her real name and says ”The name’s Asmodeus, bitches, and if you see Julia, tell her I’ve gone fox hunting”. Later, near the end of the book Julia, now the queen of the dryads, admits to Plum and Quentin that she helped Asmodeus behind the scenes and confirms that she killed the trickster god Reynard. Quentin believes that she despite being a ”three quarters goddess” enjoyed the well deserved revenge.

=== The Chatwins ===
The Chatwins are a family of five siblings who travel to Fillory while being sent away to the country; their descriptions of these travels to Christopher Plover form the basis of the "Fillory and Further" novels. They are listed in order of age.

- Martin Chatwin, also known as the Beast, is the eldest sibling and first to travel to Fillory. He features in "The World in the Walls" and appears at the end of "The Flying Forest". Christopher Plover sexually abuses him, and he becomes disillusioned with the real world. He is able to sneak back in to Fillory through a route intended for Rupert, and he gives his humanity to Umber to be able to remain in Fillory forever. He becomes the Beast, rules Fillory as a tyrant, and is killed by Alice at the climax of the first book.
- Fiona Chatwin features in "The World in the Walls" and "The Flying Forest", and later has children who inherit the house in Cornwall. In her later life, she would pretend she'd never heard of Fillory.
- Rupert Chatwin is the author of "The Door in the Page" and the great-grandfather of Plum Purchas. He features in "The Girl Who Told Time", "The Flying Forest", and "The Secret Sea". He witnessed Martin giving his humanity to Umber in Castle Blackspire, after which he stole a spell and a knife capable of killing gods. He left the spell, the knife, and a memoir called "The Door in the Page" in a briefcase that could only be opened by one of his descendants, before dying in Africa in World War II; this memoir is included in The Magician's Land.
- Helen Chatwin features in "The Girl Who Told Time" and "The Wandering Dune". She is described as pious, worshipping Ember and Umber and deferring to Their judgement. After she and Jane receive magic buttons that would allow them to travel to Fillory at will, she hides them in a well. Later, she changes her name, becomes an Evangelical Christian, and moves to Texas.
- Jane Chatwin, also known as the Watcherwoman, is the author of "The Magicians," intended to be the sixth "Fillory and Further" book. She features in "The Wandering Dune" and "The Secret Sea". After she finds the magic buttons again at around age 13, she returns to Fillory to be told Martin has become the Beast and that Umber has been killed. She holds a war council with Ember. The dwarves give her a watch that allows her to travel in time, and she attempts many different scenarios until Quentin and his friends are finally able to kill the Beast, after which she destroys the watch. Following this, she ages rapidly. Posing as a paramedic, she is responsible for giving Quentin the note that leads him to his Brakebills entrance exam.

=== Fillorians ===
- Ember and Umber, also known as the Great Rams, are the dual ram gods of Fillory, somewhat analogous to Aslan in their role. Each is significantly larger than a normal ram, with large, curled horns. Ember is golden, and has a resonant baritone voice, whereas Umber is dark grey, also known as the Shadow Ram, and has a higher, tenor voice. In the "Fillory and Further" books, they generally gave the Chatwin children a quest at the beginning, and then returned at the end to send them home again. In The Magicians, Ember has been trapped by the Beast, and Umber is presumed dead. It later emerges that the Beast was created when Martin Chatwin gave his humanity to Umber, who wanted to be a King as well as a god.
