= Code (disambiguation) =

A code is a rule for converting a piece of information into another object or action, not necessarily of the same sort.

Code may also refer to:

== Computing ==
- Code (metadata), data elements whose allowable values can be represented as enumerated lists
- Code point, a numerical value used in character encoding
- Code.org, a non-profit organization and website that encourages U.S. school students to learn computer science
- Coding theory, branch of mathematics and computer science dealing with data transmission
- Executable code
- Machine code, a sequence of instructions to a processor unit
- Source code, a sequence of instructions written in some human-readable computer programming language
- Bytecode, a sequence of instructions interpreted by software
- <code></code>, an HTML element
- Visual Studio Code, an integrated development environment app also known as "Code" for short

== Science and technology ==
- Code (coding theory), a subset of cardinality at least two of a Hamming space
- Code (cryptography), device for hiding the meaning of a message
- Code (semiotics), device to carry information in a verbal and/or nonverbal form
- Code (set theory), set with a particular isomorphism to another set
- Barcode, an optical, machine-readable representation of a numeric code that identifies the object to which it is attached
- Baudot code, used in telegraphy
- Diagnosis code, used to translate medical conditions into statistical codes, also used for the purpose of health care planning and reimbursement
- Encoding (memory), storage and recalling of information by organisms
- Genetic code, a correspondence between the structures of messenger RNA and proteins
- Hospital emergency codes, used in hospitals worldwide to alert staff to various emergencies
- ID code, an encoded identifier
- Morse code, a method with which humans can transmit letters using only short and long pulses
- Nomenclature codes, rulebooks of scientific naming convention
- Serial code or serial number

== Society and law ==
- Code (law), body of law written and enforced by a sovereign state
  - Legal code (municipal), a body of law written by a regional or local governmental entity
- Building code, set of rules that specify the minimum standards for constructed objects
- Code name, a word or name used to refer to another name, word, project or person
- Ethical code, adopted by a profession, by a governmental or quasi-governmental organ, or by a trade group or other organization
- Code Parish in Latvia

== Arts, entertainment, and media ==
=== Films ===
- The Code (2001 film), 2001 Linux documentary
- The Code (2002 film), French film
- Thick as Thieves (2009 film) or The Code, 2009 heist film

=== Literature ===
- Code (novel), 2013, by Kathy Reichs
- Code: The Hidden Language of Computer Hardware and Software, a 1999 book by Charles Petzold
- Code and Other Laws of Cyberspace, a 1999 book by Lawrence Lessig
  - Code: Version 2.0, a 2006 update to Lessig's 1999 book
- The Code (novel), in the Nick Carter-Killmaster series

=== Music ===
- Code (band), English black metal band
- Codes (band), Irish indie electronic band
- The Code (band), ska punk band
- Code (album), 1987, by Cabaret Voltaire
- The Code (album), 2016, by Young Noble & Deuce Deuce, or the title song
- The Code (EP), by Monsta X
- U;Nee Code or Code, the 2003 debut album by Korean pop singer U;Nee
- "The Code" (King Von song), 2020
- "Code" (song), 2022, by Offset and Moneybagg Yo
- "The Code" (Nemo song), 2024, by Nemo
- "Code", a 2001 song by Faithless from the album Outrospective

=== Television ===
- The Code (Australian TV series), a 2014–2016 Australian political drama
- The Code (British TV programme), a 2011 British mathematics documentary series from BBC2
- The Code (American TV series), a 2019 American military legal drama
- The Code (game show), British game show
- "The Code" (The Amazing World of Gumball), a 2016 episode
- "The Code" (Fear the Walking Dead), a 2018 episode
- "The Code" (Forever Knight), a 1995 episode
- "The Code" (Smart Guy), a 1997 episode
- The Code: Crime and Justice, a 2007 Australian legal documentary program
- Code: Secret Room, 2016 South Korean TV series

=== Video games ===
- Code (video game), a puzzle video game
- Konami Code, a cheat code which appears in mainly Konami video games

=== Other uses in arts, entertainment, and media ===
- Code (audio standard), or ΧΟΔΕ, high-fidelity audio disc brand developed by T-Bone Burnett
- Motion Picture Production Code or Hays Code, the voluntary US films censorship guidelines from 1930 to 1968

== Sports and hobbies ==
- Code, any one of the distinct games known as football
- Code, a unit of scale in model railroading
- Rugby codes, distinguishing between rugby league and rugby union

== See also ==
- CODE (disambiguation)
- Code mixing
- Code of conduct
- Code-switching (disambiguation)
- Code talker
- Codebook (disambiguation)
- Codec (disambiguation)
- Codex (disambiguation)
- Coding (disambiguation)
- Kode (disambiguation)
- Product code (disambiguation)
- Recode (disambiguation)
