= Kode (disambiguation) =

Kode is a Swedish locality.

Kode or KODE may also refer to:

- KODE-TV, the ABC affiliate for Joplin, Missouri/Pittsburg, Kansas
- Kodè, an arrondissement in the Ouémé department of Benin
- Kode, the ancient Egyptian name for Kizzuwatna, an Anatolian kingdom
- P. D. Kode (born 1953), Indian judge

== See also ==
- Code (disambiguation)
- Kodes (disambiguation)
