= Decoded =

Decoded may refer to:

- Decoded (memoir), autobiography of rapper Jay-Z
- Brad Meltzer's Decoded, 2010–12 American TV series
- Decoded (novel), 2002 Chinese novel by Mai Jia
  - Decoded (Chinese TV series), 2016 TV series based on the novel
  - Decoded (film), 2024 film based on the novel

== See also ==
- Decoder (disambiguation)
- Decoding (disambiguation)
- Code (disambiguation)
