= Codemaster =

Codemaster or code master may refer to:

- Code master or master coder, a master programmer
- Cipher master or secret code master, a master cryptographer
- Codemaster, a character class in Chaotic (TV series)
- Codemasters, a British video game developer

== See also ==
- Code (disambiguation)
- Master (disambiguation)
