= Coding efficiency =

Coding efficiency may refer to:

== In computing ==
- Data compression efficiency
- Algorithmic efficiency

== In biology ==
- Efficient coding hypothesis

== See also ==
- Efficiency (disambiguation)
- Coding (disambiguation)
