= LSPI =

LSPI may refer to:

- Low-Speed Pre-Ignition, a pre-ignition event that occurs in gasoline vehicle engines
- LiquidPower Specialty Products Inc., a Berkshire Hathaway company
