= United States Oil & Gas Association =

The United States Oil & Gas Association, formerly the Mid-Continent Oil & Gas Association, is a trade association which promotes the well-being of the oil and natural gas industries in the United States. Primarily, the organization focuses on the production of these resources. Other organizations exist to deal with concerns of transportation, refining and processing, and other discrete functions of the fossil fuel industry.

== Early history ==
The predecessor organization, Mid-Continent Oil & Gas Association, was founded on October 13, 1917, after the United States entered World War I, in Tulsa, Oklahoma, which called itself "The Oil Capital of the World". At its creation, the association worked to provide petroleum to the Allied forces.

== State-level affiliates ==
As of June 2018, Bloomberg, LP, lists Mid-Continent Oil and Gas Association of Oklahoma, Inc. located at 6701 North Broadway, Suite 300 Oklahoma City, OK 73116, and states that its business is to, "... support legislation for the energy industry at the Oklahoma State Capitol and to provide education programs and seminars.

The Texas association was also established in 1923 and renamed the Texas Oil & Gas Association in 1997.

== See also ==
- American Petroleum Institute
