= The Bright Sword =

2024 fantasy novel by Lev Grossman

- The cover of The Bright Sword
- Author: Lev Grossman
- Language: English
- Genre: Fantasy; Arthurian legend; Historical fiction
- Publisher: Viking Press; Penguin Random House
- Publication date: 16 July 2024
- Media type: Print
- Pages: 688 pp (first edition)
- ISBN: 978-0-7352-2404-9
- OCLC: 1404059383
- LC Class: PS3557.R6725B75 2024

The Bright Sword is a fantasy novel written by American author Lev Grossman, published in 2024 by Viking Press. The novel takes place within the King Arthur mythology, and follows a talented young knight named Collum who travels from his backwater home to Camelot, expecting to meet King Arthur and join the Round Table. Collum finds that Arthur and most of the knights of the Round Table died weeks before Collum arrived, in the battle against Mordred, leaving only a handful of leaderless knights to defend Camelot and the throne of Britain from competing warlords, rivals, and the magical forces of Morgan le Fay.

Grossman wrote the novel over a period of ten years, explaining in a blog post that the book was a personal and challenging project, owing to the difficulty of historical research, vulnerable themes, and writing during the COVID-19 pandemic. Grossman stated in an interview that he was drawn to the idea of writing a classic Arthurian legend, but discarding the most famous heroes like Gawain or Galahad and instead placing traditionally minor characters at the center stage.

== Plot ==
The novel follows Collum, a young knight from the Isle of Mull seeking to join King Arthur and the Knights of the Round Table at Camelot. Collum is an orphan and bastard, who stole a set of armor from his abusive guardian Lord Alaisdar and ran away from Mull towards Camelot. During his journey, he encounters a mysterious knight bearing a white-painted shield to conceal his identity. After defeating the knight in combat, Collum initially spares him but is ultimately forced to kill him in self-defense when the anonymous knight refuses to yield.

Upon reaching Camelot, Collum discovers the Round Table in disarray following King Arthur's death in battle weeks earlier. The remaining knights are not the celebrated heroes of legend, but rather the overlooked members: Sir Bedivere, who secretly harbored romantic feelings for Arthur; Sir Palomides, a Muslim knight from Baghdad; Sir Dinadan, a trans man who conceals his sex; Sir Dagonet, Arthur's former jester who was knighted as a joke; and Sir Scipio, a Roman legionary who entered a century-long magical sleep after fighting to spread Roman culture to Britain. They are aided by Nimue, Merlin's apprentice who rebelled against her master and trapped him under a hill.

At Collum's insistence, the knights request a magical sign to begin a quest, following Arthur's tradition. Their request summons the Green Knight through a portal in the great hall. Collum fights and disarms the Green Knight, gaining some respect from the knights, who agree to take him into their party. The knights embark on a series of adventures, with flashbacks revealing each knight's history and providing context for Arthur's rise to power and reign. Their journey takes them into the magical Otherworld, where they encounter Morgan le Fey and her fairy army. Morgan plans to conquer Britain, expel Christianity, and restore the ancient magical order that existed before Roman occupation.

During the quest, Collum learns he is the son of Sir Bleoberys—the same mysterious knight he killed on his way to Camelot. Upon returning to Camelot, they find Lancelot, who had fled before Arthur's death, has claimed the throne. Collum dives to the bottom of the North Sea and meets the Lady of the Lake, who despite her anger towards Arthur, allows him to take Excalibur. With his new sword, Collum defeats Lancelot in combat and pledges his loyalty to Guinevere, Arthur's wife, who becomes queen.

The story concludes with Morgan revealing a vision of approaching Saxon and Germanic peoples on Britain's eastern shores. She explains that despite previous victories against Saxon invasions, their eventual reshaping of Britain is inevitable, with Arthur's descendants being pushed into Wales—just another of Britain's many transformations.

== Background ==
=== The Arthurian Legend, or The Matter of Britain ===
After the conclusion of the novel, Grossman adds a "Historical Note." He confronts the reality that people have been telling and retelling King Arthur’s story for nearly 1,400 years, never "quite the same way twice." He acknowledges, “Every age and every teller leaves traces on the story, and as it passes from one hand to the next, it evolves and changes and flows like water.”

Grossman explains not only where his novel fits in, but why he made certain literary choices.

In an interview with Jane Ciabattari for Literary Hub, he states:

In terms of the canon, I was thinking about all of those writers you mentioned, especially Malory and T.H. White and Bradley, but also some of the earlier Arthur stuff—Geoffrey of Monmouth, Gawain and the Green Knight, Clwch and Olwen, the Mabinogion.

Ian Mond notes in his review for Locus Magazine that Grossman's Arthurian perspective fits within the modern trend:

In more recent years, authors have started questioning and probing the underlying assumptions of the broader narrative.…Lavie Tidhar’s magnificent By Force Alone … with a kung-fu Lancelot and a gangster Arthur … [and] Tracy Deonn, with the publication of Legendborn, set Arthur’s tale in North Carolina …", using the experience of a “Black teenage girl in the South …"

And Kiersten White, in The New York Times wrote:

“Grossman’s version acknowledges that the Merlin of tradition is a sexual predator, and Nimue, a bold young woman trying to reconcile her Christian faith with her elemental magic, makes a far more interesting mage.”

== Major Themes ==
=== Accepting the new reality ===
Arthur is dead and the Saxons are coming.

Lev Grossman stated in an interview with Jane Ciabattari for Literary Hub: “I wanted what was in some ways a post-apocalyptic story. I wanted to know what happens to the people who have to keep on living after the end of the world.”

Kiersten White for the New York Times wrote, “We didn’t need to know what happened after Arthur died, but Arthuriana is far richer for the fact that Grossman, like countless storytellers before him, couldn’t let the dream of Camelot go."

Ian Mond notes in his review for Locus Magazine

Grossman recasts the narrative as a story about change. … Collum gradually comes to realise that the Britain he understood is no more, no longer a homogenous culture (if it ever was), but a diverse place populated by Romans, Picts, Angles, and the like.

=== The divine vs. the magical ===
Kiersten White wrote that, “Traditional Arthurian legends balance two opposing imperatives: reveling in magical paganism and reassuring us that God is the ultimate and only power in the world. Grossman successfully leans into this fundamental contradiction.”

Collum confronts this several times in the novel. When considering the stone circles of Britain, he ponders that, "They were a very different proposition from Christianity, which promised you everything … but in the next world … and only if you kept to His rules in this world". The stones "made no promises, so they couldn't break any. They didn't speak, and therefore they couldn't lie. They asked for nothing." He continues, "The more he saw of it the more the world seemed to Collum to be possessed of two incompatible, irreconcilable natures, the divine and the magical."

Nimue wrestles with the same dilemma. On becoming Merlin’s apprentice:

It was no kind of job for a good Christian girl, but how could she refuse it? It was deeply confusing to her, even hurtful, that the only way she could survive in God's world was by practicing pagan magic, but it couldn't be worse than starvation or prostitution, could it?

In one of the several climactic scenes of the novel, the forces of magic and the divine fight for control of The Holy Lance to determine who will rule Britain.

When finally Arthur, Lancelot, and Gawain see The Grail, Arthur questions the nature of The Grail: "After all, there were both God and Fairy in this world. Might not there be something greater than either of them, that engendered them both?"

== Reception ==
The Bright Sword was released to positive reviews.

The Wall Street Journal's review wrote that it "stands out as the best fantasy of the year." The Washington Post's Elizabeth Hand called it "a thrilling new take on Arthurian legend" and a "splendid, offbeat quest." Wailin Wong for NPR wrote, "I was very excited to get my hands on this book — and it did not disappoint" and "I recommend it whether you are a huge King Arthur head or not."

Kiersten White for the New York Times wrote that the novel "resoundingly earns its place among the best of Arthurian tales" and that "this Camelot is far more diverse and thoughtful than past iterations." She also noted, "The book is long, more than 600 pages, and it feels long. The story meanders, but other than a few back story chapters that are, if not unnecessary, perhaps mistimed, nothing feels superfluous. This is a narrative that demands and rewards patience.

TIME magazine named it one of their 100 must-read books of 2024. The Bright Sword was a nominee for Goodreads Readers' Favorite Fantasy award for 2024. It was a finalist for the 2025 World Fantasy Award and the 2024 Los Angeles Times Book Prize in Science Fiction, Fantasy, and Speculative Fiction.
