= American Petroleum Institute =

Oil and natural gas trade association

- Formation: March 20, 1919; 107 years ago
- Tax ID no.: 13-0433430
- Legal status: 501(c)(6)
- Headquarters: Washington, D.C. (since 1969)
- Members: Nearly 600 companies in petroleum industry
- President and CEO: Mike Sommers
- Revenue: $239,392,392 (2022)
- Expenses: $241,637,261 (2022)
- Website: www.api.org

The American Petroleum Institute (API) is the largest U.S. trade association for the oil and natural gas industry. It claims to represent nearly 600 corporations involved in production, refinement, distribution, and many other aspects of the petroleum industry. It has advanced climate change denial and blocking of climate legislation to defend the interests of its constituent organizations.

The association describes its mission as "to promote safety across the industry globally and influence public policy in support of a strong, viable U.S. oil and natural gas industry". API's chief functions on behalf of the industry include advocacy, negotiation and lobbying with governmental, legal, and regulatory agencies; research into economic, toxicological, and environmental effects; establishment and certification of industry standards; and education outreach. API both funds and conducts research related to many aspects of the petroleum industry.

== History ==
Previous logo

Although some oil was produced commercially before 1859 as a byproduct from salt brine wells, the American oil industry started on a major scale with the discovery of oil at the Drake Well in western Pennsylvania in 1859.

The American Petroleum Institute was founded on March 20, 1919, and based in New York City.

In 1959, at a symposium organized by the American Petroleum Institute and the Columbia Graduate School of Business for the centennial of the American oil industry, the physicist Edward Teller warned then of the danger of global climate change. Edward Teller explained that carbon dioxide "in the atmosphere causes a greenhouse effect" and that burning more fossil fuels could "melt the icecap and submerge New York".

In 1969, the API decided to move its offices to Washington, DC.

== Standards and certification ==
API Standards Committees are made up of subcommittees and task groups that works and maintain these standards.

API also defines the industry standard for the energy conservation of motor oil. As of 2020 API SP is the latest specification. It supersedes API SN. SP specifies more stringent engine oil performance requirements for spark-ignited internal combustion engines. These include a chain wear test and a test for very low-viscosity engine oils. The standards also include a test designed to protect against a phenomenon experienced by some gasoline engines known as Low-Speed Pre-Ignition (LSPI).

API also defines and drafts standards for measurement for manufactured products.

Crude Oil Data Exchange (CODE) is the electronic business standard as of 1978.

API RP 500 and RP 505 classify the locations for electrical equipment in hazardous areas.

API has entered petroleum industry nomenclature in a number of areas:

- API gravity, a measure of the density of petroleum.
- API number, a unique identifier applied to each petroleum exploration or production well drilled in the United States.
- API unit, a standard measure of natural gamma radiation measured in a borehole.
- "Non-API", an item (e.g., tubular connector) not conforming to API standards
- "Non-API", (informal) slang term for anything out of the norm.

== Educator information ==
In addition to training industry workers and conducting seminars, workshops, and conferences on public policy, API develops and distributes materials and curricula for schoolchildren and educators. The association also maintains a website, Classroom Energy.

== Public relations and lobbying ==
API spent more than $3 million annually during the period 2005 to 2009 on lobbying. As of 2009, according to API’s quarterly “Lobbying Report” submitted to the U.S. Senate, the organization had 16 lobbyists lobbying Congress. According to an investigation conducted by the International Business Times, API lobbied the Department of State for all of 2009 on "legislative efforts concerning oil sands" and "Canadian Oil Sands."

The American Petroleum Institute also lobbied the State Department every quarter in 2009. In three of four quarters, the group listed “legislative efforts concerning oil sands” as one of the areas it was focusing on in its lobbying, and in the final quarter, it listed “Canadian Oil Sands.” Among API’s members are ExxonMobil, which has invested in Canadian oil sands.

API lobbies and organizes its member employees' attendance at public events to communicate the industry's position on issues. A leaked summer 2009 memo from then API President Jack Gerard asked its member companies to urge their employees to participate in planned protests (designed to appear independently organized) against the cap-and-trade legislation the House passed that same summer. "The objective of these rallies is to put a human face on the impacts of unsound energy policy and to aim a loud message at [20 different] states," including Florida, Georgia, and Pennsylvania. Gerard went on to assure recipients of the memo that API will cover all organizational costs and handling of logistics. In response to the memo, an API spokesman told media that participants will be there (at protests) because of their own concerns, and that API is just helping them assemble.

To help fight climate control legislation that has been approved by the U.S. House, API supports the Energy Citizens group, which is holding public events. API encouraged energy company employees to attend one of its first Energy Citizen events held in Houston in August 2009, but turned away Texas residents who were not employed by the energy industry. Fast Company reported that some attendees had no idea of the purpose of the event. In December 2009, Mother Jones magazine said API and Energy Citizens were promulgating climate disinformation.

In January 2012, the American Petroleum Institute launched the voter education campaign – Vote 4 Energy. The campaign says that increased domestic energy production can create jobs, increase government revenue, and provide U.S. energy security. The Vote 4 Energy campaign does not promote any specific candidate or party, but rather provides voters with energy information to equip them to evaluate candidates on the federal and local levels and make decisions in favor of domestic energy on Election Day. The main components of the Vote 4 Energy campaign include the website – Vote4Energy.org – and social media communities, along with a series of advertisements and events around the country. The Vote 4 Energy campaign was criticized for presenting misleading arguments about the relationship between oil production and jobs whilst ignoring the potentially catastrophic consequences of increased fossil fuel consumption on the Earth's climate.

The API successfully pushed for an end to a ban on American oil exports on the grounds that the ban increased demand for Russian and Iranian oil, thereby benefiting the unfriendly regimes in these countries. Critics noted that many of its member companies continued to maintain ongoing business in these countries whilst the lobbying campaign was in progress, leading to accusations of hypocrisy. Furthermore, the API's campaigns have been criticized for advocating policies that are likely to exacerbate global warming and its associated problems. The API has repeatedly funded conservative groups that deny the reality of anthropogenic global warming in spite of the overwhelming scientific consensus that it presents a serious problem for the planet.

It has many front groups, including the NH Energy Forum that in August 2011 hosted a New Hampshire event for Republican presidential candidate Rick Perry.

In March 2022, the Climate Committee of the API reportedly approved a draft proposal urging Congress to pass a carbon tax on fossil fuels. The draft proposal is subject to further approval by the API Executive Committee. The proposal calls for gasoline wholesalers, power plants and others to pay a tax of $35 to $50 per ton of carbon dioxide generated by the fossil fuel they sell or use. The proposal drew criticism amid coincident high prices at the pump and elsewhere. In June 2021, in a sting operation carried out by Unearthed, senior ExxonMobil lobbyist Keith McCoy revealed that the company was 'for a carbon tax' because 'it gives us a talking point'. In reality, McCoy stated, a carbon tax 'is not gonna happen'.

=== Willie Soon ===
In February 2015, it was revealed that climate denier Willie Soon had been paid by several fossil fuel interest groups. Over the course of 14 years, he had received a total of $1.25m from Exxon Mobil, Southern Company, the American Petroleum Institute (API) and a foundation run by the libertarian Koch brothers, the documents obtained by Greenpeace show. The scientist described his studies to fossil fuel executives as "deliverables", and permitted anonymous pre-publication reviews. Soon advanced the widely discredited theory that changes in solar activity are to blame for climate change, and called into question the severity and extent of climate change in all his studies, never revealing his backers.

== Inventory reports ==
Every Tuesday (unless Monday is a holiday) at 4:30 PM the API releases a report on US inventories of crude oil, gasoline and distillates, to paid subscribers. As this information predates the report on the same inventory levels by the Energy Information Administration (EIA), it gives investors an early look at the information that may be coming from the EIA, although there is frequently some disparity between the two sets of figures.

== See also ==
- United States Oil & Gas Association, formerly the Mid-Continent Oil & Gas Association
