= Call Call Call =

Studio album by U;Nee
- Released: February 18, 2005
- Recorded: 2004–2005
- Genres: K-pop; R&B
- Label: Synnara Music

U;Nee chronology
U;Nee Code (2003)	Call Call Call (2005)	Habit (2007)

Passion & Pure - EP
- EP cover

Call Call Call (also known as 2nd Album) is the second studio album by South Korean singer, U;Nee. It was released on February 18, 2005, by Synnara Music. It was the last album to be released during her lifetime.

== Background ==
U;Nee started her singing career in 2003 with the album U;Nee Code, promoting the tracks "Go" and "Trick 2". Call Call Call was her second album in 1 year and 6 months—recording finished in November 2004, and U;Nee spent the remaining time before release practicing dance. After the album was repeatedly delayed, U;Nee developed depression, recalling that she questioned if being a singer was right for her; she was able to overcome the pressure through praying and visiting church.

== Composition ==
Call Call Call is primarily an R&B album. It was produced by Jo Seong-jin, with U;Nee contributing lyrics for four of its tracks, including "Don't Cry Again" and "One". The title track, "Call Call Call", was composed by Park Seong-ho of Goofy; described as a "flashy dance song", it combines R&B and dance-pop with K-pop sensibilities. The following track, "Father", is a medium tempo hip hop song dedicated "to those who are going through hard times". The album also includes the bonus track "I Want You", a dance-pop song in the style of her debut album.

== Track listing ==
Call Call Call
No.	Title	Writer(s)	Composer(s)	Length
1.	"One"	U;Nee	조성진	3:49
2.	"아버지 (Father)"	조진광	최수영	4:04
3.	"Call Call Call"	강우경	박성호	3:31
4.	"전화해 (Call Me)"	서정일	서정일	4:29
5.	"여우 (Fox)"	강우경	박성호	3:10
6.	"유혹 (Seduction)"	U;Nee	이한범	3:32
7.	"Don't Cry Again"	U;Nee	Farhad Zand, Louise Fait, Chazz Gaither	3:02
8.	"그 날 이후 (After that Day)"	조진광	두경석	4:10
9.	"립스틱 (Lipstick)"	강우경	박성호	3:18
10.	"초대 (Invitation)"	박민정	최수영	3:32
11.	"I Want You"	U;Nee	조성진	2:54
12.	"Call Call Call (Version 2)"	강우경	박성호	3:53
Total length:				43:28

=== Passion & Pure - EP ===
1. "Call Call Call (Club Mix)" (Samples "In da Club", by 50 Cent.)
2. "전화해 (Club Mix)" (Samples "Let Me Blow Ya Mind", by Eve)
3. "여우 (Club Mix)" (Samples "Mundian To Bach Ke", by Panjabi MC)
4. "One"
5. "아버지 (Father)"
6. "Call Call Call"
7. "전화해"
8. "그날 이후"
9. "초대 (Invitation)"
10. "I Want You"

== Promoted songs ==
- Call Call Call (Ver. 2)
- Call Call Call (Club Mix)
- 아버지 (Father)
