= Product code =

Product code is a unique identifier, assigned to each finished/manufactured product which is ready, to be marketed or for sale.

Product code may also refer to:

- Universal Product Code, common barcode used to identify packaged products
- Electronic Product Code, an RFID code mainly applied as a packaging code for packaged products
- Motion Picture Production Code (production code for short)
- Product key, a number used to verify the authenticity of a software as a license code
- Serial number, a number identifying an item per instance

== See also ==
- Barcode
- Code (disambiguation)
- Part number
