= Formation evaluation gamma ray =

The formation evaluation gamma ray log is a record of the variation with depth of the natural radioactivity of earth materials in a wellbore. Measurement of natural emission of gamma rays in oil and gas wells are useful because shales and sandstones typically have different gamma ray levels. Shales and clays are responsible for most natural radioactivity, so gamma ray log often is a good indicator of such rocks. In addition, the log is also used for correlation between wells, for depth correlation between open and cased holes, and for depth correlation between logging runs.

== Physics ==
Natural radioactivity is the spontaneous decay of the atoms of certain isotopes into other isotopes. If the resultant isotope is not stable, it undergoes further decay until a stable isotope forms. The decay process is usually accompanied by emissions of alpha, beta, and gamma radiation. Natural gamma ray radiation is one form of spontaneous radiation emitted by unstable nuclei. Gamma (γ) radiation may be considered either as an electromagnetic wave similar to visible light or X-rays, or as a particle of photon. Gamma rays are electromagnetic radiations emitted from an atomic nucleus during radioactive decay, with the wavelength in the range of 10^{−9} to 10^{−11}cm

=== Natural radioactivity in rocks ===
Fig1: Gamma-ray Spectra

Isotopes naturally found on earth are usually those that are stable or have a decay time larger than, or at least a significant fraction of the age of the Earth (about 5 billion years). Isotopes with shorter halflifes mainly exist as decay products from longer lived isotopes, and, as in C14, from irradiation of the upper atmosphere.

Radioisotopes with a sufficiently long halflife, and whose decay produces an appreciable amount of gamma rays are:

- Potassium ^{40}K with half-life of 1.3 billion years, which emits 0 α, 1 β, and 1 γ-ray
- Thorium ^{232}Th with half-life of 14 billion years, which emits 7 α, 5 β, and numerous γ-ray with different energies
- Uranium ^{238}U with half-life of 4.4 billion years, which emits 8 α, 6 β, and numerous γ-ray with different energies

Each of these elements emits gamma-rays with distinctive energy. Figure 1 shows the energies of emitted gamma-ray from the three main isotopes. Potassium 40 decays directly to stable argon 40 with the emission of 1.46 MeV gamma-ray. Uranium 238 and thorium 232 decay sequentially through a long sequence of various isotopes until a final stable isotope. The spectrum of the gamma-rays emitted by these two isotopes consists of gamma-ray of many different energies and form a complete spectra. The peak of thorium series can be found at 2.62 MeV and the Uranium series at 1.76 MeV.

== Applications ==
The most common sources of natural gamma rays are potassium, thorium, and uranium. These elements are found in feldspars (i.e. granites, feldspathic), volcanic and igneous rocks, sands containing volcanic ash, and clays.

Gamma-ray measurement has the following applications:

- Well to well correlation: gamma-ray log fluctuates with changes in formation mineralogy. As such, gamma-ray logs from different wells within the same field or region can be very useful for correlation purposes, because similar formations show similar features.
- Logging runs correlation: Gamma-ray tools is typically run in every logging tools runs in a well. Being a common measurement, logging data can be put on depth with each other by correlating the gamma-ray feature of each run.
- Quantitative evaluation of shaliness: Since natural radioactive elements tend to have greater concentration in shales than in other sedimentary lithologies, the total gamma ray measurement is frequently used to derive a shale volume (Ellis-1987, Rider-1996). This method however, is only likely to be used in a simple sandstone-shale formation, and is subject to error when radioactive elements are present in the sand.

== Interpretation ==
Gamma-ray detected by Gamma-ray detector in an oil or gas wells, is not only a function of radioactivity of the formations, but also other factors as follows:

- Borehole Fluid: the influence of borehole fluid depends on its volume (i.e. hole size), the position of the tool, its density, and composition. Potassium chloride (KCl) in mud, for example, flows into permeable sections, resulting in an increase in gamma ray activity.
- Tubing, Casing, etc.: Their effect depend on the thickness, density, and nature of the materials (e.g. steel, aluminum). Steel reduces the gamma-ray level, but can be corrected once the density and thickness of the casing, cement sheath and borehole fluid are known.
- Cement: Its impact is determined by the type of cement, additives, density and thickness
- Bed Thickness: Gamma-ray reading does not reflect the true value in a bed with a thickness less than the diameter of the sphere of investigation. In a series of thin beds, the log reading is a volume average of the contributions within the sphere.

In addition, all radioactive phenomena are random in nature. Count rates vary about a mean value, and counts must be averaged over time to obtain a reasonable estimate of the mean. The longer the averaged period and the higher the count rate, the more precise the estimate.

Sample of corrections required for different gamma-ray tools are available from Schlumberger. Gamma ray log interpretation show different peaks in well. Shale are represent the Sharp Peaks and its range is 40-140 API and contain the high amount of potassium.

== Measurement technique ==
Older gamma-ray detectors use the Geiger-Mueller counter principle, but have been mostly replaced thallium-doped sodium-iodide (NaI) scintillation detector, which has a higher efficiency. NaI detectors are usually composed of a NaI crystal coupled with a photomultiplier. When gamma ray from formation enters the crystal, it undergoes successive collisions with the atoms of the crystal, resulting in a short flashes of light when the gamma-ray is absorbed. The light is detected by the photomultiplier, which converts the energy into an electric pulse with amplitude proportional to the gamma-ray energy. The number of electric pulses is recorded in counts per seconds (CPS). The higher the gamma-ray count rate, the larger the clay content and vice versa.

Primary calibration of gamma-ray tool is the test pit at the University of Houston. The artificial formation simulate about twice the radioactivity of a shale, which generates 200 API units of gamma radiation. The detector crystal is affected by hydration and its response changes with time. Consequently, a secondary and a field calibration is achieved with a portable jig carrying a small radioactive source.

== See also ==
- Gamma ray logging
- Gamma ray
- Formation evaluation
