= The Magicians (Grossman novel) =

2009 fantasy novel by Lev Grossman

- Cover of The Magicians
- Author: Lev Grossman
- Language: English
- Series: The Magicians trilogy
- Genre: Contemporary fantasy; Low fantasy; Parallel universe
- Publisher: Viking; Penguin Books
- Publication date: 2009
- Publication place: United States
- Media type: Print
- Pages: 402 pp (first edition)
- ISBN: 978-0-670-02055-3
- LC Class: PS3557.R6725 M34
- Followed by: The Magician King

The Magicians is a new adult fantasy novel by the American author Lev Grossman, published in 2009 by Viking Press. It tells the story of Quentin Coldwater, a young man who discovers and attends a secret college of magic in New York. The novel received critical acclaim and was followed by a sequel, The Magician King, in 2011 and a third novel, The Magician's Land, in 2014.

A television series adaptation of the novels premiered on Syfy in 2015. Grossman has also worked on two comic book stories based on his novels.

== Plot ==
Quentin Coldwater is a high school student from Brooklyn who, along with best friends James and (also crush) Julia, attends an advanced school. He loves a series of books called "Fillory and Further", in which the five Chatwin children visit a Narnia-esque magical land called Fillory.

On the day of his Princeton interview, Quentin is instead transported to Brakebills College for Magical Pedagogy, the only school for magic in North America. He passes the tests and interviews and is accepted as one of twenty new students.

Quentin soon finds that the study of magic is difficult and tedious, requiring him to learn many old and lost languages and innumerable hand positions. Despite this, Quentin and his classmates Penny and Alice are allowed to move up a year by compressing their first year of studies. Penny does not pass and stays behind, to his dismay. One day during class, a bored Quentin tampers with a spell. An otherworldly horror referred to as "the Beast" then enters Brakebills, eating a student before the faculty are able to drive it away.

Third-year students are assigned a Discipline. Although Quentin's Discipline does not manifest itself, he and Alice are sorted into the Physical magic group, which includes Eliot, Josh, and Janet, a year above them. For a semester of their fourth year, they are all sent to Brakebills South in Antarctica where they practice in silence and isolation. Quentin and Alice begin a relationship.

During a summer vacation, Quentin is confronted by Julia. She reveals that she took the Brakebills entrance exam at the same time as Quentin, but failed. Failed applicants' memories of the school and of the existence of magic are wiped, but on Julia the erasure was imperfect; she has become obsessed with learning magic. Quentin tells her the school's location, hoping she will have her memory properly erased.

Upon graduation, Quentin and the other Physical Kids live in Manhattan and spend their days and nights in hedonistic pursuits, still looking for a purpose. Quentin eventually drunkenly sleeps with Janet, resulting in a break in his relationship with Alice. Penny arrives with news that he has left Brakebills early after his specialized study of the Neitherlands, a realm between many worlds that leads to many other realms. Fillory is real; Penny has come into possession of a button that will allow others to go there with him.

The magicians enter Fillory and search for a quest, finding it more dangerous and divided than the books indicated. Eventually, they set out for Ember's tomb to retrieve the crown of Martin Chatwin, the eldest child from the "Fillory and Further" books, to establish themselves as the new Kings and Queens of Fillory. They are disturbed by the violent trials they endure before meeting Ember, the ram god of Fillory, in the tomb. However, they learn that Ember has been weakened and is being kept prisoner while his brother, Umber, is dead. Against Ember's instructions, Quentin blows a mysterious horn, which summons the Beast; he is revealed to be Martin Chatwin, who sacrificed his humanity in order to stay in Fillory forever and has taken over. He intends to destroy the button so he can never be banished. In a brutal battle, Martin eats Penny's hands, and Alice sacrifices herself to kill Martin.

Six months later, Quentin awakes from a coma in the care of Fillorian centaurs. The other magicians returned to Earth, fearing that Quentin would never awaken. Penny chose to remain in the Neitherlands, entering a mysterious library. Quentin becomes depressed and disillusioned, especially when Jane, the youngest Chatwin, visits and reveals herself to be the Watcherwoman (a villain from the book series). By using a time-traveling device, Jane pulled the strings throughout her siblings' and Quentin's stories, finally succeeded in killing Martin by leading Quentin and his friends to the confrontation. Jane then immediately breaks her device in order to prevent this chain of events from being altered.

Quentin therefore chooses to travel across Fillory to hunt down the Questing Beast, but it is unable to grant his wishes to bring back Alice and heal Penny's hands. Quentin wishes to return to Earth. Quentin chooses to renounce magic, feeling that power and his search for purpose have only caused problems. Brakebills sets him up in a high-paying office job, where he remains depressed. One day, Eliot and Janet show up with Julia, who has learned magic, asking Quentin to return to Fillory with them to become its Kings and Queens. They encourage him to accept that everyone, including Alice, was responsible for their own choices on the quest. Quentin joins them.

== Influences ==
Grossman has publicly discussed his literary influences and has referred to T.H. White as his "literary mentor", particularly to the influence that The Once and Future King has had on his work. The novel and its sequels are also greatly indebted to C. S. Lewis's The Chronicles of Narnia. Other literary influences include Harry Potter, A Wizard of Earthsea, Jonathan Strange and Mr. Norrell, Watchmen, Larry Niven's Warlock stories, and Fritz Leiber's Fafhrd and Gray Mouser stories, while the film Highlander helped influence the feel of the novel's world. He had originally wanted to provide a direct connection to Lewis' novels and include The Wood between the Worlds, however his publishing house's lawyers objected. He consequently replaced its appearance with the similarly themed Neitherlands instead. Grossman has stated that the plot itself began as a dream about a beast invading a magical classroom.

== Reception ==
The review by The A.V. Club gave the novel an "A", calling it "the best urban fantasy in years, a sad dream of what it means to want something badly and never fully reach it." The New York Times review said the book "could crudely be labeled a Harry Potter for adults", injecting "mature themes" into fantasy literature.

The Magicians won the 2010 Alex Award, given to ten adult books that are appealing to young adults, and its author won the 2011 John W. Campbell Award for Best New Writer.
