= Recode (disambiguation) =

Recode is a technology news website.

Recode or recoding may also refer to:

- Recode (database), a biological database
- Recode, an act or product of transcoding a digital bitstream
- Recoding (biology), the process of genetic translation
- Recode (non-profit organization)

== See also ==
- Decoder (disambiguation)
- Code (disambiguation)
- Decoding (disambiguation)
