= The Magician King =

2011 novel by Lev Grossman

- Cover of The Magician King
- Author: Lev Grossman
- Language: English
- Series: The Magicians trilogy
- Genre: High fantasy, Parallel universe
- Publisher: Viking Press (US); Heinemann (UK)
- Publication date: 2011
- Publication place: United States
- Media type: Print
- Pages: 400 pp (first edition)
- ISBN: 978-0-670-02231-1
- LC Class: PS3557.R6725 M28
- Preceded by: The Magicians
- Followed by: The Magician's Land

The Magician King is a fantasy novel by Lev Grossman, published in 2011 by Viking Press, the sequel to The Magicians and the second volume in The Magicians trilogy. It continues the story of Quentin Coldwater, interweaving it with the story of his high school friend, Julia, who learned magic outside of the standard school setting and joined him in Fillory.

== Plot summary ==
The Magician King follows two story lines, beginning at the same time as the beginning and end of The Magicians. In one, following her unsuccessful interview at Brakebills, Julia returns to Brooklyn. A poorly constructed alibi reveals to her the memories of her interview and the world of magic that wasn't available to her. After a significant amount of searching, she finds her way to a safe house where low-level spells are taught. Gradually, she works her way up the levels, learning more and more magic, until the safe houses have no more to teach her. She makes contact with Free Trader Beowulf, a group of people like her: self taught magicians with significant psychological issues. She moves to Murs, in France, to work with them, where they teach her more magic.

Julia and the others in Murs, in order to attain significantly more magical power, attempt to summon Our Lady Underground, a local goddess. They instead summon Reynard the Fox, a trickster god who kills most of them while warning them that no one has summoned a god in 2000 years, that all the gods heard them including the ancient ones, and they might as well be dead when the gods come. He intends to kill the last two, but Julia sacrifices herself to save her friend Asmodeus. Reynard proceeds to rape Julia, leaving her with severe trauma and an extra spark of god-like magic.

In Fillory, Eliot, Janet, Quentin, and Julia rule as Kings and Queens, and life is good, if somewhat boring. Seeking a quest, Quentin and Julia travel to the outer islands of Fillory to collect back taxes, where they discover a golden key and are accidentally returned to Earth. Searching for a way back, Quentin and Julia discover Josh in Venice, where he has sold the button he had which allowed travel between worlds to the dragon in the grand canal. With him is Poppy, an Australian magician who studies dragons. Quentin visits and speaks to the dragon, who warns him of the old gods' return and the impending closure of the Neitherlands, the city in between the worlds.

Quentin and Julia are able to return to Fillory, unintentionally bringing Poppy and Josh with them. There they encounter Eliot, who has been on a quest to find the remaining golden keys. In an attempt to return Poppy to Earth, Quentin and Poppy end up in the Neitherlands, where Penny, Quentin's erstwhile classmate, finds them.

As Penny explains, access to magic is through a loophole that was never intended, and the old gods, who are effectively just magicians operating on a titanic power scale, have returned to close that loophole. Fillory is the loophole through which magic escaped, and the end of magic will mean its end too. The founders of the Neitherlands did build a back door through which magic could come if the gods ever returned to shut it down, and it is locked by the same seven golden keys Quentin and Eliot have been searching for. Quentin and Poppy return to Fillory.

Quentin and Julia travel to the underworld, where they collect the last key and where Julia is made a dryad by Our Lady Underground. They open the door at the edge of the world, allowing magic back, and opening the way to the far side of Fillory. Quentin cannot go through as he used his passport in visiting the underworld, and when he accepts the debt Julia owes for causing the catastrophe, allowing her through, he is forced to give up his throne and leave Fillory. Alone, he returns to Earth.

== Reception ==
The book garnered good reviews from most venues, including Emily VanDerWerff at The Onion's The A.V. Club, who gave it an A, writing that the sequel was "clearly the middle book in a trilogy, but it’s that rare creature that bridges the gap between tales and still stands on its own."

A sequel, titled The Magician's Land, was published in August 2014, incorporating the events of the short story "The Girl in the Mirror" (published as part of the anthology Dangerous Women).

Critical discussion centred around the rape of Julia by the god Reynard the Fox. Writing in ThinkProgress, Alyssa Rosenberg criticised the way that sexual violence was depicted as something that Julia could not heal from, noting "What bothers me about this is less that it’s graphic than that it’s final. Julia loses her soul when Reynard rapes her, and she never gets a chance to get it back. The only way she’s able to heal is to acknowledge that her humanity is unrecoverable." She also criticises the structural role of the events in Quentin's development, writing "But it makes me really sad to think that it takes a woman he essentially abandoned, even though he knew she was vulnerable and that his actions contributed to her mental breakdown, getting raped and experiencing the theft of her soul, to wake Quentin up." Writing in Slate, Choire Sicha said "The rape is the dodgiest event of the three books, it seems obvious to say...Some found the rape upsetting but not necessarily exploitative; after all, this is a series where someone gets his hands eaten off, so it’s not out of left field. It is likely what it is meant to be: Horrifying, grotesque, unreal, real."
