= CODE =

CODE may refer to:

== Organizations ==
- Call of Duty Endowment, a non-profit foundation
- CODE University of Applied Sciences, a university in Berlin
- Confederation of Democracy (Confederación de la Democracia) (1972), a defunct political coalition in Chile

== Other uses ==
- Code (album) (stylized C O D E), a 1987 album by Cabaret Voltaire
- Code Sports, stylized CODE
- Crude Oil Data Exchange, an electronic business standard sanctioned by the American Petroleum Institute
- Cultural Olympiad Digital Edition, a digital art showcase at the 2010 Winter Olympics
- An abbreviation for Collabora Online Development Edition

== See also ==
- Code (disambiguation)
