= U;Nee =

South Korean singer and actress (1981–2007)

- Portrait of U;Nee
- Born: Lee Hye-ryeon; May 3, 1981; Seoul, South Korea
- Died: January 21, 2007 (aged 25); Incheon, South Korea
- Cause of death: Suicide by hanging
- Other name: Heo Yun
- Occupations: Singer; rapper; model; dancer; actress
- Musical career
- Genres: K-pop; dance-pop; R&B
- Years active: 1996–2007
- Labels: Synnara; J'S

Korean name
- Hangul: 허윤
- Hanja: 許允
- RR: Heo Yun
- MR: Hŏ Yun

Former name
- Hangul: 이혜련
- Hanja: 李慧蓮
- RR: I Hyeryeon
- MR: I Hyeryŏn

Heo Yun (Korean: 허윤; born Lee Hye-ryeon (이혜련), May 3, 1981 – January 21, 2007), best known professionally as U;Nee (유니), was a South Korean singer, rapper, dancer and actress. She made her debut as a singer with her first album U;Nee Code (2003).

U;Nee died by suicide on January 21, 2007, at age 25.

== Early life ==
U;Nee was born as Lee Hye-ryeon in Incheon, South Korea. She had a difficult childhood and was born to an unwed mother. Her father died when she was young and she was raised by her grandmother as result.

As a child, she was known to be a very good student during her elementary school years, but later in high school, U;nee showed interest in acting and, in general, in show business, thus forming her dream of one day appearing on television and being a star, which her mother opposed. However, U;Nee secretly attended acting classes in academies and participated in numerous castings.

== Acting career ==
U;Nee initially debuted as an actress under birth name in 1996, getting a role in the KBS teen series called New Generation Report – Adults Don't Know, where she played a narcissistic teenager. Despite playing a villain, her performance received criticism due to the self-centered nature of the character.

After her debut, U;Nee went on to appear in Korean entertainment programs such as "Super Sunday" on South Korea's KBS2, which helped her gain moderate attention. However, the roles U;Nee received were self-centered and narcissistic like the one in her debut, which formed a negative image on her by people who did not know how to separate the acting from the person.

After these criticisms and added to her role in the movie Seventeen which according to her mother had a great impact on her mentally, U;nee decided to take a break from acting and thus set in motion her dream of becoming a singer, taking advantage of the hiatus to take singing and dancing lessons.

== Music career ==
=== 2003: Debut and U;Nee Code ===
On June 12, 2003, U;Nee debuted as a singer with the song "Go" (가) from her first studio album U;nee Code. The song was featured in games such as Pump It Up: Exceed and NX2. Throughout this time, U;Nee was busy promoting this song along with her other song "Double Trick" (두번째 트릭) on music programs as well as appearing on variety programs. However, her appearance in these shows contrasted with U;Nee's shy and quiet personality. This led her to receive malicious comments calling her "fake" and "exaggerated".

U;Nee participated in MBC's Kang Ho-Dong: Match Made in Heaven. Upon receiving 0 points in the popularity vote among the show's male contestants, she cried on air, leading to backlash of the internet. Rumors of plastic surgery began to circulate on online forums, with detractors contrasting childhood photos of her with her current appearance. At this time, a survey of talentless singers was made in which singer Lee Hyori came in first place and U;Nee came in third place, proving that the internet hatred towards U;Nee was unwarranted.

However, U;Nee also received praise for singing live in her performances; she was even praised for live songs that utilized very difficult choreography. This caused U;Nee to form a moderate fanbase.

=== 2005: Image transition, Call Call Call and Passion & Pure – EP ===
When U;Nee announced her second album Call Call Call (also known as Passion&Pure and U;Nee 2nd Album), news comments were filled with hurtful remarks such as "don't come back" and comments related to her physical appearance and surgery.

In February 2005, U;Nee released the music video for her song "Call Call Call", which managed to get a lot of attention for its horror concept and the sexy concept of the song. The song achieved some success in the music charts like Melon but this would not be enough to boost the album and its sales due to the hate from netizens.

U;Nee's live singing skills were noticeably affected, showing nervousness compared to the early performances of her first album. This was supposedly due to the hateful comments that affected U;nee and the sexy concept that U;nee was not completely comfortable with because of her reserved and quiet personality. Due to the severe criticism, U;Nee changed the wardrobe of her performances and started promoting the club version of the song, giving a more youthful look away from the sexy image.

She then promoted her album's ballad called "Father", which U;Nee said was a song she felt personal as she felt the lack of growing up without a father. U;nee also appeared on SBS variety program Happiness in ₩10,000 (만원의 행복) with her mother, where they both shed tears and talked about the hateful comments she received, where her mother asked to avoid such comments as U;Nee was a very tender and sensitive person.

Rumors started to circulate that celebrities in the industry preferred to avoid U;Nee because of her bad image, so U;Nee was invited to SBS program Image Survival (이미지 서바이벌) where it was a program that helped save celebrities' image, far from helping, U;Nee suffered humiliation and backlash from the participants, forming an uncomfortable environment for U;Nee. Then, Lee Kyung-kyu made a list of 'celebrities that I would not like my daughter Yerim to become', putting U;nee first, saying that he would not like her daughter to wear revealing clothes and act like that, then U;Nee was focused and her uncomfortable face was really noticeable.

=== 2006: U;Nee in Japan ===
In 2006, U;Nee was marketed abroad in Asia. Her debut single, "One", taken from Call Call Call, was released in Japan in February 2006. The single also included an alternate version of "Sun Cruise" from her debut album, U;Nee Code, and "Follow Me", a song that would later appear on her 3rd and final album, Habit. She held a showcase performing a variety of her songs from her Call Call Call album with great reviews, but with no more success she decided to come back and work in her third album.

She also appeared in the Goofy's music video called "Mr DJ".

== Death and impact ==
On January 21, 2007, at around 10 A.M, she sat down in front of the TV and said, "Goodbye," to her maternal grandmother, mother, and uncle as they left the house for church. When her grandmother returned from church, intending to prepare lunch for her granddaughter, she discovered U;Nee hanging in her room. She immediately called for an ambulance, but U;Nee had already died.

The police later confirmed that the cause of death was suicide due to depression and that no suicide note had been found.

The news came as a shock to all of Asia, especially since a day later U;Nee was to shoot the music video for her third album. Her agency due to this, decided to cancel the release of the album that was scheduled for February 1 of that year, but then by request of the family, it was released on January 26.

The funeral occurred the day after, only a few of her fellow celebrities attended, as U;Nee did not have many friends in the industry, among them were singer Maya, members of the girl-group Diva, Minkyoung and Jini, Kil Gun, singer Mina, and her best friend Lee Hwa-sun, who was there until the end.

Kim Jin-Pyo, criticized the South Korean singers' Association saying, "The singer's association did not make any contact with fellow singers even after the singer's death. I also didn't receive any messages and had to ask for the address myself to offer my condolences. However, when I finally arrived, there were hardly any singers present. Aren't these so-called respectful juniors from the singer's association even able to spare time for condolences at a time like this?!" Choi Baek-Ho, the vice-president of the association back then replied to Kim's statement saying, "Because of your words, the hardworking singers at the Korean Singers Association, who sacrifice a lot of time and money for the rights and status of singers, feel angry", this caused a debate with most people empathizing with Jin-Pyo and calling Baek-Ho irresponsible and unempathetic to the situation. During this time, several singers and entertainment figures had their pages filled with insults and questions as to why they did not attend U;Nee's funeral.

This had such an impact that people in the entertainment industry began to attend celebrities' funerals, even if they were not close to the deceased.

South Korean actor and singer Ryu Si-won paid tribute to U;Nee at one of his concerts in Japan. They were friends and were known to have a 10-year friendship.

Lee Hyori expressed herself about U;Nee's death in an interview on Drunken Talk saying, "If U;Nee and Jeong Da-bin were friends with me, I would have tried to help them in any way possible. It was very heartbreaking."

A month after the tragedy, SBS investigation show Unanswered Questions, in episode 416, they interviewed U;Nee's mother at her home, where she confessed that during the first album U;Nee suffered from stress, taking medication but had days of sleeping a whole day and being awake a whole day. After her second album her mother noticed that U;Nee became very reserved to the point of speaking only a few words even at home. She also said that U;Nee was affected by the hate comments and that she was not very happy about her company's decisions at the time.

They also interviewed U;Nee's manager and some staff members, they said that U;Nee seemed calm and somehow excited about the promotions of her album. They even showed footage from January 19 where U;Nee is seen smiling and practicing.

== Filmography ==
- New Generation Report – Adults Don't Know
- Seventeen
- Zilzu
- Speeding
- The Theme Game
- The Tears of a Dragon
- The King and the Queen
- X-Man

== Discography ==
=== Studio albums ===
List of studio albums, with selected details, chart positions, and sales
Title	Album details	Peak chart positions	Sales
Title	Album details	KOR	Sales
U;Nee Code	Released: June 12, 2003; Label: J'S Entertainment, DreamBeat Korea; Formats: CD, cassette	36	KOR: 10,804
Call Call Call	Released: February 18, 2005; Label: Synnara Music; Formats: CD	26	KOR: 7,657
Habit	Released: January 26, 2007; Label: Fantom Entertainment; Formats: CD	—	KOR: 1,205
"—" denotes releases that did not chart or were not released in that region.

=== Music videos ===
- "Go"
- "Call Call Call"
- "Habit"
