= Jack N. Gerard =

American LDS Church leader (born 1957)

Jack Gerard
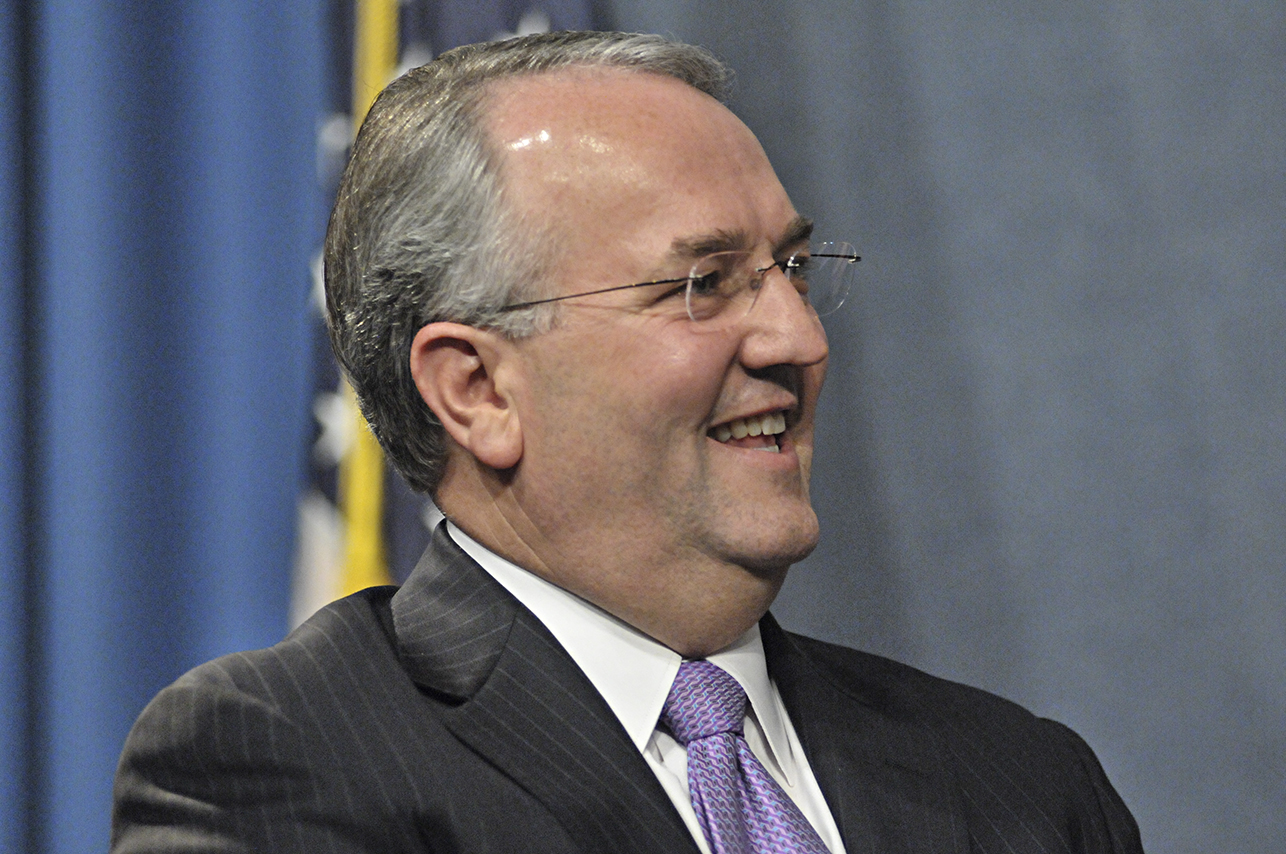

General Authority Seventy
- March 31, 2018
- Called by: Russell M. Nelson

Personal details
- Born: Jack Noel Gerard; December 15, 1957 (age 68); Idaho Falls, Idaho, U.S.
- Education: University of Idaho; George Washington University (BA, JD)
- Website: Official website

Jack Noel Gerard (born December 15, 1957) has been a general authority of the Church of Jesus Christ of Latter-day Saints (LDS Church) since April 2018. He previously served for ten years as head of the American Petroleum Institute (API), the petroleum and natural gas industry lobby group in the United States.

== Early life and education ==
Gerard was raised in Mud Lake, Idaho. His father was a salesman of John Deere tractors. For a year out of high school Gerard was a student at the University of Idaho. He then served as a missionary for the LDS Church in Sydney, Australia. He later graduated from George Washington University (GWU).

== Career ==
Following college, he worked on the staffs of George V. Hansen and James A. McClure, who served in the U.S. Congress and Senate respectively, representing Idaho. In 1990, when McClure left the Senate, Gerard followed him into the private sector, becoming part of the public relations firm McClure, Gerard & Neuenschwander.

Gerard later ran a lobbying firm with McClure. He then was head of the National Mining Association (2000–2005) and then the American Chemistry Council (2005–2008).

In his role as head of API, Gerard fought successfully to allow crude oil exports. He also opposed increased taxes and other measures that would hurt industry profits. Gerard expanded the organization's public outreach efforts to include the AFL–CIO and Congressional Hispanic Caucus, while trimming the number of API's employees and narrowing the scope of API's lobbying priorities. He also led efforts to fund and support citizen rallies in support of API's legislative priorities, drawing accusations of astroturfing from critics after a leaked memo from Gerard to local API organizers was published by Greenpeace.

In the 2012 U.S. presidential election, Gerard was a major backer of Mitt Romney's bid for president.

In the LDS Church, Gerard has served as a ward mission leader, scoutmaster, Young Men advisor, bishop, president of the McLean Virginia Stake, and area seventy in the church's North America Northeast Area (covering the US from Virginia north, and as far west as Indiana, and Canada from Ontario east) from 2010 to 2016.

Gerard was also for a time the chairman of the National Capital Area Council of the Boy Scouts of America. He also for a time was co-chair and later a board member of GWU's Graduate School of Political Management.

After becoming a general authority in the LDS Church, Gerard was appointed as the executive director of the Public Affairs Department. In July 2018, he spoke at the National Association for the Advancement of Colored People Annual Convention, announcing an educational and employment skills joint initiative between the LDS Church and the NAACP. In this position, he was a key voice in the church's successful advocacy for the state of Utah to pass new laws regulating medical marijuana.

After serving as a counselor in the presidency of the church's Europe Central Area since August 2023, it was announced in April 2026 that Gerard would become the area's president on 1 August 2026.

== Personal life ==
Gerard is married to Claudette Neff and they are the parents of eight children.
