= Kodesh =

Kodesh may refer to:

- Kodesh, a word meaning "sacred" in Hebrew, see Sacredness#Judaism
- Wolfie Kodesh (1918–2002), South African Communist party activist
- Transliteration of the Czech surname Kodeš
