= Crude Oil Data Exchange =

Crude Oil Data Exchange (CODE) is an electronic business standard sanctioned by the American Petroleum Institute. CODE was initially implemented as the standard in 1978. It provides field formats and record layouts to facilitate the transmission of crude oil run tickets between oil producers and oil transporters. Oil statement records were added to the system in January 1986. In 1989, tank increment records were added to the standard.

CODE users receive digitized run tickets, summary statements and tank tables to import into their accounting software in order to process this information electronically.
