= The Codex (Sun & Storm) =

The Codex is a 1993 role-playing supplement for Sun & Storm published by Storm Publications.

== Contents ==
The Codex is a supplement in which information is provided for the gamemaster.

== Reception ==
Wayne Ligon reviewed The Codex in White Wolf #44 (June, 1994), rating it a 2.5 out of 5 and stated that "The Codex briefly describes some of the horror aspects of the world, but there's just too little to work with."

== Reviews ==
- Shadis #15 (Sept., 1994)
