= Low-speed pre-ignition =

Event in gasoline vehicle engines

Low-speed pre-ignition (LSPI), also known as stochastic pre-ignition (SPI), is a pre-ignition event that occurs in gasoline vehicle engines when there is a premature ignition of the main fuel charge. LSPI is most common in certain turbocharged direct-injection vehicles operating in low-speed and high-load driving conditions.

LSPI events are random and infrequent, and their effects on impacted vehicles can include very high-pressure spikes, loud knocking noises and sometimes catastrophic engine damage. It's commonly known as "Detonation or Knock". Engine management systems can overcome pre ignition by the means of a knock or detonation sensor. The sensor will detect pre ignition and retard the engines timing to protect the engine from damage. Undesired engine behavior will occur such as loss of performance or power.

== Impact on engine design ==
Automakers use engine downsizing to help improve vehicles’ fuel efficiency and reduce emissions, and use turbocharger technology to recover power lost in the downsizing process. The presence of LSPI limits automakers’ ability to capture the full potential of turbocharged engines to meet increasing fuel-efficiency requirements and to further reduce carbon dioxide emissions.

Updated oil-performance standards are taking shape to address LSPI. General Motors’ next-generation dexos1 specification (Dexos 1 Gen 2), released in 2015, included an engine test based on a GM 2.0-liter four-cylinder Ecotec that will test for LSPI. The ILSAC GF-6 standard (released in 2020) also include a test for oil-related LSPI events in gasoline direct-injection engines based on a Ford 2.0 L four-cylinder Ecoboost engine. API oil category SP, introduced in May 2020, was designed to provide protection against LSPI.

== Potential solutions ==
Researchers have been unable to pinpoint a single root cause for all LSPI instances. However, tests involving the use of engine oils have shown engine oils can be formulated to prevent LSPI while maintaining the oil’s basic performances.

Southwest Research Institute (SwRI) launched the two-year Preignition Prevention Program (P3) consortium in 2011 aimed at understanding the source of LSPI and working towards developing a standardized test for lubes / fuels. The consortium's objectives included examining the interaction between fuel and oil in LSPI events, understanding how hardware design could be used to help mitigate LSPI, and identifying fluids that can help reduce LSPI occurrences.

The oil additive industry is also looking at using engine oil additives to suppress LSPI while retaining the fuel-saving benefits of existing engine technologies.
