= Kodeš =

Kodeš (Czech feminine: Kodešová) is a surname. Notable people with the surname include:

- Jan Kodeš (born 1946), Czech tennis player
- Jan Kodeš Jr. (born 1972), Czech tennis player
- Jiří Kodeš (1933–2006), Czech sprint canoer
- Petr Kodeš (born 1996), Czech footballer
- Vlasta Vopičková (born Vlasta Kodešová in 1944), Czech tennis player

== See also ==
- Kodesh (disambiguation)
