= Coding =

Coding may refer to:

== Computer science ==
- Computer programming, the process of creating and maintaining the source code of computer programs
- Line coding, in data storage
- Source coding, compression used in data transmission
- Coding theory
- Channel coding
- Encryption coding, a process of converting sensitive information into numerical code with a security key

== Other uses ==
- Coding (social sciences), an analytical process in which data are categorized for analysis
- Coding strand of DNA in molecular biology
- Legal coding, the process of creating summary or keyword data from a document in the legal profession
- Medical coding, representation of medical diagnoses and procedures in standard code numbers
- Number coding in Metro Manila, a road space rationing policy implemented in Metro Manila, Philippines, commonly referred to as "coding"
- Coding (therapy), alternative therapeutic methods used to treat addictions in the post-Soviet countries
- Queer coding

== See also ==
- Code
- Entropy encoding
- Transform coding
