= Lev Grossman =

American novelist and journalist (born 1969)

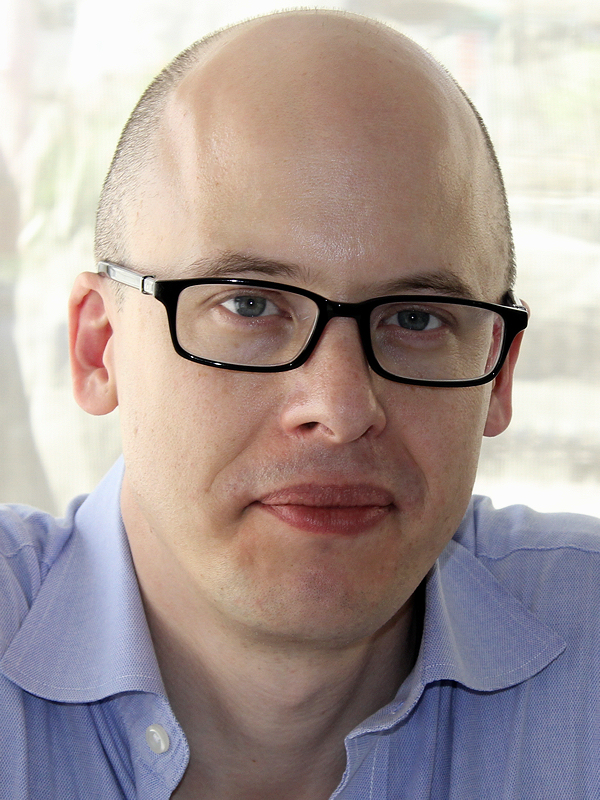
- Grossman in 2011
- Born: June 26, 1969 (age 57); Concord, Massachusetts, US
- Education: Harvard University (BA)
- Occupations: Novelist; critic; journalist
- Spouse: Sophie Gee
- Children: 3
- Parent(s): Judith Grossman (mother); Allen Grossman (father)
- Relatives: Austin Grossman (brother); Bathsheba Grossman (sister)
- Website: levgrossman.com

Lev Grossman (born June 26, 1969) is an American novelist and journalist who wrote the Magicians trilogy: The Magicians (2009), The Magician King (2011), and The Magician's Land (2014). He was the book critic and lead technology writer at Time magazine from 2002 to 2016. His recent work includes the children's book The Silver Arrow and its sequel, The Golden Swift; The Bright Sword, a reimagining of the King Arthur legend; and the screenplay for the film The Map of Tiny Perfect Things, based on his short story.

== Early life and education ==
Grossman was born in Concord, Massachusetts. He is the twin brother of video game designer and novelist Austin Grossman, a brother of sculptor Bathsheba Grossman, and son of the poet Allen Grossman and the novelist Judith Grossman. Grossman's father was born Jewish and his mother was raised Anglican, but Grossman has said, "I grew up in a very unreligious household. Very. I have no religion at all. So I come at religion as about as much of an outsider as you can be in Western civilization." On the assumption that he was raised Jewish, he has said, "I have this extremely old-world name, and people can invite me to as many Jewish book festivals as they want to—but I wasn't raised Jewish."

After graduating from Lexington High School, Grossman studied literature at Harvard University, graduating with a degree in literature in 1991.

== Career ==
=== Journalism ===
Grossman has written for The New York Times, Wired, Salon.com, Lingua Franca, Entertainment Weekly, Time Out New York, The Wall Street Journal, and The Village Voice. He has served as a member of the board of directors of the National Book Critics Circle and as the chair of the Fiction Awards Panel. In May 2015, Grossman gave the third annual Tolkien Lecture at Pembroke College, Oxford.

In writing for Time, he has also covered the consumer electronics industry, reporting on video games, blogs, viral videos and Web comics like Penny Arcade and Achewood. In 2006, he traveled to Japan to cover the unveiling of the Wii console. He has interviewed Bill Gates, Steve Jobs, Salman Rushdie, Neil Gaiman, Joan Didion, Jonathan Franzen, J. K. Rowling, and Johnny Cash. He wrote one of the earliest pieces on Stephenie Meyer's Twilight series. A piece written by Grossman on the game Halo 3 was criticized for casting gamers in an "unfavorable light". Grossman was also the author of the Time Person of the Year 2010 feature article on Facebook founder Mark Zuckerberg.

Grossman did some freelancing and wrote for other magazines. Some of the works he wrote at this time include "The Death of a Civil Servant", "Good Novels Don't Have to be Hard", "Catalog This", "The Gay Nabokov", "When Words Fail", and "Get Smart". He freelanced at The Believer, the Wall Street Journal, New York Times, Salon, Lingua Franca, and Time Digital. It was soon after this that his first novel, Warp, was published.

He quit his job at Time magazine in August 2016 to pursue writing full time.

=== Fiction ===
Lev Grossman's first novel, Warp, was published in 1997, after he moved to New York City. Warp was about "the lyrical misadventures of an aimless 20-something in Boston who has trouble distinguishing between reality and Star Trek". It received largely negative customer reviews on Amazon.com, and in response, Grossman submitted fake reviews to Amazon using false names. He then recounted these actions in an essay titled "Terrors of the Amazon". His second novel, Codex, published in 2004, became an international bestseller.

In an article for The New York Times Grossman wrote: "I wrote fiction for 17 years before I found out I was a fantasy novelist. Up till then I always thought I was going to write literary fiction, like Jonathan Franzen or Zadie Smith or Jhumpa Lahiri. But I thought wrong. ... Fantasy is sometimes dismissed as childish, or escapist, but I take what I am doing very, very seriously."

Grossman's The Magicians was published in hardcover in August 2009 and became a bestseller. The trade paperback edition was made available on May 25, 2010. The Washington Post called it "exuberant and inventive ... fresh and compelling ... a great fairy tale". The book is a dark contemporary fantasy about Quentin Coldwater, an unusually gifted young man who obsesses over Fillory, the magical land of his favorite childhood books. Unexpectedly admitted to Brakebills, a secret, exclusive college of magic in upstate New York (an amalgam of Bannerman's Castle and Olana), Quentin receives an education in the craft of modern sorcery. After graduation, he and his friends discover that Fillory is real. Michael Agger of The New York Times said the book "could crudely be labeled a Harry Potter for adults", injecting mature themes into fantasy literature. The Magicians won the 2010 Alex Award, given to ten adult books that are appealing to young adults, and the 2011 John W. Campbell Award for Best New Writer.

In August 2011, The Magician King, the sequel to The Magicians, was published, which returns readers to the magical land of Fillory, where Quentin and his friends are now kings and queens. The Chicago Tribune said The Magician King was "The Catcher in the Rye for devotees of alternative universes" and that "Grossman has created a rare, strange and scintillating novel." It was an Editor's Choice pick of The New York Times, who called it "[A] serious, heartfelt novel [that] turns the machinery of fantasy inside out." The Boston Globe said "The Magician King is a rare achievement, a book that simultaneously criticizes and celebrates our deep desire for fantasy."

The third book in the series is titled The Magician's Land and was published on August 5, 2014.

In July 2019, Grossman, with co-writer Lilah Sturges and illustrator Pius Bak, released The Magicians: Alice's Story, a graphic novel told from the perspective of Alice, a secondary character from the book series.

Grossman's first children's book, The Silver Arrow, was published in September 2020. It debuted on the New York Times Best Seller list on September 27, 2020. The Golden Swift, its sequel, was published on May 3, 2022.

In September 2016, Grossman announced that his next novel would be a take on King Arthur called The Bright Sword and in November 2023, he revealed that the novel was done and would be out the following year. Grossman explained that the book was a difficult project and outlined why it took nearly a decade to write, including historical research, the COVID-19 pandemic, and other projects. The Bright Sword was published July 16, 2024 and received a starred review from Publishers Weekly. The novel was a finalist for the 2024 Los Angeles Times Book Prize in Science Fiction, Fantasy, and Speculative Fiction.

=== Film and television ===
Grossman's Magicians trilogy was adapted for television by Sera Gamble and John McNamara for Syfy. The series received five seasons and aired from December 2015 to April 2020.

Grossman wrote the screenplay for the film The Map of Tiny Perfect Things, based on his short story of the same name. The film was released through Amazon Prime Video on February 12, 2021.

== Personal life ==
Grossman lives in Sydney, Australia, with his wife and children. Grossman is a self-professed atheist.

== Bibliography ==
- Warp, New York: St. Martin's Griffin/Macmillan, 1997. ISBN 978-0-312-17059-2
- Codex, New York: Houghton Mifflin Harcourt, 2004. ISBN 978-0-15-101066-0
- The Magicians, New York: Viking/Penguin, 2009. ISBN 978-0-670-02055-3 (hardcover); Plume/Penguin, 2010. ISBN 978-0-452-29629-9 (trade paperback)
- The Magician King, New York: Viking/Penguin, 2011. ISBN 978-0-670-02231-1
- The Magician's Land, New York: Viking/Penguin/PRH, 2014. ISBN 978-0-670-01567-2
- The Silver Arrow, Little, Brown, 2020. ISBN 978-0-316-54170-1
- The Golden Swift, Little, Brown Books for Young Readers, 2022. ISBN 9780316283861
- The Bright Sword, Penguin Random House, 2024. ISBN 978-0-7352-2404-9

=== Comics ===
- The Magicians: Alice's Story (graphic novel) (with Lilah Sturges), Archala, 2019. ISBN 978-1-684-15021-2
- The Magicians #1 (comic) (with Lilah Sturges), Boom! – Archaia, 2019 ASIN B07ZL5CK1F
- The Magicians #2 (comic) (with Lilah Sturges), Boom! – Archaia, 2019 ASIN B07ZL52X49
- The Magicians #3 (comic) (with Lilah Sturges), Boom! – Archaia, 2020 ASIN B083C4SLZW
- The Magicians #4 (comic) (with Lilah Sturges), Boom! – Archaia, 2020 ASIN B083C5F5TG

== Filmography ==
=== Film and TV ===
| Year | Title | Role | Notes |
|---|---|---|---|
| 2015–2020 | The Magicians | Series consultant | TV series based on his series The Magicians |
| 2021 | The Map of Tiny Perfect Things | Screenwriter | Film based on his short story Map |
| TBD | The Heavens | Story by | In development with the Russo brothers |

=== Other credits ===
- Neil Gaiman: Dream Dangerously (2016); as himself
- High Life (2018); special thanks
