= Codex (novel) =

2004 novel by Lev Grossman

- First edition
- Author: Lev Grossman
- Language: English
- Genre: Thriller
- Publisher: Harcourt Books/Arrow Books
- Publication date: 2004
- Publication place: United States
- Media type: Print
- Pages: 376 pp
- ISBN: 0-09-949122-2
- OCLC: 62470719

Codex is a thriller novel by Lev Grossman, first published in 2004 by Harcourt Books.

== Summary ==
The novel is about young banker Edward Wozny, who is sent by his firm to organize a mysterious client's library of rare books. He discovers the client may own a unique fourteenth-century codex that was long thought to be a hoax by medieval scholars. As he becomes involved in the mystery of the codex, he also becomes addicted to a strange computer game that seems to have parallels to his real life.

== Reception ==
In The New York Times Book Review, critic Polly Shulman wrote, "A little more than halfway through 'Codex,' an investment banker named Edward Wozny comes upon a bookcase full of 'books about books — bibliographies of obscure literary figures, catalogs of long-dispersed scriptoria, histories of printing and publishing and bindings and typefaces.' You could argue that all books belong in that bookcase, since they engage with their literary lineage at least as much as they do with the real world. However, 'Codex' has a better claim than most novels to a spot there — and not just because its title means, as a snooty scholar tells Edward, 'what someone like you would call a book.' 'Codex' takes its place on the shelf of self-referential, bibliophilic page turners like 'The Name of the Rose,' 'Possession' and 'A Case of Curiosities,' and it's as entertaining as any of them."
