= Decoder =

Decoder may refer to:

== Technology ==
- Audio decoder converts digital audio to analog form
- Binary decoder, digital circuits such as 1-of-N and seven-segment decoders
- Decompress (compression decoder), converts compressed data (e.g., audio/video/images) to an uncompressed form
- Instruction decoder, an electronic circuit that converts computer instructions into CPU control signals
- Quadrature decoder, converts signals from an incremental encoder into counter control signals
- Video decoder, converts base-band analog video to digital form

== Music ==
- Decoder (band), a defunct post-hardcore band that was briefly named Lead Hands
- Decoder (duo), a drum and bass duo
- Decoder (album)

== Other uses ==
- Decoder (film), a 1984 West German film

== See also ==
- Decoding methods
- Code (disambiguation)
- Recode (disambiguation)
