= Marion Ames Taggart =

American writer

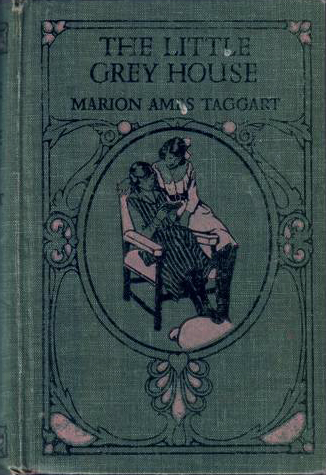
The Little Grey House, a 1904 book by Taggart

Marion Ames Taggart (1866-1945) was an American writer of verses, stories, and Catholic literature.

Taggart wrote for many secular and Catholic publications, and most of her writing was for children.

== Biography ==
Marion Ames Taggart was born in Haverhill, Massachusetts. She was descended on the mother's side from English Puritans. The Taggarts, originally MacTaggarts, came from Scotland to New Hampshire five generations earlier. Her great-grandfather, Captain Benjamin Ames, fought in the Battle of Bunker Hill. Her father was Catholic, and her mother converted to Catholicism.

Taggart was unable to attend a school due to ill health. Because she couldn't attend school, her mother provided for her education, except for languages and music.

At the age of 10, she learned more about the claims of rival religious sects and tried to discover which possessed the truth. In her teens, she began to study Catholic teaching, and was baptised in Boston.

Taggart began to write verses and stories at the age of 13. She regularly contributed to The Young Catholic while still under the age of 20. She wrote for many secular and Catholic publications, and most of her writing was for children.

She is known to have lived with her mother at Plainfield, New Jersey.

Taggart died in January of 1945, in her home in Harrisburg, Pennsylvania.

== Works ==
- The Blissylvania Post-Office (1897)
- Winnetou, The Apache Knight (1898)
- The Wyndham Girls (1902)
- Miss Lochinvar: A Story for Girls (1902)
- The Little Grey House (1904)
- The Little Women Club (1905)
- Six Girls and Bob: A Story of Patty-Pans and Green Fields (1906)
- Pussy-Cat Town (1906)
- The Daughters of the Little Grey House (1907)
- Six Girls and the Tea Room (1907)
- Six Girls Growing Older: A Story (1908)
- Six Girls and the Seventh One (1909)
- Betty Gaston, The Seventh Girl: A Story(1910)
- Six Girls and Betty: A Story (1911)
- Six Girls Grown Up: A Story (1912)
- Beth's Wonder-Winter: A Story (1914)
- Beth's Old Home(1915)
- Beth of Old Chilton (1916)
- Hollyhock House: A Story for Girls (1916)
- A Pilgrim Maid: A Story of Plymouth Colony in 1620 (1920)
- The Annes (1921)
- The Cable (1923)
