= Codebook (disambiguation) =

A codebook is a type of document used for gathering and storing codes.

Codebook may also refer to:

- CodeBook, software used in building information modeling
- The Code Book, a 1999 book by Simon Singh
- Codebook algorithm, an algorithm used in cryptography
- Codebook, a password management software by Zetetic LLC
- Codebook excited linear prediction, a speech coding algorithm
- Electronic codebook (ECB), a mode of encryption in cryptography
