= Legal coding =

Creating keywords to index legal documents

Legal coding is the process of creating summary or keyword data from a document. It is widely used in the legal profession to create a fast-search index or database of documents for use in litigation.

Objective Coding Definitions

- The recording of basic data such as date, author, or document type, from documents into a database.
- Extracting information from electronic documents such as date created, author recipient, CC and linking each image to the information in pre-defined objective fields. In direct opposition to Subjective Coding, where legal interpretations of data in a document are linked to individual documents. Also called bibliographic coding.
- Extracting such information from a document as its author, its mailing date, etc. Objective coding is usually done from the document text or image, because the metadata may be inaccurate. For example, a document written and signed by a partner might show the administrative assistant as the author in the metadata, because it was originally typed on the assistant's computer.

== Subjective coding ==
Subjective coding is the indexing of documents according to subjective data. This may be gleaned from templates, or more usually from a subjective reading by someone familiar with the topic. This is the more reliable way to determine factors such as 'importance' of the document.
