= Codec (disambiguation) =

Codec may mean:

- An audio codec converts between analog and digital representations or performs data compression.
- Codec, a hardware device or computer software used for coding and decoding transformations of data or signal media streams
- Codec, a fictional radio device used in the Metal Gear games
- A video codec is a device or software that enables video compression and/or decompression for digital video.

== See also ==
- Kodak
- Codex
