= U;Nee Code =

Studio album by U;Nee
- Released: June 12, 2003
- Recorded: 2002–2003
- Genre: K-pop; dance-pop
- Label: J'S Entertainment, DreamBeat Korea

U;Nee chronology
U;Nee Code (2003)	Call Call Call (2005)

U;Nee Code is the debut studio album by South Korean singer, U;Nee. It was released on June 12, 2003, on Synnara Music.

== Background ==
Prior to the release of U;Nee Code, U;Nee had been active as an actress under the name Lee Hye-ryeon. Composer Jo Seong-jin, whom she had known beforehand, suggested she work with him on an album, and although she initially refused, she accepted the offer after a year of persuasion. After three years spent preparing for her singing debut, her debut performance took place on June 10, 2003.

== Composition ==
U;Nee Code is primarily a dance-pop album, with tracks focused on showing off U;Nee's "excellent dance skills". The album's lead single is "Go", which was described as a "Miami rock-styled song". The track was meant to be given to a boy band until U;Nee suggested she sing it. Alongside "Go", the album features the hip-hop infused disco song "Disco Queen", the hip-hop styled ballad "Happy Together", and the pop ballad "To You".

== Track listing ==
No.	Title	Length
1.	"너의 욕망 (Your Desire)"	3:41
2.	"가 (Miami Mix)"	3:36
3.	"Disco Queen"	3:31
4.	"Sun Cruise"	3:30
5.	"To You"	4:09
6.	"Happy Together"	3:23
7.	"Trick I"	3:57
8.	"애가"	4:19
9.	"넌 딱 걸렸어 (Oh! Punch!)" (Cover of "Don't Push Me" by Sweetbox.)	3:17
10.	"Play"	3:15
11.	"Adieu"	3:25
12.	"가 (Club Mix)"	4:04
13.	"두번째 트릭 (Trick 2)"	3:25
