= Low fantasy =

Subgenre of fantasy fiction defined by a "mundane" setting

Low fantasy is a subgenre of fantasy fiction in which magical events intrude on an otherwise normal world. The term thus contrasts with high fantasy stories, which take place in fictional worlds that have their own sets of rules and physical laws.

Intrusion fantasy places less emphasis on elements typically associated with fantasy and sets a narrative in realistic environments with elements of the fantastical. Sometimes, there are just enough fantastical elements to make ambiguous the boundary between what is real and what is purely psychological or supernatural. The word "low" refers to the familiarity of the world within which fantasy elements appear and is not a remark on the work's overall quality.

An alternative definition, common in role-playing games, rests on the story and characters being more realistic than mythic in scope.

== History ==
Fantasy fiction developed out of fairy tales in the nineteenth century. Early nineteenth century scholarship in folklore led to fantasy fiction dominating Victorian children's literature. The genre diverged into the two subgenres, high and low fantasy, after the Edwardian era. Low fantasy itself diverged into further subgenres in the twentieth century. The forms of low fantasy include personified animals, personified toys (including The Indian in the Cupboard and The Doll's House; building on the earlier The Adventures of Pinocchio), comic fantasies of exaggerated character traits and altered physics (including Pippi Longstocking and The Borrowers), magical powers, supernatural elements and time slips.

French fantastic fiction is predominantly within the low fantasy genre. Low fantasy corresponds to the French genre of "le fantastique" but French literature has no tradition equivalent to English literature's high fantasy. According to David Ketterer, emeritus professor of English at Concordia University, Montreal, the French term le fantastique "refers to a specific kind of fantasy, that in which the supernatural or the bizarre intrudes into the everyday world; the closest equivalents in English would be 'low fantasy', 'dark fantasy' or 'weird fiction'. 'Le fantastique' does not cover the kind of complete secondary world creation typified by Tolkien's Lord of the Rings. There is no tradition of 'dragons and wizards' fantasy in French." Where high fantasy does occur, the terms "le merveilleux" or "le fantastique moderne" are often used.

== Critical interpretations ==
The fiction gives the author greater agency than allowed in the real world. Since being popularised in the works of E. Nesbit, the "low/portal variety" of fantasy has become a staple for its facility in challenging "established orders of society and thought." Children usually read more low fantasy than high fantasy.

The early 21st century is seeing an increase in prominence of the work of authors such as George R. R. Martin and Joe Abercrombie, whose high fantasy novels (works set entirely in fantasy worlds) have been referred to as "low fantasy" because they de-emphasize magic and non-human intelligent races in favor of a more cynical portrayal of human conflict. Fantasy writer David Chandler considered this "rise of 'Low Fantasy'" to reflect the contemporary reality of the war on terror—characterized by "secret deals", "vicious reprisals" and "sudden acts of terrifying carnage"—much as the horror genre reacted to the Vietnam War a generation earlier.

== Distinguishing between subgenres ==
High and low fantasy are distinguished as being set, respectively, in an alternative "secondary" world or in the real "primary" world. In many works, the distinction between primary or secondary world settings, and therefore whether it is low or high fantasy, can be unclear. The secondary world may take three forms, described by Nikki Gamble in her explication of three characteristics of high fantasy:

1. Primary does not exist (e.g., Dungeons & Dragons) or is irrelevant (e.g., Discworld)
2. Entered through a portal from the primary world (e.g., Alice's Adventures in Wonderland, The Chronicles of Narnia, His Dark Materials, and The Dark Tower)
3. World-within-a-world (e.g., American Gods, The Gods of Pegāna, The Magicians, and Harry Potter)

A few high fantasy series do not easily fit into Gamble's categories. For example, J. R. R. Tolkien's The Lord of the Rings is set in the primary world of Earth in the ancient past, (Note: Letters 151, 165, 183, 211, Letters 325, 17 July 1971, Letters 328 Autumn 1971) and Tolkien adamantly disagreed with anyone who thought otherwise. (Note: Letters 211, "...steed of the Witch-King...its description even provides a sort of way in which it could be a last survivor of older geological eras.", "...it would be difficult to fit the lands and events (or 'cultures') into such evidence as we possess, archaeological or geological, concerning the nearer or remoter part of what is now Europe; though the Shire, for instance, is expressly stated to have been in this region (I p. 12).", "Arda 'realm' was the name given to our world or earth......I hope the, evidently long but undefined gap* in time between the Fall of Barad-dur and our Days is sufficient for 'literary credibility', even for readers acquainted with what is known as 'pre-history'. I have, I suppose, constructed an imaginary time, but kept my feet on my own mother-earth for place. I prefer that to the contemporary mode of seeking remote globes in 'space'. However curious, they are alien, and not loveable with the love of blood-kin. Middle-Earth is... not my own invention, It is a modernization or alteration...of an old word for inhabited world of Man, the oikoumene: middle because thought vaguely as set admidst [sic?] the encircling Seas and (in the northern-imagination) between the ice of the North and the fire of the South. O. English middan-geard, mideavil E. midden-erd, middle-erd. Many reviewers seem to assume Middle-earth is another planet! *I imagine the gap to be about 6000 years: that is we are now at the end of the Fifth Age, if the Ages were of about the same length as S.A. and T.A. But they have, I think quickened; and I imagine we are actually at the end of the Sixth Age, or in the Seventh.", The Letters of J.R.R Tolkien, pg 282, 283) According to Tolkien, he had set it in the inhabited lands of geographically north-west Europe. (Note: Letters 294: "...Middle Earth. This is an old word not invented by me, as a reference to a dictionary such as the Shorter Oxford will show. It is meant to be the inhabitable lands of our world, set amid the surrounding Ocean. The actions of the story take place in the North-west of 'middle-earth', equivalent in latitude to the coastlands of Europe and the north shores of the Mediterranean...Hobbiton and Rivendell are taken (as intended) to be about the latitude of Oxford, the Minas Tirith, 600 miles south, is about the latitude of Florence. The mouths of Anduin, and the ancient city of Pelargir are about the latitude of ancient Troy.", Letters, pg 375,376) Tolkien himself disagreed with the notion that his stories diverged from reality, but rather defended his position that the "essentials of that abiding place are all there (at any rate for inhabitants of N.W. Europe), so naturally it feels familiar, even if a little glorified by enchantment of distance in time." (Note: Letters 210: "The Lord of the Rings may be a 'fairy-story', but it takes place in the Northern hemisphere of this earth: miles are miles, days are days, and weather is weather." Letters pg 272) (Note: Letters 151: "Middle-earth is just archaic english...the inhabited world of man. It lay then as it does. In fact just as it does, round and inescapable. That is partly the point. The new situation, established at the end of the Third Age, leads on eventually and inevitably to ordinary History, and we see here the process culminating. If you or I or any of the mortal men (or hobbits) of Frodo's day had set out over sea, west, we should, as now, eventually have come back (as now) to our starting point..."Letters of JRR Tolkien, pg 186) (Note: Letters 165: "'Middle-earth' by the way, is not a name of a never-never land without relation to the world we live in (like Mercury or Edison). It is just a use of Middle English middel-erde (or erthe) altered from Old English Middengeard: the name for the inhabited lands of Men 'between the seas'. And though I have not attempted to relate the shape of the mountains and land-masses to what geologists may say or surmise about the nearer past, imaginatively this 'history' is supposed to take place in a period of the actual Old World of this planet.", Letters, pg 220) (Note: Letters 183: "I am historically minded. Middle-earth is not an imaginary world. The name is the modern form (appearing in the 13th century) of midden-erd>middel-erd, an ancient name for the oikoumene, the abiding place of Men, the objectively real world, in use specifically opposed to imaginary worlds (as Fairyland) or unseen worlds (as Heaven or Hell). The theatre of my tale is this earth, the one in which we now live, but the historical period is imaginary. The essentials of that abiding place are all there (at any rate for inhabitants of N.W. Europe), so naturally it feels familiar, even if a little glorified by enchantment of distance in time., Letters pg. 239") Nevertheless, Middle-earth is sufficiently divergent from reality to be classed as a secondary world and hence high fantasy. J. K. Rowling's Harry Potter series is again set in the real world; however, while the primary setting, mostly the school, Hogwarts, is said to be located somewhere in Scotland, it is physically separated from the real world and becomes a "world-within-a-world". Similarly, Philip Pullman's His Dark Materials is largely set in an alternate Oxfordshire, a real location, but the fact that it is an alternate world at all places it in the high fantasy subgenre.

Some sources place Harry Potter and His Dark Materials in the low fantasy genre. Karin E. Westman, writing in The Oxford Handbook of Children's Literature states that because "[J. K.] Rowling is much more interested in how fantasy provides perspective on everyday experience and the individual's place in society," and her inclusion of bildungsroman (a coming-of-age story) and the school story genres, "align her primarily with the domestic (or low) fantasy of authors such as E. Nesbit, Elizabeth Goudge, and Paul Gallico...as well as authors like Philip Pullman and Jonathan Stroud, who are also interested in the intersection of the personal and the political within quotidian experiences."

Low fantasy is related to a number of other genres or subgenres.

- Urban fantasy takes place in a modern urban as opposed to rural or historical setting, and thus can be viewed as a type of low fantasy.
- Dark fantasy uses fantasy to create a sense of horror or dread. Since it often has a real-world setting, there is an overlap with low fantasy.
- Paranormal romance, of which the best-known variety is the vampire romance, is nearly always low fantasy.
- Superhero fiction may count as low fantasy if the hero's powers have a supernatural rather than a scientific (or pseudoscientific) explanation.
- Magical realism has a largely realistic view of the world but introduces supernatural elements. While authors such as Gene Wolfe and Terry Pratchett regard it as fantasy, it has been claimed as a different genre on the grounds that in magical realism the supernatural events are usually included in the worldview of the human characters while in low fantasy they usually violate it.

== Role-playing games ==
For their own purposes role-playing games sometimes use a different definition of low fantasy. GURPS Fantasy defines the genre as "closer to realistic fiction than to myth. Low Fantasy stories focus on people's daily lives and practical goals ... A Low Fantasy campaign asks what it's like to live in a world of monsters, magic, and demigods." The book acknowledges the literary definition of the genre with "some critics define 'low fantasy' as any fantasy story set in the real world. However, a real world setting can include the kind of mythic elements this book classifies as high fantasy."

== Examples ==
- The Borrowers by Mary Norton
- The Dark Is Rising by Susan Cooper
- The Doll's House by Rumer Godden
- Five Children and It by E. Nesbit
- Good Omens by Neil Gaiman and Terry Pratchett
- Magic, Inc. by Robert A. Heinlein
- The Indian in the Cupboard by Lynne Reid Banks
- The Snow Spider by Jenny Nimmo
- That Hideous Strength by C. S. Lewis
- Tuck Everlasting by Natalie Babbitt

== See also ==
- Contemporary fantasy
- Occult detective fiction
