= List of The Magicians (American TV series) episodes =

2015 fantasy TV series episode list

The Magicians is an American fantasy television series that aired on Syfy and is based on the novel of the same name by Lev Grossman. Michael London, Janice Williams, John McNamara, and Sera Gamble served as executive producers. A 13-episode order was placed for the first season in May 2015, and the series premiered on December 16, 2015, as a special preview.

During the course of the series, 65 episodes of The Magicians aired over five seasons, between December 16, 2015, and April 1, 2020.

== Series overview ==
| Season | Episodes | Originally released | |
| Season | Episodes | First released | Last released |
|---|---|---|---|
| 1 | 13 | December 16, 2015 | April 11, 2016 |
| 2 | 13 | January 25, 2017 | April 19, 2017 |
| 3 | 13 | January 10, 2018 | April 4, 2018 |
| 4 | 13 | January 23, 2019 | April 17, 2019 |
| 5 | 13 | January 15, 2020 | April 1, 2020 |

== Episodes ==
=== Season 1 (2015–16) ===
| No. overall | No. in season | Title | Directed by | Written by | Original release date | U.S. viewers (millions) |
|---|---|---|---|---|---|---|
| 1 | 1 | "Unauthorized Magic" | Mike Cahill | Sera Gamble & John McNamara | December 16, 2015 (Note: Special preview airdate before the official premiere.) | 0.92 |
| 1 | 1 | "Unauthorized Magic" | Mike Cahill | Sera Gamble & John McNamara | January 25, 2016 | 1.06 |
Quentin and Julia are invited to a test of their magical talent. Quentin passes and is accepted to Brakebills University. Julia fails the test and they attempt to wipe her memory about Brakebills and the test, but she leaves herself a clue to remember. Refusing to accept that she cannot learn magic, she is later contacted by Pete, who offers to teach her. In his dreams, Quentin meets Jane Chatwin from the Fillory and Further novels, who warns him about the Beast and leaves him with a sigil burned into his hand. Alice recognizes the sigil and sees it as an opportunity to know how her brother died. She, Quentin, Penny and Kady try to contact her dead brother, Charlie. Instead they accidentally summon the Beast who appears in the school the next day, attacking a teacher and the dean.
| 2 | 2 | "The Source of Magic" | Scott Smith | Sera Gamble | January 25, 2016 | 1.11 |
Professor Sunderland investigates the Beast incident at Brakebills and Quentin, Alice, Penny, and Kady face disciplinary action for their involvement in the Beast's attack. But Eliza, who is called in as specialist, lets them go on probation. Julia meets Marina when she has to pass a test to join the hedge witches. Kady is secretly working for Marina.
| 3 | 3 | "Consequences of Advanced Spellcasting" | Scott Smith | Henry Alonso Myers | February 1, 2016 | 0.90 |
Alice and Quentin find out that her brother, Charlie, was consumed by magic and turned into a niffin five years ago. When they find him, he attacks Alice and Quentin. Quentin binds him, despite Alice's belief that she can get through to him. Devastated about what happened to her brother, Alice leaves Brakebills. Julia struggles to balance learning magic with maintaining her previous life. Eliot searches for the book that Kady stole for Marina, which leads him and Quentin to Marina's hedge witches safe house, where Quentin finds and confronts Julia. Penny, after being assigned incorrectly to the psychic discipline, discovers he is a "traveler", who has the ability to teleport anywhere, even between worlds.
| 4 | 4 | "The World in the Walls" | James L. Conway | John McNamara | February 8, 2016 | 0.75 |
Quentin wakes up in the mental hospital to which he admitted himself in the first episode, where his memories of Brakebills and magic are treated as delusions. It is revealed that Julia and Marina made Quentin's elaborate hallucination, and the only way to get him out involves summoning a demon bug. Dean Fogg lowers the Brakebills school's security spell, allowing Marina and Julia to sneak in and steal Marina's memories of her time at Brakebills. Quentin escapes the hallucination with the help of Penny and his visions of Jane Chatwin. Marina, after being reunited with her memories, cuts off Julia from her hedge witch safe house because Julia tried to help Dean Fogg save Quentin.
| 5 | 5 | "Mendings, Major and Minor" | Bill Eagles | David Reed | February 15, 2016 | 0.75 |
Quentin visits home after finding out that his father has been diagnosed with brain cancer. He struggles with accepting that magic cannot save his father, and eventually opens up to his father about magic. After being cut off by Marina, Julia tries to find other hedge witch safe houses in New York with the help of Pete, but nobody else has nearly as many spells. Marina erases James' memory of Julia to prevent her from telling him about magic. Alice returns to Brakebills and Eliot and Margo try to use her connections to get a mentor. Penny practices astral projection and discovers a woman, Victoria, chained in a dungeon by the Beast. Based on the crest on the doors, Quentin surmises that Penny has traveled to Fillory.
| 6 | 6 | "Impractical Applications" | John Stuart Scott | Leah Fong | February 22, 2016 | 0.65 |
The first-years must pass a set of challenges called "the trials" devised by the third years. While doing the trials, Quentin and Penny reconcile, Alice and Quentin share secrets and Kady confesses to Penny that she is using him to steal things from Brakebills. As each of the first years passes the trials, they each turn into a goose. Meanwhile, in an attempt to steal spells from Marina, Julia teams up with an older hedge witch who also has connections with Marina. The older hedge witch turns out to be Kady's mother and dies in the process of stealing the cabinet of spells from Marina's safe house. Kady had been working for Marina in payment of a debt related to her mother. Kady does not know yet that her mother died.
| 7 | 7 | "The Mayakovsky Circumstance" | Guy Norman Bee | Story by : Mike Moore; Teleplay by : John McNamara | February 29, 2016 | 0.70 |
While in the form of geese, Quentin and his peers fly to Brakebills South Antarctica to study with Professor Mayakovsky, who puts them through several challenges. Eliot and Margo prepare to travel to Ibiza; with the help of newly-met Todd and Mike, they summon a Djinn as a gift for the organizers of the party. When Eliot starts sleeping with Mike, he chooses to stay behind and Margo takes Todd. Julia's sister picks her up from the police station following the death of Kady's mother, and insists on helping Julia to avoid their mother from knowing what happened. Mayakovsky maneuvers Alice and Quentin into a relationship. He also tells Kady that her mother died and she is no longer welcome at Brakebills, encouraging her to immediately leave and not to go back to the main school lest they take her memories of her time at the school.
| 8 | 8 | "The Strangled Heart" | Jan Eliasberg | David Reed | March 7, 2016 | 0.67 |
Eliot and Mike grow closer, while Quentin and Alice spend time apart to make assessments about their feelings for each other. Mike, while attacking Quentin, stabs Penny with a cursed blade. Recognizing a similar event in the Fillory and Further books, Quentin and Alice are able to save him. Mike, having been under the Beast's control, pretends to remember nothing until Eliza confronts him, at which point he recognizes her as Jane Chatwin and kills her. He also attempts to attack Dean Fogg but before doing so he is killed by Eliot. In rehab, Julia meets a counselor named Richard who was trained at Brakebills and introduces her to religious magic.
| 9 | 9 | "The Writing Room" | James L. Conway | Sera Gamble | March 14, 2016 | 0.71 |
Quentin discovers that Penny destroyed the manuscript given to him by Eliza in the first episode. Penny relates that it is a book about Fillory written by Jane Chatwin and not by Christopher Plover, in which Jane wanted to clarify the discrepancies. Quentin, Penny, Alice, and Eliot travel to the Plover estate to search for the button which, according to Jane's book, is a key to the door to Fillory. They find that the mansion is haunted by the ghosts of Plover's housekeeper's children, whom Plover's sister had drugged and killed to prevent them from disturbing Plover's work. Quentin discovers that Plover was learning magic and was molesting Martin Chatwin. Plover disappeared, rather than dying, leading Quentin to believe that he is the Beast. The four of them find the button with the children's corpses. Meanwhile, Julia helps Richard by entering the mind of a paralyzed mute woman.
| 10 | 10 | "Homecoming" | Joshua Butler | Henry Alonso Myers | March 21, 2016 | 0.78 |
Penny has been trapped in the Neitherlands, the space between other worlds. He contacts Quentin and discovers that, while it's only been 6 hours for him, it's been 6 weeks back on Earth. To help Penny, Alice and Quentin travel to her parents' house to ask for help from a family friend, who is also a Traveler. Penny meets a librarian in the Neitherlands who gives him information about how to fight the Beast. Quentin and Alice must resolve relationship issues to be able to cast a beacon spell which will help Penny find his way back to Earth. Eliot and Margo discover that an ex-boyfriend of hers had constructed a living golem in her image. Julia hosts other magicians whom she knows through Richard, including Kady. Julia and Kady together learn some spells before joining their friends on a project, and then Richard explains to them that they are trying to summon a god to provide them with enough magical power to rewrite the past.
| 11 | 11 | "Remedial Battle Magic" | Amanda Tapping | Leah Fong | March 28, 2016 | 0.72 |
Quentin, Alice, Penny, Eliot and Margo use probability magic to determine their best chance to kill the Beast and survive; the only option that doesn't end in all of them dead is for them to travel to Fillory to kill the Beast. Because of time constraints, they prepare by learning the dangerous battle magic used by hedge witches. The Beast is driving Penny and other Travelers insane, leading some of them to kill themselves, including Penny's mentor Stanley. Penny uses drugs to try blocking out the Beast's voice, leading to an overdose. Professor Pearl Sunderland helps him shut the voices out. Mastering the battle spells leaves Quentin, Eliot, and Margo emotionally high and disoriented. Quentin has sex with Margo and Eliot, and when he wakes up he finds Alice at the foot of the bed. Kady and Julia search for clues to help them summon a god, and someone visits Julia in her dreams.
| 12 | 12 | "Thirty-Nine Graves" | Guy Norman Bee | Leah Fong & Henry Alonso Myers | April 4, 2016 | 0.75 |
Alice and Quentin fight following his infidelity, and she sleeps with Penny as revenge. Quentin, Alice, Penny, Eliot, and Margo travel to the Neitherlands, where they are ambushed and Quentin falls back to Earth. The others hide in the Neitherland's library, until Eliot burns a book and gets them kicked out. They find Josh Hoberman, one of the missing class students from Brakebills. Two years ago, he and a classmate – a Traveler named Victoria – led most of their class to Fillory. Meanwhile on Earth, Quentin talks to Dean Fogg, who reveals that Eliza is Jane Chatwin. She had been using an enchanted watch, given to her by a god named Ember, to create a time loop so she can try different methods of killing the Beast. After 39 failures, in which Quentin always died, she changed the starting circumstances by having Julia rejected from Brakebills so that she would learn magic by herself. Quentin reconciles with Julia to tell her the truth. Together, they find their way into Fillory by traveling back to 1942 and following young Jane Chatwin through a door to Fillory.
| 13 | 13 | "Have You Brought Me Little Cakes?" | Scott Smith | Sera Gamble & John McNamara & David Reed | April 11, 2016 | 0.68 |
Julia and Quentin travel to 1942 Fillory but are followed by Martin Chatwin, whom they promise to help find Jane. They commission a blade to kill the Beast and meet the Watcherwoman, a future Jane Chatwin, who sends them to the present and to Penny, Eliot and Margo. To collect the blade, Eliot has to marry the blade-maker's daughter, Fen, as he is revealed to be the High King. Quentin and Julia ask Ember to give them enough power to hold the blade, but Quentin decides that Alice should wield it instead of him. Ember unlocks Julia's memories, revealing that she and her friends had been duped into summoning a trickster god called Reynard the Fox, who raped Julia and killed her friends. Penny, Alice, Eliot and Margo rescue the Beast's prisoners, Victoria and Christopher Plover, who reveal that the Beast is Martin Chatwin. While Josh and Victoria return to Earth, the rest travel to the source of Fillory's magic, the Wellspring, to ambush the Beast. There, the Beast kills them all except Quentin and Julia, who uses the blade to make a deal with the Beast to kill Reynard.

=== Season 2 (2017) ===
| No. overall | No. in season | Title | Directed by | Written by | Original release date | U.S. viewers (millions) |
|---|---|---|---|---|---|---|
| 14 | 1 | "Knight of Crowns" | Chris Fisher | Sera Gamble | January 25, 2017 | 1.29 |
Quentin flees the Wellspring seeking help and comes across a witch in a gingerbread house, who agrees to help at the cost of a vial of his blood. Alice emerges from the Wellspring, explaining that she still has the power of a god, and has already patched up her companions. They discover the Beast has drained the Wellspring. Penny uses a magic river to restore his injured hands, but offends the keeper of the river who curses them. The companions meet the Knight of Crowns, Eliot and Quentin are crowned Kings and Alice and Margo Queens of Fillory, but they soon discover the kingdom is in a severe state of decline.
| 15 | 2 | "Hotel Spa Potions" | Chris Fisher | John McNamara | February 1, 2017 | 0.94 |
Quentin, Alice, Penny, and Margo return to Brakebills seeking magic to use against the Beast. With Dean Fogg's help, their search leads them to Bigby, a former Brakebills professor, who teaches Alice a powerful battle magic spell. Dean Fogg implants Cacodemons into the foursome to give them an additional weapon against the Beast. Professor Sunderland lifts the curse on Penny's hands. Learning Fillory is suffering from famine due to the Beast's misuse of the Wellspring, Elliot is forced to teach the Fillorian people agriculture using only tools and fertilizer. Julia reveals to Quentin that the Beast has cursed the Fillorian monarchs. Reynard murders more witches, prompting Marina to team up with Julia and the Beast to kill him.
| 16 | 3 | "Divine Elimination" | John Scott | Henry Alonso Myers | February 8, 2017 | 0.91 |
The Beast's curse forces Quentin, Alice, Eliot, and Margo to all kill each other. Penny circumvents it by killing them with poison, then reviving them with adrenaline. Marina performs a ritual to summon Reynard. When Julia and the Beast arrive to trap him, Penny teleports them to Fillory so Alice can destroy the Beast. Julia's interference causes Alice's attack to miss and the Beast is only wounded. Quentin and Alice attempt to intercept the Beast before he can heal himself at the Wellspring. Ember confronts the Beast and tells him he has defecated in the Wellspring, rendering it useless. Penny teleports Julia back to Earth and she removes Professor Sunderland's chains from his wrists, causing the curse to return. The Beast injures Quentin and battles Alice, who gains the upper hand until she begins to lose the godly power from Ember's essence. She casts the Rhinemann Ultra anyway and transforms into a Niffin. Niffin Alice kills the Beast and turns on Eliot and Margo. Quentin releases his Cacodemon to kill the Niffin. Julia returns to find Marina's lifeless corpse and Reynard gone.
| 17 | 4 | "The Flying Forest" | Carol Banker | David Reed | February 15, 2017 | 0.78 |
Magic on Earth and Fillory begins to fail due to the polluted Wellspring. So that Eliot can return to Earth, Margo makes a golem into which he can project his mind. Eliot soon finds his consciousness split between the golem on Earth and his own body on Fillory. Dean Fogg tells him he must choose between life on Fillory and life on Earth. Centaur physicians heal Quentin's wounds and tell Penny they cannot cure his cursed hands. Quentin amputates Penny's hands, and together they enter the Flying Forest to hunt the White Lady, a magical creature who grants wishes, in order to ask her to heal Penny's hands and resurrect Alice. Julia and Kady follow a message on Marina's body to find a spell that temporarily revives Marina; she tells them to locate a girl who banished Reynard from Earth forty years ago. Quentin and Penny find the White Lady; she restores Penny's hands but tells Quentin she cannot raise the dead. She asks him whether he wants her to erase his memories of Alice, but he refuses, wishing to be sent home.
| 18 | 5 | "Cheat Day" | Joshua Butler | Mike Moore | February 22, 2017 | 0.88 |
Quentin abandons magic for a corporate job in the non-magical world. Emily, a former Brakebills student who quit magic after a disastrous affair with a professor, befriends Quentin. Penny is unable to perform magic with his hands and returns to Mayakovsky for help. It is revealed Mayakovsky was Emily's lover, and was banished to Antarctica as a result. Quentin and Emily get drunk and use illusion magic to disguise themselves as Mayakovsky and Alice respectively, and they have a one-night stand. Julia learns she is pregnant by Reynard and attempts to terminate the pregnancy; however, the fetus protects itself by magically compelling Julia's doctor to commit suicide. Eliot learns Fen is pregnant and survives an assassination attempt by Baelor, a member of Fillorians United, an organization dedicated to driving out Earthlings from Fillory. Against Margo's objections, Eliot spares Baelor's life and asks his advice on how to govern Fillory. It is revealed Fen is a member of Fillorians United sent to infiltrate Eliot's court.
| 19 | 6 | "The Cock Barrens" | Kate Woods | Noga Landau | March 1, 2017 | 0.78 |
Quentin begins seeing apparitions of Alice. With her guidance, he persuades Alice's parents to help him cast a spell to lay her soul to rest. Niffin Alice then appears in the flesh, revealing the Cacodemon did not kill her but imprisoned her in Quentin's body; she appeared as an apparition to torment him and Alice's parents, and maliciously promises that she and Quentin will have "so much fun" together. Prince Ess of the Kingdom of Loria, whose kingdom is failing, visits Eliot and Margo with a proposal to share the Wellspring's magic and marry Margo. When Margo refuses, Ess teleports the Fillorian castle to Loria. Julia is imprisoned by Dana, the woman who banished Reynard. Dana tells her she must bear Reynard's child, as he can only be banished using the magical energy generated by the child's birth. Kady rescues Julia. Margo seduces Ess and ends up agreeing to marry him. Penny Travels throughout Loria searching for the castle. When he cannot find it, he realizes Ess actually disguised its original location magically and created the illusion that Loria was dying. Margo declares war on Loria in response to Ess's deception.
| 20 | 7 | "Plan B" | Chris Fisher | Christina Strain | March 8, 2017 | 0.63 |
Quentin begins researching how to turn Niffin Alice back into a human. Julia requires a million dollars to hire exorcists to terminate her pregnancy, and Eliot and Margo realize that Fillory is bankrupt; in order to get the needed funds, the three of them team up with Quentin, Kady, and Penny to rob a magically protected bank. During the robbery, Penny is trapped inside the bank vault, and Quentin is forced to allow Niffin Alice to possess his body for 30 minutes every day in exchange for her help freeing Penny, and Eliot's golem is killed, causing the real Eliot to convulse with seizures. Julia's exorcism is successful, but Kady tells her there were complications.
| 21 | 8 | "Word as Bond" | James L. Conway | Sera Gamble | March 15, 2017 | 0.71 |
Julia's exorcism has removed her Shade (soul), leaving her amoral, reckless, and emotionally detached. Quentin tries to figure out what Niffin Alice is doing when in control of his body. Eventually she takes him to summon a Niffin priest who has the secret of escaping Niffin traps. The priest refuses to teach Niffin Alice the secret until she frees herself from Quentin, and she tells Quentin that his body cannot withstand the stress of containing her. Margo and Julia negotiate with a Dryad for the right to move Fillorian troops through a sentient forest. The Dryad is insulted that Eliot (who is in a coma) has sent women in his place and refuses. Later Julia returns to the Dryad with a booby-trapped offer of tribute, which destroys the forest. This enrages all sentient plants on Fillory and Margo has Julia imprisoned. Quentin, Penny, and Kady attempt to identify Dana's son by Reynard, hoping to use his power to banish Reynard; however his identity is kept secret by Dana's spells. Penny signs a contract of permanent servitude with the Neitherlands Librarians in exchange for a book containing Dana's son's name. Penny reads Quentin's mind and learns Niffin Alice is trapped within.
| 22 | 9 | "Lesser Evils" | Rebecca Johnson | Elle Lipson & John McNamara | March 22, 2017 | 0.61 |
After the Fillorian army deserts due to Julia's actions, Eliot fights Lorian King Idri in a one-on-one duel to end the war. Fen gives him an enchanted sword to improve his chances of victory. Penny and Kady break Julia free. Together they kidnap Reynard's son, Senator John Gaines, and take him to Brakebills. Reynard enters Brakebills searching for Gaines. Julia sacrifices Quentin to Reynard, planning to coerce him into releasing Niffin Alice to kill Reynard; however the plan fails. Gaines surrenders himself to Reynard, and they leave together. During Eliot's duel, the Wellspring fails, causing the enchanted sword to also fail. To save Eliot, Margo makes a deal with the fairies to restore the Wellspring in exchange for Eliot and Fen's child, without Fen's knowledge. Eliot returns, announcing he has ended the war by agreeing to marry Idri and share the Wellspring with Loria. Kady, appalled at Julia's actions, has her imprisoned. Quentin frees Niffin Alice.
| 23 | 10 | "The Girl Who Told Time" | Joshua Butler | Noga Landau & Henry Alonso Myers | March 29, 2017 | 0.72 |
Quentin encounters Julia's Shade in a vision. Depressed by his low approval ratings among the populace, Eliot learns Fillorians United are plotting to assassinate him during his wedding. He sends Josh to Fillorians United headquarters to dose them with a potion that makes them adore him. Fen is kidnapped by the Fairies. To learn more about Shades, Dean Fogg and Julia cast a spell allowing Quentin to speak with an Alice from an alternate timeline who obsessively researched Shades. Alternate Alice tells Quentin that Shades reside in the Underworld, and that Ancient Ones control access to the Underworld. Julia discovers that the Ancient Ones are dragons. Kady unsuccessfully searches the Neitherlands Library for a spell to kill a god. Penny begins his job with the Librarians by recovering an overdue book from a Magician named Harriet. Harriet's curse forces one of the Librarians to kill himself to protect the Poison Room, a storehouse for books with forbidden knowledge. Harriet leaves Kady a message that the Poison Room has a book with a god-killing spell.
| 24 | 11 | "The Rattening" | James L. Conway | Mike Moore | April 5, 2017 | 0.65 |
Quentin and Julia give an Ancient One the key to Fillory to access the Underworld. Gaines is disgusted by his powers of mind control and allies with Kady against Reynard. Penny tries to read the book of the Head Librarian's life to learn how to enter the Poison Room, but finds the book itself is stored in the Poison Room. Another Librarian, Sylvia, volunteers to help him break into the Poison Room. In Whitespire, people, including King Idri, are mysteriously transforming into rats. While trying to discover the cause, Eliot learns about the deal Margo made with the Fairies, and has her imprisoned. With the help of a potion, Margo teleports to the Fairy Realm to search for Fen. Eliot suddenly finds himself back on Earth and surmises Fillory has ejected him. Quentin and Julia meet the dead Richard, who helps them locate the area inhabited by the Shades. They are reunited with Julia's Shade and, unexpectedly, Alice's as well. They escape the Underworld, Julia deciding at the last minute to bring Alice's Shade with them instead of her own.
| 25 | 12 | "Ramifications" | Chris Fisher | David Reed & Christina Strain | April 12, 2017 | 0.67 |
Quentin, Julia, and Mayakovsky resurrect Alice using her Shade, however she feels imprisoned remembering the freedom of being a Niffin. In Eliot and Margo's absence, Josh becomes High King of Fillory. Margo appears to him in a vision and demands that he find a way to bring her back from the Fairy Realm. Furious over his father's disappearance, Ess attacks Josh; after subduing Ess and his men, Josh travels to the Fairy Realm himself. Quentin and Eliot search for a clock that is a permanent portal to Fillory. They discover the clock's owner is Umber in disguise. Umber tells them Fillory cannot be saved, but gives them the clock. Penny and Sylvia retrieve the book with the god-killing spell from the Poison Room, at the cost of her life. Gaines compels Kady to sacrifice him and collect his magical energy so that they can destroy Reynard. Julia and Kady summon Reynard, but before Julia can kill him, Persephone appears and pleads with her not to harm her son—Reynard. Julia spares him and Persephone gives her Shade in gratitude.
| 26 | 13 | "We Have Brought You Little Cakes" | Chris Fisher | Sera Gamble & John McNamara | April 19, 2017 | 0.67 |
Ember is bored of Fillory and intends to destroy it. Penny is dying of cancer from radiation poisoning, but works on an emergency case for the Library. Alice tries to adjust to her new reality with Quentin. Eliot wants Julia's help for the Ember situation. Margo and Josh meet the Fairy Queen, and she gives them a plant that can be baked into little cakes for Ember. She sends both of them back to Fillory at the cost of Margo's eye. The cakes attract Ember. Eliot and Margo try to convince him not to destroy Fillory. Meanwhile, Quentin visits Umber and they enter Umber's pocket world called Cuba. Julia releases Umber and Quentin out of Cuba to Fillory. Realizing that he was betrayed by his own brother, Ember kills Umber. Julia channels Umber's essence into a sword then Quentin uses it to kill Ember, which causes the Old Gods to shut down magic. Two months later, Alice is warned by Joseph that the Lamprey is coming for her. Fen returns from the fairy realm to warn Margo and Eliot that the Faeries are invading Fillory. Julia mysteriously still has magic.

=== Season 3 (2018) ===
| No. overall | No. in season | Title | Directed by | Written by | Original release date | U.S. viewers (millions) |
|---|---|---|---|---|---|---|
| 27 | 1 | "The Tales of the Seven Keys" | Chris Fisher | Sera Gamble | January 10, 2018 | 0.78 |
Quentin tries to find someone who can return magic, which results in finding a book called The Tales of The Seven Keys. Julia begins to explore her small but significant gift. Josh introduces Julia and Quentin to the god Bacchus. The gang is given a quest from The Great Cock for the Seven Golden Keys, which can bring back magic. Eliot and Margo struggle under the control of the fairy and realize that Margo's false eye is the fairy queen's spy. Kady is trying to find a way to heal Penny.
| 28 | 2 | "Heroes and Morons" | Chris Fisher | John McNamara | January 17, 2018 | 0.76 |
Eliot and Fen travel in a sentient boat, the Muntjac, to retrieve the first key from After Island. They are accompanied by their now-grown child, Fray, who is a spy for the Fairy Queen. The island's priest refuses to surrender the key, claiming he needs it to protect the islanders from a deadly monster. With Fray and Fen's help, Eliot reveals the priest is killing the islanders himself and blaming their deaths on an illusion of a monster he conjured with the key in order to remain in power. He and his family depart with the key, leaving the priest to the vengeful islanders. Looking for Mayakovsky, Quentin, Julia, Kady, Josh, and Alice follow a trail of chaotic magic, finding a suicidal, jilted Professor Lipson used Mayakovsky's batteries to perform magic to bring joy to people's lives. Alice flees the group when she realizes the Lamprey is nearby. Quentin deduces that Mayakovsky's lover Emily has the remaining battery, but Kady steals it before he can get it. The Lamprey later possesses Quentin.
| 29 | 3 | "The Losses of Magic" | James L. Conway | Henry Alonso Myers | January 24, 2018 | 0.61 |
Alice tries to warn her parents about the Lamprey. Quentin arrives and Alice realizes the Lamprey is inside him, but it leaves his body. While they attempt to find the creature, Alice reveals the Lamprey is after her because she tortured its family when she was a Niffin. Eventually she deduces the Lamprey is possessing her father; she electrocutes him to kill it, however the shock kills her father too. When the Muntjac is boarded by pirates, Eliot and his family escape with the key's magic. Margo negotiates with the pirates and learns their boat wants to mate with the Muntjac. Rather than force the Muntjac to comply, Margo asks if it would do so willingly. Impressed by Margo's compassion, the Fairy Queen kills the pirates. Margo tells the Queen she knows she was spying on them with her eye, and destroys the eye in defiance. Using Mayakovsky's battery, Kady and Julia summon a demon to cure Penny's cancer, but the attempt fails and Penny's body dies; however, his disembodied astral self remains alive.
| 30 | 4 | "Be the Penny" | Shannon Kohli | David Reed | January 31, 2018 | 0.67 |
Unable to interact with the physical world, a disembodied Penny watches his friends' reaction to his supposed death. With the help of Hyman Cooper, a similarly disembodied Traveler, he learns to control physical objects, but his attempts to alert the others that he is alive still fail. Julia's magical powers grow stronger. Kady, now suicidal, is faced with the choice of letting the Librarians' creature consume Penny's body or burning it so his spirit can travel to the Underworld. When she is unable to decide, Penny intervenes and incinerates his own body. Quentin and Julia's search for the second key leads them to Irene McAllister's home, and Julia successfully steals it. Brakebills's board of directors closes the school. Eliot and his family return to Brakebills from the Neitherlands, having survived an attack by cannibals. While under the influence of the key's power to reveal hidden truths, Eliot sees Penny's astral self.
| 31 | 5 | "A Life in the Day" | John Scott | Mike Moore | February 7, 2018 | 0.80 |
With the key's power, Kady is able to communicate with Penny, however the two argue angrily. The Fairy Queen forces Margo to marry Prince Mica of the Floating Mountain. Mica's immature younger brother, Prince Fomar, assassinates Mica during the wedding ceremony, and Margo is forced to marry him instead. Quentin and Eliot travel in time to Fillory's past to attempt a seemingly impossible puzzle which will reveal the third key. They spend a lifetime trying to solve the puzzle, raising a family together. After Eliot dies, Quentin finally solves the puzzle but gives the key to young Jane Chatwin, who needs it to fight the Beast. Quentin sends a message to Margo in the present, explaining what happened; Margo obtains the key's location from the adult Jane Chatwin, who remains alive in the timeless Clock Barrens, and returns with the key just before Quentin and Eliot are about to travel to the past, erasing the timeline where they lived together solving the puzzle. Julia is horrified when Persephone tells her her magic was Reynard's, which Persephone took and gave to Julia. Quentin and Eliot return to Fillory with Margo, and the taste of fruit brings back the memory of the life they lived during the now-erased timeline.
| 32 | 6 | "Do You Like Teeth?" | Carol Banker | Noga Landau | February 14, 2018 | 0.67 |
Wishing to be rid of Reynard's power, Julia transfers her magic to Alice. When the Fairy Queen demands Margo consummate her marriage, Eliot helps Margo trick Fomar into thinking the two have been intimate. Margo and Eliot discover the Fairies are planting Fairy eggs all around Fillory, and take several of the eggs as hostages. Quentin sails into the Abyss searching for the fourth key. He encounters Poppy Kline, a Brakebills researcher, who gives him the key. He discovers the key creates a doppelgänger of him within his own mind, which incessantly assaults him with his worst thoughts about himself, making him near-suicidal. After a struggle with Poppy, Benedict ends up holding the key, and is eaten by a dragon. Poppy tells Quentin that dragons are portals to the Underworld, so the key must be there. Alice tries using magic to build Penny a new body, but starts having seizures.
| 33 | 7 | "Poached Eggs" | Joshua Butler | Elle Lipson | February 21, 2018 | 0.64 |
Margo and Eliot try to blackmail the Fairy Queen into making the Fairies visible to all Fillorians, using the Fairy eggs as hostages. When the Queen threatens to harm Fray if the eggs are not returned, Fray reveals she is not Eliot and Fen's daughter. Julia's magic is slowly killing Alice. In order to cure her, Julia is forced to ask Irene McAllister for a mysterious powder that temporarily grants magical power. Quentin, Penny, and Poppy break Kady out of a mental hospital so she can enlist Harriet's help in retrieving the fourth key from the Underworld. Julia and Alice get into a fight when the latter tries to become a vampire in order to prevent the magic from killing her, and a remorseful Alice returns Julia's magic to her. Margo and Eliot successfully reveal the Fairies to all of Fillory, but are dragged from their carriage by a mob of Fillorians angry at their misgovernance of the kingdom.
| 34 | 8 | "Six Short Stories About Magic" | Salli Richardson-Whitfield | Story by : David Reed; Teleplay by : Sera Gamble & David Reed | February 28, 2018 | 0.54 |
Penny travels to the Underworld to find Benedict and the key. While there, Penny encounters Sylvia, now working for the library in her afterlife. Benedict tells Penny the library has the key, and Sylvia takes Penny to see Cassandra, the person responsible for writing all of the people's stories in the library as she can see the future. Cassandra writes stories for Penny about Poppy, Fen, Harriet, Eliot, and Alice. Quentin, Kady, Harriet, and Poppy travel to the underworld library with the help of traveler Victoria, who makes a bridge to the Mirror World. Penny is able to retrieve the key (and get it back to Quentin and Kady) from Benedict, who originally lied about its whereabouts in a misguided attempt to make Penny be his friend. Victoria and Harriet's fates are unknown when Gavin breaks the bridge. Sylvia turns Penny in to the Library, to which he owes a debt of service. It is revealed that the McAllisters are using faerie powder to give them faerie magic.
| 35 | 9 | "All That Josh" | James L. Conway | John McNamara & Jay Gard & Alex Raiman | March 7, 2018 | 0.72 |
After finding the fourth key, Kady, Quentin, and Alice find the next clue in the Tale of the Seven Keys. It is a song which Kady plays on the piano, resulting in the three being transported to an alternate reality where it is always a party in the physical kids' cottage. Here they encounter Josh and Todd who have the ability to do magic, but only party magic. Todd is actually a demon that has the fifth key. The fifth key links the minds of Julia, Eliot, Margo, Penny, Kady, Alice, Quentin, and Josh together. They have to work together to break the illusion set up by Todd. They sing "Under Pressure" by Queen and David Bowie. In Fillory, Eliot and Margo have been found guilty of damaging Fillory and have been sentenced to death. They choose to go over the infinite waterfall to their deaths. They board the Muntjac with Tick, who reveals that he feels he should be the ruler of Fillory. The Muntjac saves Eliot and Margo. In the current timeline, Julia attempts to help the fairies kept by Irene McAllister and discovers their necklaces prevent them from doing magic.
| 36 | 10 | "The Art of the Deal" | Rebecca Johnson | Christina Strain | March 14, 2018 | 0.70 |
Julia and Fen talk to Irene McAllister who agrees to help them find a necklace she uses to control her fairies in exchange for a fairy. Julia enlists the help of the fairy queen to release the McAllister fairies. The fairy queen breaks the deal the original McAllister fairy made the McAllisters to break the bond the McAllisters have over their fairies. In the Underworld Library, Penny is being shackled to a library cart. In Fillory, Alice, Quentin, and Josh find the sixth key. They tell Eliot and Margo that Tick has declared war on the Lorians and The Floaters.
| 37 | 11 | "Twenty-Three" | Meera Menon | Henry Alonso Myers & Mike Moore | March 21, 2018 | 0.77 |
Josh-23 appears from timeline no-magic 23 through a Tesla Flexion to ask Julia and Josh for help on taking down the Beast after Julia sets up wards around Brakebills. Julia and Josh travel to timeline 23. She and Marina-23 retrieve the Rhinneman Ultra from the ghost of Eliot and Margo 23. They met Penny-23 and he kisses Julia. The two Joshes are talking about the Quickening when The Beast appears and kills Josh-23. The Beast survives Julia's attack and reveals itself to be Quentin-23. Alice-23 tells the gang that Quentin was resurrected without his Shade. Quentin-23 kills Ember and keeps his powers using the seventh key, then he kills the original Beast and takes his appearance. The gang intends to use the Leo Blade from Alice on Quentin-23 and transports to Castle Whitespire. They confront him and he kills Alice. Julia gives him her Shade. Quentin-23 commits suicide after he tells Julia about his vision from the key. Julia, Josh, Marina-23 and Penny-23 go back to timeline 40.
| 38 | 12 | "The Fillorian Candidate" | Joshua Butler | Noga Landau & David Reed | March 28, 2018 | 0.73 |
Quentin, Alice and Julia discuss the Castle, and Alice suggests asking the Library about its content. Penny-23 follows Alice and finds out that the Library has a siphon which can divert all magic to them. Quentin confronts Alice. She gives him the siphon and tells him that when magic turns back on, his father will die. Julia starts hearing prayers. She gives Dean Fogg new eyes and grows back the sentient trees she destroyed. Kady is heartbroken when the Unity Key replaces her Penny with Penny-23. Penny suggests that they ask Reynard, who is now a pizza delivery man, what is inside the Castle. Julia confronts Reynard about her status and about the thing inside the Castle. She and Kady take the god-killing bullet from Reynard. Meanwhile, Fillory is having an election. Margo becomes the new High King of Fillory as a write-in by the talking animals. She gives the fairies a place to live on Fillory. In return, the Fairy Queen gives her a fairy eye and the sixth key. Quentin faces his father.
| 39 | 13 | "Will You Play With Me?" | Chris Fisher | Sera Gamble & John McNamara | April 4, 2018 | 0.66 |
The Castle at the End of the World is actually Castle Blackspire, an upside-down version of Castle Whitespire, designed by Calypso to serve Prometheus's quest. It is guarded by Ora. Julia is now a goddess and leaves the group. Alice, fearing what she might do when magic returns, asks Fogg for a personality potion to restart her life. Meanwhile, Irene is hunting down fairies. The Fairy Queen sacrifices herself for a new deal with the McAllisters that guarantees the safety of her fairies. The gang arrives at the castle. Quentin is introduced to the Monster before Eliot shoots it, and it body jumps to Ora, unknowingly to them. Alice destroys the keys, thinking that magic is bad and should not be brought back. Julia appears, says that Alice is wrong, sacrifices her divine powers to recreate the keys, and successfully brings back magic. Irene and Fogg show up and add the siphon to the fountain, diverting all magic to the Library. Alice is imprisoned in the Library; the rest of the group is mind-wiped and given new personalities. The Monster escapes and possesses Eliot.

=== Season 4 (2019) ===
| No. overall | No. in season | Title | Directed by | Written by | Original release date | U.S. viewers (millions) |
|---|---|---|---|---|---|---|
| 40 | 1 | "A Flock of Lost Birds" | Chris Fisher | Sera Gamble | January 23, 2019 | 0.61 |
Magic is now rationed. Kady/Sam finds out about alternate personalities, and she gathers Penny/Hansel, Margo/Janet and Josh/Isaac to warn them about the protective spell around it. Quentin/Brian is having trouble with the Monster/Eliot. Julia/Kim take a test to enter Brakebills. Margo/Janet is having dreams of Ember. Marina-23 takes the four of them to her apartment. Meanwhile, Alice is in the Library prison talking to Santa Claus and planning her way out. Marina-23 fails to pierce through the spell. Margo/Janet ends up in Fillory.
| 41 | 2 | "Lost, Found, Fucked" | Chris Fisher | John McNamara | January 30, 2019 | 0.53 |
The Monster is on a quest to find parts to build a body. In Fillory, Lord Fresh gives Margo/Janet her birthright box but she leaves it with him to search for Ember. Marina-23 and Penny/Hansel fail to retrieve the antidote from Fogg but successfully use the potion on him. At Brakebills, Julia/Kim finds out that it is Fogg's perpetual battery keeping the protective spell working. She dies and resurrects herself several times to overload the battery and is able to restore everyone's memories. Margo is kicked back to Earth by Bacchus. The Monster plans to kill all of Quentin's friends.
| 42 | 3 | "The Bad News Bear" | Elie Smolkin | David Reed | February 6, 2019 | 0.62 |
The gang reunites. Margo finds out Eliot is being possessed and stops the Monster's attack by agreeing to help him on his quest to build a body, which means kill Bacchus. Kady and Penny try to retrieve a Black Card and Deweys by using a luck spell. The luck spell is balanced via a teddy bear, which results in whoever holds the teddy bear experiencing all the bad luck. The spell fails to override Julia's divinity so Quentin takes it. Meanwhile, Alice stays at the Library to find her friends' books and ends up kidnapped. Santa escapes through a chimney. Kady takes over the apartment and adopts a puppy.
| 43 | 4 | "Marry, Fuck, Kill" | John Scott | Henry Alonso Myers | February 13, 2019 | 0.57 |
Margo and Josh are finding a way to lift Josh's Quickening curse. Julia and Penny travel to Fillory searching for answers for Julia's status. Julia is still a powerful goddess and she gets herself a follower named Shoshana. Alice is working with Christopher Plover and finds out about Quentin's impending death. The Monster tries to figure out the thing he takes from Bacchus. It is revealed that Eliot is alive but trapped in his mind.
| 44 | 5 | "Escape From the Happy Place" | Meera Menon | Mike Moore | February 20, 2019 | 0.53 |
Eliot is in his happy place, unaware that he is being possessed by the Monster. To have control over his body, Eliot must travel to the place that contains his greatest regret: turning down Quentin when he suggested they live happily together and raise a family after their memories were restored of their life in past-Fillory. Iris tasks Julia with trapping the Monster and will kill her if she fails. Alice sends Plover to the Poison Room and reunites with Quentin. At the park, Eliot takes over his body and tells Quentin that he is alive. The Monster takes control back. Iris appears and kills Shoshana. Before she can kill Julia for failing, the Monster kills her. Alice diverts the plan to save Quentin. Meanwhile, Fillory is having new problems. Penny-23 is kidnapped.
| 45 | 6 | "A Timeline and Place" | James L Conway | Christina Strain | February 27, 2019 | 0.53 |
Penny-23 and Marina-23 use Stoppard's device to travel through multiple timelines until Penny-23 travels to a dimension with Penny-40. Penny-40 wants Penny-23 to take his place in timeline 40 and wants him to tell Kady that he is sorry. Penny-23 and Marina-23 return to timeline 40. Alice is in Modesto with Sheila, a "quaeromancer". She breaks a leaked Library pipeline. The Hedges take this advantage and blow up the Modesto branch of the Library. Meanwhile, Margo is trying to solve the talking animals' problem. Sheila is abducted by the Library while Alice is happily watching over the children who are playing under the water she and Sheila have cleansed.
| 46 | 7 | "The Side Effect" | Salli Richardson-Whitfield | Elle Lipson | March 6, 2019 | 0.52 |
The story of Kady, Fen, and Zelda is revealed. While Kady is gone, she tries to solve some cases of hedge witches. Baba Yaga shows up and forces Kady to pay rent for Marina's apartment where she has been staying. This leads to Kady finding out about how the death of hedges relates to the Library's tracking magic. She leads the hedges to a revolution, which leads to the destruction of the Modesto Library branch. Zelda has been seeing her daughter, Harriet, and is confused about the ways of the Order when discussing Alice's escape and the explosion of the Modesto branch. Later, she asks Gavin's help in opening the portal to the Mirror World to save her daughter, but she fails. Zelda goes to Brakebills asking for Alice's help. Fen is having precognition dreams in which she sees a green-hooded woman. Penny passes a test and is promoted to the "secrets taken to the grave". The episode ends with Penny welcoming someone to the Underworld.
| 47 | 8 | "Home Improvement" | Joshua Butler | Jay Gard & Alex Raiman | March 13, 2019 | 0.53 |
Quentin and Julia go to see a dragon to trade for one of the Monster's parts in her hoard. They agree to retrieve an item recently stolen from the dragon's hoard—a supposed "magic elixir". The search leads them to a pregnant Poppy, and they discover that the elixir is actually the sperm of a male dragon that Poppy has used to fertilize a dragon egg she can raise. The egg emits pheromones that drive her, Quentin, and eventually Penny to touch and then protect it. Kady and Julia steal the egg and take it back to the dragon. Poppy says that Quentin has changed her mind about her own baby and that she will keep and raise the child instead of giving it up. She states that Quentin is not the father, but that he will be the godfather. The dragon's herald tells Julia that she should try to regain her full goddess powers and that to do so she should seek "the binder". Alice goes to her mother to get help creating a charm to help Zelda find her daughter. She and her mother reconcile to some extent, and Alice gives the charm to Zelda only to find that Sheila has since joined the Library. Meanwhile, Fen discovers her true destiny is to overthrow the High King of Fillory.
| 48 | 9 | "The Serpent" | Carol Banker | Sera Gamble & Alex Ritter | March 20, 2019 | 0.50 |
A group of terrorists threatens to infect hedges with earworms which can kill them if they use magic or try to remove it. Zelda is revealed to be a hedge witch. Alice and Kady agree to help her save Harriet from the Mirror World in exchange for a map of the junction boxes system. While trying to help Harriet, Alice accidentally splits herself into two separated personalities. Both Alices make amends inside the Mirror World and they find the Binder, which is what Julia needs, and they also successfully save Harriet. In Fillory, Fen becomes the High King after Margo begs her to overthrow her so that she can go on a quest to save Eliot. Pete is infected by the worm. Penny finds out about the Monster's true intention. Harriet reveals that Zelda's mentor, Everett, is responsible for the use of earworms on hedges.
| 49 | 10 | "All That Hard, Glossy Armor" | Shannon Kohli | John McNamara & Mike Moore | March 27, 2019 | 0.52 |
Margo is in the desert. She licks the lizard's oil which makes her see hallucinations of her subconsciousness manifested as Eliot (her id), Josh (her guilt), Fen (her lost innocence), Kady (her inadequacy), and Dean Fogg (wisdom). They all sing for Margo as she searches for the Foremost and a weapon that could save Eliot. She finds out that the desert is filled with protective women spirits who help other women when they have hard times and the tribe is living in a lie told by the Foremost and his wife. Margo eventually takes the weapon from the Foremost and releases all the spirits the wife had entrapped. Margo leaves the camp, carrying the weapons she was seeking, as she sings with her hallucinated friends. Meanwhile, the Monster is looking for a body for his sister. Alice gives Julia the Binder. Zelda finally believes she is being lied to. Quentin, Julia, and Penny try to find Enyalius, only for the Monster to appear and kill him, taking the last stone.
| 50 | 11 | "The 4-1-1" | Meera Menon | Henry Alonso Myers & Christina Strain | April 3, 2019 | 0.51 |
The Binder reveals that Bacchus, Iris, Heka, and Enyalius once were librarians who used the Binder to make themselves gods by slicing the Monster's sister into four parts and trapping the Monster in Castle Blackspire. Because the twins can't die, the Old Gods didn't shut down magic. Julia now has to choose between being a powerful goddess or a normal human. Zelda and Kady go to the Poison Room to find Everett's book. Zelda speed reads his book and discovers that Everett is hoarding magic to become a god and that he will succeed. Everett's actions are causing all the problems in Fillory over the past few days. Fen, Josh, and Tick find a secret entry in Castle Whitespire. Meanwhile, Margo reunites with the group and Alice and Quentin go on a quest to retrieve the Incorporate Bond spell by revisiting the past. The ghost of Hyman wants Penny-23 to be happy with Julia. The two of them need to stop worrying about others' happiness by ignoring their own. Julia and Penny kiss, just as the Monster appears and kidnaps her.
| 51 | 12 | "The Secret Sea" | Shannon Kohli | Elle Lipson & David Reed | April 10, 2019 | 0.56 |
Julia has a brief conversation with Persephone before The Sister enters her body and then snaps Persephone's neck. Sister Julia doesn't approve of her brother's feelings for mortals. She has a plan to kill the Old Gods by using the scroll, which the Library keeps in the Poison Room, to get to their realm. The age suspension spell kept Plover alive in the Poison Room, but Kady and Zelda are infected with the poison. Zelda reveals that they can be cured. Fogg rescues them from the Poison Room but is locked up in the Library prison. There is a cursed reservoir under Castle Whitespire, called the Secret Sea, which is also where magic has been hoarded. The only way to access the water is to be protected by the flower in the Drowned Garden if it is made to bloom, which Quentin successfully manages. He and Alice drink the water. Margo and Josh find a bond between them. Everett reveals his intentions to Zelda. The twins slaughter several librarians in the Library, except for Sheila. When Sister Julia is about to kill Fogg, she is held back by the arrival of Alice and Quentin.
| 52 | 13 | "No Better to Be Safe Than Sorry" | Chris Fisher | Sera Gamble & John McNamara | April 17, 2019 | 0.50 |
The Sister is contained in the bottle by Penny, Alice and Quentin. In order to heal Julia from the wound, Penny chooses Julia to be a normal human. Josh is cured and gains extra magic from the reservoir water, which he uses to take Quentin and him to the Old Gods before the Monster can. There, a man named Golf suggest they send the twins into the Seam in the Mirror World. Fogg appears and uses a dizzy spell on the Monster. Margo, Penny and Quentin trap the Monster using the incorporate bond, which is cast with the assistance of most of the hedges and magicians on Earth and Fillory. Quentin, Penny and Alice venture to the Mirror World to trap the twins, but are sabotaged by Everett. Quentin sacrifices himself to save everyone and stop Everett. After spending some time with Penny-40, he moves on. It is revealed that the Library wants Alice to be in charge. Margo and Eliot arrive 300 years in the future, when Fillory is ruled by a Dark King. On Earth, magic is overloaded and Julia gets her magic back.

=== Season 5 (2020) ===
| No. overall | No. in season | Title | Directed by | Written by | Original release date | U.S. viewers (millions) |
|---|---|---|---|---|---|---|
| 53 | 1 | "Do Something Crazy" | Chris Fisher | Henry Alonso Myers | January 15, 2020 | 0.43 |
Penny and Julia go stargazing, watching a magical meteor shower. They discover that due to a surge of excess magic, the meteors begin crashing to the ground, and that magic is going haywire. Julia is determined to use her re-found magic to help others. Eliot and Margo discover that Fillory jumped 300 years into the future, where Fen and Josh were overthrown by a Dark Wizard. They go to see the clock dwarf to try to correct it. Alice, overcome with grief, takes a grain of Quentin's soul and creates a golem. Meanwhile, Penny is suddenly made a professor at Brakebills for new Travelers. Kady attempts to find a way to save hedge witches from the Library's rune marks.
| 54 | 2 | "The Wrath of the Time Bees" | Chris Fisher | David Reed | January 22, 2020 | 0.36 |
Margo attempts to figure out a way to save her friends and Fillory from their dark fate. Margo's first attempt is to send back Time Bees to warn Josh and Fen, but it backfires when the bees accidentally kill Josh, as he is allergic. After multiple failed attempts, Margo realizes that she cannot save both Fillory and her friends, so instead she sends them a letter instructing Josh and Fen to have the Clock Dwarf send them three hundred years into the future. Eliot is successful with Josh, Fen, and many of their friends coming forward in time to reunite with Margo and Eliot. Eliot lets them believe that Margo saved them all. Alice's golem animates as Quentin but is the 12-year-old version of him.
| 55 | 3 | "The Mountain of Ghosts" | John S. Scott | Sera Gamble | January 29, 2020 | 0.37 |
Eliot and Alice go on a trip to the Mountain of Ghosts in Fillory to drop the last of Quentin's soul into a well that leads to the underworld, so that Quentin can be at peace and they can say goodbye. The trip is made hazardous by new creatures named "The Takers". On their trip up the mountain, they meet another magician, Sebastian, who knows how to beat the Takers. He guides them up the mountain where Eliot confesses to Alice about having lived a life with Quentin in another timeline. Fen and Margo participate in a tournament that will allow them to get close to the Dark Wizard and get Margo un-banished from Fillory to enter Castle Whitespire. Margo discovers that Josh and Fen had sex after she left Fillory, and angrily fights Fen to win the tournament. In the meantime on Earth, Julia and Penny discover the surges will cause an apocalypse during a Harmonic Convergence and try to find a solution. Alice and Eliot discover that the magician they met on the mountain is in fact the Dark King.
| 56 | 4 | "Magicians Anonymous" | Geeta V. Patel | John McNamara | February 5, 2020 | 0.39 |
Kady attends Magicians Anonymous, a support group for magic users, where she meets Dean Fogg, and they agree to hunt down a spell they can use to save hedge witches from the Library's rune mark that keeps them from doing magic. Penny and his students try to find the source of voices they hear. Eliot infiltrates Castle Whitespire by saying he would serve the Dark King. Margo and Eliot work together to uncover secrets about Seb, the Dark King, while Eliot also flirts with him. Julia communes with Clarion, the goddess of melody, who explains that the Harmonic Convergence will destroy the world. Clarion agrees to help if she can be made human. Alice and Zelda are under attack from Visigoths in the Library. Zelda burns the life books to keep the Visigoths from reading their own books. Julia makes a deal with Clarion to save Penny in exchange for his psychic powers. His student, Plum, reveals that she is a Chatwin and is determined to solve what the "signal" is. Margo discovers that the Dark King is imprisoning fairies.
| 57 | 5 | "Apocalypse? Now?!" | Shannon Kohli | Mike Moore | February 12, 2020 | 0.34 |
Zelda reveals that if they throw off the Harmonic Convergence's alignment, it will stop the apocalypse and that they can do this by moving the moon, which would also change the circumstances of magic forever going forward. Julia and Alice speak to a moon worshiper (lunatics) who tells them a spell ritual to speak to the moon to ask it to move. The gang must get "moonbrain" by staying up for 5 days to speak to the moon, and they plan a heist to steal a moonrock from Oren Westbrook, a powerful magician, tech tycoon, and lunatic. Eliot begins to see and hear visions of the Monster. Marina-23 interrupts the heist in order to keep the moon where it is because she has her own plans for casting during the Harmonic Convergence. Eliot and Marina struggle against each other casting to move the moon/keep the moon in place, and as a result, they split the moon in two while Julia declares that, "I think we broke the moon."
| 58 | 6 | "Oops!...I Did It Again" | John Scott | Hillary Benefiel | February 12, 2020 | 0.26 |
While the harmonic convergence has been stopped, the Earth is still in danger of being destroyed in 12 hours by fragments of the moon raining down. The magicians initially fail to prevent the apocalypse, but as Eliot and Margo are trapped in a time loop, they have multiple attempts. Margo declares she has found a solution, but is thrown out of the time loop before she reveals it, leaving Eliot as the only person who can actively do something. He discovers that Charlton is within him, and with Charlton's help, he retraces Margo's steps to a solution. Eliot and Charlton go to Fisher Beach, Station 17, where the whales who created the time loop as a failsafe against the release of the Kraken refuse to talk to him. After pleading with the whales, they release the Kraken, triggering the time loop a final time, just to the moment where the magicians were about to start their heist in Oren Westbrook's house. Eliot, remembering everything, manages to change their plan, Margo knocks down Marina, the moon begins to listen and decides to move, and the harmonic convergence is prevented without triggering the lunar apocalypse.
| 59 | 7 | "Acting Dean" | Sterlin Harjo | Elle Lipson | February 19, 2020 | 0.33 |
Earth is saved, but on Fillory, Margo and Eliot must stop a member of the Dark King's army with genocidal tendencies towards fairies. Alice tries to fix circumstances that interfere with magic following the end of the lunar apocalypse which left the moon angry. An evil Dean Fogg arrives from timeline 17 and plots to move the entire Brakebills-40 to timeline 17. Julia breaks up with Penny. In Fillory, Margo goes to see the fairies and meets Fen. After their confrontation with Bick Pickwick and his centurions, Eliot reveals to the Dark King that Bick is in possession of a believed-to-be-extinct species that can defecate gold. As gratitude for saving them, the fairies reveal to Margo, Eliot, and Fen the truth about the Dark King. He is the one who summons the Takers using the royal gold. Fogg-17 is locked in prison at Brakebills.
| 60 | 8 | "Garden Variety Homicide" | James L. Conway | Jay Gard & Alex Raiman | February 26, 2020 | 0.31 |
A group of children are taken by the Takers so Eliot, Margo, Julia, and Josh plan on killing Seb, but Eliot is conflicted as he has feelings for him. The bunnies reveal Julia's pregnancy is accelerating because of "Red Monkey Month". Eliot learns about Seb's link to a tree, and they plot to cut the tree down to kill him. Eliot and Margo's bodies are swapped, and Margo discovers Charlton's existence. Eliot accidentally ruins Margo and Josh's relationship when he and Josh are on a journey to cut down the tree. After Eliot manages to cut the tree down, Margo cannot kill the Dark King after coming to understand him. Julia arrives and runs her sword through Seb's chest, seemingly killing him. Alice meets Hamish Bax at Brakebills, who calls on a plant expert to figure out Alice's page. The expert has been infected by a type of fungus, and the fungus wants the page. Hamish is injured, so he and Alice go to the greenhouse to find a way to heal him. There, they discover a "circumstances panel" which can help them cast spells normally. Alice and Hamish find a way to defeat the fungus after it possesses Penny. Penny tells Alice that the page is about the "World Seed", which is also what the Couple is after. Seb wakes up from his wounds, alive.
| 61 | 9 | "Cello Squirrel Daffodil" | Tawnia McKiernan | Stephanie Coggins | March 4, 2020 | 0.38 |
Eliot and Julia are captured by Seb for the attempt to assassinate him. Margo and Fen return to Earth after being chased by the centurions. There, Margo and Fen meet Plover, who is cursed by the Tongue Twisters. To fix the problem, Margo calls on Gordy to help, only to solve the problem herself by exorcising the Tongue Twisters using her axes. Plover reveals that Seb is actually Rupert Chatwin. After seeing Martin became dark and violent, Rupert tried to stop him by binding himself to Fillory, which made him immortal. Infuriated by this, Martin cursed Rupert to sleep forever. After Everett died, surges of magic were created that were so intense that they woke Rupert from Martin's spell. Rupert summoned the Takers and then kept them at bay so he could become High King. Rupert is trying to bring his lover, Lance, back to life. Margo decides to curse Plover again after seeing how he acts towards Fen. Rupert decides not to execute Julia and Eliot; instead, he asks them to help him with a spell to talk to the dead, which succeeds. Plum returns and she and Penny discover her ability to travel through time. They end up traveling to a room that the Signal has drawn them to. Kady and Alice are being tortured by the Couple to give them the page. The Couple cuts off four of Alice's fingers.
| 62 | 10 | "Purgatory" | Shannon Kohli | Alex Ritter | March 11, 2020 | 0.31 |
Penny and Plum arrive where the Signal has drawn them. A keeper of space-time and time traveler named Eliphas arrives and asks Plum to remove her limited genetic particles which make her able to travel through time in exchange for their release. Josh is sent to a place between the Underworld and the realm of the living, which is also the place where the Takers are from, and manages to travel to the Underworld with a girl that has been captured by the Takers. There, he meets Penny-40. Margo is experiencing excruciating pains in her head due to her fairy eye seeing other realms. Through the eye, Josh manages to ask Alice and Kady to find Hades, who is on Earth grieving the loss of his wife, Persephone. Hades reveals that both Fillory and Earth will be doomed if all of the dead go back to the land of the living, and he insists on fixing that problem. Julia is experiencing the baby's Traveler ability every time she becomes anxious. Julia's newfound powers help her and Eliot to escape prison and get back to Earth. Kady and Alice return to the penthouse. Alice's fingers are restored, and Kady wants revenge. Penny and Plum reunite with the group and Penny learns about Julia's pregnancy. Josh finally escapes the Underworld and he learns that all the Takers are dead.
| 63 | 11 | "Be the Hyman" | David Reed | Mike Moore & David Reed | March 18, 2020 | 0.37 |
Penny and Julia reconcile. Margo, Fen, Josh, and Eliot enter a dream state and they meet Ember and Umber, who warn them that the return of the dead will corrupt Fillory and other worlds. Umber reveals that he has an ark which can be used to save the Fillorians. Penny asks Hyman to help take Eliot, Fen, Margo, and Josh to Umber's house to retrieve the ark. There, Fen successfully takes the ark, also known as the Great Seahorse, by using her knowledge of Fillory. Kady and Alice find Marina has reformed and that she has a girlfriend named Anna. They plan to turn her evil again so she can help them steal the World Seed from the Couple at the Nave Hotel. Alice wants to use the seed to grow a new Fillory. Penny reveals to Julia that his mother also had episodes and mental breakdowns when she was pregnant with him, and he fears this will happen to Julia. After spending time in his body, Hyman wishes to be in the astral plane again. The Couple frees Fogg-17 from his prison, and he steals the circumstances panel. Julia meets with Sir Effingham, who reveals his visions of Fillory's destruction to her. Marina reverts to her old self.
| 64 | 12 | "The Balls" | Meera Menon | Elle Lipson & John McNamara & Joseph Mireles | March 25, 2020 | 0.40 |
The group makes a plan to steal the seed from the Nave Hotel despite its legendary security system and it being guarded by empathy golems. Zelda helps by casting a spell but it is interrupted by Sir Effingham. The spell is meddled with, and it makes the group break into song every time they become emotional, so they have to bottle their emotions. Sir Effingham insists the group eliminate Julia as she is plotting to destroy Fillory. Marina steers everyone through the heist. The Couple reveals to Fen that they want to use the seed to make a world where they can start a family. Because the Couple has made so many enemies, they were cursed to never being able to have a child on Earth. Fogg-17 tries to disrupt the heist, but Kady tricks him into drinking drugs and traps him in the etheric realm. Margo injures the Couple during a confrontation. The group successfully steals the seed, and Alice calls on Santa Claus to help them escape by using his sled. Penny discovers that his mother is working as a nurse, and he also discovers that there is a connection between a mother and her Traveler baby. The connection will cause mental breakdowns if the mother and her baby are in proximity to each other, which led her to abandon Penny.
| 65 | 13 | "Fillory and Further" | Chris Fisher | Sera Gamble & Henry Alonso Myers | April 1, 2020 | 0.43 |
The dead begin returning to the world, including the Beast. Zelda sacrifices herself to help the others escape. Seb chooses to die with Fillory to help ensure the end of the threat as Margo triggers Fillory's destruction. Professor Lipson provides a way to restore Fogg's mind, and he is able to share a way to save Julia and her and Penny's daughter Hope; as a result, Penny regains his powers whenever he holds Hope and is able to rescue Margo. Seb finds peace as Josh, Fen, Margo and Alice use the World Seed to create a new Fillory based on their own ideals, but they vanish in the process. Eliot becomes a professor at Brakebills and begins a relationship with Charlton while Penny and Julia search for their missing friends. Josh, Fen, Margo and Alice end up in the new world where they prepare to release the Fillorians to start over.

== Ratings ==
The Magicians : U.S. viewers per episode (thousands)

| Season | Episode number | | | | | | | | | | | | | Average |
| Season | 1 | 2 | 3 | 4 | 5 | 6 | 7 | 8 | 9 | 10 | 11 | 12 | 13 | Average |
|---|---|---|---|---|---|---|---|---|---|---|---|---|---|---|
| 1 | 920 | 1110 | 900 | 750 | 750 | 650 | 700 | 670 | 710 | 780 | 720 | 750 | 680 | 775 |
| 2 | 1280 | 940 | 910 | 780 | 880 | 780 | 630 | 710 | 610 | 720 | 650 | 670 | 670 | 788 |
| 3 | 780 | 760 | 610 | 670 | 800 | 670 | 640 | 540 | 720 | 700 | 770 | 730 | 660 | 710 |
| 4 | 610 | 530 | 620 | 570 | 530 | 530 | 520 | 530 | 500 | 520 | 510 | 560 | 500 | 540 |
| 5 | 430 | 360 | 370 | 390 | 340 | 260 | 330 | 310 | 380 | 310 | 370 | 400 | 430 | 350 |

Audience measurement performed by Nielsen Media Research

=== Season 1 ===
Viewership and ratings per episode of List of The Magicians (American TV series) episodes
| No. | Title | Air date | Rating (18–49) | Viewers (millions) | DVR (18–49) | DVR viewers (millions) | Total (18–49) | Total viewers (millions) |
|---|---|---|---|---|---|---|---|---|
| 1 | "Unauthorized Magic" | December 16, 2015 | 0.2 | 0.92 | —N/a | —N/a | —N/a | —N/a |
| 2 | "The Source of Magic" | January 25, 2016 | 0.4 | 1.11 | —N/a | —N/a | —N/a | —N/a |
| 3 | "Consequences of Advanced Spellcasting" | February 1, 2016 | 0.4 | 0.90 | 0.3 | 0.89 | 0.7 | 1.79 |
| 4 | "The World in the Walls" | February 8, 2016 | 0.3 | 0.75 | 0.3 | 0.80 | 0.6 | 1.54 |
| 5 | "Mendings, Major and Minor" | February 15, 2016 | 0.3 | 0.75 | —N/a | —N/a | —N/a | —N/a |
| 6 | "Impractical Applications" | February 22, 2016 | 0.3 | 0.65 | —N/a | —N/a | —N/a | —N/a |
| 7 | "The Mayakovsky Circumstance" | February 29, 2016 | 0.3 | 0.70 | 0.3 | 0.85 | 0.6 | 1.55 |
| 8 | "The Strangled Heart" | March 7, 2016 | 0.3 | 0.67 | 0.3 | 0.81 | 0.6 | 1.49 |
| 9 | "The Writing Room" | March 14, 2016 | 0.3 | 0.71 | 0.3 | 0.76 | 0.6 | 1.47 |
| 10 | "Homecoming" | March 21, 2016 | 0.3 | 0.78 | —N/a | —N/a | —N/a | —N/a |
| 11 | "Remedial Battle Magic" | March 28, 2016 | 0.3 | 0.72 | 0.3 | 0.78 | 0.6 | 1.50 |
| 12 | "Thirty-Nine Graves" | April 4, 2016 | 0.3 | 0.75 | 0.3 | 0.73 | 0.6 | 1.48 |
| 13 | "Have You Brought Me Little Cakes" | April 11, 2016 | 0.3 | 0.68 | 0.3 | 0.76 | 0.6 | 1.43 |

=== Season 2 ===
Viewership and ratings per episode of List of The Magicians (American TV series) episodes
| No. | Title | Air date | Rating (18–49) | Viewers (millions) | DVR (18–49) | DVR viewers (millions) | Total (18–49) | Total viewers (millions) |
|---|---|---|---|---|---|---|---|---|
| 1 | "Knight of Crowns" | January 25, 2017 | 0.5 | 1.29 | 0.5 | 1.17 | 1.0 | 2.46 |
| 2 | "Hotel Spa Potions" | February 1, 2017 | 0.4 | 0.94 | 0.4 | 0.83 | 0.8 | 1.77 |
| 3 | "Divine Elimination" | February 8, 2017 | 0.4 | 0.91 | 0.4 | 0.81 | 0.7 | 1.72 |
| 4 | "The Flying Forest" | February 15, 2017 | 0.3 | 0.78 | 0.4 | 0.97 | 0.7 | 1.75 |
| 5 | "Cheat Day" | February 22, 2017 | 0.4 | 0.88 | 0.4 | 0.87 | 0.8 | 1.75 |
| 6 | "The Cock Barrens" | March 1, 2017 | 0.3 | 0.78 | —N/a | —N/a | —N/a | —N/a |
| 7 | "Plan B" | March 8, 2017 | 0.2 | 0.63 | 0.5 | 0.84 | 0.7 | 1.47 |
| 8 | "Word as Bond" | March 15, 2017 | 0.3 | 0.71 | 0.4 | 0.90 | 0.7 | 1.61 |
| 9 | "Lesser Evils" | March 22, 2017 | 0.3 | 0.61 | 0.3 | 0.81 | 0.6 | 1.42 |
| 10 | "The Girl Who Told Time" | March 29, 2017 | 0.3 | 0.72 | 0.4 | 0.85 | 0.7 | 1.57 |
| 11 | "The Rattening" | April 5, 2017 | 0.2 | 0.65 | 0.4 | 0.70 | 0.6 | 1.35 |
| 12 | "Ramifications" | April 12, 2017 | 0.3 | 0.67 | 0.3 | 0.76 | 0.6 | 1.43 |
| 13 | "We Have Brought You Little Cakes" | April 19, 2017 | 0.3 | 0.67 | 0.3 | 0.75 | 0.6 | 1.42 |

=== Season 3 ===
Viewership and ratings per episode of List of The Magicians (American TV series) episodes
| No. | Title | Air date | Rating (18–49) | Viewers (millions) | DVR (18–49) | DVR viewers (millions) | Total (18–49) | Total viewers (millions) |
|---|---|---|---|---|---|---|---|---|
| 1 | "The Tales of the Seven Keys" | January 10, 2018 | 0.3 | 0.78 | 0.3 | 0.77 | 0.6 | 1.55 |
| 2 | "Heroes and Morons" | January 17, 2018 | 0.3 | 0.76 | 0.3 | 0.59 | 0.6 | 1.35 |
| 3 | "The Losses of Magic" | January 24, 2018 | 0.2 | 0.61 | 0.3 | 0.69 | 0.5 | 1.30 |
| 4 | "Be the Penny" | January 31, 2018 | 0.3 | 0.67 | —N/a | 0.64 | —N/a | 1.31 |
| 5 | "A Life in the Day" | February 7, 2018 | 0.3 | 0.80 | —N/a | —N/a | —N/a | —N/a |
| 6 | "Do You Like Teeth?" | February 14, 2018 | 0.3 | 0.67 | —N/a | —N/a | —N/a | —N/a |
| 7 | "Poached Eggs" | February 21, 2018 | 0.2 | 0.64 | —N/a | —N/a | —N/a | —N/a |
| 8 | "Six Short Stories About Magic" | February 28, 2018 | 0.2 | 0.54 | —N/a | 0.56 | —N/a | 1.11 |
| 9 | "All That Josh" | March 7, 2018 | 0.3 | 0.72 | —N/a | —N/a | —N/a | —N/a |
| 10 | "The Art of the Deal" | March 14, 2018 | 0.3 | 0.70 | —N/a | 0.67 | —N/a | 1.37 |
| 11 | "Twenty-Three" | March 21, 2018 | 0.3 | 0.77 | 0.3 | 0.73 | 0.6 | 1.49 |
| 12 | "The Fillorian Candidate" | March 28, 2018 | 0.3 | 0.73 | —N/a | —N/a | —N/a | —N/a |
| 13 | "Will You Play With Me?" | April 4, 2018 | 0.2 | 0.66 | 0.3 | 0.74 | 0.5 | 1.40 |

=== Season 4 ===
Viewership and ratings per episode of List of The Magicians (American TV series) episodes
| No. | Title | Air date | Rating (18–49) | Viewers (millions) | DVR (18–49) | DVR viewers (millions) | Total (18–49) | Total viewers (millions) |
|---|---|---|---|---|---|---|---|---|
| 1 | "A Flock of Lost Birds" | January 23, 2019 | 0.2 | 0.61 | 0.3 | 0.77 | 0.5 | 1.38 |
| 2 | "Lost, Found, Fucked" | January 30, 2019 | 0.2 | 0.53 | —N/a | 0.66 | —N/a | 1.19 |
| 3 | "The Bad News Bear" | February 6, 2019 | 0.2 | 0.62 | 0.2 | 0.51 | 0.4 | 1.13 (Note: Live +7 ratings were not available, so Live +3 ratings have been used instead.) |
| 4 | "Marry Fuck Kill" | February 13, 2019 | 0.2 | 0.57 | 0.3 | 0.72 | 0.5 | 1.29 |
| 5 | "Escape From the Happy Place" | February 20, 2019 | 0.2 | 0.53 | —N/a | 0.57 | —N/a | 1.10 |
| 6 | "A Timeline and Place" | February 27, 2019 | 0.2 | 0.53 | 0.3 | 0.66 | 0.5 | 1.19 |
| 7 | "The Side Effect" | March 6, 2019 | 0.2 | 0.52 | 0.3 | 0.65 | 0.5 | 1.17 |
| 8 | "Home Improvement" | March 13, 2019 | 0.2 | 0.53 | 0.2 | 0.54 | 0.4 | 1.07 |
| 9 | "The Serpent" | March 20, 2019 | 0.2 | 0.50 | 0.2 | 0.63 | 0.4 | 1.13 |
| 10 | "All That Hard, Glossy Armor" | March 27, 2019 | 0.2 | 0.52 | 0.3 | 0.71 | 0.5 | 1.22 |
| 11 | "The 4-1-1" | April 3, 2019 | 0.2 | 0.51 | 0.2 | 0.65 | 0.4 | 1.15 |
| 12 | "The Secret Sea" | April 10, 2019 | 0.2 | 0.56 | 0.3 | 0.72 | 0.5 | 1.28 |
| 13 | "No Better to Be Safe Than Sorry" | April 17, 2019 | 0.2 | 0.50 | —N/a | 0.56 | —N/a | 1.06 |

=== Season 5 ===
Viewership and ratings per episode of List of The Magicians (American TV series) episodes
| No. | Title | Air date | Rating (18–49) | Viewers (millions) |
|---|---|---|---|---|
| 1 | "Do Something Crazy" | January 15, 2020 | 0.15 | 0.429 |
| 2 | "The Wrath of the Time Bees" | January 22, 2020 | 0.09 | 0.355 |
| 3 | "The Mountain of Ghosts" | January 29, 2020 | 0.11 | 0.374 |
| 4 | "Magicians Anonymous" | February 5, 2020 | 0.14 | 0.338 |
| 5 | "Apocalypse? Now!?" | February 12, 2020 | 0.09 | 0.335 |
| 6 | "Oops!... I Did it again" | February 12, 2020 | 0.07 | 0.261 |
| 7 | "Acting Dean" | February 19, 2020 | 0.1 | 0.328 |
| 8 | "Garden Variety Homicide" | February 26, 2020 | 0.1 | 0.308 |
| 9 | "Cello Squirrel Daffodil" | March 4, 2020 | 0.12 | 0.376 |
| 10 | "Purgatory" | March 11, 2020 | 0.07 | 0.308 |
| 11 | "Be the Hyman" | March 18, 2020 | 0.14 | 0.369 |
| 12 | "The Balls" | March 25, 2020 | 0.12 | 0.379 |
| 13 | "Fillory and Further" | April 1, 2020 | 0.14 | 0.432 |
