= Profit (TV series) =

- Promotional poster
- Genre: Drama; Thriller; Satire
- Created by: David Greenwalt; John McNamara
- Starring: Adrian Pasdar; Lisa Zane; Keith Szarabajka; Jack Gwaltney; Allison Hossack; Lisa Darr; Lisa Blount; Sherman Augustus; Scott Paulin; Jennifer Hetrick
- Composers: Walter Murphy; Mike Post
- Country of origin: United States
- Original language: English
- No. of seasons: 1
- No. of episodes: 8

Production
- Executive producers: Jo Swerling Jr.; David Greenwalt; John McNamara; Stephen J. Cannell
- Camera setup: Single-camera
- Running time: 60 minutes
- Production companies: Greenwalt/McNamara Productions; Cannell Entertainment; New World Entertainment

Original release
- Network: Fox (episodes 1–4); Trio (episodes 5–8)
- Release: April 8 – April 29, 1996

Profit is an American drama television series that originally aired in 1996 on the Fox Broadcasting Company (Mondays at 9:00 p.m. EST). The series was created by David Greenwalt and John McNamara, who each directed several episodes. It starred Adrian Pasdar as the eponymous lead character Jim Profit. In February 2008, repeat episodes began airing on Chiller (in the USA), and in October 2010 on CBS Action (in Europe).

Considered by many to have been well ahead of its time, the series was a precursor to the trend of "edgy" TV melodramas (featuring dark themes and multidimensional characters) such as The Sopranos, Mad Men, and Breaking Bad. Controversial themes largely stemming from the lead character's amoral, Richard III-esque ways, made the show uncomfortable and unfamiliar viewing for mainstream U.S. audiences and Fox network affiliates at the time. Combined with low ratings, it resulted in the series' cancellation after just four episodes (including the pilot) aired. In 2013 TV Guide ranked the series #4 on its list of 60 shows that were "Canceled Too Soon", calling the series "shockingly memorable".

== Premise ==
Jim Profit is a newly promoted junior-executive at Gracen & Gracen (G&G), a multinational conglomerate that often engages in unethical business practices while actively cultivating a positive public image. G&G's dark side does not bother Profit, who is not above using blackmail, bribery, extortion, or worse to get ahead himself. Jim Profit addresses the audience via voiceover narration and breaking the fourth wall. Raised by an abusive father and step-mother who sexually assaulted him, Profit sees G&G as a family. While obviously affluent and living in a well-furnished luxury penthouse, Profit still goes to bed the same way he did as a child: curled up, naked in the corner of a large G&G shipping box like the one he was raised in.

== Characters ==
=== Main ===
- Jim Profit (Adrian Pasdar) – born James "Jimmy" Stakowski, he was raised in a cardboard G&G shipping box (with a hole cut out for him to view a constantly-on television) by a neglectful, physically and psychologically abusive father in a rural area near Tulsa, Oklahoma. Profit reinvents himself as an Ivy League-educated, corporate business prodigy after escaping his past by chaining his father to his bed, setting it afire, then fleeing the family ranch as a teenager. His upbringing leaves Profit with a hatred of TV, and idolizing Gracen & Gracen as the ideal family he never had. As a result, Profit's goal as an adult is to rise high enough in G&G to indispensably embed himself into the Gracens’ business and personal lives – by any means necessary. He worked in auditing before ascending to junior vice president of Acquisitions; his stated goal is to become president of Acquisitions. He climbs the corporate ladder by covertly engineering the ruin of those who stand in his way and/or refuse to assist him, while mostly staying behind-the-scenes himself.
- Joanne Meltzer (Lisa Zane) – Profit's archenemy and G&G's obsessive, crusading West Coast chief of security. She had a short-lived affair with Jack Walters while his wife had temporarily run off with a lover. She remains loyal to and friendly with Jack, admiring his decent and ethical nature – even after he reconciles with his wife (who openly resents her). Jack's spectacular downfall (engineered by Profit) along with parallels in the natures of Profit and her older sister (who raised but also brutally abused her) are key forces driving her to expose and stop Profit. A former police detective and "fanatical in pursuit of a goal", the ever-suspicious Meltzer constantly tries to figure out and foil Profit's plans, but is oftentimes a step behind her nemesis. She admires Jeffrey Sykes for his sterling morals, and perceives him as able to outsmart and defeat Profit.
- Charles Henry "Chaz" Gracen (Keith Szarabajka) – G&G's no-nonsense, paranoid, violently short-tempered chief executive officer. Although he takes a different mistress each year, making money is his only love. To clients and all outsiders to G&G he convincingly pretends to be soft-spoken, friendly and patient. Though usually agitated and curt, Chaz occasionally displays a dark, passive-aggressive sense of humor, constantly berates his brother, and bitterly chafes at working in the long shadow of his meddling father/boss, G&G's founder and chairman emeritus of the G&G board of directors.
- Pete Gracen (Jack Gwaltney) – Chaz's younger brother, and the senior vice president of Acquisitions. A longtime alcoholic, Pete secretly wants Chaz's approval – and to be president of Acquisitions, or even CEO – despite being impotent, immature, and apparently incompetent. Drunken stupors, often in public with family, are frequent sources of embarrassment and humiliation for Pete.
- Nora Gracen (Allison Hossack) – Pete's insecure, emotionally fragile, lonely trophy wife. Trusting and desperate for the love and sense of purpose that her failing husband can no longer provide, she becomes hopelessly obsessed with Profit, after he seduces her but then (intentionally) ends their affair just before physically consummating it. Nora regards Profit as a close friend, confidant, and kindred spirit; Profit strings her along by continuing to build intimacy between them, then restating that he wants to be "just friends" whenever she tries to act on her attraction to him. She harbors unhealed emotional wounds from a childhood tragedy.
- Gail Koner (Lisa Darr) – Profit's resourceful, morally conflicted secretary (originally Jack Walters' secretary), and primary henchperson. Initially, Profit blackmails Gail into assisting him in his schemes; however, she feels increasingly loyal (and/or obligated) to Profit, as he rewards her service with extravagant favors (e.g., saving her job, hiding her embezzlement, and arranging for vastly upgraded – and fully paid – nursing home care for her seriously ill mother). She may be the only character that Profit has any genuine human connection with. Profit takes pride as he guides Gail in developing her skills in duplicity. Profit seems interested in her mother's well-being, and after Gail is passed over for promotion (yet again), he promises to mold her into "executive material."
- Bobbi Stakowski (Lisa Blount) – Profit's hedonistic, temperamental step-mother (his father's 2nd wife), and occasional lover (who seduced and molested him during his socially isolated, early adolescence). A shrewd-yet-unpredictable drug abuser, con woman and former prostitute, Bobbi repeatedly tries to blackmail Profit (with threats of exposing evidence of his true background and past crimes – including murder) into financing a luxurious, effort-free lifestyle for her.
- Jeffrey Sykes (Sherman Augustus) – a litigious corporate law attorney and G&G's newly hired vice president of Business Affairs. A highly driven, P.R.-savvy do-gooder, Sykes takes a more directly antagonistic approach to Profit and is warmly welcomed by Joanne Meltzer as an ally. Sykes is single-mindedly committed to a secret, personal agenda that repeatedly – but sometimes unwittingly – disrupts Profit's schemes.

=== Recurring and guests ===
- Jack Walters (Scott Paulin) – G&G's former President of Acquisitions.
- Elizabeth Gracen-Walters (Jennifer Hetrick) – Jack's (recovering) alcoholic wife; cousin of "Chaz" and Pete.
- Constance Gracen (Teryl Rothery) – Chaz's estranged wife.
- Dr. Jeremy Batewell (John Hawkes) – a former G&G employee who sexually harassed Gail Koner.
- "Kelly Hunt"/Carol McKenna (Jessica Tuck) – Profit's female equivalent.

== Episodes ==
No.	Title	Directed by	Written by	Original release date
1	"Pilot"	Robert Iscove	John McNamara & David Greenwalt	April 8, 1996 (Fox)
Jim aims to eliminate the President of Acquisitions so he can claim the job for himself by leaking damaging information about a recent G&G acquisition to the press, and blackmailing Jack Walters' executive assistant into helping him do it. Jim also befriends Pete's wife, Nora Gracen.
2	"Hero"	Robert Iscove	David Greenwalt	April 15, 1996 (Fox)
Joanne Meltzer and Jack Walters delve into Profit's past while Jim befriends Jack's vulnerable wife, who inadvertently presents Jim with a way to remove Jack permanently.
3	"Sykes"	Jim Charleston	David Greenwalt	April 22, 1996 (Fox)
Jim is ordered to recruit Jeffrey Sykes to G&G's executive team and to acquire a waste company with organized crime ownership but Sykes has his own agenda, and it has little to do with representing G&G's PR interests.
4	"Healing"	Robert Iscove	John McNamara	April 29, 1996 (Fox)
Joanne and Jim's rivalry comes to a head when Chaz orders them both to take lie detector tests to put the negative rumors about both to rest for good. Jim blackmails Joanne's psychiatrist and hijacks her psychotherapy sessions in an attempt to destabilize Joanne and make her fail the test.
5	"Cupid"	Scott Paulin	John Shirley	December 6, 2002 (Trio)
G&G wants to acquire a lucrative nightclub company that is jointly owned by spouses who have separated due to the husband's abusive, controlling ways. Jim and Sykes are ordered to get the two sides back together long enough to close the deal. Bobbi sets her sights on Chaz.
6	"Chinese Box"	David Greenwalt	W. K. Scott Meyer	December 7, 2002 (Trio)
In order to avoid an imminent FBI investigation, Profit must quickly sever G&G's business relationship with a recently acquired Chinese company – while avoiding a multimillion-dollar contract termination penalty – by obtaining a military code-breaking microchip from its designer: an eccentric tech genius who G&G fired for sexually harassing another employee (Gail Koner).
7	"Security"	Michael Engler	John McNamara	December 8, 2002 (Trio)
Jim is having a secret affair with the newest G&G security team member; but, just like Jim, she is not who she appears to be.
8	"Forgiveness"	Robert Iscove	David Greenwalt	December 9, 2002 (Trio)
Jim's manipulations come to a head: a secret from Nora's past may hold the key to derailing an imminent hostile takeover of G&G, Joanne and Sykes come closer to finding the "real" Jim Profit and Bobbi faces a near-death experience that makes her realize what she really wants out of life.

== Critical reception ==
The critical response to Profit at the time of its debut was overwhelmingly positive. On the review aggregator website Rotten Tomatoes, the series holds an approval rating of 94% based on 16 reviews, with an average rating of 9.0/10. The site's critical consensus reads, "Unapologetically amoral and headlined by an unnerving Adrian Pasdar, Profit pays off handsomely as outrageous entertainment."

Howard Rosenberg of the Los Angeles Times called Profit "... rip-roaring, sinus-clearing, bold and wonderful." Tom Gliatto of People magazine said of Profit: "Refreshingly cruel, Fox's Profit is the most exciting new show I've seen this year." John J. O'Conner from The New York Times called Profit "one of the most intriguing shows to come along since Twin Peaks ..." Joyce Millman of salon.com stated: "Profit gains heft ... from its nervy satiric vision of corporate capitalist culture." Eric Mink from The New York Daily News stated "Jim Profit may well be the most unremittingly evil character ever to serve as the protagonist and principal voice of a network TV series. Next to Profit, Dallas' J.R. Ewing is as menacing as Babe the Pig." Entertainment Weekly included Profit in its "Ten Best TV Shows for 1996" list at position #8.

== Controversy and cancellation ==
Despite numerous positive critical reviews and intense industry buzz, Profit was canceled after only 5 out of the 9 hours produced were actually broadcast by Fox. Low Nielsen ratings were cited as the official cause; Profit ranked 138th of 160 shows for 1996 and suffered from viewer tune-out during the airing of the 2-hour pilot episode. Other factors that may have hastened Profit’s demise include:

- Viewers reportedly flooded their local Fox network affiliates with phone calls objecting to Jim Profit’s immoral actions, some even referring to him as "Satan in a Suit"; such opinions were most vociferously expressed by viewers in the Bible Belt region of the southern USA. Some Fox network affiliates even threatened to pre-empt Profit in their local markets, replacing it with alternative programming.
- Members of the business community were outraged that Profit portrayed them so poorly. Shaifali Puri of Fortune said: "Just in case there's anyone left who isn't convinced corporate America is a den of naked ambition and bald turpitude, comes now (the TV show) Profit." It was rumored that even Fox network founder Rupert Murdoch objected to the show's edgy portrayal of corporate America, although Adrian Pasdar was quoted as saying that Profit was Murdoch's favorite TV show.
- Airings of Profit consistently lost almost all of the lead-in audience from the smash-hit melodrama Melrose Place (the original version) which was scheduled in the timeslot immediately preceding Profit. This reportedly did not sit well with Melrose Place's executive producer Aaron Spelling, especially after Time and Entertainment Weekly published glowing reviews of Profit but scathing reviews of Melrose Place. Coincidentally, Spelling even approached Adrian Pasdar in 1992 to play the role of Jake Hanson on Melrose Place; however Pasdar rejected the role despite Spelling's status as one of the most powerful and influential U.S. television producers of the 1970s-1990s.

Profit co-creator David Greenwalt hypothesized that "What might have turned off viewers to Profit wasn't just that it was so different [from other TV shows of the time] but that it was such an affront to it." The cancellation of Profit was lamented by the organization Viewers for Quality Television; VQT founder Dorothy Swanson stated: "It certainly was not a mainstream show. It wasn't for everyone. There were parts of it I'm sure mainstream viewers found very disturbing and unappealing. But for people who like interesting television, it was very well written. It was spellbinding. You had to know what made this guy (Jim Profit) tick."

== Awards ==
- Adrian Pasdar was nominated for a 1996 Petcabus Award in the category "Best Actor in a Drama Series" for his role as Jim Profit.
- Profit was nominated for a 1996 Artios Award in category "Best Casting for TV, Dramatic Pilot".

== Home media ==
Anchor Bay Entertainment released the complete series on DVD in Region 1 on August 9, 2005. The three-disc set contains the two-hour pilot and seven episodes (the final four of which did not air during the original run on Fox). Interviews with Stephen J. Cannell, David Greenwalt, John McNamara, Adrian Pasdar, Lisa Blount, and Lisa Zane are presented in a 67-minute documentary called Greed Kills about the making of Profit. Audio commentary with Adrian Pasdar and series creators David Greenwalt and John McNamara is provided for the 2-hour pilot and the episodes "Healing", "Chinese Box", and "Forgiveness". As of 2010, this DVD release has been discontinued and is out of print.

Free Dolphin Entertainment released the complete series on DVD in Region 2 on October 20, 2005. The three-disc set contains the two-hour pilot and seven episodes, along with the option of French subtitles (with the original English voice audio) or French-dubbed voice audio for all episodes. A 23-minute featurette produced in 1999 by French TV station Jimmy titled "Profit Special" (covering the impact and enormous popularity of Profit in France) was included in this release, along with the Greed Kills featurette from the Region 1 release. Seven minutes of Fox promotional spots for Profit were provided as well, including a unique 30-second trailer showing Jim Profit crushing a spider on a park bench, dismissively calling it an "amateur" (predator).

Ostalgica released the complete series on DVD in Region 2 on April 24, 2012, under the title Jim Profit – Ein Mann geht über Leichen (A Man Walks over Dead Bodies). The three-disc set contains the two-hour pilot and seven episodes, along with the option of the original English or German-dubbed voice audio for all episodes.

The content of the episodes is identical on all releases of the DVD with the exception of the opening voiceover by Jim Profit in the pilot episode:

- Region 1 Voiceover: Wayne Gresham is dead. A former VP at Gracen and Gracen incorporated, he was overworked, overweight, and well now, just plain "over". This is Wayne's boss, Jack Walters. He's the president of acquisitions, a smart decent man. As well respected as anyone at G&G. Gail Koner, Jack's secretary. Is that grief in her eyes or is she hiding something? Let's find out.
- Region 2 Voiceover: Wayne Gresham is dead. He was 47 years old. A junior vice president of acquisitions at Gracen and Gracen incorporated where I happen to work. This is Wayne's boss, Jack Walters. He's the president of acquisitions, a smart decent man. As well respected as anyone at Gracen and Gracen. Gail Koner, Jack's executive secretary, a loyal employee of 3 years and very devoted to her boss.

== Production ==
Profit was produced by Greenwalt/McNamara Productions and Stephen J. Cannell Productions in association with New World Television, and was the final series to come from Cannell's company (as well as one of the few for which he did not write any scripts).

The exterior shots outside the Gracen & Gracen twin towers were filmed on the plaza in front of the Sheraton Wall Centre Hotel in Vancouver. For production, a "Gracen & Gracen Wall Center" placard was positioned over the covered entrance in front of one building and two G&G logo monuments were placed in the front and center of the plaza. Another part of the same hotel complex now includes the well-known One Wall Centre building that had not yet been constructed when Profit was shot in early 1996.

According to the Region 1 DVD liner notes, the interior G&G office shots for the two-hour pilot episode were taken at the real working offices of B.C. Gas and that of a prestigious law firm in downtown Vancouver. Subsequent episodes were shot in studio sets modeled after these offices. The scene outside a hospital with Joanne Meltzer and Profit in the episode "Healing" was shot in front of St. Paul's Hospital located just across Burrard Street from the Sheraton Wall Centre. The exterior of Profit's apartment building featuring columnar bay windows up and down the entire front of the building is a location called Eugenia Place in Vancouver's West End; the structure is notable for the presence of a 35-foot Pin oak tree growing on the building's roof, located approximately 180 feet above street level.

Profit's exploration of Gracen & Gracen's computer network was done through a 3D-image rendering interface, which represents G&G's corporate data as a building with a series of offices. This was implemented using the Virtual Reality Modeling Language which was believed to be the way that future websites would be built in 1996. In the years leading up to the production of Profit numerous films such as The Lawnmower Man, Virtuosity, and especially the corporate thriller Disclosure, featured a virtual reality interface which directly inspired its use in Profit.

== Unused story lines ==
David Greenwalt and John McNamara gave details of plotlines from the never-produced second season in the audio commentaries on the Region 1 DVD.

- Joanne Meltzer dies early in the first episode of the second season while in Ireland looking into Profit's background. The phone booth from which she is calling Sykes is set to explode. There is a bomb planted there by the Irish Republican Army. It was to be revealed later that this was done at the behest of Profit.
- Jim has stolen the identity of a "real" Jim Profit. The "real" Jim Profit is in a coma after he was drowned by the protagonist Jim Profit. Later on, the protagonist would return to finish killing his alias.
- Charles "Chaz" Gracen has a heart attack while running on his treadmill due to a mild poison Profit slips into Chaz's water bottle. Profit eventually convinces Chaz that his father (who is the Chairman of G&G's board of directors) is trying to kill him.
- Profit engineers the death of Chaz and Pete Gracen's father to help the two brothers reconcile their differences, eliminate a troublemaker on G&G's Board of Directors, and help tighten Profit's control over G&G.
- Another storyline involved Profit getting a current Senator drunk to the point of blackout, staging a car accident, and convincing the Senator that he had killed someone. These events probably led into a related story line in which Pete Gracen becomes a Senator himself.
- Pete and Nora Gracen would have divorced.

In 2001 it was reported that co-creator David Greenwalt, who later went on to produce the Buffy the Vampire Slayer spin-off series Angel, once entertained the idea of having Adrian Pasdar reprise his role as Jim Profit on Angel. The main villains in Angel were a law firm called Wolfram & Hart, and Profit would have joined the firm. Conflicting working schedules with Pasdar (then the lead on NBC's Mysterious Ways), and the predictable difficulties in securing the rights to use the Jim Profit character prevented this from happening before Angel's run ended in its fifth and final season in 2004.

== Notes ==
- According to the 2005 DVD releases’ "Greed Kills" featurette, McNamara and Greenwalt developed the concept for Profit after McNamara attended a local (i.e., L.A.) touring production of Richard III (in modern dress and set in the 1930s) featuring Sir Ian McKellen.
- In the audio commentary of the 2005 Region 1 DVD, McNamara and Greenwalt indicated that Fox executives requested that the character of Bobbi Stakowski be changed from being Profit's biological mother to the somewhat less-inflammatory status of being his step-mother.
- The corporate scandal that Jim Profit leaks to the press in the pilot episode was based on a real scandal for the Beech-Nut Nutrition Corporation in the 1980s, in which the company pled guilty to 215 felony counts and paid an unprecedented $2.2 USD million dollar fine for shipping millions of jars of baby food that did not contain 100% apple juice as advertised. Two Beech-Nut executives were also personally fined $100k USD each, and one of them spent a year in jail.
- According to the "Greed Kills" featurette, Profit's traumatic upbringing was based on research Greenwalt had done on the childhood of a real-life serial killer (who had been similarly raised in a box, with only a television present to "raise" him), as described in the nonfiction novel Whoever Fights Monsters: My Twenty Years Tracking Serial Killers for the FBI by Robert K. Ressler & Tom Shachtman. The relevant passage is located in Chapter 4 titled Childhoods of Violence: "One woman propped her infant son in a cardboard box in front of the television set, and left for work; later, she'd put him in a playpen, toss in some food, and let the TV set be the baby-sitter until she came home again."
- Stephen J. Cannell, executive producer of Profit, admitted the name "Profit" is a bit of homage to the crazed Mel Profitt character (portrayed by Kevin Spacey) in Cannell's critically acclaimed Wiseguy TV series.
- Stephen J. Cannell reportedly was "shopping" a revival of Profit around July 1996, and said that the cable network Showtime had "shown some interest". A Showtime original series with some similarity to Profit called Dexter premiered in 2006; since then Dexter has received numerous awards and widespread critical acclaim. Lisa Darr, who played Profit's assistant Gail Koner, had a small role as a defense attorney in the season-four premiere episode, "Living the Dream". In the episode, Darr's character is cross-examining the title character (Dexter Morgan) and destroying his credibility on the stand. Sherman Augustus, who played Profit's male rival Jeffrey Sykes, also had a small role on Dexter as "Benjamin Caffrey" in the season 7 episode Helter Skelter.

== Cultural references ==
- The feature film Cement directed by Adrian Pasdar featured a scene where the character Fergus watches part of the pilot episode of Profit on a TV. Fergus says "It's 8:00, time for Profit"; 8:00pm was the original time-slot for Profit in the Central/Mountain time zone when it first aired on Fox. The scene also includes numerous shots of a fish tank similar to the one located in Profit's apartment.
- The character of Joséphine Karlsson from the French TV series Engrenages (Spiral) was directly inspired by Jim Profit according to series producer Alain Clert.

== Possible revival ==
- In mid-2018 Adrian Pasdar stated that a reboot of Profit was under development by director/producer Tawnia McKiernan, daughter of Stephen J. Cannell.
