= Vengeance Unlimited =

- Created by: John McNamara; David Simkins
- Starring: Kathleen York; Michael Madsen
- Opening theme: Mark Morgan
- Composer: Mark Morgan
- Country of origin: United States
- No. of seasons: 1
- No. of episodes: 16

Production
- Executive producer: John McNamara
- Running time: 60 minutes
- Production companies: McNamara Paper Products; Warner Bros. Television

Original release
- Network: ABC
- Release: September 29, 1998 – February 25, 1999

Vengeance Unlimited is an American crime drama series broadcast during 1998–1999 on ABC which lasted for one season of sixteen episodes. The show starred Michael Madsen and Kathleen York.

== Premise ==
Mr. Chapel was a mysterious stranger keen on serving justice to those who had been ignored by the law. To achieve those ends, Mr. Chapel made use of promised favors from former clients. People in trouble were usually contacted by Chapel with an envelope on their front doorstep containing newspaper clippings related to previous clients, along with the phone number 555-0132. When Mr. Chapel took a case, his demand was simple: either pay a fee of one million dollars, or promise to do a favor at some time in the future—whatever, whenever, wherever and for however long he needed you—then your debt would be paid in full. In the series pilot, it was clear that Mr. Chapel had been doing this for some time, as he called in a number of favors to help his current client.

A running joke throughout the series was whenever one of those former clients paid their debt to Mr. Chapel's satisfaction, he would say, "We're even. I'm out of your life. Forever." The client would invariably respond, "Thank God!" Some favors are ongoing, such as the one owed from Boone Paladin, owner of The Paladin Motel chain, who grants Chapel permanent guest status in all of his motels. K.C. Griffin (York), a woman who worked in the district attorney's office, was the one former client who stayed after doing her one favor, and continued to assist Chapel with his cases.

Chapel made few promises. Those that he did make, he would fulfill (or die trying). Though he had no compunctions about using lethal force if necessary, Chapel refused entirely to use guns. Current clients were sent away, if at all possible, to keep them out of the line of fire (and provide them plausible deniability). There are hints throughout the series that Chapel began his crusade after suffering a traumatic personal tragedy.

== Production ==
In February 1998, it was announced John McNamara had signed an exclusive development and production deal with Warner Bros. Television, the first project of which would be pilot Vengeance Unlimited which McNamara wrote with David Simkins for ABC.

== Episodes ==
No.	Title	Directed by	Written by	Original release date
1	"Cruel and Unusual"	James Frawley	John McNamara & David Simkins	September 29, 1998
2	"Victim of Circumstances"	James Frawley	Charles D. Holland	October 1, 1998
Mr. Chapel goes after an FBI profiler (Keith Szarabajka) who suppressed evidence that proves the innocence of a wrongfully convicted man.
3	"Eden"	James Frawley	John McNamara	October 8, 1998
4	"Bitter End"	Lou Antonio	David Simkins	October 15, 1998
5	"Justice"	Bill Norton	Wendy Battles	October 22, 1998
6	"Ambition"	James Frawley	Story by : Gary Rieck; Teleplay by : John McNamara	October 29, 1998
7	"Security"	Mel Damski	Tom Chenak	December 10, 1998
8	"Dishonorable Discharge"	Bobby Roth	Valerie Mayhew & Vivian Mayhew	December 17, 1998
9	"Noir"	John Patterson	Valerie Mayhew & Vivian Mayhew	December 24, 1998
10	"Vendetta"	Adam Nimoy	Charles D. Holland	January 7, 1999
11	"Confidence"	Alan J. Levi	Kim Newton	January 14, 1999
12	"Judgment"	James Frawley	John McNamara & David Simkins	January 21, 1999
13	"Clique"	Bobby Roth	Kim Newton & Wendy Battles	January 28, 1999
14	"Critical"	James Frawley	Valerie Mayhew & Vivian Mayhew	February 4, 1999
15	"Legalese"	Bill Norton	Charles D. Holland	February 11, 1999
16	"Friends"	Perry Lang	Kim Newton	February 25, 1999

== Ratings and cancellation ==
Although Vengeance Unlimited saw improved ratings in its Thursday night time slot in comparison to ABC's Nothing Sacred which had previously held the slot, its ratings were deemed disappointing.

The show was canceled by ABC, after ranking only 109th out of 156 shows, with an average viewership of just 7.1 million viewers. The show ranked 4th in its timeslot, being beaten by NBC's Friends (2nd, 23.5 million) and Jesse (4th, 20.1 million), CBS's Promised Land (51st, 11.5 million), and FOX's World's Wildest Police Videos (77th, 9.6 million). However, the show did beat out UPN's Thursday Night at the Movies (145th, 2.5 million) and The WB's The Wayans Bros. (134th, 3.5 million) and The Jamie Foxx Show (129th, 3.8 million).

== Reception ==
In a review for The New York Times, Anita Gates was positive in her assessment describing the series as a smart drama and praising Michael Madsen's lead performance as Mr. Chapel. In a more mixed review for The Washington Post, Tom Shales wrote the series came off as a less civilized version of The Equalizer, but did admit the series had a "thuggish charm". In a review for Variety, Ray Richmond panned the show calling it mean-spirited and unsettling and taking issue with the series' overly cavalier attitude and seeming endorsement of vigilantism.
