= Spy Game (TV series) =

American action-adventure television series

- Genre: Action-adventure/Drama
- Created by: Sam Raimi; Ivan Raimi; John McNamara
- Written by: Scott Brown; Anne Collins; John McNamara; Kathy McCormick; Eric Morris; Gene F. O'Neill; David Simkins; Noreen Tobin; Jeff Vlaming
- Directed by: Lou Antonio; James Frawley; Elodie Keene; Winrich Kolbe; John T. Kretchmer; Les Landau; Doug Lefler; Alan J. Levi; Jefery Levy; Martha Mitchell; T.J. Scott; Oz Scott
- Starring: Linden Ashby; Allison Smith; Bruce McCarty; Keith Szarabajka; D.D. Howard
- Composer: Christophe Beck
- Country of origin: United States
- Original language: English
- No. of seasons: 1
- No. of episodes: 13 (4 unaired)

Production
- Executive producers: John McNamara; Sam Raimi; Robert G. Tapert
- Producer: Edward Ledding
- Cinematography: Stephen McNutt
- Running time: 60 minutes (with commercials)
- Production companies: McNamara Paper Products, Inc. Renaissance Pictures; Warner Bros. Television; Universal Television

Original release
- Network: ABC
- Release: March 3 – July 12, 1997

Spy Game is an American action-adventure television series that aired on ABC for 13 episodes during the spring and summer of 1997. The series was created by screenwriter and physician Ivan Raimi, director Sam Raimi, and writer John McNamara. The series was originally developed under the title Cloak and Dagger, but was renamed prior to airing.

== Plot ==
The series starred Linden Ashby as Lorne Cash, a retired secret agent who reluctantly agrees to get back into the "spy game" and work for a secret government agency. Following the collapse of the former Soviet Union and the downsizing of international intelligence agencies worldwide, the reduced demand for highly qualified espionage agents has flooded the civilian market with displaced former agents. With the surplus of independent agents running rogue operations, Cash is called in to work with a meager agency whose sole directive is to police these newly freelance spies.

Cash contrasts his partner, Max London, played by Allison Smith in their "low" vs. "high" tech approaches to problems. Cash is an expert martial artist and was trained to improvise by re-purposing objects in his environment as tools or weapons; conversely, Max prefers to arm herself with the latest cutting-edge technology and gadgets, which occasionally puts them at odds. For example, when disabling a camera system, Max speculates about defeating it with electronic jamming, while Cash simply puts a post-it note over the lens. Alternately, Cash may spend considerable time trying to defeat an opponent in hand-to-hand, while Max will simply use a tranquilizer gun.

Despite initial friction, the two quickly establish a rapport (with the usual romantic overtures). Some of the show's humor is generated from Lorne's reluctance to use modern gadgets, as well as the occasional revelations about his past and his high connections. In the premiere episode, for example, Lorne calls the president who is a personal friend and is given a security clearance higher than his boss'.

The series was a throwback to the stylish spy series of the 1960s, with particular comparison being made to The Avengers and The Man from U.N.C.L.E., while at the same time poking fun at the genre. (The opening credits were a parody of the opening credits of The Avengers.) The show's first episode featured cameos by numerous stars of spy shows of the past (including Patrick Macnee and Robert Culp).

Spy Game was canceled after nine of the thirteen episodes produced were aired.

== Cast ==
- Linden Ashby as Lorne Cash
- Allison Smith as Maxine "Max" London
- Bruce McCarty as Micah Simms
- Keith Szarabajka as Shank
- D.D. Howard as Yolanda Trench
- Barney McFadden as Jack Hendricks (recurring role)

== Production ==
As John McNamara was a fan of spy TV shows, McNamara created Spy Game with the intention of making something similar to I Spy and The Avengers. While McNamara enjoyed working on the series, he admitted that he felt it took the show too long to find a balance in tone and identity before the audience and network lost patience.

John McNamara, who had a contract with Warner Bros. Television, partnered with Sam Raimi and Robert Tapert of Universal Television via Renaissance Pictures to produce the series.

== Episodes ==
No.	Title	Directed by	Written by	Original release date	Prod. code
1	"Why Spy?"	Elodie Keene	John McNamara	March 3, 1997	K2101
2	"With Friends Like These"	Lou Antonio	Eric Morris	March 10, 1997	K2105
3	"Nobody Ever Said Growing Up Was Easy"	Doug Lefler	Gene O'Neill & Noreen Tobin	March 17, 1997	K2104
4	"Dead and Gone Honey"	James Frawley	Anne Collins	June 7, 1997	K2108
5	"You Just Can't Trust Anyone These Days"	Martha Mitchell	Scott Brown & Eric Morris	June 14, 1997	K2113
6	"What, Micah Worry?"	Alan J. Levi	David Simkins	June 21, 1997	K2112
7	"What Family Doesn't Have Its Ups and Downs"	Les Landau	Gene O'Neill & Noreen Tobin	June 28, 1997	K2111
8	"And That About Concludes Our Session"	T.J. Scott	John McNamara	July 5, 1997	K2102
9	"Lorne and Max Drop the Ball"	Jefery Levy	Kathy McCormick	July 12, 1997	K2106
10	"Go, Girl"	Doug Lefler	David Simkins	UNAIRED	K2103
11	"Necessity is the Mother of Infection"	Winrich Kolbe	Scott Brown	UNAIRED	K2107
12	"How Diplomatic of You"	John T. Kretchmer	Story by : Jeff Vlaming; Teleplay by : John McNamara & Kathy McCormick	UNAIRED	K2108
13	"Well, Nothing to Fear But Death Itself"	Winrich Kolbe	Scott Brown	UNAIRED	K2110

Though the last four episodes were never aired in the USA, they were shown overseas, for instance by Channel 4 in the UK (though very late at night), or in France by France 2 channel in September 2000.

== Broadcast ==
Spy Game premiered as a Mid-season replacement for ABC's Dangerous Minds. After airing its first three episodes, Spy Game was pulled from the schedule and replaced with the return of Relativity with the remaining 10 episodes of Spy Game to be possibly burned off during the Summer.
