= Eyes (TV series) =

- Genre: Crime drama
- Created by: John McNamara
- Starring: Tim Daly; Garcelle Beauvais; A. J. Langer; Laura Leighton; Eric Mabius; Rick Worthy; Natalie Zea
- Country of origin: United States
- Original language: English
- No. of seasons: 1
- No. of episodes: 12 (7 unaired)

Production
- Executive producer: John McNamara
- Running time: 60 minutes
- Production companies: McNamara Paper Products; Warner Bros. Television

Original release
- Network: ABC
- Release: March 30 – April 27, 2005

Eyes is an American crime drama television series starring Tim Daly as Harlan Judd that aired on ABC from March 30 to April 27, 2005.

In May 2005, having rescheduled the sixth episode twice, ABC announced that they would not be airing the remaining episodes until June at the earliest. They later announced that it would not be picked up for a second season and that the remaining episodes would remain unaired.

New Zealand television station TV2 picked up this show and aired the complete series, all twelve episodes, in the second half of 2005. These episodes appeared online via BitTorrent soon after. The show was also partially aired on Singapore television station Mediacorp Channel 5, with the pilot episode and episodes #106 to #112 being skipped. Episode #111 ("Burglary") was an exception, and was aired as the fifth episode. The show was also aired in full on France cable television station Canal Jimmy in 2006. In the beginning of 2008 the show was aired in full on Polish television station TVN 7. The series was scheduled to be shown on the Nine Network in Australia in late 2005 but the network declined to air the series due to its cancellation in the US.

Episodes could formerly be seen for free on the website In2TV. Not all episodes were available (including the pilot episode), but most unaired episodes were online.

In March 2009 American satellite broadcaster DirecTV announced a deal made with Warner Bros. to show all episodes of the series on its The 101 Network channel. Eyes airing on DirecTV began on September 15, 2009.

== Premise ==
The series follows the firm of Judd Risk Management in Los Angeles, California which uses marginally legal means to investigate individuals and crimes where law enforcement would fall short. With the help of high-tech gadgets, Harlan Judd and his employees recover money for victims as well as investigate individuals for clients but still manage to keep plenty of secrets from one another.

== Cast and characters ==
- Tim Daly as Harlan Judd
- Garcelle Beauvais as Nora Gage
- A. J. Langer as Meg Bardo
- Laura Leighton as Leslie Town
- Eric Mabius as Jeff McCann
- Rick Worthy as Chris Didion
- Natalie Zea as Trish Agermeyer

== Episodes ==
No.	Title	Directed by	Written by	Original release date
1	"Pilot"	Jon Amiel	John McNamara	March 30, 2005
2	"Whereabouts"	Peter Ellis	John Belluso	April 6, 2005
3	"Wings"	J. Miller Tobin	Bonnie Mark	April 13, 2005
4	"Trial"	Fred Keller	Tom Smuts	April 20, 2005
5	"Shots"	Robert Duncan McNeill	Sera Gamble & Raelle Tucker	April 27, 2005
6	"Innocence"	Chris Long	Aaron Zelman	UNAIRED
7	"Whistleblower"	Marcos Siega	Tom Smuts & John Belluso	UNAIRED
8	"Art"	Michael Zinberg	Sera Gamble & Raelle Tucker	UNAIRED
9	"Poison"	Tawnia McKiernan	Story by : Evangeline Ordaz; Teleplay by : John McNamara & Evangeline Ordaz	UNAIRED
10	"Investigator"	Jesús Salvador Treviño	C.E. Krell	UNAIRED
11	"Burglary"	Chris Long	Aaron Zelman	UNAIRED
12	"Karma"	Tawnia McKiernan	John McNamara	UNAIRED

== See also ==
- Private investigator
