= Rick Worthy =

American actor (born 1967)

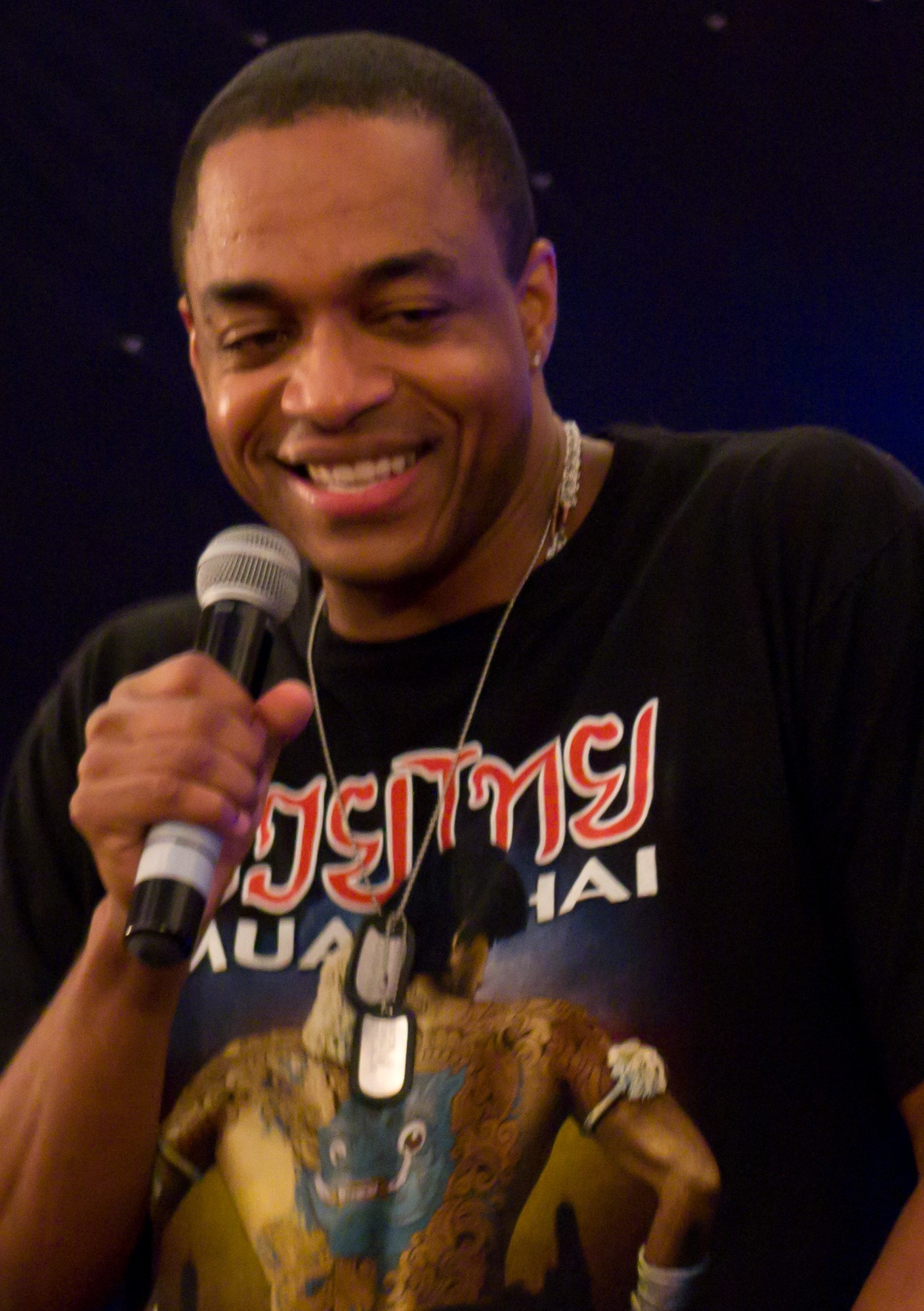
- Worthy in 2013
- Born: Richard Worthy; March 12, 1967 (age 59); Detroit, Michigan, U.S.
- Education: University of Michigan School of Music, Theatre & Dance (1990)
- Occupation: Actor
- Years active: 1993–present

Richard Worthy (born March 12, 1967) is an American actor, known particularly for appearing in a variety of science fiction and fantasy television shows. He is perhaps best known for his role as Henry Fogg as the Dean of Brakebills on The Magicians, where he was a regular cast member, as well as his reoccurring role as Simon O'Neill, Cylon model number four, in the reimagined Battlestar Galactica.

He had a recurring role on The Man in the High Castle and also appeared as six different characters across three Star Trek spin-off series and one feature film.

== Early life and education ==
Worthy, who is of African American heritage, was born in Detroit, Michigan; his father worked in the automotive industry. Worthy studied Tae Kwon Do at a young age. He graduated from Southfield Senior High School in 1985 and from the University of Michigan School of Music, Theatre & Dance in 1990.

== Career ==
Worthy became a stage actor in Detroit, then moving to Chicago to develop his theatrical skills. Later, he moved to Los Angeles, California with the goal of acting in film and television.

His first big break came as an orderly in While You Were Sleeping in 1995.

In the same year he played Rickey Latrell, a basketball player accused of murder, on the television show Murder One in 1996.

He played Nathan Jackson on the 1998–99 TV show The Magnificent Seven.

He has had several roles within the Star Trek franchise. He has played several aliens, and one human, in Star Trek: Deep Space Nine, Star Trek: Voyager and Star Trek: Enterprise. He also had a supporting role in the 1998 film Star Trek: Insurrection.

He guest-starred in "The Warrior", a 2001 episode of Stargate SG-1, where he made use of his Tae Kwon Do and stunt fighting skills as the Goa'uld Imhotep.

He appeared on the 2003–09 re-imagined version of Battlestar Galactica as Cylon model number Four, often referred to as "Simon".

He worked on a short-lived 2005 private-eye drama on ABC, Eyes.

He had a large role on the 2006 ABC Family miniseries Fallen.

Worthy appeared in four episodes of Heroes in 2009, playing "Mike", Matt Parkman's partner, an experienced and capable Los Angeles cop. He also had a part in the TV series Supernatural, playing the unnamed Alpha Vampire in two episodes of Season 6, one episode of season 7 and one episode of season 12.

Worthy appeared on NCIS in 2012 as Navy Captain Logan Doyle.

Worthy was featured in the 2012 documentary That Guy... Who Was in That Thing, about character actors.

== Filmography ==
Film
Year	Film	Role	Notes
1994	Richie Rich	News Reporter	
1995	Losing Isaiah	Alley Man	
1995	While You Were Sleeping	Orderly	
1995	Eye of the Stalker	Eric, Adobe Photoshop	TV movie
1996	Star Trek: Klingon	(voice)	Video game
1996	The Rockford Files: Godfather Knows Best	Property Officer	TV movie
1996	The Trigger Effect	Johnny	
1997	Steel	SWAT Man	
1998	Star Trek: Insurrection	Elloran Officer #1	
2001	Earth Angels	Gregory	TV movie
2001	Antitrust	Shrot's Assistant	
2002	Collateral Damage	Ronnie	
2003	Holes	Male Officer	
2004	X-Men Legends	Acolyte #2/Man #2 (voice)	Video game
2006	Fallen	Camael	TV movie
2009	See Kate Run	Matt Jenkins	TV movie
2009	Duplicity	Dale Raimes	
2009	The Plan	Simon	Video
2012	That Guy... Who Was in That Thing	Himself	
Television
Year	Title	Role	Notes
1993	Missing Persons	Russell Findlay	Episode: "Right Neighborhood... Wrong Door"
1995	Tough Target	Robber #2	Episode: "Dana Feitler"
1996	NYPD Blue	Det. Elkins	Episode: "Burnin' Love"
1996	Murder One	Rickey Latrell	8 episodes (1996–1997)
1996	Star Trek: Voyager	Crewman Noah Lessing, 3947, Cravic 122	3 episodes (1996–1999)
1997	Star Trek: Deep Space Nine	Kornan	Episode: "Soldiers of the Empire"
1997	The Gregory Hines Show	Will Jones	Episode: "Basketball Jones"
1998	Maximum Bob	Lionel	Episode: "Once Bitten..."
1998	The Magnificent Seven	Nathan Jackson	22 episodes (1998–2000)
1999	Touched by an Angel	James	Episode: "Black Like Monica"
2000	City of Angels	Mr. Walker	Episode: "Unhand Me"
2000	The Hughleys	Byrno	Episode: "The Thin Black Line"
2000	Seven Days	Sergeant Grubbs	Episode: "Peacekeepers"
2001	Felicity	Jeremy Cavallo	4 episodes (2001)
2002	Stargate SG-1	K'tano	Episode: "The Warrior"
2002	Any Day Now	Hospital Administrator	Episode: "Call Him Macaroni"
2002	Sheena	Mako Zabodi	Episode: "Return of the Native"
2002	Dark Angel	Lieutenant Clemente	Episode: "Freak Nation"
2002	Odyssey 5	Dr. Travelor / John Miles	Episode: "The Choices We Make"
2003	Boomtown	Malcolm Barker	Episode: "Fearless"
2003	The Lyon's Den	Mr. Carlisle	Episode: "Trick or Treat"
2003	CSI: Crime Scene Investigation	Dr. Stewart	4 episodes (2003–2010)
2003	Star Trek: Enterprise	Jannar	10 episodes (2003–2004)
2004	CSI: Miami	Thomas Kincaid	Episode: "Witness to Murder"
2005	Eyes	Chris Dillon	12 episodes (2005–2007)
2005	Battlestar Galactica	Simon	8 episodes (2005–2009)
2005	Grey's Anatomy	Ray Pelletier	Episode: "Fear (of the Unknown)" Season 10
2007	Fallen	Camael	3 episodes (2007)
2007	Journeyman	Gus	Episode: "The Hanged Man"
2008	Eli Stone	Leonard Dupler	Episode: "Soul Free"
2008	Brothers & Sisters	Officer Collins	Episode: "Tug of War"
2009	Saving Grace	Special Agent Dave Daniels	Episode: "Do You Believe in Second Chances?"
2009	The Mentalist	Terry Andrews	Episode: "Bloodshot"
2009	Heroes	Mike	4 episodes (2009)
2010	Medium	The Regal Man	Episode: "Dear Dad..."
2010	Castle	Jason Penn	Episode: "A Deadly Game"
2010–2017	Supernatural	Alpha Vampire	4 episodes
2011	Against the Wall	-	Episode: "Second Chances"
2012	NCIS	Captain Logan Doyle	Episode: "Lost at Sea"
2013	The Vampire Diaries	Rudy Hopkins	7 episodes
2015–2019	The Man in the High Castle	Lemuel "Lem" Washington	
2015–2020	The Magicians	Dean Henry Fogg	
2025	Washington Black	Drunk John	
