= That Guy... Who Was in That Thing =

- Film poster
- Directed by: Ian Roumain; Michael Schwartz
- Music by: Craig Stuart Garfinkle
- Country of origin: United States
- Original language: English

Production
- Producers: Ian Roumain; Michael Schwartz; Brian Volk-Weiss
- Editor: Michael Schwartz

Original release
- Release: 2012

That Guy... Who Was in That Thing is a 2012 documentary film by Ian Roumain and Michael Schwartz that features sixteen male character actors discussing their careers as working actors below the film star level but who are often recognized as being "that guy" who was in "that thing". Two talent agents also comment on the challenges faced by such actors.

The film was produced by Roumain, Schwartz and Brian Volk-Weiss for New Wave Entertainment. Doug Shanaberger described it as a "wonderful new documentary", saying: "If you're wondering who they are, that's half the point. But you'll recognize them, and that's the other half."

A sequel, That Gal... Who Was in That Thing, focused on similarly lesser-known but familiar character actresses, including Catherine Hicks, Alicia Coppola and Roxanne Hart, was released on Showtime in March 2015.

== Featured actors ==
- Željko Ivanek
- Xander Berkeley
- Craig Fairbrass
- Bruce Davison
- Timothy Omundson
- Mark Rolston
- Wade Williams
- J. C. MacKenzie
- Robert Joy
- Stanley Kamel (who died after filming was completed)
- Rick Worthy
- Paul Guilfoyle
- Gregory Itzin
- W. Morgan Sheppard
- Zach Grenier
- Matt Malloy
