= Tawnia McKiernan =

American television director

- Born: Tawnia Cannell
- Occupations: Director, producer
- Years active: 1996–present
- Spouse: Timothy McKiernan
- Father: Stephen J. Cannell

Tawnia McKiernan is an American television director and producer. Since the mid-1990s she has amassed a number of directorial credits. She is also the daughter of late television producer Stephen J. Cannell.

== Career ==
McKiernan made her directorial debut on the series Renegade directing two episodes, she then directed four episodes of Silk Stalkings. Both series were produced by her father Stephen J. Cannell. Her other television work include V.I.P., Hunter (revival series), 10-8: Officers on Duty, NYPD Blue, Jonny Zero, The Closer, Blue Bloods, Bones, Las Vegas, E-Ring, Windfall, Eyes, Close to Home, Women's Murder Club, ER, Army Wives, Terminator: The Sarah Connor Chronicles, Monk, In Plain Sight, Royal Pains, Warehouse 13, Psych, The Mentalist, Criminal Minds, Blindspot, NCIS , and The Walking Dead.

In 2012, she directed the TV movie Secrets of Eden starring John Stamos.

She is a co-chair member of the Directors Guild of America.

In 2016, she was to have become the writer of the FOX revival of the series The A-Team, but that series has not materialized.
