= John McNamara (writer) =

American screenwriter (born 1962)

- Born: John Paul Flannagan McNamara; April 2, 1962 (age 64); Ann Arbor, Michigan, U.S.
- Education: University of Michigan
- Occupations: Producer, screenwriter

John McNamara (born April 2, 1962) is an American writer, producer, showrunner and television creator. He attended East Grand Rapids High School located in Michigan and attended the University of Michigan and New York University. While at NYU, he wrote two children's books published by Delacorte Press and a teleplay for the CBS Afternoon Playhouse.

== Career ==
He is co-creator of a short-lived television series called Profit which ran on the Fox network in April 1996, as well as Vengeance Unlimited for ABC in 1998 and Fastlane for Fox in 2002. Although he had a contract with Warner Bros. Television, he collaborated with Sam Raimi and Robert Tapert of Universal Television via Renaissance Pictures to make Spy Game for ABC. In 1998, his McNamara Paper Products company signed an exclusive deal with Warner Bros. Television to develop scripted programming.

McNamara went on to executive produce several other television shows, including The Fugitive (a remake from 2000 to 2001 season) and Eyes. After nearly a decade working at Warner Bros., he moved to CBS Paramount Television in 2006 for a two-year overall deal. In 2007, he served a stint as Consulting Producer on the series Jericho. In 2010, McNamara joined the production of In Plain Sight as Executive Producer for Season 3.

McNamara was the supervising producer for 23 episodes of the TV show Lois & Clark: The New Adventures of Superman. He worked on the NBC show Aquarius that stars David Duchovny and on the Syfy series The Magicians based on the bestselling Lev Grossman novel of the same name.

McNamara wrote and co-produced the feature film Trumbo, for which Bryan Cranston was nominated for an Academy Award, as Dalton Trumbo, one of The Hollywood Ten blacklisted screenwriters. The film, directed by Jay Roach, was released on November 6, 2015.

== Awards and honors ==
His play Present Tense won the first annual Young Playwrights' competition and was then produced off-Broadway. Trumbo was nominated for the Writers Guild of America Award for Best Adapted Screenplay and McNamara was awarded the WGAW's Paul Selvin Award in 2016 which honors writers whose work “embodies the spirit of the constitutional and civil right liberties that are indispensable to the survival of free writers everywhere.”

== Filmography ==
=== As a TV producer ===
- Parent Trap: Hawaiian Honeymoon (1989, ABC) (co-producer)
- The Adventures of Brisco County, Jr. (FOX, 1993) (Producer)
- Lois & Clark: The New Adventures of Superman (ABC, 1993–1997) (Supervising Producer)
- Profit (FOX, 1996–1997) (Executive Producer)
- Spy Game (ABC, 1997) (Executive Producer)
- Vengeance Unlimited (ABC, 1998) (Executive Producer)
- The Fugitive (CBS, 2000–2001) (Executive Producer)
- Fastlane (FOX, 2002–2003) (Executive Producer)
- Eyes (ABC, 2005) (Executive Producer)
- Orpheus (USA, 2006) (Executive Producer)
- Them (FOX, 2007) (Executive Producer)
- Jericho (CBS, 2008) (Consulting Producer)
- The Philanthropist (NBC, 2009) (Consulting Producer)
- In Plain Sight (USA, 2010) (Executive Producer)
- Prime Suspect (NBC, 2011–2012) (Executive Producer)
- Common Law (USA, 2012) (Consulting Producer)
- Aquarius (NBC, 2015–2016) (Creator, Executive Producer)
- The Magicians (Syfy, 2015–2020) (Creator, Executive Producer)
- Physical (AppleTV+, 2021–2023) (Executive Producer)
- NCIS: Tony & Ziva (Paramount+, 2025) (Creator, Executive Producer)

=== As a TV writer ===
- CBS Afternoon Playhouse (1983, CBS)
- Walt Disney's Wonderful World of Color (1987, ABC)
- Save the Dog! (1988, USA)
- Parent Trap: Hawaiian Honeymoon (1989, ABC)
- The Adventures of Brisco County, Jr. (FOX, 1993)
- Lois & Clark: The New Adventures of Superman (ABC, 1993–1997)
- Profit (FOX, 1996–1997)
- Spy Game (ABC, 1997)
- Vengeance Unlimited (ABC, 1998)
- The Fugitive (USA, 2000–2001)
- Fastlane (FOX, 2002–2003)
- Eyes (ABC, 2005–2007)
- Them (FOX, 2007)
- The Philanthropist (NBC, 2009)
- In Plain Sight (USA, 2010)
- Prime Suspect (NBC, 2011–2012)
- Common Law (USA, 2012)
- Aquarius (NBC, 2015)
- The Magicians (Syfy, 2015–2020)
- NCIS: Tony & Ziva (Paramount+, 2025)
