= The Magicians (American TV series) =

2015 American fantasy television series

- Genre: Fantasy
- Created by: Sera Gamble; John McNamara
- Based on: The Magicians by Lev Grossman
- Starring: Jason Ralph; Stella Maeve; Olivia Taylor Dudley; Hale Appleman; Arjun Gupta; Summer Bishil; Rick Worthy; Jade Tailor; Brittany Curran; Trevor Einhorn
- Composer: Will Bates
- Country of origin: United States
- Original language: English
- No. of seasons: 5
- No. of episodes: 65 (list of episodes)

Production
- Executive producers: Mike Cahill; Michael London; Janice Williams; Scott Smith; John McNamara; Sera Gamble; Henry Alonso Myers
- Producer: Mitch Engel
- Production locations: New Orleans, Louisiana (pilot); Vancouver, British Columbia
- Cinematography: Vanja Cernjul; Elie Smolkin
- Editors: Sue Blanely; Jason Courson; Mats Abbott; Rita K. Sanders
- Running time: 41–52 minutes
- Production companies: McNamara Moving Company; Man Sewing Dinosaur; Groundswell Productions; Universal Content Productions (Note: Credited as Universal Cable Productions in seasons 1 through 4)

Original release
- Network: Syfy
- Release: December 16, 2015 – April 1, 2020

The Magicians is an American fantasy television series that aired on Syfy, based on the trilogy of novels by Lev Grossman. Michael London, Janice Williams, John McNamara, and Sera Gamble serve as executive producers. A 13-episode order was placed for the first season in May 2015, and the series premiered on December 16, 2015, as a special preview. In January 2019, Syfy renewed the series for a fifth, which ran from January 15 to April 1, 2020, following the announcement of the series' cancellation. In the show, students at a secretive school of magic find that the magical world is more dangerous than they realized.

== Premise ==
Quentin Coldwater enrolls at Brakebills University for Magical Pedagogy to be trained as a magician, where he discovers that the magical world from his favorite childhood book is real and poses a danger to humanity. Meanwhile, the life of his childhood friend Julia is derailed when she is denied entry, and she searches for magic elsewhere outside of the school.

== Cast and characters ==
=== Main ===
- Jason Ralph as Quentin Coldwater (seasons 1–4), a graduate student. He enrolls at Brakebills University for Magical Pedagogy to be trained as a magician. A lifelong fan of the Fillory and Further series, he discovers that the books are in fact based in truths that pose a danger to his world.
- Stella Maeve as Julia Wicker, Quentin's childhood friend, an Ivy League student who is not admitted to Brakebills, and is recruited by hedge witches, largely self-taught magicians who have to piece together spells.
  - Maeve also portrays the sister of the Monster at the End of the World, inhabiting Julia's body, in season 4.
- Olivia Taylor Dudley as Alice Quinn, a naturally gifted magician whose parents are magicians and who comes from a neglected home life.
- Hale Appleman as Eliot Waugh, a student at Brakebills and senior to Quentin, with whom he is close friends. He is a heavy drinker. He and Margo are inseparable.
  - Appleman also portrays the Monster at the End of the World inhabiting Eliot's body in season 4.
- Arjun Gupta as William "Penny" Adiyodi, Quentin's roommate and peer. He is a talented magician who is a telepath and "traveler", someone who can travel between worlds. Despite his brusque demeanor, Penny is loyal to his friends.
- Summer Bishil as Margo Hanson, equivalent to Janet from the novels. Her name was changed to avoid confusion with other names beginning with "J". She is close friends with Eliot and is very charismatic.
- Rick Worthy as Henry Fogg (seasons 2–5; recurring season 1), the dean of Brakebills.
- Jade Tailor as Kady Orloff-Diaz (seasons 2–5; recurring season 1), a tough, rebellious Brakebills student who attracts Penny's attention in and out of the classroom. After she flees Brakebills, she joins a group of magicians led by Richard and befriends Julia.
- Brittany Curran as Fen (seasons 3–5; recurring season 2), Eliot's Fillorian wife.
- Trevor Einhorn as Josh Hoberman (seasons 3–5; recurring season 2; guest season 1), a former Brakebills student who was one of the members of a group that went missing.

=== Recurring ===
- Charles Shaughnessy as Christopher Plover (seasons 1, 4, 5), the reclusive author of the Fillory books and a childhood hero of Quentin's.
- Hannah Levien as Victoria Gradley (seasons 1, 3), a traveller and Brakebills student who was one of three survivors of a class trip to Fillory, and became a prisoner of the Beast.
- David Call as Pete (seasons 1, 4, 5), one of the confidants who welcome Julia into the clandestine underworld of hedge witches to develop her latent skills. He returns in season 4 and becomes Kady's new lieutenant.
- Michael Cassidy as James (season 1), Julia's boyfriend.
- Esmé Bianco as Jane Chatwin (season 1; guest season 3, 5), a character from the Fillory and Further novels who also appears to Quentin, helping to guide him on his magical journey. In the present, under the name Eliza, she had a hand in initiating Quentin's journey into real magic.
  - Rose Liston as young Jane Chatwin (season 1; guest season 3).
- Anne Dudek as Pearl Sunderland (seasons 1–2), a teacher at Brakebills and Penny's mentor.
- Kacey Rohl as Marina Andrieski, one of the hedge mages who welcome Julia into a clandestine underworld to develop her latent skills. Marina was expelled from Brakebills three months before graduation, and uses Julia to help her regain her memories of what she learned.
- Charles Mesure as Martin Chatwin / the Beast (seasons 1–2, 5), Jane and Rupert's brother, and former High King of Fillory. He later resurfaced as the master magician with six fingers who has taken over Fillory and breaks through to Earth. His head is usually magically obscured by a swarm of moths.
- Mackenzie Astin as Richard Corrigan (season 1) and Reynard the Fox (seasons 1–3). Corrigan was a magician and former member of the Free Trader Beowulf. Reynard is a Pagan trickster god and the son of Persephone who took over the body of Corrigan after the latter attempted to summon Persephone at the cost of his life.
- Keegan Connor Tracy as Professor Eleanor Lipson, a teacher at Brakebills specializing in magical healing. She works in the school's infirmary.
- Garcelle Beauvais as Persephone, a goddess better known as Our Lady Underground.
- Mageina Tovah as Zelda Schiff (season 2–5; guest season 1), the head librarian at the Library of the Neitherlands.
- Adam DiMarco as Todd (season 2–5; guest season 1), a student at Brakebills. It is revealed in season 4 that his name is actually Eliot and he was forced to go by his middle name because Eliot Waugh was unwilling to share the name.
- Rizwan Manji as Tick Pickwick (season 2–5), a royal advisor.
- Arlen Escarpeta as Prince Ess (season 2–3), a handsome, rugged, pelt-clad man and the entitled son of the ruler of Loria.
- Christopher Gorham as John Gaines (season 2), a senator who discovers he has unusual abilities.
- Harvey Guillén as Benedict Pickwick (season 2–3; guest season 5), a map-making servant of the court in Fillory, son of Tick Pickwick.
- Leonard Roberts as Idri (season 2–3), the King of Loria.
- Candis Cayne as the Fairy Queen (season 3; guest season 2), who forces Margo into her service after Margo's deal with the fairies.
- Marlee Matlin as Harriet Schiff (season 3–5; guest season 2), the head of Fuzzbeat, a clickbait website that surreptitiously provides magical knowledge, and later revealed to be the daughter of the librarian Zelda Schiff.
- Dustin Ingram as Hyman Cooper (seasons 3-5), known as the Pervert Ghost of Brakebills
- Dina Meyer as the Stone Queen (season 3), who wants Margo to marry her son.
- Jewel Staite as Phyllis (seasons 4–5), a librarian of the Neitherlands, then a member of the Governing Council.
- Felicia Day as Poppy Kline (seasons 3–4), a former Brakebills student whom Quentin comes across in Fillory.
- Jaime Ray Newman as Irene McAllistair (season 3), a member of the board of Brakebills who buys the school outright when the loss of magic threatens to close the university.
- Madeleine Arthur as Fray (season 3), presented by the Fairy Queen as the grown daughter of Eliot and Fen.
- Daniel Nemes as Gavin (season 3–5), a librarian of the Neitherlands, as well as a "traveler", meaning he can move between worlds within the multiverse.
- Jolene Purdy as Shoshana (season 4), a bright and highly emotional maenad, tasked with tending to notorious party god Bacchus.
- Camryn Manheim as Sheila (season 4), a resident magician of Modesto whom Alice befriends and to whom she teaches magic.
- Brian Markinson as Everett Rowe (season 4), leader of the Governing Council of the Order of the Library of the Neitherlands
- Sean Maguire as the Dark King (season 5), also known as Seb, and as Sir Effingham (season 5). The Dark King has become the mysterious High King of Fillory in the 300 years since Eliot and Margo were High Kings. Seb deposed and executed Josh and Fen, and took the throne for his own, in Eliot's and Margo's absence. He is the only magician powerful enough to defeat the Takers. Sir Effingham is a pig-like man from Fillory who travels to Earth hoping to recruit somebody to save Fillory.
- Spencer Daniels as Charlton (season 5; guest, seasons 3–4), a former host of the Monster at the End of the World. After the Monster possesses Eliot, Charlton is in Eliot's head and can only communicate with him. Eliot's prospective lover.
- Riann Steele as Plum Chatwin (season 5), a traveler and student in Penny's class, who soon starts helping him investigate a mysterious signal.
- Dominic Burgess as Ember (seasons 1-5), one of the two Ram-headed gods of Fillory, personifying Chaos, in hiding from the Beast.
- Nico Evers-Swindell as Umber (seasons 4-5), the second of the two Ram-headed gods of Fillory, personifying Order, initially missing and presumed dead.

== Episodes ==
Season	Episodes	Originally released	
Season	Episodes	First released	Last released
1	13	December 16, 2015	April 11, 2016
2	13	January 25, 2017	April 19, 2017
3	13	January 10, 2018	April 4, 2018
4	13	January 23, 2019	April 17, 2019
5	13	January 15, 2020	April 1, 2020

== Production ==
Michael London first optioned the books in 2011, intending to develop the show for the Fox Broadcasting Company. X-Men: First Class co-writers Ashley Miller and Zack Stentz wrote the pilot, but did not get the green light. London then redeveloped the pilot with McNamara and Gamble taking over writing duties, and took the script to Syfy, which ordered a pilot. The pilot, directed by Mike Cahill, was filmed in New Orleans in late 2014 and wrapped in December. Syfy picked up the show for a 13-episode first season, to be aired in 2016. McNamara and Gamble became executive producers.

Series production began on August 4, 2015, in Vancouver, and it was announced that Olivia Taylor Dudley had replaced Sosie Bacon as Alice Quinn. It was also announced that Rick Worthy had been cast as Dean Fogg, Anne Dudek as Professor Sunderland, with Esmé Bianco also cast. Syfy aired an advance commercial-free screening of the first episode on December 16, 2015, ahead of its January 25, 2016, premiere, when it was shown along with the second episode.

The show was renewed for a second season in February 2016, and the second season premiered on January 25, 2017. On April 12, 2017, the series was renewed for a third season of 13 episodes, which premiered on January 10, 2018. On February 28, 2018, the series was renewed for a fourth season of 13 episodes, which premiered on January 23, 2019. On January 22, 2019, Syfy renewed the series for a fifth season, which premiered on January 15, 2020. On March 3, 2020, Syfy announced that the fifth season will be the series' final season.

== Reception ==
=== Critical response ===
The first season received positive reviews. On Metacritic, it has a score of 60 out of 100, based on 24 reviews. On Rotten Tomatoes, it has an approval rating of 74% based on 47 reviews, with an average rating of 6.7/10. The site's critics' consensus reads, "The Magicians' impressive special effects and creative storytelling help compensate for a derivative premise and occasionally sluggish pace."

Some critics and fans criticized the show for its brutal depiction of Julia being raped and that, after having survived being raped, she develops extra magical powers and betrays her friends by allying with a murderer who is also a rape survivor. Lisa Weidenfeld of The A.V. Club stated: "the show has now suggested that the two victims of sexual assault are its villains".

The second season received positive reviews. On Metacritic, it has a score of 74 out of 100, based on 5 reviews. On Rotten Tomatoes, it has an approval rating of 91% based on 22 reviews, with an average rating of 8.06/10. The site's consensus reads: "A clearer sense of purpose and extra helpings of cynicism and danger lead The Magicians to a higher level of engagement."

The third season also received positive reviews. On Rotten Tomatoes, it has a 100% approval rating, based on 11 reviews, with an average rating of 8.4/10. The site's critical consensus reads: "Surprising and wildly entertaining, The Magicians' third season has more than enough tricks up its sleeve to keep viewers under its spell."

The fourth season received positive reviews. On Metacritic, it has a score of 81 out of 100, based on four reviews. On Rotten Tomatoes, it has a 93% approval rating, based on 23 reviews, with an average rating of 9.04/10. The site's consensus reads: "The Magicians conjures a mind-bending fourth season that reinvigorates the ensemble with heady twists and spellbinding turns – all leavened by the series' signature glib humor." While the season started with a 100% score, reception became more mixed in the second half. The finale was not well received by some fans, who mainly criticized the romanticization of suicidal ideation that was displayed but also the treatment of marginalized groups.

The fifth season also received positive reviews. On Rotten Tomatoes, it has a 100% approval rating, based on 10 reviews, with an average rating of 7.87/10. The site's consensus reads: "Following an uncertain finale, The Magicians recuperates with a fifth season that pushes forward without losing where it came from."

=== Ratings ===
Viewership and ratings per season of The Magicians
Season	Timeslot (ET)	Episodes	First aired		Last aired		TV season	Avg. viewers (millions)	18–49 rank	Avg. 18–49 rating
Season	Timeslot (ET)	Episodes	Date	Viewers (millions)	Date	Viewers (millions)	TV season	Avg. viewers (millions)	18–49 rank	Avg. 18–49 rating
1	Monday 9:00 pm	13	December 16, 2015	0.92	April 11, 2016	0.68	2015–16	0.78	TBD	0.29
2	Wednesday 9:00 pm	13	January 25, 2017	1.29	April 19, 2017	0.67	2016–17	0.79	TBD	0.31
3	Wednesday 9:00 pm	13	January 10, 2018	0.78	April 4, 2018	0.66	2017–18	0.71	TBD	0.27
4	Wednesday 9:00 pm	13	January 23, 2019	0.61	April 17, 2019	0.50	2018–19	0.54	TBD	0.19
5	Wednesday 10:00 pm	13	January 15, 2020	0.43	April 1, 2020	0.43	2019–20	0.35	TBD	0.11

=== Awards and nominations ===
Year	Awards	Category	Nominee(s)	Result	Ref.
2016	Saturn Awards	Best Fantasy Television Series	The Magicians	Nominated	
2017	Saturn Awards	Best Fantasy Television Series	The Magicians	Nominated	
2018	Saturn Awards	Best Fantasy Television Series	The Magicians	Nominated	
2018	UBCP/ACTRA Awards	Best Actress	Keegan Connor Tracy	Nominated	
2019	Saturn Awards	Best Fantasy Television Series	The Magicians	Nominated	
2021	Saturn Awards	Best Fantasy Television Series	The Magicians	Nominated	

== Home media release ==
The first season of The Magicians was released on DVD and Blu-Ray on July 19, 2016, in Region 1. The second season followed on July 11, 2017, followed by the third season on July 10, 2018, the fourth season on July 9, 2019, and the fifth season, as well as a complete series box set, on July 14, 2020. Each release included all thirteen episodes, as well as special features.
